= Philosopher's Stone (disambiguation) =

Philosopher's stone is a term for the legendary goal of Western alchemists.

Philosopher's Stone also may refer to:

== Art, entertainment, and media ==
=== Comics ===
- Philosopher's Stone (Fullmetal Alchemist), a plot element in the manga series Fullmetal Alchemist
  - "The Philosopher's Stone" (Fullmetal Alchemist episode)
- "The Fabulous Philosopher's Stone" (1954), a Donald Duck story

=== Fictional entities ===
- Philosopher's Stone, a magical object in the Harry Potter universe

=== Films ===
- Harry Potter and the Philosopher's Stone (film), the 2001 film directed by Chris Columbus, based on the novel of the same name
- Parash Pathar (1958) or The Philosopher's Stone, an Indian Bengali-language film by Satyajit Ray
- Parasmani (transl. Philosopher's Stone), a 1963 Indian film

=== Games ===
- The Quest of the Philosopher's Stone (1986), a fantasy board game published by Questone Marketing, Inc.
- Harry Potter and the Philosopher's Stone (video game), 2001 video game based on the film of the same name.

=== Literature ===
- Den vises sten, a fourteenth-century Swedish poem on the Philosopher's Stone.
- The Philosophers' Stone, a chapter title in Alchemia (1606) by Andreas Libavius
- The Philosopher's Stone (novel) (1969), a science fiction novel by Colin Wilson
- Harry Potter and the Philosopher's Stone (1997), the first novel in the Harry Potter series by J. K. Rowling
- Indiana Jones and the Philosopher's Stone (1995), a novel by Max McCoy
- The Philosopher's Stone: A Quest for the Secrets of Alchemy, a book by Peter Marshall (author, born 1946)

=== Music ===
- Der Stein der Weisen, opera by Wolfgang Amadeus Mozart and others
- The Philosopher's Stone (album), a 1998 album by Van Morrison
- "Philosopher's Stone", a Van Morrison song from Back on Top (1999)
- Harry Potter and the Philosopher's Stone (soundtrack), the soundtrack to the 2001 film, composed by John Williams
- Parash Pathar (band) (lit. 'Philosopher's Stone'), an Indian band

== Other uses ==
- Philosopher's stones, sclerotia of psilocybin mushrooms, including Psilocybe tampanensis and Psilocybe mexicana
