= Figure It Out (disambiguation) =

Figure It Out is an American children's game show that aired on Nickelodeon.

Figure It Out may also refer to:

- Figure It Out (board game), a board game based on the TV show
- "Figure It Out" (Lil' Chris song)
- "Figure It Out" (Serj Tankian song)
- "Figure It Out" (Royal Blood song)
- "Figure It Out" (French Montana song)
- "Figure It Out", a song by VersaEmerge from Fixed at Zero
- "Figure It Out", a song by Chaos Chaos from Chaos Chaos
- "Figure It Out", a song by Maroon 5 from It Won't Be Soon Before Long
- "Figure It Out", a song by Sasami from Blood on the Silver Screen
- Figure It Out, an EP, or the title song, by Jai Waetford
