= Poleconomy =

Board game

- Publishers: Tanner Couch; World Games
- Players: 2–6
- Setup time: 5–10 minutes
- Playing time: About 3 hours
- Chance: Medium (dice rolling, card drawing, luck)
- Age range: 8–adult
- Skills: Simple mathematics such as counting, finding percentages and multiplication, economics, governmental procedure, social skills, negotiation

Poleconomy is a board game invented by New Zealander Bruce E. Hatherley and first published in 1980. Players compete to acquire properties and investments by controlling economic and political activity. It mirrors real-world businesses and players compete to control government decisions and taxation which affect their businesses. The playing time is set by agreement from all players, e.g. 2 hours, and the winner is determined by the monetary sum of all player cash, companies, insurance or other assets. The game can also end when there are no more companies, advertisements in the bank or bonds in the treasury. Another objective of the game is "to teach players some of the fundamentals of economics, and the ways in which the economy and the government interact." Different editions were published for several different countries. The name Poleconomy is a portmanteau of "politics" and "economy".

== History ==
Poleconomy was invented by Bruce Hatherley, a New Zealander from Christchurch who was living in Sydney at the time. He first filed a US patent claim for it in January 1981. It was published in 1980, first in an Australian edition, then a New Zealand edition. The New Zealand edition was produced by Tanner Couch and Robyn Larsen sold the squares on the board as advertising space to the actual companies represented. The New Zealand Stock Exchange was involved with the launch in Auckland. It was also published by World Games.

Hatherley contacted Canadian think tank the Fraser Institute to help introduce the game to Canada in 1983. Michael Walker, an employee of the Institute, sold the first squares as advertising and the rest were sold by stockbrokers, who had little other work because of a recession at the time. More than a million dollars was raised by the Institute and Poleconomy was credited with helping the Institute survive the recession.

It was later sold in South Africa and the United Kingdom in other localised versions. More than 1.5 million copies of Poleconomy have been sold internationally, incorporating the participation of 260 major corporate sponsors who leased advertising space in the separate national versions. US patent 4,522,407 was granted for the game in 1985.

== The game ==
Players compete to acquire properties and investments through stylized economic and political activity. This involves the purchase of real-world companies and advertising using artificial money. The players take turns moving around the board via the roll of the dice, landing on the gameboard squares and carrying out instruction according to the square's contents or player decision.

The game is unusual in its mirroring of real-world businesses for which it has licenses to use their trademarks. It also illustrates how political events such as government decisions and taxation affect the economy. The players take turns at being the prime minister or president through elections. Once in power they have the ability to dictate the levels of inflation and so increasing or decreasing rents for property owners. If a player cannot cover their rent, the debt is written off and they can continue, receiving a government salary; no-one becomes bankrupt. According to the rules the game ends when the central bank runs out of money.

Enterprise Australia sponsored the game to "improve understanding of the free enterprise system" among schoolchildren, and sold over 100,000 copies. The introduction to the rules of the New Zealand version quotes Enterprise New Zealand, "The game reflects the way industry, finance and government interact when private enterprise operates within a system of parliamentary democracy."

== Companies featured in the game ==
Australian Edition (1st)		New Zealand Edition		Canadian Edition	
Company	Advertising	Company	Advertising	Company	Advertising
Boral	The Australian	DRG	Permaglide	Crane	Pentax
Bradmill	Australian Associated Stock Exchanges	Mitsubishi Forklifts	Sellotape	I P Sharp Associates	Global Television Network
CIG	Australia Post	Armourguard	Pakatoa Island	Bombardier	Central Trust
Clyde Industries	Breville	Anchor	Nylex	Molson	Iona
CRA	B&D Roll-A-Doors	Mount Cook Line	Decrabond	William Mercer Limited	Avco Financial Services
Eric White Associates	Dulux	Van Camp	Amalgamated Marketing	Allied Van Lines	Edmonton Oilers
George Pattersons	EAC - Estate Agents Cooperative	Tux	Air New Zealand	Penmans Canada	Wynn's
HC Sleigh	Holden	New Zealand Forest Products	Team McMillan Ford	Maple Leaf Mills	Loblaws
IBM	Hoyts	Europa	Stewart Wrightson	Kaufman Footwear	Lepage
ICI	Kodak	Hallmark	Pizza Hut	Dynamic Funds	Teleglobe Canada
John Sands	Lady Scott	Hertz	Kiwi Bacon	Fraser Institute	Cheerios
Kinnears	Newsweek	IBM	Dulux	Midland Bank Canada	Caldwell Luxury Towels
Monier	OPSM	ICI	Marac	Kraft	Golden
Nylex	Pal	NZIG	Mitre 10	Delta Hotels	Actualite Newsmagazine
Olympic	Patra Fruit Juices	Watties	Heylen Research Centre	Neilson	Texmode Fashion Sheets
Pioneer	Reed Stenhouse	Whitcoulls	Choysa	Dow Chemical Canada	Scott
STC	Seppelt - Great Western	Reidrubber	Amco		Victor
TNT	Singapore Airlines	Donaghys	Hylin Laundry Services		CP Air
Union Carbide	Skipper a Clipper	Lucas Service	Ralta		Ikea
Wormald	Southern Pacific Hotel Corporation	Winstone	Atlantic and Pacific travel		
FAS	Southern Pacific Corporation	Centra	Atlantic and Pacific Safety		Esso
	Streets		Network consultants		David Ingram's CENTRA
	Trans Australia Airlines		GSI		
	Telecom Australia Go Telex		Northern United Building Society		
	Telecom Australia Phone STD Off-Peak		NZSE		
	Vulcan		Heylen Research Centre		
			New Zealand Times		

== Reception ==
Paul Cockburn reviewed Poleconomy for Imagine magazine, and stated that "Indeed, in a game where players are being cautious and keeping the amount of cash in front of them at a minimum (which limits the government's ability to tax) it's very hard not to bankrupt the country."

In the March 1989 edition of Games International (Issue #3), John Harrington pointed out that "what we have here is a direct descendant of Monopoly." He found the voting system in the basic game, which was simply based on rolls of dice, "disappointing", and recommended that players move to the advanced game as quickly as possible. Harrington concluded by giving the game an average rating of 3 out of 5, saying, "I can give the advanced version of Poleconomy a recommendation, if only on the grounds that trying to stop the country going down the toilet is an illuminating experience."
