= Clue Jr.: Case of the Missing Pet =

Board game

- Publishers: Parker Brothers
- Players: 1 to 6
- Setup time: 5 minutes
- Playing time: 20 minutes
- Chance: Low
- Age range: 6 and up
- Skills: Deduction; Dice Rolling

Clue Jr.: The Case of the Missing Pet is a board game that was released in the US in 1989 by Parker Brothers. It is a variant of Clue aimed at younger players.

== Overview ==
This is the first Clue Jr Game in the United States. The object of the game is similar to the original; however, instead of a murderer, location, and weapon, players must figure out what pet was stolen, who took it, and where it is hidden. As such, the game is set in a downtown urban or suburban area rather than in a mansion.

The game had 24 different cases of pet kidnapping with the help of the "mystery wheel" playing board that was moved before the start of each new case and after the last case had been solved. The game also came with a red magnifying glass that was needed to read the clues on the wheel. The board has seven "trap doors" that hold one aspect of the pet, location, or kidnapper. To figure out which suspect took the pet, players need to know eye color, hair color, and whether they smiled or not. To figure out which pet was stolen, players need to get the pet store. And to figure out where the pet was hidden, players need to know the sign color of the store and whether the store had wood or rug flooring.

== Contents ==
- Instructions
- Game board with seven "trap doors" and mystery wheel board attached
- Six game pieces
- Red magnifying glass
- 7 plastic trap door covers
- Detective notesheet pads
- One six-side dice

== Suspects ==
- Polly Peacock – brown eyes, dark hair, and does not smile
- Samantha Scarlet – brown eyes, dark hair, and smiles
- Wendy White – blue eyes, light hair, and does not smile
- Mortimer Mustard – brown eyes, light hair, and smiles
- Georgie Green – blue eyes, light hair, and smiles
- Peter Plum – blue eyes, dark hair, and does not smile

== Pets ==
- Dog
- Cat
- Monkey
- Turtle
- Bird
- Goldfish

== Stores ==
- Sign store – wood flooring, yellow sign
- Wig store – rug flooring, green sign
- Rug store – wood flooring, red sign
- Bank – wood flooring, green sign
- Dentist – rug flooring, yellow sign
- Glasses – rug flooring, red sign

The Pet Shop was not a hiding location, but told a player what pet was stolen. The Police station was also not a hiding location; this is the location on the board a player must be to make an accusation; the solution is hidden under the "trap door" in the Police Station.

== Gameplay ==
Clue Jr.: The Case of the Missing Pet is a deduction game for two to six players, designed for ages six to ten. Each game revolves around determining which character is responsible for a missing pet, which pet is missing, and where the pet is hidden. Possible characters include Scarlet, Peter Plum, George Green, Wendy White, Mortimer Mustard, and Polly Peacock. The missing pets may be a puppy, kitten, monkey, turtle, or canary, and the hiding places include various locations such as a bank, dentist's office, or retail stores.

The game includes 24 different mysteries. At the start of each round, a revolving Mystery Wheel beneath the game board is turned to set the clues and solution for that mystery. As players move through the game, they gather information that allows them to eliminate possibilities and narrow down the correct combination of character, pet, and location.

When a player believes the mystery has been solved, the player announces the solution and checks it against the information concealed under the trap door at the Police Station on the game board. If the solution matches the hidden answer, the player wins the round. If the solution is incorrect, the player is eliminated from further play in that round.

At the beginning of play, three cards—one Suspect, one Pet, and one Location card—are chosen at random by the mystery wheel and put into the "trap door" under the Police Station. These cards represent the true facts of the case.

Players move around the board by rolling the die and following whatever was written on the space that they landed on. Like the rooms in the original, players move in and out of stores to figure out the three elements of the suspect, the two elements of the hiding place of the pet, and what pet was stolen. When all the elements were deduced, the player had to move to the Police Station to make an accusation, check the solution, and win or lose the game if right or wrong.

== Reception ==
The Palm Beach Post commented: "If the names Scarlet, Green, Plum, White, Peacock and Mustard sound familiar, they should. They are the surnames of the suspects in the Clue board game, which has been delighting murder mystery fans for over 40 years. They are also the suspects in Parker Brothers' new children's version of the whodunit favorite But thievery, not murder, is the crime in question in the Clue Jr. The Case of the Missing Pet game. Who stole the pet—Samantha Scarlet, Peter Plum, George Green, Wendy White, Mortimer Mustard or Polly Peacock? Which pet is missing—the puppy, the kitten, the monkey, the turtle or the canary? And where is it hidden—in the bank, the dentist's office, the sign store, the wig store, the rug store or the glasses store? Designed for two to six players ages 6 to 10, Clue Jr. offers sub-team sleuths 24 different mysteries to solve. Clues and solutions are stored under the game board on a revolving Mystery Wheel that Is turned to begin each new round of play. When a player announces that he has solved the crime, he checks his solution against the information hidden under the trap door in the Police Station. If his powers of deduction are as keen as Inspector Poirot's, he wins the round. However, if they are more like Inspector Clouseau's, he must drop out.

Richard Harrington of The Washington Post commented that "thievery is afoot, not murder [...] Put either 'Jr.' or 'For Kids' after every popular game and you've got a whole new market."

Terri Patkin in the 2020 book Who's in the Game? Identity and Intersectionality in Classic Board Games said that "Like most junior editions, Clue Jr. The Case of the Missing Pet (1989) eliminates any potentially disturbing adult content; in this case, the murder is replaced with the mystery of a pet that has been hidden in a store by one of the six suspects. The six colorful suspects from the adult game are transformed into children, and each is given an alliterative first name: Peter Plum, Wendy White, Georgie Green, Mortimer Mustard, Samantha Scarlet, and Polly Peacock. No personality characteristics are assigned to them, and all are depicted as chubby-cheeked moppets. Allusions to the adult game can be gleaned by those in the know when looking at the depiction of the characters in the box art; they are positioned and dressed analogously to their adult counterparts. Peacock clutches an umbrella, Scarlet's lips are pursed in an alluring smile, young Mustard inexplicably has a monocle, Green's pose resembles his typical manspreading one, White in her maid's uniform cowers at the rear of the group, and Plum smokes a bubble pipe. The game mechanic also changes to make game play easier, with fewer choices of rooms and pets than in the adult game."
