= Battle Dome (toy) =

1994 pinball machine

- Other names: Marble Dome; Flipper Fun; Quattro-Flipper
- Type: Board game; pinball
- Company: Tsukuda Original (Japan); Pal Box (Japan); Megahouse (Japan); Anjar (United States); Golden (United States); Parker Brothers (United States)
- Country: United States; Japan
- Availability: October 1994 (American Battle Dome; Japan)–29 July 2010 (Action Battle Dome; Japan)

The Battle Dome (バトルドーム, Batoru Dōmu) was a pinball board game from the American company Anjar. It was released from Tsukuda Original in Japan, in which the company was taken over by Pal Box and Megahouse. On 29 July 2010, Megahouse renewed the toy as Action Battle Dome.

== Overview ==
The game consists as a pinball game from two to four players.

- The game starts when the player puts the balls in the upper part, the balls are dropped at regular intervals by the mainspring.
- The aim is to not have the balls in the player's goal. The game ends when all the balls entered all goals.
  - In Action Battle Dome, the balls stay in the mechanism called the stocker, in which the ball is not counted.
- The yellow balls are worth one point and the black (blue when the body color is blue) balls worth five, and the player with the lowest score wins.
  - In Action Battle Dome, yellow balls are worth one point and red balls worth three.

== Products ==
- American Battle Dome (アメリカンバトルドーム, Amerikan Batoru Dōmu)
  - Sold in October 1994 by Tsukuda Original.
  - The main body colour is black and the balls are yellow and black. The spinners (S-shape mechanisms attached to the dome) are coloured yellow-green.
  - This version was re-released in 2024 for the 30th anniversary by Bandai Namco using the same visual design.
- American Battle Dome (video game)
  - Released by Tsukuda Original on 8 December 1995.
  - The platform is the Super Nintendo Entertainment System. Played up to four players.
- American Battle Dome (arcade game)
  - Released by Sun Wise in 1995.
- Super American Battle Dome (スーパーアメリカンバトルドーム, Sūpā Amerikan Batoru Dōmu)
  - Released by Tsukuda Original.
  - The flippers are electronically driven. It is compatible with the American Battle Dome, and can possibly be mixed.
  - The main body colour is black, and the balls are yellow and black. The spinners are coloured pink. The colouring of the details are also different from the American Battle Dome.
- New American Battle Dome (NEWアメリカンバトルドーム, Nyū Amerikan Batoru Dōmu)
  - It was sold by Tsukuda Original on 25 July 1998. The game was continued to be sold when the company was taken over by Pal Box and Megahouse.
  - The body colour is blue, and the balls are yellow and blue. The colours of the spinners are yellow. The seal design of "American Battle Dome" was changed.
- American Battle Dome (Toys "R" Us limited black)
  - The colours are different from the aforementioned New American Battle Dome. The balls are luminescent.
- Doraemon Battle Dome (ドラえもんバトルドーム, Doraemon Batoru Dōmu)
  - Released from Tsukuda Original on 20 November 1999.
  - Unlike other Battle Domes, it is motorized (using two AA size batteries).
- Action Battle Dome (アクションバトルドーム, Akushon Batoru Dōmu)
  - Released by Megahouse on 29 July 2010.
  - The body colour is red and the balls are yellow and red. The spinners are coloured light blue.
  - It uses a different ball discharge mechanism from the American Battle Dome (not in mainsprings).

In overseas,

- Battle Dome
- Marble Dome (Golden)
- Flipper Fun (Parker Brothers)
- Quattro-Flipper (Parker Brothers)

Similar items are licensed and sold under the name Anjar.
