= Rap Rat =

Video board game

- Other names: The Video Board Game Rap Rat (NTSC version); Rap Rat Le jeu de société vidéo (French release)
- Directors: A Couple 'A Cowboys
- Actors: Paul Johnstone; Doug Williams
- Publishers: J. W. Spear & Sons; Habourdin International
- Publication: 1992
- Genres: Video board game
- Players: 2–6 (NTSC version); 2–4 (Other versions)
- Playing time: 40 minutes (NTSC version)
- Chance: High
- Age range: 5+ (NTSC version)
- Skills: Dice rolling

Rap Rat, also known as The Video Board Game Rap Rat, is a video board game that combines elements from traditional board games with the usage of a VHS tape to play it. It was originally released in 1992 by A Couple 'A Cowboys and J. W. Spear & Sons, with versions of the game in other languages such as French being released later on by Habourdin International.

In one version of the game, the players are represented by four differently colored cheese playing pieces and have to collect all eight pieces of their cheese puzzle with the same coloration as their playing piece, which they then have to insert in a TV-shaped frame. If one player manages to collect all of their puzzle pieces before anyone else, they can insert a special puzzle piece of the titular character, Rap Rat, into a hole in the lower middle of the puzzle frame, then shout said character's name and press the "Stop" button on their VCR. If they do so, then they're the winner of the round.

== Gameplay ==
The amount of players needed varies. If its the NTSC version, then the max amount is six, while the other versions have four players as the total amount. The goal of the players is to collect all eight pieces of their respective puzzle and, if its not the NTSC variant, place them inside of their TV puzzle frame, then put in their Rap Rat puzzle piece before shouting his name and pausing the VCR, thus beating one of three rounds. Additionally, if the version of the game is the NTSC version, then all players will have to collect two additional puzzle pieces to complete them. The cheese backdrop on the TV screen acts as the game's timer, as Rap Rat will slowly eat it as time passes along with occasionally interrupting gameplay to punish or taunt the players, with the one who was holding the dice at the time of his return usually being the one who gets punished. If the affected player listens to Rap Rat's orders, there's a possibility that he'll give them a piece of their puzzle, but he may also take one of them, which must be returned to the center of the board afterwards. If Rap Rat is able to eat all of the cheese on the TV screen before the players finish their puzzle, he'll declare himself the winner.

== Video ==
All versions of the game come with a VHS tape, which is used to play the game. One version is more than fifty minutes long, while the NTSC tape is forty minutes. One version contains instructions on how to set the game up and how to play, with the game itself being featured as well, consisting of three rounds. As Rap Rat eats the cheese backdrop after giving separate instructions on how to play the game, he'll occasionally pop up through a circular hole in the middle of the backdrop, with a popping noise indicating his return. As soon as Rap Rat returns, everyone must stop playing and listen to him. Whoever was holding the dice when Rap Rat appeared can receive varying punishments. For example, one of Rap Rat's punishments to the affected player includes running on the spot until they hear the sound of a bell ringing. Rap Rat can also ask everyone playing to smile and say "Cheese", which all players need to do. If a player doesn't, then they'll miss a turn to roll the die.

== See also ==
- List of board games
- Nightmare (Atmosfear series)
- Atmosfear (series)
