= Shengguan Tu =

Table of Bureaucratic Promotion
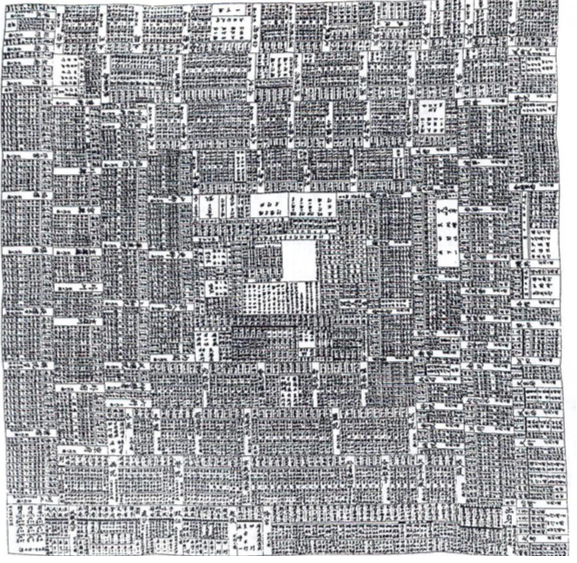
- Qing dynasty game board for sheng guan tu
- Designers: Li He; Liu Gongfu
- Publication: c. 836
- Players: 2 onwards
- Chance: High (dice rolling)
- Skills: Resource management; Strategy

Shengguan Tu (simplified Chinese: 升官图; traditional Chinese: 陞官圖; pinyin: shēngguān tú), translated variously as Promoting Officials and Table of Bureaucratic Promotion, is an ancient Chinese board game that originated in the Tang dynasty, with the earliest historical record of a variant of it dating back to 836. The game has players take on the roles of mandarins; the objective of the game is to attain the highest possible bureaucratic position, whilst accumulating more prestige and monetary funds than other players. Contemporary commentators have compared it to snakes and ladders for its mechanics and Monopoly for its reflection of the values of the inventors' society. Historically a gambling game doubling as an educational tool for acquainting Chinese males with the bureaucratic hierarchy, it still enjoys relative popularity nowadays.

== History ==
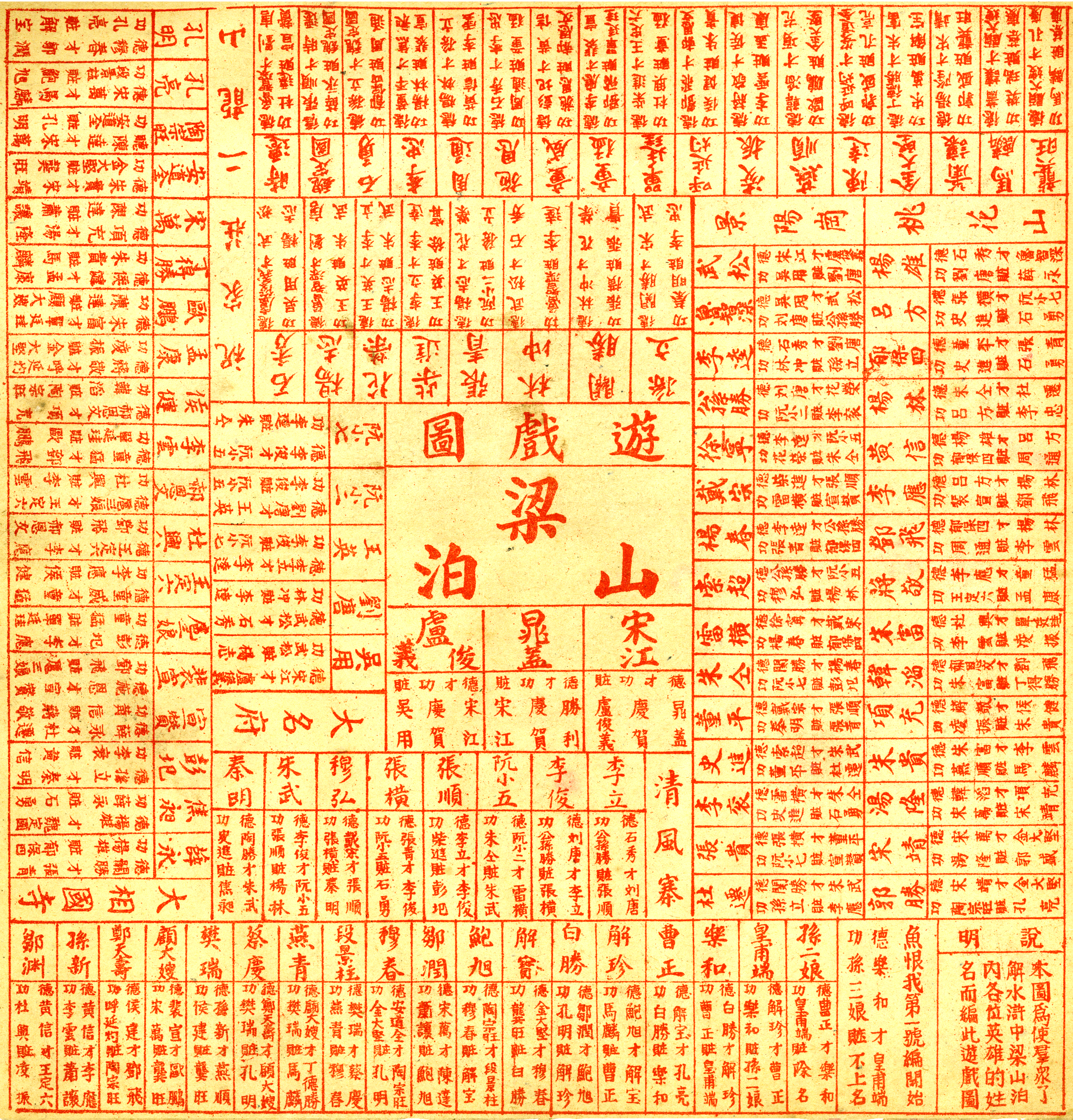
A Water Margin edition of Shengguan Tu.

=== Early history ===
The keju imperial examination system, which Shengguan Tu is based on, was first explicitly mandated upon Chinese students during the Sui dynasty. According to the Ministry of Education of the Republic of China (Taiwan), Shengguan Tu was first introduced during the Tang dynasty which immediately succeeded the Sui dynasty. In his Preface to Selecting a Bureau by Throwing Dice (838), Tang scholar Fang Qianli writes of his playing Caixuan Ge (Selecting a Bureau), "an ancestor to Shengguan Tu", while stranded on a boat with a few friends in 836. Beyond that, however, the "few" historical sources "dealing with (the game) are confused and tend to feed off each other". Twelfth-century writer Xu Du references the game in a short passage in Quesao Bian; subsequent historical sources, including the eighteenth-century Gaiyu Congkao by Zhao Yi, rely heavily on the information provided by Xu. However, Xu's account was based on others' verbal accounts, and the quotations of his passage are believed to have been corrupted, according to Carole Morgan in the Journal of the American Oriental Society. A more recent attempt by Cai Ce in 1968 to retrace the early history of Shengguan Tu is similarly "so flawed as to be practically useless".

Tang government official Li He was the undisputed inventor of Caixuan Ge, the early incarnation of Shengguan Tu that Fang Qianli played; Li's game was improved upon and modified by subsequent officials, including Liu Gongfu, who is credited with creating the "version that has been transmitted to the world".

=== Overseas export ===
==== Korea ====
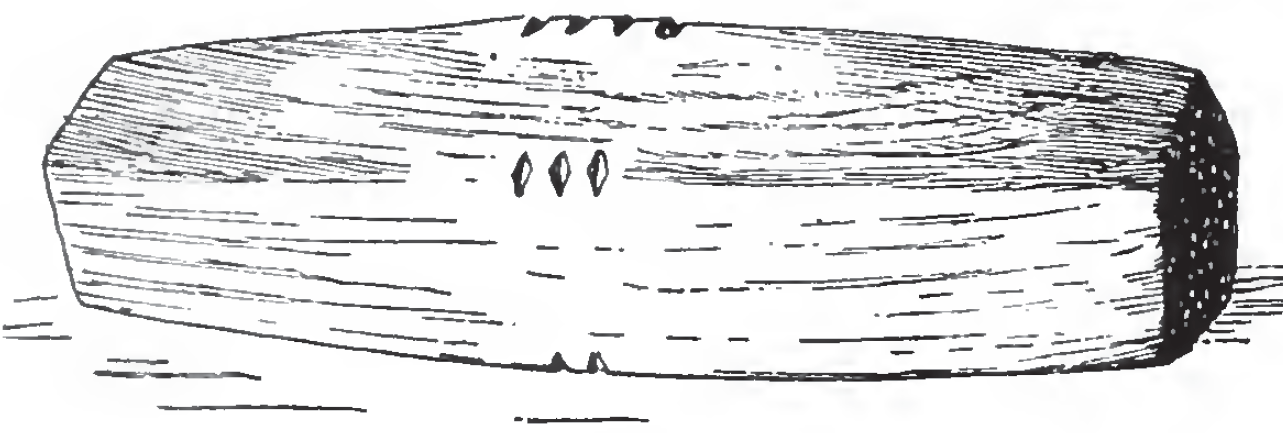
Yunmok, a five faced dice used for the korean version of the game, depicted in the book "Chess and Playing-Cards" by Stewart Culin

A version of Shengguan Tu exists in Korea, known as Seungyeongdo (승경도) or Seungyeongdo-nori (승경도 놀이), modelled after the bureaucracy of the Joseon dynasty and is said to be invented by a guy called Ha ryun. It uses a different dice known as yunmok (윤목; 輪木). The noble yangban class teach their children with this game, so they could know better about these official positions. Admiral Yi Sun-sin wrote in his diary that he enjoyed playing this game with his subordinates during his free time.

==== The west ====
The Western world became aware of Shengguan Tu in as early as the seventeenth century, when Robert Hyde published the Latin book on "oriental games" titled De Ludis Orientalibilis, a portion of which is dedicated to describing the game. In the nineteenth century, Chinese emigrants to the United States, particularly California and New York, who worked as clerks and "barely literate" blue-collar workers enjoyed playing Shengguan Tu as a pastime. The game boards they would use were typically printed in Guangzhou.

=== Other versions ===
Shengguan Tu inspired the creation of similar games. The Song dynasty poet Wang Gui wrote a poem on a gambling game called Xuanxian Tu, or Selecting an Immortal, whose gameplay is identical to that of Shengguan Tu save players are either immortals or commoners, instead of mandarins. In Baiguan Duo (Instructions for all Officials), invented during the Ming dynasty, dice are substituted with "bright stones". Zhonning Shengguan Tu (Promoting Loyal and [Not] Sycophantic Officials) focused on a bureaucrat's "personal character and competence", and access to which was limited to the social circles of two Ming officials. An apocryphal anecdote by Zhao Yi has it that the ailing Emperor Xingzong of Liao began promoting or demoting officials by the roll of a die instead of using his own judgement.

=== Twenty-first century ===
Nowadays the game is still frequently played in parts of mainland China, as well as Hong Kong and Taiwan. Likewise, Shengguan Tu game boards are still in production. As of 2006, some Shengguan Tu boards can cost as much as CN¥10,000. In December 2008, as part of its winter festivities, the North District Tourist Service Centre (北區遊客服務中心) in Changhua, Taiwan installed a lifesize Shengguan Tu board. In January 2016, as part of its first anniversary celebrations, the Taiwanese Fongyi Academy in Fengshan District, Kaohsiung rolled out some hundred modernised copies of Shengguan Tu for public use.

== Gameplay ==
Shengguan Tu is typically played on a sheet of paper with six dice that are to be rolled in a bowl. Boards come in two sizes: large and small, with the former naturally having more "charts" to indicate different bureaus than the latter. The number of charts available ranges from 63 to 117. Each player is represented by a main token, alongside two other mandarin tokens. Each player starts off with 120 cash in tokens and as a student in China's imperial examination system who is able to rise up the ranks with the roll of the dice; ranking promotions or demotions arbitrarily correspond with the value rolled, and is dictated by a rules booklet available for reference during gameplay. Additionally, players who incur demotions have to pay fines. However, the game also includes the element of corruption; favours and titles can be bought, and the rules permit players to receive "donations". Since at least the Qing dynasty, there has been no universal standard of Shengguan Tu rules. Furthermore, the written instructions provided on one version of the board obtained by Carole Morgan often "contradict each other" and have to be "supplemented by orally transmitted rules".

== Reception ==
Scholar Ji Yun, who was active during the Qing dynasty, was allegedly very addicted to Shengguan Tu as a gambling game. Legend has it that his addiction impeded his ability to do his work efficiently, to the point that the Qianlong Emperor summoned him for an explanation. However, Ji Yun was able to convince Qianlong that he had been hard at work studying the bureaucratic system, and Qianlong became more impressed with the scholar. Cai Ce, who authored a pamphlet on the game, derides the utilisation of Shengguan Tu as "vulgar entertainment" in the form of a gambling game, while praising it as a "graphic learning tool which clearly depicts the workings of the Qing bureaucracy". In contrast, Tong Hongju points out that even as a gambling game, the stakes are considerably low, and the element of gambling only enhances the joy of playing Shengguan Tu. Carole Morgan, in an essay titled The Chinese Game of Shengguan tu published in the Journal of the American Oriental Society, remarks that the game is "unusual" in that it "not only reproduces the a complex administrative framework but also includes the malpractices inherent in the system".

== See also ==
- List of board games

== Bibliography ==
- Gimm, Martin (2003). "Shengguan tu (Tafel der Beamtenkarriere), eine makkaronische Volksballade aus der mittleren Qing-Zeit" (PDF). Oriens Extremus. 44: 211–252.
- Morgan, Carole (2004). "The Chinese Game of Shengguan tu". Journal of the American Oriental Society. 124 (3): 517–532. JSTOR 4132278.
- Smith, Richard (2015). The Qing Dynasty and Traditional Chinese Culture. Rowman & Littlefield.
