= Piecepack =

Board game system

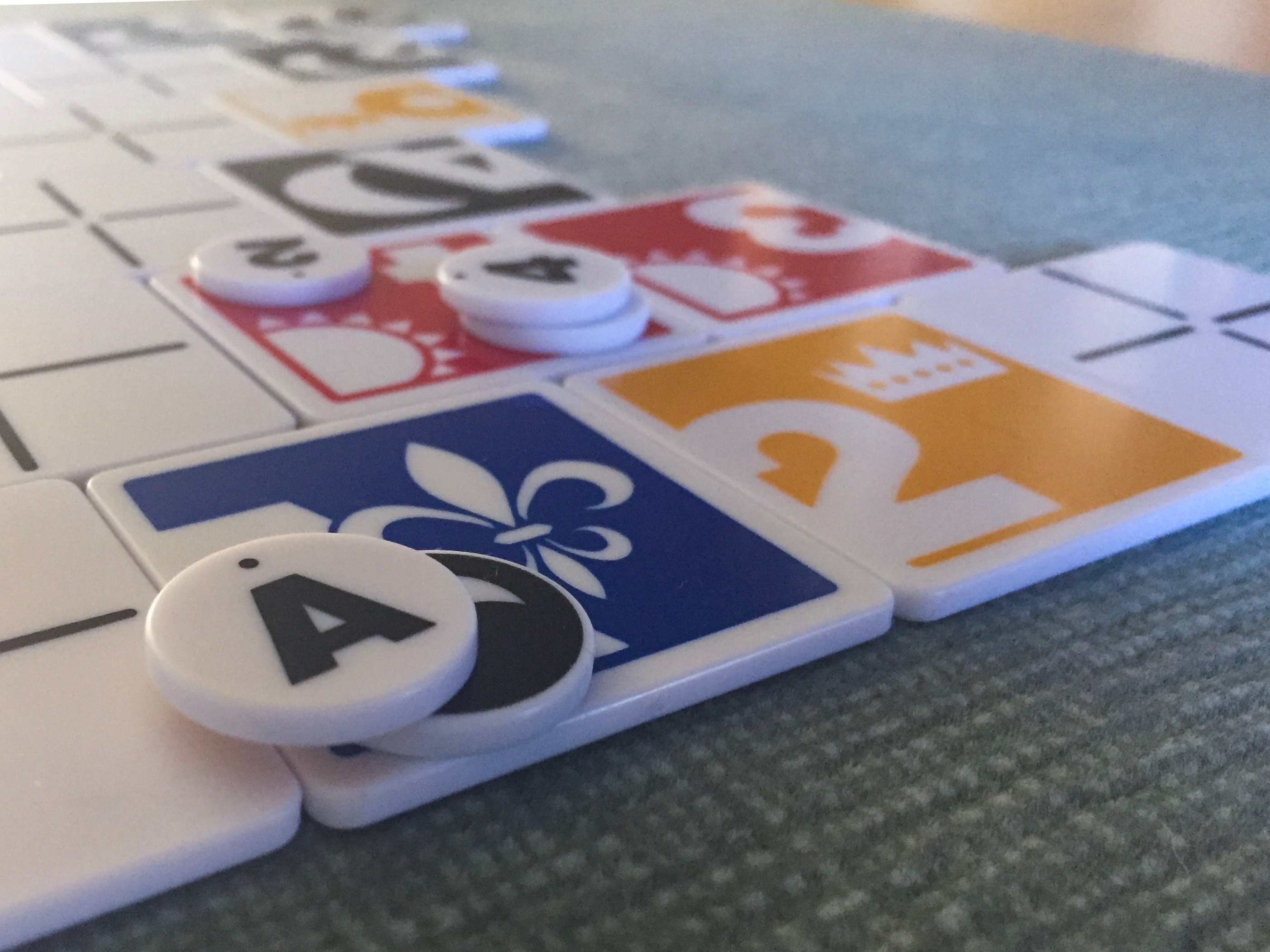
- Some components from The Infinite Board Game
- Designers: James Kyle
- Publication: 2001; 25 years ago
- Genres: Game System
- Website: https://piecepack.net

Piecepack is a public-domain game system that can be used to play a wide variety of board games, much as a standard deck of cards can be used to play thousands of card games ("A game system is a set of components that function together in multiple games"). Piecepack has been used by dozens of different game designers to create over 225 different board games and is available from many different manufacturers. It was created by James Kyle in 2001.

The system consists of 24 tiles, 24 coins, 4 pawns, and 4 dice. The Mystique Deck has been designed to use the same 4 suits (Suns, Moons, Arms, and Crowns), for compatibility with the Piecepack system. The pieces are sometimes used in conjunction with other components, including dominoes or playing cards.

The book The Infinite Board Game: Introducing the Amazing Piecepack System, published by Workman Publishing Company in 2015, details 50 of the games and includes a piecepack set with it, although the set included deviates from the published specification in the location of the suit markers. This deviation renders certain piecepack games (for example, Alien City) unplayable with the Infinite Boardgame piecepack. The piecepack is one of the base game systems included in Tabletop Simulator and is also available as a module for the Vassal Engine.

The system has been used for prototyping other games, including the prototyping of video games.

== Expansions ==
=== HexPack ===
This is also a public domain expansion, which adds hexagonal tiles and triangular coins, using the same 4 suits as Piecepack.

Hexpack was created by Daniel Wilcox and Nathan Morse in 2008. They developed Hexpack as an expansion to extend the possibilities of the original modular system, introducing hexagonal pieces as an alternative to the square ones.

As an expansion, some or all of the Piecepack components can be used in the games, but this expansion has no additional dice or pawns.

=== CardPack ===
CardPack also in the public domain brings the system to cards.

There are 4 suits (arms, suns, moons and crowns) for the cards. And the cards are of empty value or 0, AS, 2, 3, 4, 5, like PiecePack.

There are also additional cards similar to the Joker card in poker where one is the 5 card values and the other the 5 suits.

=== Matchsticks ===
This expansion was created by Dan Burkey in 2018, and is in the public domain. It adds 144 pieces in the form of matchsticks. The reason for this expansion is to provide pieces to create games that involve roads, walls or similar elements.

The 144 pieces are broken down into:

- 4 PiecePack suits (arms, suns, moons and crowns).
- 6 sizes corresponding to the 6 ranks (null or 0, ace or 1, 2, 3, 4, 5).
- 6 copies of each rank/suit pair, so there are 36 pieces per suit.

In the centre of each stick is the number with one of the six values of the PiecePack (null or 0, ace or 1, 2, 2, 3, 4, 5). And each stick has the suit symbol at one end. This helps to give the north–south orientation to the sticks with the stick symbol.

The measurements are:

- null or 0, equivalent to the intersection of grid lines on the tile back.
- ace or 1, half the size of the side of the tile.
- 2, the size of the diagonal of one of the four squares on a tile.
- 3, the size of the diagonal that makes the rectangle of two squares in a row out of the four squares on a tile.
- 4, the size of the complete side of the tile.
- 5, the size of the full diagonal from corner to corner of the tile.

=== AcesPack ===
Expansion created by Miguel de Dios Matías in 2025 of public domain that adds aces.

The reason for this expansion is to contribute two things:

- add the Aces suit using the Ace Piecepack symbol
- add another suit also of Aces but where its components instead of being the 6 numerical values (of void, ace, 2 - 5) are the Piecepack suits (void, ace, arms, crowns, moons, suns).

Increasing the possibilities for games that need either 5 suits or have random suits (for example using the dice with the faces with Piecepack suits).

Furthermore, this expansion applies this logic to the other Piecepack expansions, such as HexPack, CardPack, Matchsticks by adding their corresponding Aces components. Adding the two Aces suits, the numeric and the suit suit suit. The exception is CardPack which does not add the composite card suit with the other Piecepack symbols because it already exists previously in this expansion as Aces of each suit.
