= Ta Yü (game) =

Board game

Ta Yü is an abstract strategy game based on the legendary Yu the Great.

The game itself is a tile-based tabletop game designed by Nicolas Neuwahl in 1999. In this game for 2–4 players, players take turns to play 3×1 tiles with three connections on each tile, each trying to make channels that run to his or her own side of the board. In a two-player game, one player plays north and south and the other plays east and west. In a four-player game, the north and south players are partners as are the east and west players. In the three-player game, one player plays the flood and attempts to keep other players from making connections to the edge of the board.

The game ends when there is no legal placement for a tile. The players or teams score points equal to the product of the number of connections to each side controlled. Thus if north–south has 5 connections to the north edge and 4 connections to the south edge, the score is 20 points.

With three players, players bid to play the flood with the lowest bidding player winning. If neither east–west nor north–south reach the number of connections to the edge of the board as the bid, then the flood wins.

== Awards ==
- Spiel des Jahres Nominee 1999
