= Amco =

American car produced from 1917 to 1922

The Amco was an American automobile manufactured primarily for the export market, designed by D.M. Eller and built by American Motors, Inc. of New York City from 1917 to 1922.

Between 1919 and 1920 the company produced cars that had left- or right-hand steering optional. The cars were marketed in a single color: beige. Each carried a radiator specially designed for tropical climates. Amcos were powered by Golden, Belknap & Swartz (GB&S) 35 hp inline-four engine, and they had a wheelbase of 114 inches (2,896 mm).
