= Probe (parlor game) =

Parlor game or board game introduced in the 1960s

4 different boxes for the same game
- #201, #112, #200, #202
- Manufacturers: Parker Brothers
- Publication: 1964 (#112 and #200), 1974 (#201), 1976 (#202)
- Years active: 1964 to 1982
- Players: Best for 3 or 4. Rule variations for 2.
- Setup time: 5 minutes
- Playing time: 30-60 minutes, depending on number of players
- Chance: Low/medium (guessing); High, with optional use of random "activity" cards
- Age range: 8 and up
- Skills: Spelling, vocabulary
- Website: Probe at BoardGameGeek

Probe is a parlor game or board game introduced in the 1960s by Parker Brothers. It is reminiscent of the simple two-person game Hangman, whose object is to guess a word chosen by another player by revealing specific letters. Probe extends the number of players to a maximum of four and introduces additional game elements that increase the levels of both skill and chance. Like Hangman, each player has a secret chosen word. But unlike Hangman, the game ends when the last word, not the first word, is revealed. All players remain in the game until the end. It was created by Ted Leavitt and licensed by him to Parker Brothers.

== Description ==
The original game set includes four plastic display racks and four decks of 96 cards. Each card has either one letter or a blank on it. Each deck has 5 each of A, S, blank; 3 each of B, H, P, W, Y; 2 each of J, Q, V, X, Z; and 4 each of all the other letters. Each display rack can hold up to twelve cards, with a point value assigned to each card position: 5-10-15-15-10-5-5-10-15-15-10-5. The cards are used to spell out each player's secret word face-down on one of the racks. For words less than 12 letters, blank cards may be used at one or both ends of the word to disguise its true length. Game version #202, introduced in 1976, replaces the letter cards with strips of paper on which the letters are written, and doors snap into place to cover them.

In the most basic form of the game, the turn-holding player asks any other player if he has a particular letter of the alphabet hidden on his display rack. If the answer is "no", play simply passes to the next player in sequence. Otherwise, the player turns up any one card showing that letter, and play continues for the turn-holder, who may address another question to the same player or switch to a different player. His turn ends when he finally gets a "no" answer. If any cards were turned up, the point values underneath them are added to turn-holder's score. If any were the last card of a word, a 50-point bonus is added. If the turn ended by asking for a blank (and hearing "no"), a 50-point penalty is assessed.

An optional way to start each turn is for the turn-holder to first draw from a deck of "activity" cards, which adds an element of luck, such as "Take an additional turn" or "Triple the value of your first guess". Another option is to designate one player to keep track of the "no" answers that occur during play, so that turns aren't wasted on redundant inquiries, and there are no disputes at the end.

At any time during the game, a player can interrupt the game and ask another player (who has at least five unexposed cards) if his word is a specific word. If successful, the inquiring player earns the point value of all unexposed cards, plus 100 bonus points. If incorrect, the inquiring player loses 50 points.

When only one player has unexposed cards, the game continues for two rounds, excluding the player with unexposed cards. If that fails to reveal the word, the values of the remaining cards and the 50-point bonus go to the excluded player.

If two people play the game and each uses two display racks, then a player can turn up a requested letter in either word.

Words are required to be regular words of the language played by the participants, and not include proper names or trademarks. The rules are similar to Scrabble. The 1972 retail price was approximately US$6.00.

== History ==
Ted Leavitt, a sometime salesman, ship's purser, actor, World War II Marine veteran, and theatrical producer, became frustrated with some of the limitations he saw in Scrabble and devised Probe specifically to get around them. To bring his finished creation to the attention of Parker Brothers, he enlisted the services of his uncle, the notable French conductor Pierre Monteux. A vice president of Parker Brothers was an aficionado of classical music; Leavitt enticed him that summer to Maine, where his uncle was conducting the London Symphony Orchestra, by offering him a chance to meet Monteux. Eighteen years later, in 1981, annual sales were 200,000 units per year, and Leavitt had lived in Spain for 15 years from the royalty income, which was $0.225 per game sold. Some years his annual royalties came to $45,000 ($159,000 in 2025 dollars).

== Reception ==
Games magazine included Probe in their "Top 100 Games of 1980", praising it as "a classic" even though at that time players wrote words on paper "instead of using the handsomely printed deck of cards to form words as in the original Probe (1964)".

Games magazine included Probe in their "Top 100 Games of 1982", noting that "The equipment has been improved since last year."

== Reviews ==
- Games & Puzzles #11
- The Playboy Winner's Guide to Board Games
