= Mr. Trucker =

1987 board game

Mr.Trucker
- Designers: Myrnna Hunter, Larry Hunter
- Publishers: Marketing International
- Publication: 1987
- Genres: Board game
- Players: 2–6
- Setup time: 5 minutes
- Playing time: 60–90 minutes
- Chance: Medium
- Age range: 10+
- Skills: Route planning, resource management, logistics

Mr. Trucker is a board game published in 1987 by Marketing International. Players assume the roles of long-haul truck drivers, aiming to deliver goods across various cities while managing their routes and finances. The game blends elements of logistics, strategy, and chance.

== Contents ==
Mr. Trucker is a game in which the player delivers goods to other cities to receive payment.

== Game Overview ==
In Mr. Trucker, players compete to earn money by transporting cargo between destinations on a stylized highway map. Each delivery earns a profit, and players must choose routes carefully to maximize earnings while avoiding hazards or costly detours. The game is designed for 2 to 6 players and typically takes around 60-90 minutes to complete.

== Reception ==
Alan R. Moon reviewed Mr. Trucker for Games International magazine, and gave it 1 star out of 5, and stated that "I got several promotional items with the game [...] The blind leading the blind. Take it from me, this is a turkey."
