= Chromino =

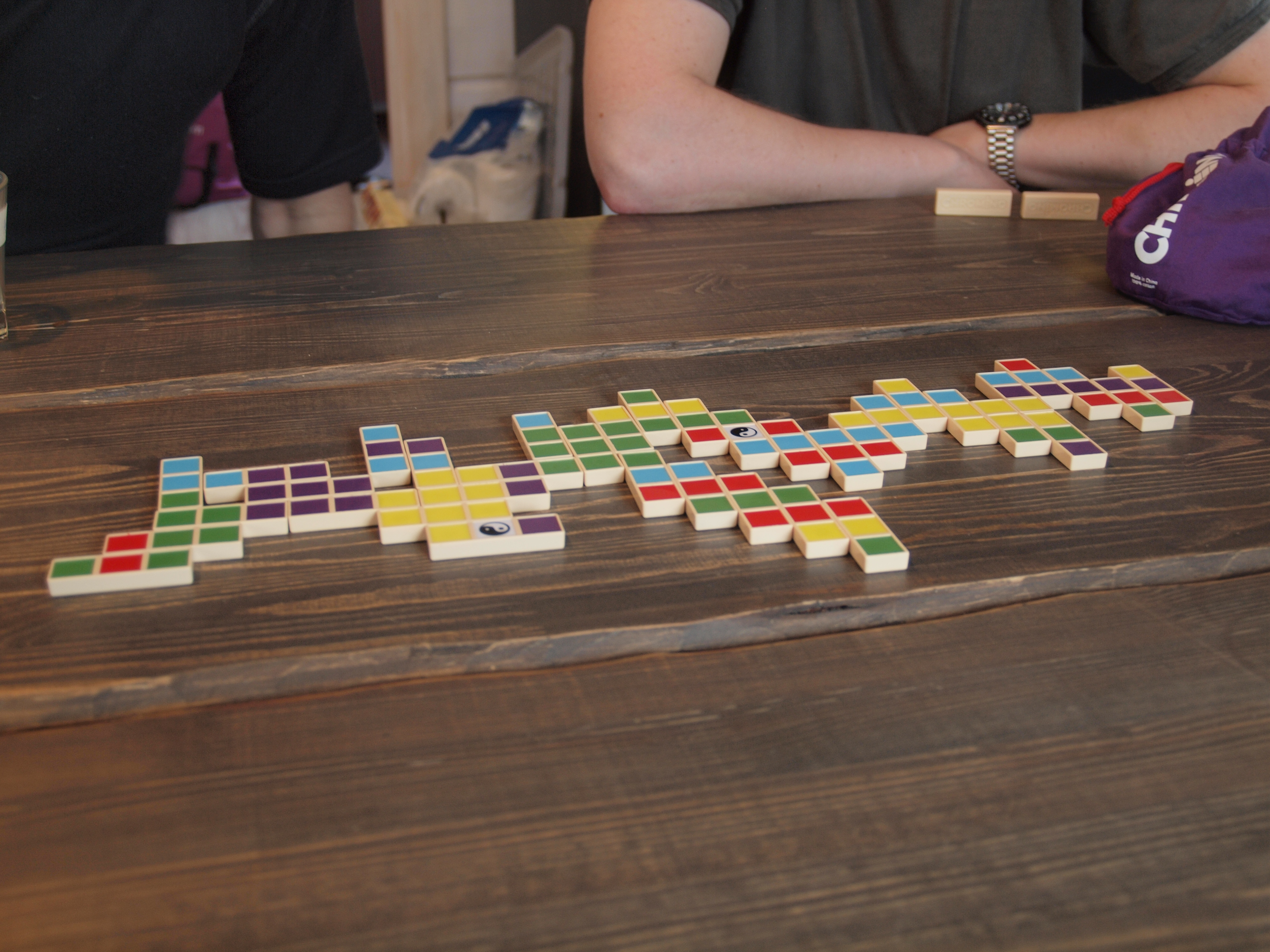
A game of Chromino at the end of play.

Chromino is a 2001 board game designed by Louis Abraham, for 2 to 7 players. The game is similar to the classic game of dominoes, but uses colours instead of numbers.

== Equipment ==
75 possible combinations, with duplicates greyed out

Five colours are used: red, blue, purple, yellow and green. Each Chromino piece contains three coloured squares laid out in a single row or column, and all 75 possible combinations of colours are used.

There are also five "wild card" pieces, with a yin-yang symbol in the middle, where the middle square may be used as any colour; the two ends of each "wild card" are both coloured in one of the five colours.

== Gameplay ==
The game begins with a randomly chosen "wild card" piece placed on the board. The rest of the pieces (79) are put in the bag and each player draws eight pieces.

The first turn is given to the youngest player and proceeds clockwise. On each player's turn, the player must take one of two actions:

- Place a piece from their hand, if a legal placement can be made
- Draw another piece from the bag, if no legal placement can be made with the pieces in that player's hand
  - If the drawn piece is able to be legally placed, the newly drawn piece is placed appropriately

Each piece has eight square edges. At least two edges must touch a piece already on the board for a legal placement, and squares of different colours may not touch each other.

When a player has one piece left, they should display it face-up to the other players. A "wild card" piece may not be used as the final piece. The first player to run out of pieces wins but play continues until the end of the round. There can be more than one winner.
