= Thiruthamizh =

Thiruthamizh is a Tamil-language board game based on the English-language game of Scrabble.

Invented by G. Rajakumar of Chennai in 1990, Thiruthamizh consists of a 21×21-grid board, and 272 tiles: 186 tiles which have letters in Tamil script, and 86 transparent tiles with diacritic marks such as dots and tails that, when combined with the letter tiles, give new letters.

In 2002, the Directorate of Tamil Development recommended the game to the Tamil Nadu state government for use in schools, as a means of building students' vocabularies.

The first World Championship of Thirutamizh is also being planned.
