= Counter Intelligence (board game) =

1989 board game

Counter Intelligence is a board game published in 1989 by Zzota Games.

== Contents ==
Counter Intelligence is a game in which each of two places acts as spy master in charge of three agents.

== Reception ==
Mark R Green reviewed Counter Intelligence for Games International magazine, and gave it 2 1/2 stars out of 5, and stated that "It is quite portable and has whiled away a few hours while waiting for trains to get the hang of their normal functions. However, my own feeling is that it could do with an extra level of activity to make it a really good game."
