= Blood Feud in New York =

2004 board game

Blood Feud in New York is a board game designed by filmmaker Kyle Weinandy and published by Eagle Games in 2004.

== Gameplay ==
On a large map of New York City, including all the suburbs in the boroughs of Queens and Brooklyn, players build up gangs of thugs, goons and hitmen. The players move around the city in limos, speedboats and helicopters to attack their enemies in order to take control of boroughs to earn income and hire more gangsters. Players can kill their enemy's boss and then control that gang or buy police protection and move around safely. When a player's family members congregate in a single borough, they are safe, but doing so earns the player no income bonuses; placing a family member in each borough allows the player to obtain bonuses to income, but then they are vulnerable to attack.

== Playing pieces and game board ==
The game includes over 300 highly detailed miniatures, including buildings, hitmen, gangsters, limousines, speedboats and helicopters (with rotors that spin). The game board features a detailed and highly accurate road map of New York and New Jersey.
