= The Golf Game: Par Excellence =

Board game

The Golf Game: Par Excellence is a board game published in 1985 by Challenge sprl that simulates a game of golf on famous golf courses.

== Description ==
The Golf Game: Par Excellence is a game for 1–4 players which simulates an 18-hole round of golf, using nine large laminated double-sided maps, each of which displays a hole from a famous golf course:

- 1st hole at Turnberry, Scotland
- 2nd hole at Merion (East course), United States
- 3rd hole at Oakmont, United States
- 4th hole at Muirfield, Scotland
- 5th hole at Sunningdale (Old Course), England
- 6th hole at Kagumigaseki, Japan
- 7th hole at Pine Valley, United States
- 8th hole at Nueva Andalucia, Spain
- 9th hole at Vilamoura, Portugal
- 10th hole at Carnoustie, Scotland
- 11th hole at Wentworth, England
- 12th hole at Augusta, United States
- 13th hole at Harbour Town Golf Links, United States
- 14th hole at St Andrews, Scotland
- 15th hole at Royal St. George's, England
- 16th hole at Cypress Point, United States
- 17th hole at Portmarnock, Ireland
- 18th hole at Pebble Beach, United States

Each map contains a review and commentary about the hole by Robert Green.

=== Other components ===
There are 13 "club" dice, one for each club that can be chosen, a Directional Die, and a Hazard die. There are also four different-coloured grease pencils.

=== Gameplay ===
The first player uses a grease pencil to mark the position of their ball on the first tee. The player then indicates the desired direction of their drive by placing the transparent "Golf Meter" on the map. The player selects which club they want to use by picking up the appropriate die and declares whether they want to hit straight, draw or fade. The player then rolls the club die and the Directional die, and marks the ball's new location on the map.

Play then continues with the next player's first shot.

=== Special rules ===
- If the ball landed in a Hazard, the player will also roll the Hazard die on their next shot.
- The Driver die can only be used from a tee box.
- Each hole has special rules associated with it. For example, on the first hole (Turnberry, Scotland), in the Half Rough indicated on the map, only the 9-iron die can be used, and the Hazard die must also be rolled; and in the Deep Rough, only the Wedge plus the Hazard die can be used.

== Publication history ==
General Games published a Dutch/French version in 1985. A multilingual version with rules in English, Dutch, French, German and Italian was published by Challenge sprl the same year.

== Reception ==
In Issue 4 of the UK games magazine Games International, Brian Walker stated that "This game should appeal to anyone with an interest in golf. If you've ever dreamed of teeing off at Cypress Point, California, now's your chance, for this is the next best thing." Walker concluded by rating the game 3 out of 5.

In his 1989 book Golf Gadgets, Ben Hogan called this game "ingenious". Hogan especially liked the text about each hole by Robert Green, calling Green's comments "incisive ... [the] commentary is rich with anecdotes and tactical advice." Hogan concluded that the game "is as much fun to look at and read as it is to play."
