= The London Game =

British board game

- Players: 2–6
- Setup time: 5 minutes
- Playing time: 1-2 hours
- Chance: Medium
- Age range: 7+
- Skills: Strategy, Geography

The London Game is a British board game based on the London Underground in London, England.

The game was first released in 1972 by the game company Condor. The game was re-released in 1997 to celebrate 25 years of the game's existence with a new all-colour board, with new cards.

== The game ==
The aim of the game is to start at one of five major stations (Paddington, Liverpool Street, King's Cross St Pancras, Victoria and Waterloo) before working your way around six other random stations in the central area, then returning to the terminal that you started from. However, the player has to navigate around certain things such as station blockages and hazard cards, as well as the mind of the other player.

Each player at the start gets dealt their six "souvenir cards". These cards consist of all of the main stations on the central tube, reaching as far out as Wembley, Arsenal and Oval.

Once the player has their cards, they can add two station blocks (closed station counters) on any station - except the main red ones. The players use small purple or blue counters to indicate this.

Once the player has done that, and chosen their main station to commence the game, it begins. There is a certain amount of strategy involved, as well as luck.

Players must move around the map to get along to their stations, so for example, if a player were at Lancaster Gate Underground station, and they rolled a two on the die, they could go to Notting Hill Gate in the west or Bond Street in the East.

Each time a player has to change lines (an inevitable outcome, considering the diversity geographically of the stations involved) they must pick up a "hazard card". There are roughly twenty types of hazard card, which say things like "You feel lonely. Join another player on the board" or "Forgot to buy gifts. Proceed to Oxford Circus at once to visit Hamleys". There are also other cards where you can send opponents wherever one may wish. Once you have carried out the card's instruction, you may proceed along the new line.

One of the main aims is to outfox the opponent. There are a large number of "Open/Close station" hazard cards, which allow the player to open one station and close another. By doing this, it is possible to block some players from moving, for example if they are located south of the river on the District line, by blocking off Earl's Court. Stations can be unblocked by rolling a six when within reach of a blocked station.

== Booklet ==
The accompanying booklet contains details on how to play the game, a list of every station in the central area, including which train lines that they are on, and factual information on the history of the underground.

== Reviews ==
- Games & Puzzles #3

== See also ==
- Scotland Yard
