= Triumph (board game) =

Board game

Triumph is a board game published in 1986 by Creative Crusade Ltd.

== Contents ==
Triumph is a game in which two to four players use tetrahedral pieces on a folding hexagon-shaped board.

== Reception ==
Eric Solomon reviewed Triumph for Games International magazine, and gave it 3 stars out of 5, and stated that "If you have a yen to play hexagonal Draughts, buy Triumph, but if you have a yen to take a great leap forward buy something else."
