= Aksharit =

2009 word game for Indian languages

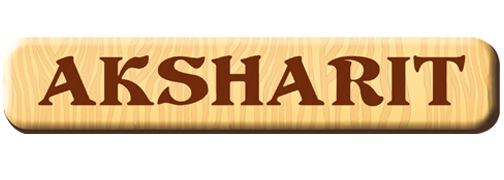
- Manufacturers: MadRat Games
- Publication: 2009; 17 years ago
- Genres: Word game Board game
- Players: 2–4
- Setup time: 2–6 minutes
- Playing time: ~50 minutes
- Chance: Medium (letters drawn)
- Skills: Vocabulary, spelling, anagramming, strategy, counting

Aksharit is a word game for Indian languages, developed and marketed by MadRat Games Pvt. Ltd. It is based on the Hindi language. and loosely inspired by crossword puzzles, but is purportedly designed to have specific pedagogical utility for Hindi language learning. Aksharit is used in 3,000 schools throughout India and has been used by over 300,000 children. It is also available in 10 other major Indian languages, as well as in digital form on Nokia's Symbian^{3} platform and on Intel AppUp. It has been a recipient of the Manthan Award and has been recognized at conferences such as TechSparks and INKtalks.

== History ==
Aksharit was conceptualized by Manuj Dhariwal, while he was pursuing his bachelor's degree in design from Indian Institute of Technology Guwahati, for his final year design project. In 2009, Manuj presented a business plan to market Aksharit at a business plan competition conducted by Indian Institute of Management Calcutta, which he went on to win. Rajat and Madhumita, both graduates in Computer Science and Engineering from IIT Bombay, had taken up teaching at Rishi Valley School in Andhra Pradesh. They had devised a number of innovative games to teach their respective courses. The three of them, came together and incorporated MadRat Games Pvt. Ltd in January 2009, with Aksharit as their flagship product. Aksharit is Patent Pending (Patent Number : 294/DEL/2010).

== Languages ==
Aksharit is available in 10 other major Indian languages, exclusive of Hindi. They are Tamil, Malayalam, Telugu, Kannada, Oriya, Urdu, Bengali, Gujarati, Marathi and Punjabi. Aksharit is available in two versions, Junior and Senior, for every language.

== Game rules ==
The senior version was designed for 2–8 players, above 10 years of age. Players have to form meaningful words on the board, given the constraints. Each player earns points on the basis of the word formed. There are specific points for each akshara tile. There are various positions on the board which lets the player earn point bonuses. The game ends when all the tiles supplied have been exhausted and the player with the highest points wins.

The junior version was designed for 2–8 players, below 10 years of age. It is designed like a crossword, where players need to match the correct akshara printed on the board, with the corresponding akshara tile to form words. Each word has a corresponding picture to help children remember the word meaning. Depending upon the words formed they advance on a board and the first player to reach the end of the board is declared the winner.
