= Squatter (game) =

- Players: 2–6
- Setup time: 5–10 minutes
- Playing time: 1–2 hours
- Chance: Medium
- Skills: Strategy, counting, probability

Squatter is a board game that was launched at the Royal Melbourne Show in 1962, invented by Robert (Bob) Crofton Lloyd. With more than 500,000 games sold in Australia by 2007, it became the most successful board game ever developed in Australia. As of 2018 there are still Squatter competitions and active Squatter clubs. In 1999, a version became available on PC CD-ROM. However the PC version was not commercially successful and is no longer available.

== Game play and components ==
Superficially, Squatter has the appearance of a Monopoly-type game. However, unlike Monopoly, all players remain in the game until the end. Players each start the game with their own sheep station and aim to be the first player to improve and irrigate their pastures and then fully stock their sheep station. Players run their sheep station as a business venture, to earn enough money to pay for the seasonal running expenses and to finance the improvements that are required to win the game. The Squatter game presents players with a mixture of strategy and luck that reflects the many challenges facing any form of livestock raising. These challenges include droughts, floods and bushfires, as well as disease, variable livestock prices, and luck.

The components of the game are stored in a cardboard box with a lid. The box depicts an Australian stockman herding sheep on horseback. The components consist of

- A square game board with a hexagonal layout representing 6 sheep stations and a Monopoly-like set of squares printed around the edges of the board that pieces move around
- Two "Ready Reckoner reference" cards
- Twenty-two "Tucker Bag" cards, five "Stud Ram" cards, twenty-six "Stock Sale" cards, five "Worm Control Programme" cards, five "Fertilized Pasture" cards, five "Control of Weeds and Insects" cards, thirty "Irrigated Pasture" cards and thirty "Improved Pasture" cards
- Two 6-sided dice
- Six playing pieces, six hay stack pieces, and one hundred and eighty sheep tokens
- Play money of various denominations

== Australian cultural significance ==
The game has been added to the collections Australian Stockman's Hall of Fame and Outback Centre as well as the National Wool Museum and the National Museum of Australia where in the Statement of Significance it quotes

"'Squatter's' focus on sheep farming reflects the inextricable link between this industry and Australian history more broadly." and "The 'Squatter' boardgame, which has been a household favourite in Australia for 45 years, offers players a rough simulation of life as a sheep farmer with all the daily trials and tribulations this entails."

== Criticism ==
The game has received some criticism in recent years (2016) with Mental Floss rating it number 8 in 14 justifiably forgotten Milton Bradley board games. Mental Floss's position is that:

"Some board games turn up the tension so high you practically sweat through your clothes. Squatter, an Australian import which brings home the high-stakes world of sheep-herding, is probably not one of them."

== Reviews ==
- Games & Puzzles
