= Sopwith (board game) =

1978 WWI aerial board wargame

- First edition, Goodtime Games, 1978
- Designers: David Dyer
- Publishers: Gametime Games
- Publication: 1978
- Genres: WWI Aerial Dogfight

Sopwith is a board wargame published by Gametime Games in 1978 that simulates aerial dogfights during World War I.

== Description ==
Dogfight is a wargame for two to six players in which each player controls an airplane and attempts to be the final survivor of six-way combat. The hexagonal hex grid board features the landscape of no man's land. Six different airplanes of the war are depicted on round counters. Tracks along the sides of the board are used to monitor damage and ammunition for each plane.

Each player has a landing strip in one of the six corners of the board, where only the owning player's airplane can refuel and take on more ammunition.

Before the game begins, a number of storm clouds are placed on the board, which diminish combat damage and can damage airplanes that fly into them. Storm clouds are moved randomly each turn.

=== Gameplay ===
Airplanes can move straight ahead, turn left or right, or sideslip, maintaining the same direction while moving sideways to the left or right.

Each turn is divided into three segments. All players reveal their movement simultaneously for the entire turn, as well as whether they are firing. If an airplane is directly in front of a firing aircraft, a fixed amount of damage is done; the closer the target, the more damage is done.

An airplane that runs out of damage points is destroyed. Airplanes can also fly off any edge of the board, removing themselves from combat. The final player on the board is the winner.

After several victories, a player may earn the title of "ace". This allows the player to do more damage, as well as gaining the ability to complete more difficult maneuvers.

== Publication history ==
Sopwith was designed by David Dyer, and published by Gametime Games, a division of Heritage Models, in 1978. The company went out of business in 1983, but by that time, Sopwith had become a popular play by mail (PBM) game, especially after a British wargamer named Tom Tweedy published a sub-zine within the pages of Chimaera titled Dib Dib Dib that was dedicated to Sopwith as a PBM game. (Tweedy later published Dib Dib Dib as a standalone zine.)

In 1985, David Dyer formed a new company, Gamer, in order to continue to publish Sopwith. In 1987, Gamer published a revised second edition of Sopwith.

== Reception ==
In Issue 33 of the British wargaming magazine Perfidious Albion, Charles Vasey and Geoffrey Barnard discussed the game. Vasey commented, "This is a very elegant piece of design work, of interest to anyone working on aircraft games. The plot method is fast, simple and effective. The available maneoeuvres handle the whole matter very well." Barnard agreed, replying, "This game is a masterpiece of simplicity, as it has almost no rules, is great fun and yet contains almost everything anyone but the most die-hard air-fanatic could possibly want from an air war game." Vasey concluded, "An excellent game for playing at a convention." Barnard concluded, "Massive congratulations to the designer ... this one will give hours and hours of good, clean fun."

In Craft, Model, and Hobby Industry Magazine, Rick Mataka noted, "Sopwith is a simple boardgame simulation of tactical aerial combat during WWI ... it can be recommended to beginners."

In Issue 77 of Games and Puzzles, Chris Quinn noted, "The game is best played with all six planes on the board in an Allied versus German scenario." Quinn concluded by giving the game a rating of 4 out of 6, saying, "it's great fun watching the other fellow miscalculate and shoot himself down!"

In the January 1985 issue of the British game magazine Imagine, Brian Creese commented, "Sopwith is, in many ways, an ideal game. Its rules are simple, and indeed the whole idea is very straightforward, and yet the resulting game is fiendishly difficult. There is also scope for many different styles of play." Creese pointed out that for PBM players, "By post it is an undemanding game. There is no pressure of time forcing you to make decisions, and you can analyse the various possible moves at your leisure." Given the excellence of the game, Creese was surprised that Gametime Games had gone out of business, noting, " It seems slightly astonishing, nevertheless, that a game whose popularity has increased dramatically over the past few years should have been unavailable during all that time."
