= Ave Caesar (board game) =

Board game published by Ravensburger

Ave Caesar is a board game published in 1989 by Ravensburger.

== Contents ==
Ave Caesar is a game in which cards determine the distance players move in the three laps of a chariot race.

== Reception ==
Brian Walker reviewed Ave Caesar for Games International magazine, and gave it 2 stars out of 5, and stated that "Our normal definition for a two-star rating is 'only if you are interested in the subject'. In this case modify that to read: 'only if you have designed a similar game yourself and are looking for some decent components'."

== Reviews ==
- Jeux & Stratégie #58
