= Upwords =

Board game

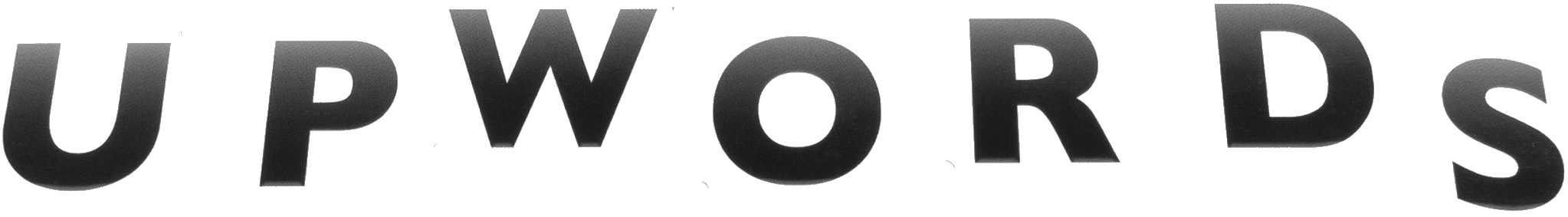

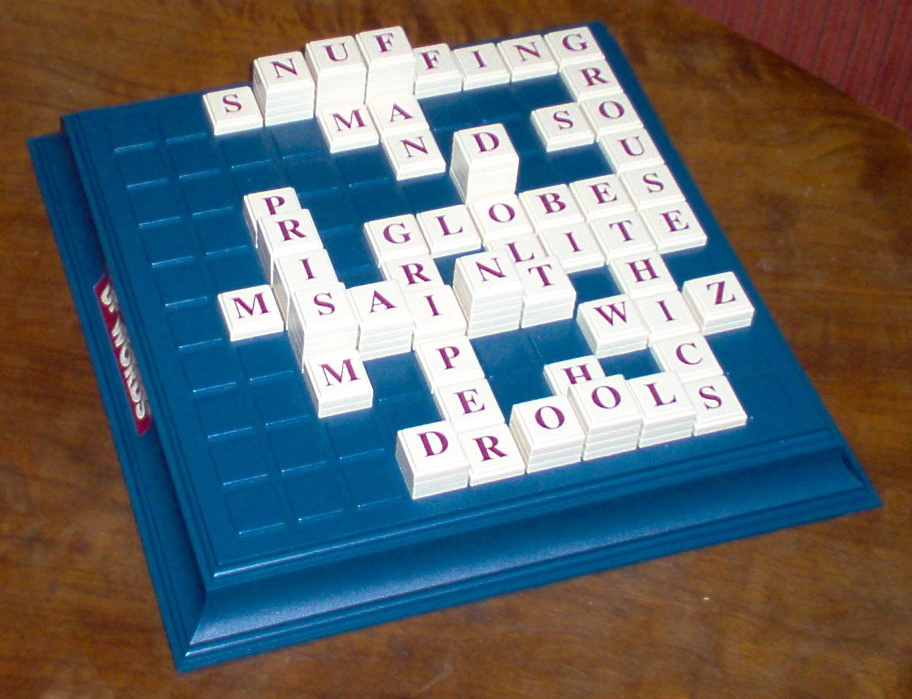
- Upwords board and tiles
- Other names: Crucimaster; Topwords; Scrabble Upwords
- Designers: Elliot Rudell
- Publishers: Milton Bradley; Spin Master
- Publication: 1982; 44 years ago
- Genres: board game
- Languages: English
- Players: 2 to 4
- Setup time: < 2 min
- Playing time: 45 to 90 minutes
- Chance: Medium
- Age range: 10+
- Skills: Mathematics, strategy, vocabulary
- Website: spinmaster.com/upwords

Related games
- Scrabble

Upwords is a board game. It was originally manufactured and marketed by the Milton Bradley Company, then a division of Hasbro. It has been marketed under its own name and also as Scrabble Upwords in the United States and Canada, and Topwords, Crucimaster, Betutorony, Palabras Arriba and Stapelwoord in other countries. It is currently available as a board game and a digital gaming app.

Upwords is a word game similar to Scrabble, with players building words using letter tiles on a gridded game board. Unlike Scrabble, in Upwords letters can be stacked on top of existing words to create new words. Scoring is determined by the number of letter tiles, including tiles in a stack, in a new word.

== History ==
Upwords was originally played on an 8×8 square board, with 64 letter tiles. Hasbro Europe later expanded the gameboard to a 10×10 matrix and 100 tiles, to accommodate the longer words frequently used in other languages such as German and Dutch. The 10×10 matrix is currently employed in worldwide versions of the game, with the "classic" 8×8 version also available.

== Gameplay ==
To determine play sequence, each player draws a tile; the player with the letter nearest to A will be the first to play. The tiles are returned to the draw pile.

Each player draws seven tiles to start the game. The first player forms a word with one or more of their tiles, and must place it so that the tiles cover at least one of the four central squares (e5, e6, f5, or f6). The player then draws more tiles to replace those played. Play continues clockwise.

Subsequent players may put tiles on the board adjacent to and/or on top of the tiles already played, as long as all words formed are found in the dictionary being used and the rules below are followed. All words must read horizontally from left to right, or vertically from top to bottom.

All tiles played on a turn must form part of one continuous straight line of tiles across or down.

For example, if the word CATER is on the board, a player could put a B and E in front of CATER and then put an L on top of the C and a D on top of the R to build BELATED.

Restrictions on words are as follows:

- No proper nouns
- No hyphenated words
- No words requiring an apostrophe
- No abbreviations or symbols
- No prefixes or suffixes which cannot stand alone
- No foreign words unless they are in the dictionary
- Players may not pluralize a word simply by adding an S at its end. However, such a play is allowed if the S is part of another complete word that is played onto the board in the same turn. This rule is intended to prevent players from capitalizing on one another's words without changing them or playing new ones.

Restrictions on stacking tiles are as follows:

- No stack may be more than five tiles high. This rule is intended to prevent the game from being dominated by a few tall stacks.
- No tile may be stacked directly onto a duplicate of itself.
- At least one tile or stack must be left unchanged; a player may not cover every letter in a word on a single turn.

A player may choose to pass at any time, or discard one tile and draw a replacement instead of playing. Once the draw pile is exhausted, the game ends when any player runs out of tiles, or every player passes in a single round. In some versions of the game it doesn't end when a player runs out of tiles, only when all pass or all the tiles are played.

== Scoring ==
Any word with no stacked letters scores two points per tile, while a word containing stacked letters scores one point for every tile it contains. In the CATER/BELATED example above, CATER would score 10 points, while BELATED would score nine. Two bonus points are awarded for using the "Qu" tile in a one-level word, and 20 for using all seven tiles in one turn. If changing two words at once, both words must be legal.

Players lose five points for every unused tile they hold at the end of the game.

== Letter distribution ==
Letter distribution (8×8 version down, 10×10 version across)
	×1	×2	×3	×4	×5	×6	×7	×8
×1	J Qu V X Z	K W	F					
×2		Y	B G H	C	R			
×3			P		D L M N U	S		
×4					T		I O	
×5							A	
×6								E

The letter distribution of the 8×8 version of Upwords is as follows:

64 tiles:

1 of each: F, J, K, Qu, V, W, X, Z

2 of each: B, C, G, H, R, Y

3 of each: D, L, M, N, P, S, U

4 of each: I, O, T

5 of each: A

6 of each: E

The letter distribution of the 10×10 version of Upwords is as follows:

100 tiles:

1 of each: J, Qu, V, X, Z

2 of each: K, W, Y

3 of each: B, F, G, H, P

4 of each: C

5 of each: D, L, M, N, R, T, U

6 of each: S

7 of each: A, I, O

8 of each: E

== Electronic versions ==
In the early 1990s, Hasbro licensed electronic marketing rights to Microsoft, briefly making the game available electronically. Microsoft no longer has rights to Upwords.

An app was released under license for iOS devices in 2013, with an Android version following in 2014.

== Reviews ==
- Family Games: The 100 Best
