= Den vises sten =

Den vises sten ('the philosopher's stone', an editorial title for a text unnamed in its manuscript) is a fourteenth-century Swedish poem about the Philosopher's Stone.

== Form ==
The poem is in a metre uniquely complex for medieval Swedish literature. The poem comprises twelve verses, each of 13 lines, rhyming AABCCBDEDEFFE; most lines have four stresses and either masculine or feminine rhymes, but lines 3, 6, 8, 10, and 13 (i.e. rhymes b and e) have three stresses and feminine rhymes.

== Content ==
The poem relates the characteristics of a wondrous stone, which can endow people with wisdom and strength, restore people's health (including curing blindness, deafness, and lameness), and even raise people from the dead. The poem is much concerned with how the mestare ('master, scholar') who holds it must keep it from the clutches of his enemies. The poem uses the stone as an allegory for God's love and the prospect of salvation it can bring.

Stephen A. Mitchell has argued that the poem demonstrates fourteenth-century Sweden's up-to-date engagement with Continental trends not only in Christian mystic literature but also in alchemical writing. (He also suggests that ‘the poem seems to allude to pagan mythological and heroic motifs (i.e. the stories of Askr, Embla, and Brynhildr)’, but this has not been accepted as certain.)

== Provenance ==
The poem occurs in one manuscript, UUB C 391, which was produced in 1379 in the milieu of Sturkarus Thurgili, a monk of Vadstena monastery. It is one of only two Swedish rhymed poems to be preserved in a manuscript of the same century as it was composed.

== Editions ==
- Geete, Robert (ed.), Den vises sten: En hittils okänd rimdikt från 1300-talet, efter en upsalahandskrift från år 1379, Småstycken på forn svenska, andra serien (Stockholm: Svenska fornskriftsällskapet, 1900).
