= The Dragonlords =

Board game

The Dragonlords is a 1978 board game published by Fantasy Games Unlimited.

== Gameplay ==
The Dragonlords is a two-player fantasy combat boardgame, where the two largest nations on the peninsula of Anador, each under the rule of a wizard-emperor, seek to gain control of the three minor countries that lie between them, as well as overall control of the entire peninsula.

Before play begins, each player chooses what type of wizard to be: Sorcerer, Enchanter, Illusionist or Necromancer. The class chosen will dictate which of the 33 spells listed in the rulebook each player can use.

The game comes with a rule booklet, a paper map, and die-cut counters representing infantry, missile troops, cavalry, flying units, and various leaders. There are also counters for bookkeeping, ships and garrison units for minor countries' castles.

== Reception ==
In the November 1978 edition of Dragon, S. List thought this game strongly resembled Avalon Hill's wargame Blitzkrieg: two warring nations encroach on neutral countries in order to invade each other. List thought the components were "utilitarian rather than elegant", and didn't like the "muddy printing" on the counters, but found the rules were well written, and gameplay very fast. List recommended the game, saying, "This game is not overly sophisticated, nor is it a physically beautiful thing. But it is quite easy to learn and enjoyable to play, and it is worth acquiring.

In the November 1981 edition of The Space Gamer (Issue No. 45), Bob Popham and Chris Czarra found several holes in the rules, as well as a lack of story background, and did not recommend it: "As the designers state in the introduction, The Dragonlords requires more imagination than most games. Unfortunately, much of this imagination will have to be spent on the rules and background."
