= Sentinels of the Multiverse =

Board game

- Cover art
- Designers: Christopher Badell; Adam Rebottaro; Paul Bender
- Publishers: Greater Than Games
- Players: 3 to 5
- Setup time: 5 minutes
- Playing time: 45–60 minutes
- Ages: 13 and up

Sentinels of the Multiverse is a cooperative card game published by Greater Than Games and released at Gen Con 2011. Players control a team of comic book-style heroes battling a villain. Each player controls one or more heroes, while a villain and environment deck each run themselves. A given game includes 3 to 5 heroes, 1 villain and 1 environment, which can be mixed and matched to create a number of different scenarios. The core game comes with 10 heroes, 4 villains, and 4 environments. The board game has also been made into a video game.

== Gameplay ==
Sentinels of the Multiverse is a cooperative card game for up to five players. The game mechanics of Sentinels of the Multiverse include aspects that are somewhat similar to other modern card games, including Magic: The Gathering and Dominion.

The game is played with three different types of card decks: heroes, villains, and environments.

- Hero decks typically include one card that represents the hero, and a deck of forty other cards representing ongoing abilities, equipment, and one-shots that can be played. Most heroes have alternate character cards that slightly change how the hero plays without changing their deck.
- Villain decks also typically include one card representing the villain, and twenty-five other cards with one-shots, ongoings, minions, devices, and other types of cards.
- Environment decks represent the environment in which the heroes battle the villain. Cards in this deck include persistent effects that remain in play until certain conditions are met, one-shots, and neutral targets. Environments are not aligned to either the heroes or the villain, though some environments are more helpful to the heroes than others.

Heroes, villains, and other targets can all be damaged by damage dealt from any source. Damage has a type, such as melee, projectile, fire, or toxic damage, and certain cards can be used to boost or protect against specific types of damage.

The game is played with three to five heroes, one villain, and one environment. Each villain card has two different sides that change the way the villain acts, and the card has rules for when it should flip. Some flip frequently over the course of a game, while other villains flip only once. Villains also have an optional "advanced" rule that makes them more difficult to fight for an added challenge.

The Villain turn is first, followed by each hero in turn, followed by the environment turn, constituting one round of play. Play continues in turn until the heroes have won or lost. The villain and environment each play the top card of their deck on every turn, and heroes may play a card, use a power, and then draw a card.

There are three editions of the game in total. The original game was published in 2011. The Enhanced Edition followed in 2012, including tokens in the box and making several balance changes to the rules to scale appropriately to the number of heroes. Several expansions were released for the enhanced edition, including individual hero packs. In 2021, the Definitive Edition was published - another evolution of the rules with revised artwork.

Regardless of edition, each core set provides multiple hero, villain and environment decks. Expansions provide further heroes, villains, and environments, often themed to a setting or concept.

== Concept and development ==
Sentinels was conceived by Christopher Badell. He had been playing various comic-book related games, but found that most of them were based on having just two characters directly engaging each other, and wanted instead one "about people with different abilities and different outlooks getting together to beat an overwhelming threat in a weird environment". This led to the basis of Sentinels.

Badell teamed up with artist Adam Rebottaro to craft the first set. Badell worked on creating a fictional comic-book universe inspired by the long histories developed by both DC and Marvel Comics. Badell crafted a timeline of stories that would be published in the fictional "Sentinel Comics" imprint label, enabling him to develop characters and write the flavor text for each card. The initial set featured five heroes inspired by the Avengers, and with characters representing amalgams of established superheroes, such as Legacy blending aspects of both Superman and Captain America. Expansions generally include characters inspired by side plots from the main storyline. Badell also considered the history of comic book publishing when developing characters. One character, Chrono Ranger, a sheriff with time-manipulation powers, was conceived as the result of Sentinel Comics starting out as a cowboy-story publisher and grandfathering this character from their earlier works into superhero settings, akin to Groot's publication history. This also led to variations on heroes reflecting comics' frequent shifting of alliances, with most of the same powers but subtly different effects.

Badell had anticipated that Sentinels would be a limited series based on his narrative approach; he wrote flavor text pointing to an ultimate event to be revealed with the final expansion, "Sentinels of the Multiverse: Oblivaeon". Badell will still continue to support projects based on Sentinels, including a miniature tabletop adaption of the game in Sentinel Tactics, and looks to actually develop comic books based on the Sentinel Comics label.

== Reception ==
Sentinels of the Multiverse has been well received by players and critics since its launch, with Tom Vasel of The Dice Tower podcast giving it the #1 slot in his "top 30 games to look out for from Gen Con 2011", and the review blog Giant Fire Breathing Robot awarding it "Board Game of the Year: 2011". Reviewers generally praised the art and gameplay, while criticizing the small box, lack of HP trackers, and difficulty scaling among different numbers of players.

== Expansions ==
Greater Than Games released an expansion, Sentinels of the Multiverse: Rook City in the spring of 2012. The expansion added 2 heroes, 4 villains and 2 environments to the base game. The villains in Rook City also include an H icon in some cards, which represents the number of heroes in the game, as a way to improve difficulty scaling. The cards used in Rook City are also of a better and thicker cardstock as compared to the original base game.

In the autumn of 2012 Greater Than Games released their second expansion, Sentinels of the Multiverse: Infernal Relics. Similar to Rook City, this expansion added an additional 2 heroes, 4 villains and 2 environments to the game. This expansion also introduced the concept of a super villain group, containing multiple villain characters in a single deck.

At the same time as Infernal Relics, Greater Than Games also released a new edition of the base game, Sentinels of the Multiverse: Enhanced Edition. This edition of the game has minor changes to some of the cards, added tokens to help keep track of damage and modifiers, and added the H icon to the base game's villains to improve their scalability.

In spring of 2013, Greater Than Games released the third Expansion, Sentinels of the Multiverse: Shattered Timelines. Similar to Rook City and Infernal Relics, this expansion added 2 heroes, 4 villains, and 2 environments to the game. The Shattered Timelines expansion featured the winning fan-created villain from the Create a Villain Contest run by Greater Than Games in September 2012. The expansion was supported by a Kickstarter campaign that ended successfully on November 29, 2012, having raised $185,200.

During the Shattered Timelines Kickstarter Campaign, Greater Than Games announced that they would use some of the funds raised during that campaign to help finance their fourth expansion Sentinels of the Multiverse: Vengeance. This expansion added 5 heroes, 5 villains, and 2 environments. The new villains have smaller decks than previous villains, as they're designed to be played in a new game mode as a party against the heroes. Vengeance is available as of February 2014. During this time Greater Than Games also released the box set Rook City & Infernal Relics, discontinuing the production of separate boxes for Rook City and Infernal Relics.

The Vengeance box included an advertisement for an upcoming expansion, Wrath of the Cosmos, later released in January 2015. This expansion included 2 heroes, 4 villains and 2 environments. The preorder campaign was largely successful and added 1 more hero, 1 villain, and 1 environment along with 6 hero promos.

The Villains of the Multiverse Expansion, released in December 2015, reintroduces some old villains as well as some new ones, using the Vengeance combat mechanic of having one villain per hero character. This expansion includes ten new villain decks with over-sized villain character cards and four new environment decks. The preorder campaign also allowed the release of 1 promo villain and 1 promo environment, as well as 7 promo hero character cards.

On October 16, 2014, an iOS/Android version was released followed on December 22, 2014 with a Steam release for the PC.

On January 29, 2016, Greater Than Games announced the title of the next expansion, "OblivAeon". They stated that this would be the final expansion for Sentinels of the Multiverse. That Kickstarter ended on March 11, 2016 with 9,982 backers raising $1,518,321. The OblivAeon expansion was released in 2018.

== Video game adaptation ==
Reception

Aggregate score
Aggregator	Score
Metacritic	iOS: 78/100

Review score
Publication	Score
TouchArcade	iOS: 3/5

Handelabra Games adapted the board game into a 2014 video game that was released on iOS and Android devices on October 15, 2014, and for Microsoft Windows, OS X, and Linux computers on December 22. 2014.

The game features both single and multiplayer options as with the board game, and otherwise follows the same rules as the board game, and allowing for the same variation in challenge based on which heroes, villains, and environments were used. The game shipped with a base set of ten heroes, four villains, and four environments, and included additional downloadable content that aligned with the board game's expansions.

Critical reception for Sentinels of the Multiverse has been mostly positive and the game holds a rating of 78/100 on Metacritic, based on 5 reviews. Conor Lorenz of Gizorama gave particular attention to the auto-save function which saves the current battle if the iPad closes down for whatever reason. Andrew Fretz of TouchArcade says that "The app is solidly constructed" but "I don't think there is much meaningful strategy in the game." Brad Cummings of BoardGameGeek gave the app 4/5 stars, concluding "The gameplay that has made this game a cult hit shines bright in this digital version...This is a must have addition to your digital board game collection." He noted that "a lack of information in some parts of the game" may make it hard for new players to keep track of everything happening.

== Definitive Edition ==
In 2021, Greater Than Games announced that they would be releasing a new edition of Sentinels of the Multiverse, labeled Definitive Edition. The new version would feature various updates to the game, such as updated keywords and turn phases, meant to streamline gameplay, as well as brand new art meant to mimic different eras of comic book history. Greater Than Games planned to rerelease all existing Sentinels of the Multiverse content across a core box and five expansions. The core box was released in 2022, and contained 12 heroes, 6 villains, and 6 environments.
