= Summit (game) =

Cold War board wargame

- Publishers: Milton Bradley
- Publication: 1961
- Players: 2 to 6
- Setup time: > 5 minutes
- Playing time: > 1 hour
- Chance: Med
- Age range: adult
- Skills: Strategy, Making Allies and Enemies, Planning for the future
- Similar to Risk's theme, but with its own set of rules.

Summit is a Cold War board wargame introduced in 1961 by Milton Bradley as "The Top Level Game of Global Strategy", with an updated release in 1971. Each player chooses one of the major powers from the 1950s/1960s era and controlled their economic and military buildup during each turn, much like Risk.

== Board ==
The board is an azimuthal projected map of the Earth looking down at the North Pole. Each of the six playable "countries" are different bright colors while unplayable regions are various shades of brown depending on their economic and military "value". The six countries and their colors are:

- United States (Blue)
- Russia (Red)
- China (Yellow)
- India (Green)
- Western Europe (Purple)
- South America (Orange)

The regions in brown are:

- Canada
- Mexico
- Central America
- Central Africa
- South Africa
- Eastern Europe
- Arab Bloc
- Near East
- Southeast Asia
- Philippines
- Far East
- Australia

Each of the player countries are worth 10 points, while the brown regions vary from 2, 4, 6, and 8.

== Pieces ==
For the board is a small circlet holder with colored flags to remind players which countries are in alliance. This piece is largely viewed as a gimmick, though various house rules may have different uses for these pieces.

Each player may build, in their captured regions, a balance of factories, mills (both square), and military bases (round).

Each player is awarded every turn a number of I-Beams, red Military Threat chips, white Popular Support chips, and black Economic Pressure chips. The I-Beams are produced by a player's Mills and are used to build more Factories, Bases, and Mills. Economic Pressure chips come from the amount of Mills a player owns. Popular Support chips come from the number of Factories one owns. Military Threat chips come from the number of Bases one has.

There is also a set of cards with various situations that players must respond to. They can be as simple as gaining two I-Beams, to losing three red chips. The cards are similar to the community chest and chance cards of Monopoly.

== Strategy ==
Allies are welcomed and may help struggling players get out of trouble, or create an unbeatable force that will crush the remaining weak players. Eventually though everyone must defeat their opponents to win the game. The game calls for a balance of social skills, economic knowledge, and military tactics.

== Premonition of the Cuban Missile Crisis ==
One of the primary strategies of the game is to threaten an invasion by deploying one's military and economic power cards unless an opposing player dismantles their bases in one of the brown regions. This scenario came true one year after the game was released in the Cuban Missile Crisis of 1962 when U.S. President John F. Kennedy demanded that the Soviet Union dismantle its bases in Cuba and the world came close to the brink of nuclear war. After the crisis was over, sales of the game shot up.

== Other ==
One of the most often pointed out quotes from the Rules Book is: "Compare some of the plays you are making with the international news of the day. Quite often it will coincide with the play of the game."

== Reviews ==
- The Playboy Winner's Guide to Board Games
