= Figure It Out (board game) =

1998 board game

The Figure It Out board game was based on the popular children's game show Figure It Out on Nickelodeon. It was produced by Cardinal Games in 1998 and included a Billy the Answer Head board that was coated to allow for writing and erasing with crayon, two sets of game cards, and a timer.

== Players ==
This game was designed to be played with 2 to 6 players with a recommended minimum age of 7.

== Objective ==
A round was won by figuring out the contestant's secret.

== Components ==
The game consisted of the following components:

- A Billy the Answer Head game board
- 46 prepared Answer cards (Each card contained 2 verbal clues, a charade clue, a secret slime action, and a consequence for the secret slime action)
- 4 blank Answer cards (For customization)
- 3 prize decks (first round, second round, and grand prizes.)
- A Figure It Out timer
- A crayon

== Game play ==
=== Setup ===
Separate the game cards into 4 separate decks for Answer cards, first round prize cards, second round prize cards, and Grand prize cards. Place the brace on the bottom of Billy the Answer Head so it is freestanding.

=== First round ===
One player is designated as the contestant. The other player(s) are designated as the panel. The contestant picks an Answer card without revealing it to the panel. The number of words in the answer is revealed to the panel. Any words in parentheses are written on Billy the Answer Head before the time begins. The timer is turned completely counterclockwise and started. During the timed interval, panel members ask 'yes' or 'no' questions. The same panelist continues asking questions until a question is answered 'no', at which point the next panelist begins asking questions. If a panelist says a word that is part of the answer, the timer is stopped, the word is written on Billy the Answer Head, and then the timer (and questions) resume. If, at the end of the round, the complete answer has not been discovered, the contestant selects a card from the first round prize deck.

=== Second round ===
At the beginning of the second round, the contestant reads the first verbal clue. The timer is turned completely counterclockwise and started. The timed interval continues the same as during the first round. If, at the end of the round, the complete answer has not been discovered, the contestant selects a card from the second round prize deck.

=== Third round ===
At the beginning of the third round, the contestant reads the second verbal clue. The timer is turned completely counterclockwise and started. The timed interval continues the same as during the first two rounds. If, at the end of the round, the complete answer has not been discovered, the game enters the charade round.

=== Charade round ===
During the charade round the timer is turned completely counterclockwise and started. During the timed interval the contestant acts out the Charade Clue (marked with an asterisk (*) on the Answer card.) During this time the panel uses this clue to try to guess answer. If the answer has not been guessed by the end of this round, the contestant wins and draws a card from the Grand Prize deck. The roll of contestant then moves on to the next player.

=== Secret slime action ===
Answer cards list a secret slime action and a corresponding consequence. During the rounds of play the contestant watches for the panel to perform the secret slime action. If someone does perform this action, the contestant announces Slime Action, the timer is stopped, and the slime action consequence is revealed to the panelist being penalized. This consequence must then be performed by the panelist. The timer is then restarted and play resumes as normal.

== Blank answer cards ==
Two blank doublesided answer cards are included with the game, allowing for game owners to fill in up to 4 custom answers with appropriate clues and slime actions with consequences.

== See also ==
- List of board games
