= Acronymble =

1991 board game

- Designers: Steven May
- Publishers: Acronymwits Ltd.
- Publication: 1991
- Genres: Family word game

Acronymble is a board game published by Acronymwits in 1991 that involves making amusing acronyms. It was also the name of a game show spoof based on the game that aired on public access television in the 1990s.

== Description ==
Acronymble is a game for 3–8 players that challenges players to move their token around a game board by creating acronyms (known as "noodles") from a random sequence of letters.

=== Components ===
The game box comes with a game board, a timer, two decks of cards ("Length" and "Composition"), tokens and a small cloth bag of letter tiles.

=== Gameplay ===
One player is chosen as the "Nymwit" for the round. The Nymwit:

1. Draws a card from the Composition card to determine the conditions for answer composition.
2. Draws a Length card to determine how many letter tiles to draw (from 3 to 7).
3. Rolls a die to determine how many minutes the players have.
4. Draws the proper number of letter tiles from the bag. These are the letters that all players must use in the order they were drawn.

The Nymwit then starts the timer to start the round. All players except the Nymwit then must make a "noodle" (acronym) from the letters drawn, in the order they were drawn.

Example: The Nymwit draws the letters E U M G. One player might come up with "Elvis Unglued My Grandfather", and another, "Eek!!! Ugly Man-eating Gerbils!"

The Composition card drawn may have an effect on play. There are four possible cards:

1. The usual play
2. Nonsense Word: The players must add a nonsense word to their noodle.
3. All the Same Letter: Only one letter is drawn, and all words in the noodle must start with the letter (e.g. S.S.S.S.S.)
4. A starting letter and a length are given. Players then must come up with a word of that length that starts with that letter, and then construct a noodle from the word. Example: A 6-letter word that starts with "G". One player might choose the word "GIGGLE" and then compose the noodle Granny Is Glowing, Growing Little Eggplants.

When the timer goes off, players vote for their favorite acronym using a blind voting process where they are not allowed to vote for their own noodle. Votes are counted by the Nymwit, and players' tokens are moved along the game board according to the number of votes received.

The next player becomes the Nymwit and play continues.

=== Victory conditions ===
The first player to have their token cross the finish line is the winner.

== Publication history ==
Acronymble was designed by Steven May, who founded Acronymwits Inc. and published the game in 1991.

=== Television show ===
Steven May produced a game show spoof based on Acronymble that he hosted using the pseudonym "Mr. E. Nymwit." The show, co-hosted and directed by Daniel Small, aired on Pittsfield Public Access Television and won the Massachusetts Cable Commission award for "Best Entertainment and Variety Show" in 1997.

== Reception ==
Martha Cheney, in her book "How to Develop Your Child's Gifts and Talents in Vocabulary", commented, "There is no winner or loser, only lots of laughs and mental exercise."

Bernard de Koven, writing for Deep Fun, called it "most definitely a party game, and most assuredly a game that will make you laugh." de Koven also noted, "The rules are written with enough humor and playfulness to keep people from taking the rules too seriously – there are constant invitations to make up your own rules, suggestions like 'If a player doesn’t finish in time, don’t disqualify them (maybe drum your fingers or whistle a bit).'" de Koven concluded, "Whistle and drum we did. Laugh a lot we also did. Major FUN was most definitely had."
