= Triopoly (board game) =

Triopoly is a board game by Reveal Entertainment. It plays in much the same way as Monopoly, except that it has three tracks of properties instead of one, and additional buildings which may be constructed on squares. The tracks of the board are arranged concentrically, the middle two being slightly raised to form a ziggurat.

The game was invented in 1989 by Jeffrey Berndt, drawing inspiration from a five-hour game of Monopoly and the Tri-Dimensional Chess game he had seen an episode of Star Trek the following day. The game was co-designed and illustrated by Jeremy Parrish and Chris Hornbaker. The game was licensed to Reveal Entertainment, Inc., a company co-founded by Berndt, Maynard and Judy Gulley and Borden Duffel. The company raised funds to publish the game in 1997. The game won several awards and was named one of the "Best New Games" by Good Housekeeping and Games World of Puzzles.

The game can be played on one level, two levels or three levels, allowing players to decide the length of game they desire to play. Travel spaces allow players to move up and down levels with 'mini airline' tickets; or, an elevator that allows players to choose the level they desire to play. Players improve properties by building gas stations, shopping malls and skyscrapers.
