= Parker Brothers =

American toy and game manufacturer

- Logo used since 1981
- Formerly: George S. Parker Company (1883-1888); Parker Brothers (1888-1901); Parker Brothers, Inc. (1901-1998)
- Type: Brand
- Industry: Entertainment
- Founded: 1883; 143 years ago
- Founder: George Swinnerton Parker
- Defunct: 1998; 28 years ago (company)
- Fate: Purchased by Hasbro in 1991; merged with Milton Bradley and reincorporated as "Hasbro Games" in 1998. Remained as a brand until 2009.
- Successor: Hasbro Games
- Headquarters: Salem, Massachusetts, US
- Products: Board games Electronic games Jigsaw puzzles
- Brands: Cluedo; Monopoly; Scrabble
- Owner: General Mills (1968-1985); Kenner Parker Toys (1981-1985); Tonka (1985-1991); Hasbro (1991-present)

Parker Brothers (known as Parker outside of North America) was an American toy and game manufacturer which in 1991 became a brand of Hasbro. More than 1,800 games were published under the Parker Brothers name since 1883.

Parker Brothers remained family owned until bought in 1968, and branched into Nerf toys and media. Among its products were Monopoly, Clue (licensed from the British publisher and known as Cluedo outside of North America), Sorry!, Risk, Trivial Pursuit, Ouija, Aggravation, Bop It, Scrabble (under a joint partnership with Milton Bradley in the United States and Canada), and Probe. In 2009, the trade name ceased use, with former products being marketed under the "Hasbro Gaming" label, with the logo shown on Monopoly games.

== History ==
=== Early success ===
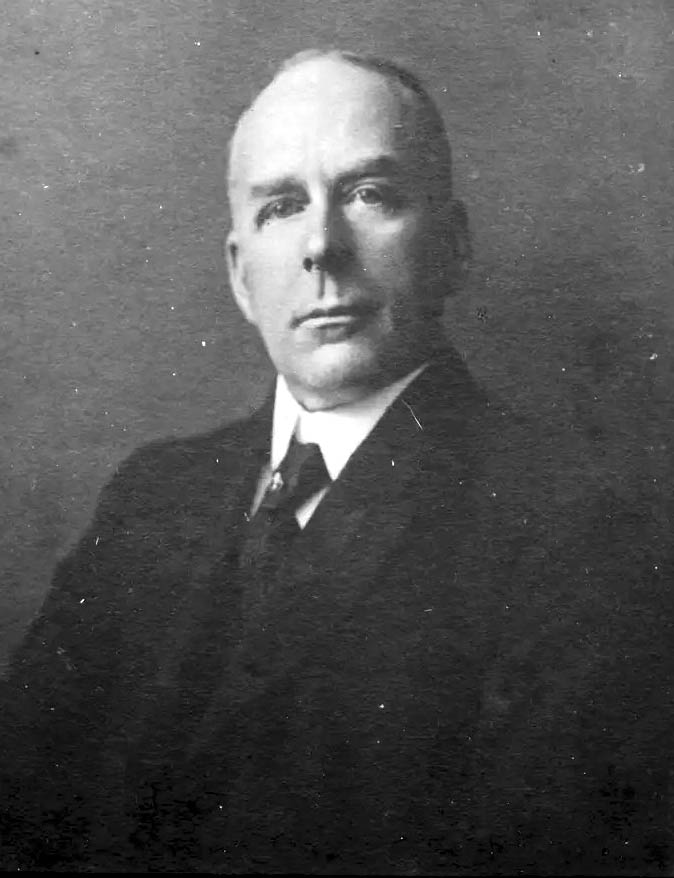
George Swinnerton Parker, founder

Parker Brothers was founded by George Swinnerton Parker. Parker's philosophy deviated from the prevalent theme of board game design; he believed that games should be played for enjoyment and did not need to emphasize morals and values. He created his first game, Banking, in 1883 when he was 16. Banking is a game in which players borrow money from the bank and try to generate wealth by guessing how well they could do. The game includes 160 cards which foretell their failure or success. The game was so popular among family and friends that his brother, Charles Parker, urged him to publish it. George approached two Boston publishers with the idea, but was unsuccessful. Not discouraged, he spent $40 to publish 500 sets of Banking. He eventually sold all but twelve copies, making a profit of $100.

Parker founded his game company, initially called the George S. Parker Company, in his hometown of Salem, Massachusetts in 1883. When George's brother Charles joined the business in 1888, the company's name was changed to its more familiar form. In 1898 a third brother, Edward H. Parker, joined the company. For many years, George designed most of the games himself, and wrote all the rules. Many games were based on important events of the day: Klondike was based on the Klondike Gold Rush, and War in Cuba was based on the impending Spanish–American War.

The game industry was growing, and the company was becoming very profitable. In 1906, Parker Brothers published the game Rook and it became the best-selling game in the country. During the Great Depression, a time when many companies went out of business, Parker Brothers released a new board game called Monopoly. Although the company had originally rejected the game in 1934, they decided to publish it the next year. It was a success, and the company had difficulty keeping up with demand. The company continued to grow throughout the next several decades, producing games including Cluedo (released as Clue in North America), Risk, and Sorry!

=== 1960s and onwards ===
Even after George Parker's death, the company remained family-owned until 1968 when General Mills purchased the company. After this, Parker Brothers produced the first Nerf ball. In the UK during the 1970s, Parker Brothers sold the rights of some games to the games division of Palitoy (also a General Mills company), and produced a variety of releases such as Escape from Colditz. In 1977, the company built its headquarters in Beverly, Massachusetts.

In early 1983, Parker Brothers spent US$15 million establishing a book publishing branch; their first titles featured the American Greetings franchises, Care Bears and Strawberry Shortcake. The branch published twelve titles by February 1984; sales of these books totaled 3.5 million units. Parker Brothers also operated a record label around the same time; one of its releases, Cabbage Patch Dreams, was based on Coleco's Cabbage Patch Kids and involved Tom and Stephen Chapin. It was certified Gold by the Recording Industry Association of America (RIAA) in July 1984.

In 1985, General Mills merged the company with their subsidiary Kenner; this new company, Kenner Parker Toys Inc., was acquired by Tonka in 1987. In 1988, Parker Brothers struck a deal with Martindale/Gilden Productions to develop television game shows, such as Boggle.

Tonka, including Parker Brothers, was bought in 1991 for about $516 million by Hasbro which also owned the Milton Bradley Company. Following the acquisition, Parker Brothers continued to have its corporate offices in Beverly, but production of the games were moved to Milton Bradley's headquarters in East Longmeadow. In 1998, Parker Brothers and Milton Bradley were consolidated at the new Hasbro Games campus (based in the former address of Parker Brothers' headquarters) to merge together and form Hasbro Games. Milton Bradley and Parker Bros. subsequently turned into two separate brands of Hasbro before being retired in 2009 in favor of the Hasbro brand.

=== Puzzles ===
Parker Brothers marketed its first jigsaw puzzle in 1887. The most famous of their puzzle lines was the Pastime brand, which made hand-cut wooden puzzles from 1908 to 1958. Parker also produced children's puzzles, as well as the Climax, Jig-A-Jig, Jig Wood, Jig-Saw Picture Puzzle, and Paramount lines. According to Jigsaw Puzzles: An Illustrated History and Price Guide, by Anne D. Williams, Parker Bros. closed the Pastime line in 1958 and their die-cut puzzles were phased out in the late 1970s.

=== Video games ===
Parker Brothers had a reputation for quality family-oriented and licensed games. The company released Merlin in 1978, and sold 700,000 units before Christmas and had a sales total of $100 million in 1979.

It began to produce electronic versions of popular Parker Brothers board games in the late 1970s. The company ventured into the toy market with the electronic action figure, Rom the Space Knight, in 1979. Although the toy proved a failure, the licensed comic book published by Marvel Comics ran for years after the toy was discontinued.

Parker Brothers spent $50,000 to reverse-engineer the Atari 2600 video game console to produce its own cartridges. The company was able to obtain the license for Star Wars games from Lucasfilm. Parker Brothers earned $74 million from cartridge sales between June and December 1982. Other Parker Brothers video games included the console versions of Konami's Frogger, Nintendo's Popeye, and Gottlieb's Q*bert and Reactor.

== Some games published ==
- Aggravation
- Authors
- Bop It
- Cluedo
- Gambler
- Jack Straws
- The Mad Magazine Game
- The Mansion of Happiness
- Merlin
- Monopoly
- Ouija
- Peter, Peter, Pumpkin Eater
- Pente
- Ping Pong
- Probe
- Quicksand (1989): Each player controls one of four explorers racing to discover an ancient temple, sinking as they progress.
- Risk
- Scrabble
- All The King's Men (Note: With Milton Bradley; US and Canada only.)
- Sorry!
- Tiddledy Winks
- Touring

=== Gallery ===
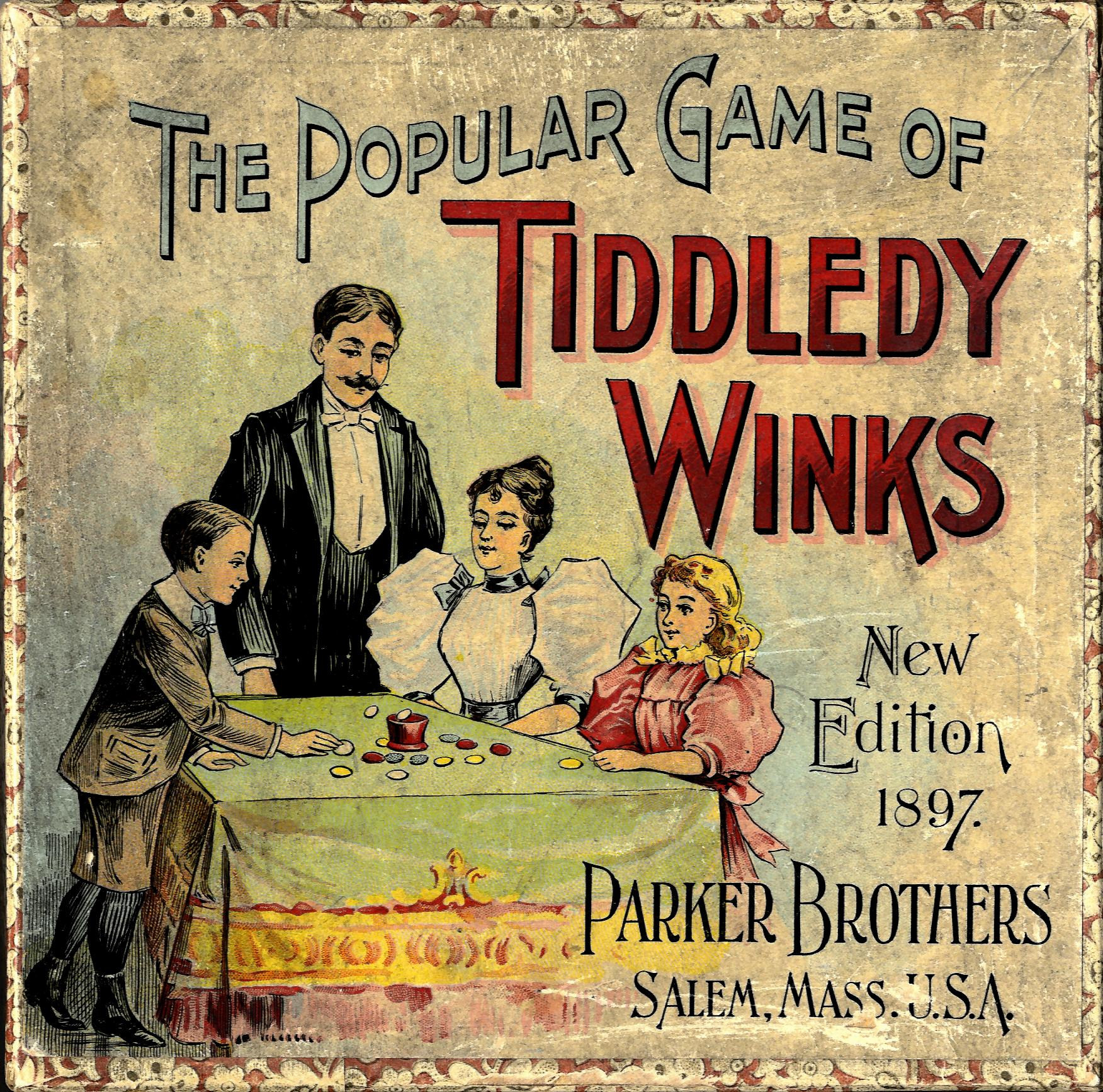
Tiddledy Winks

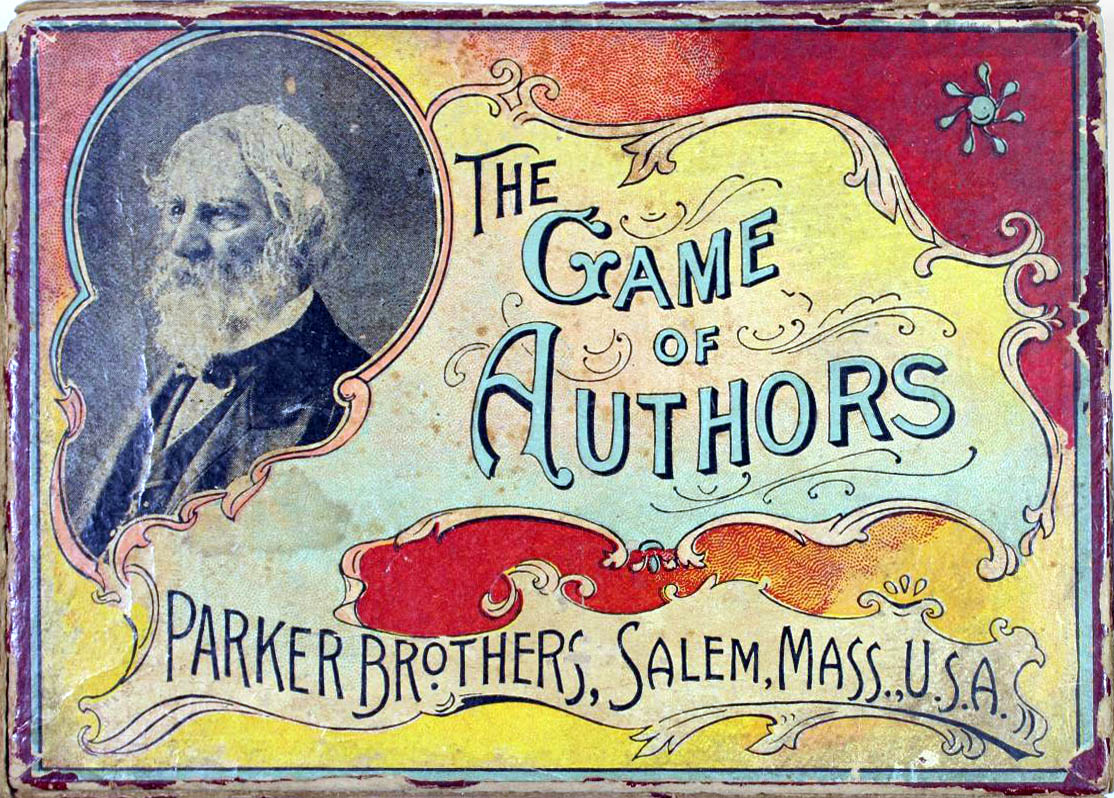
Authors

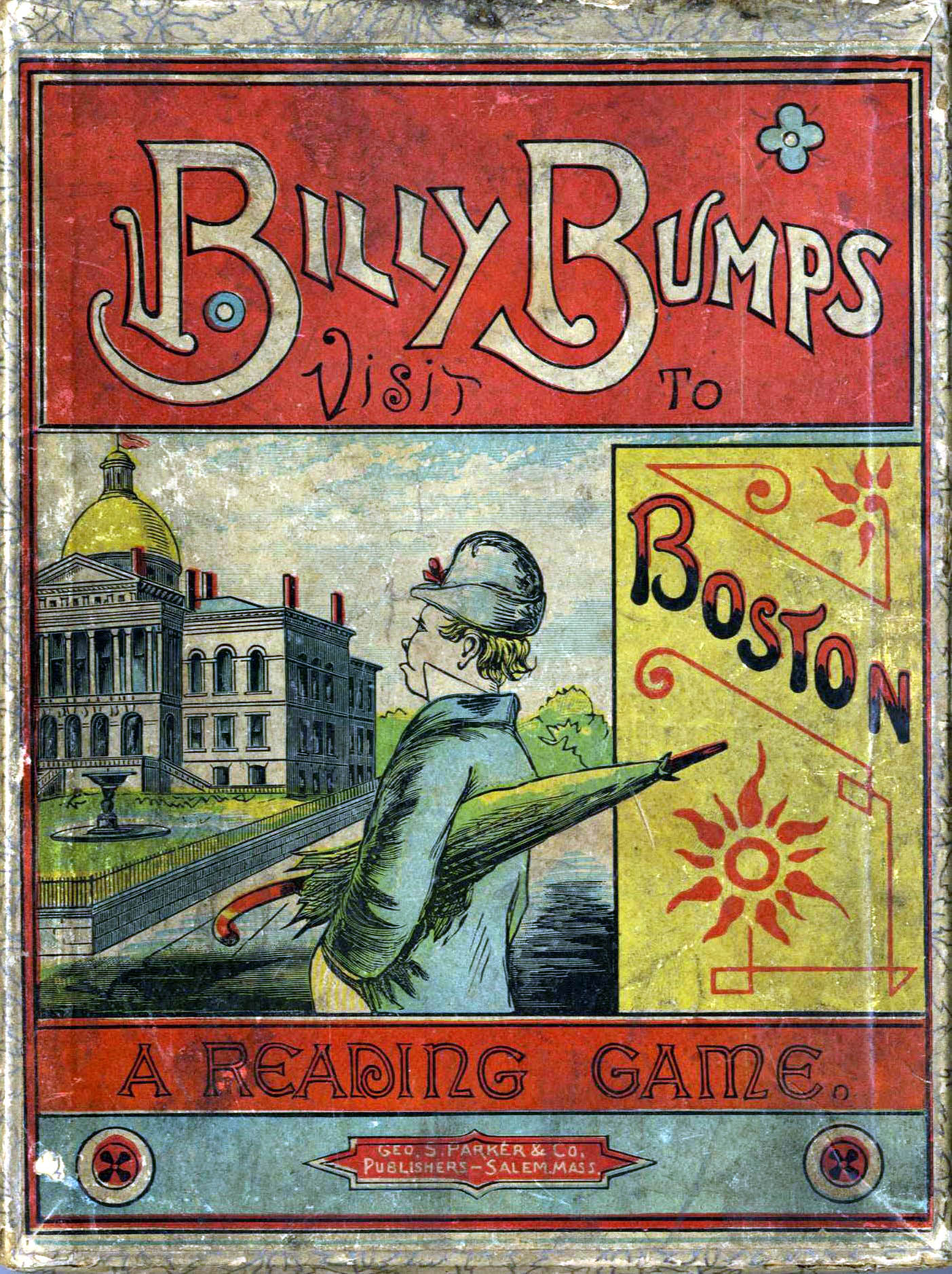
Billy Bumps Visit to Boston

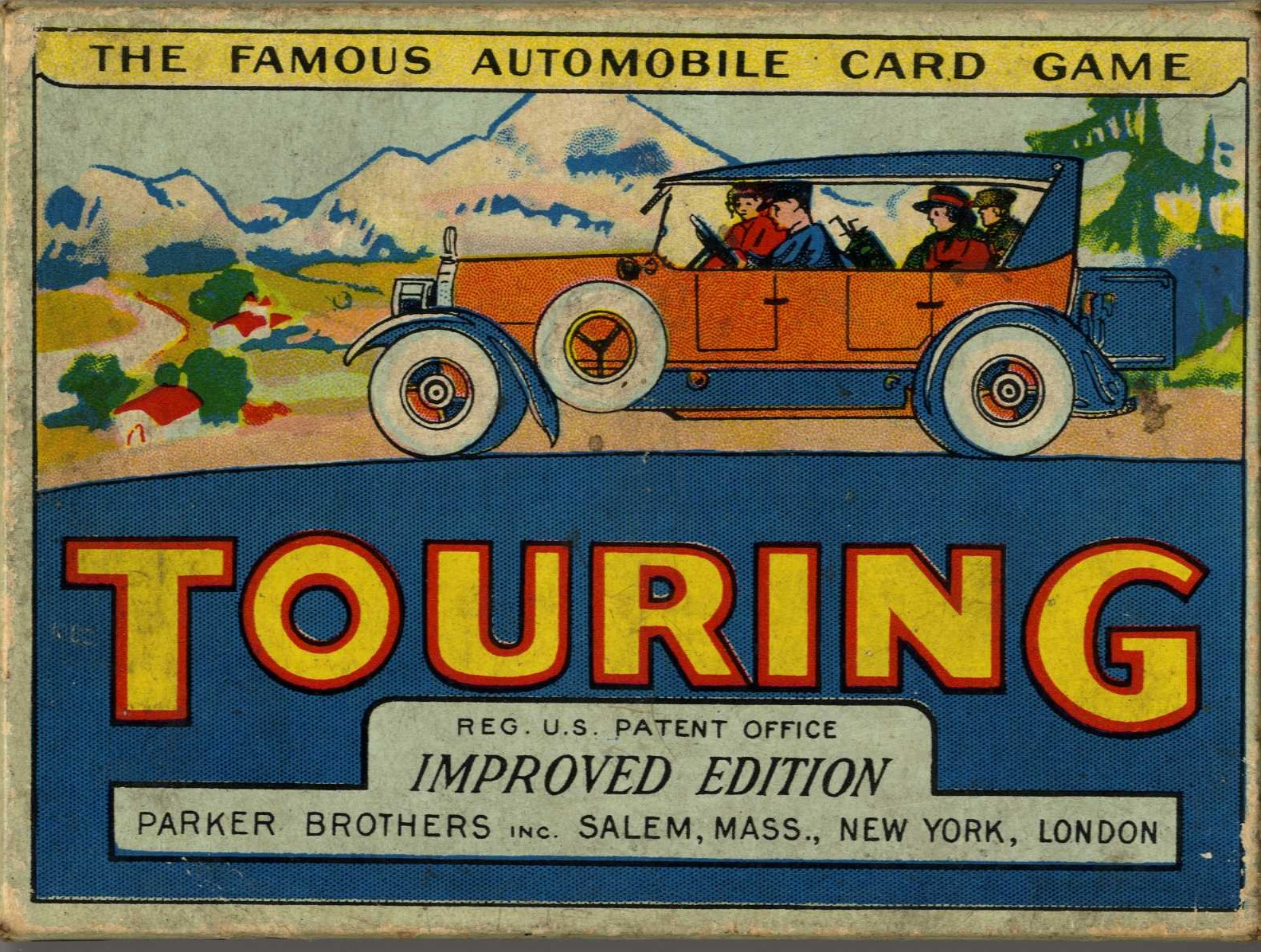
Touring

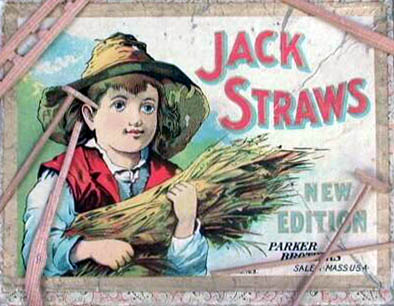
Jack Straws

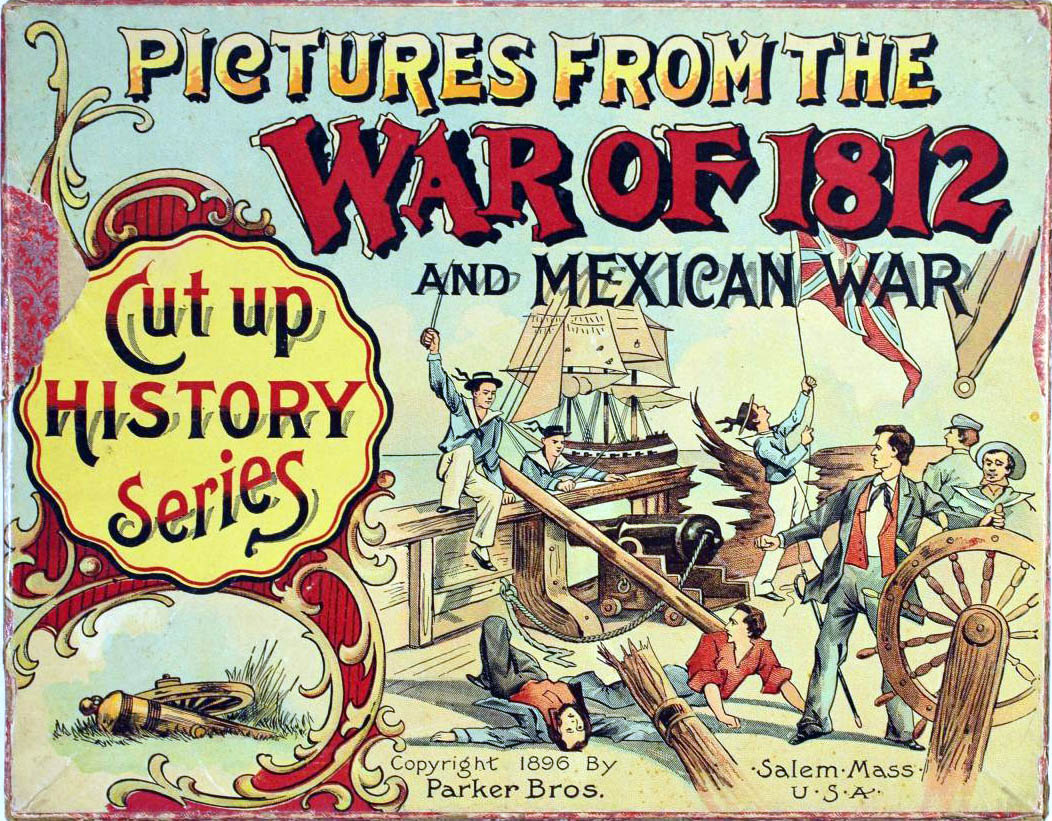
Pictures from the War of 1812

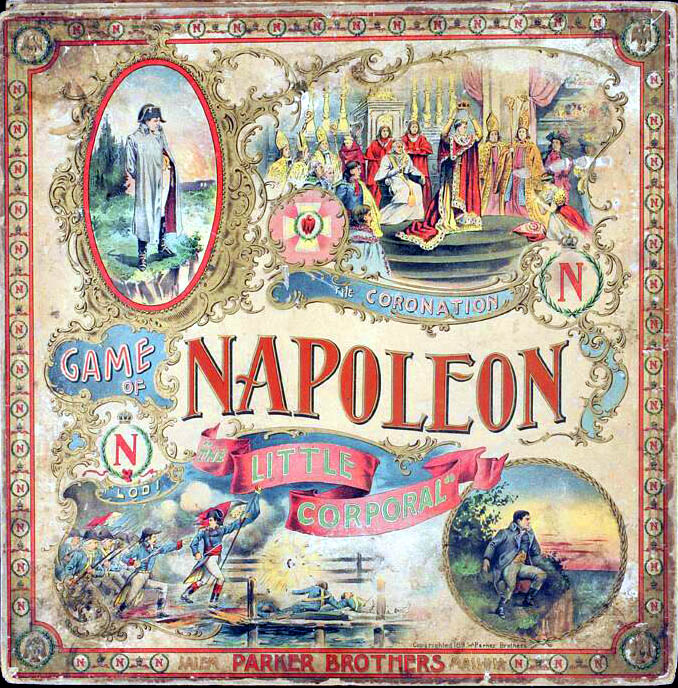
Napoleon, the Little Corporal

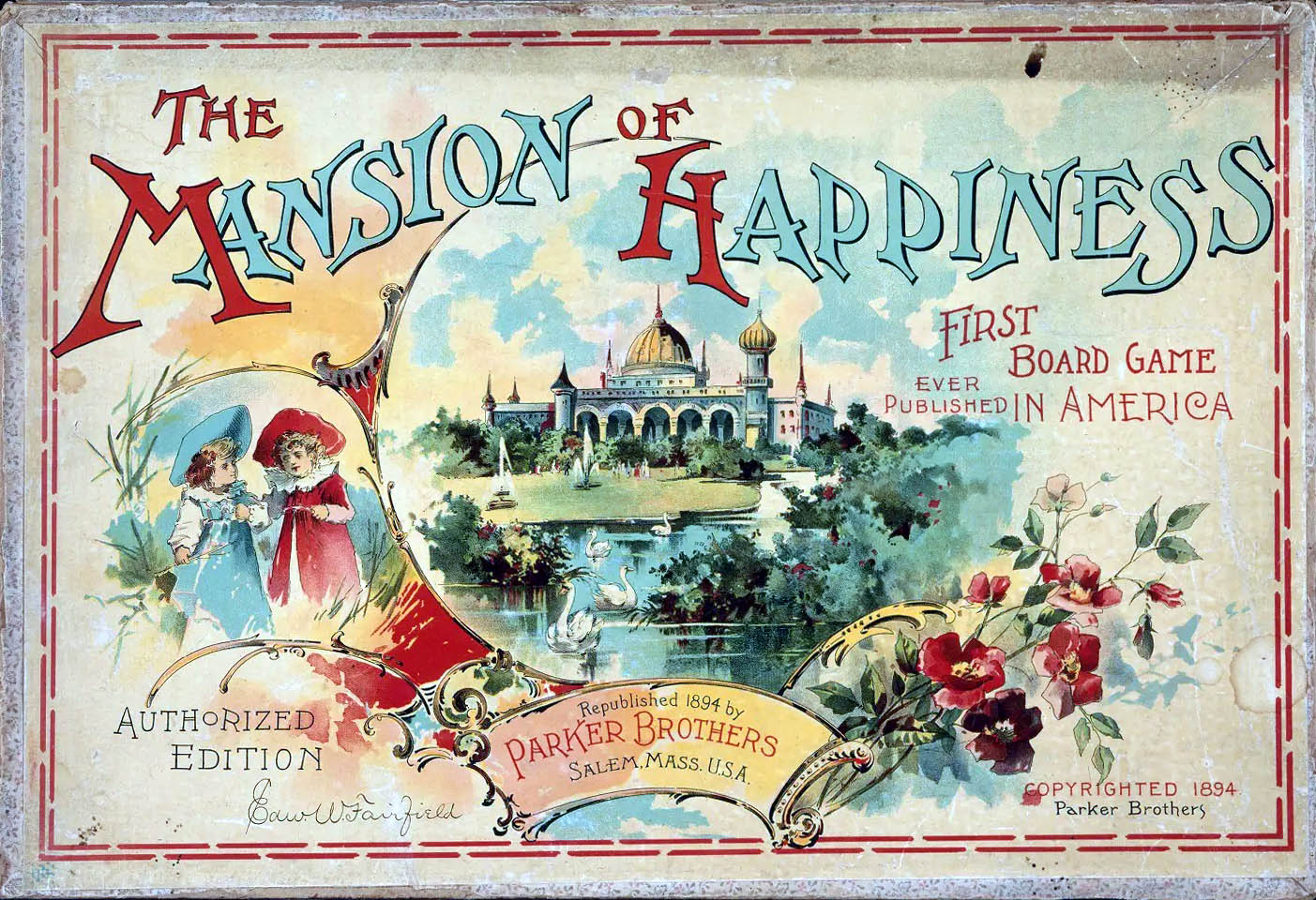
The Mansion of Happiness

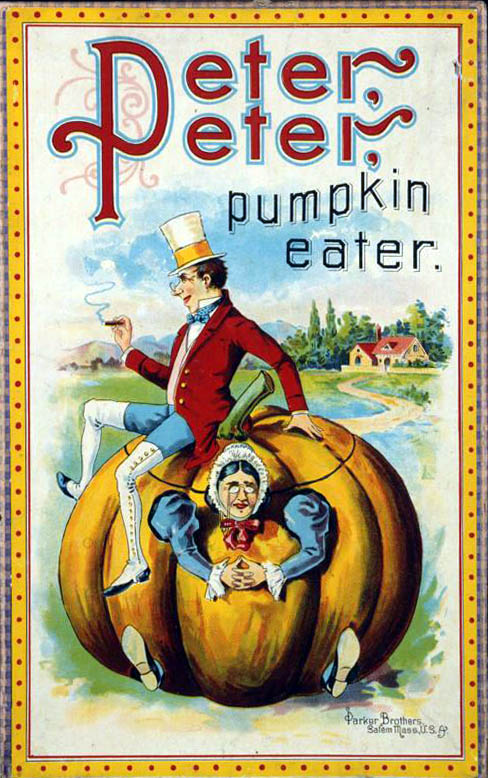
Peter Peter Pumpkin Eater

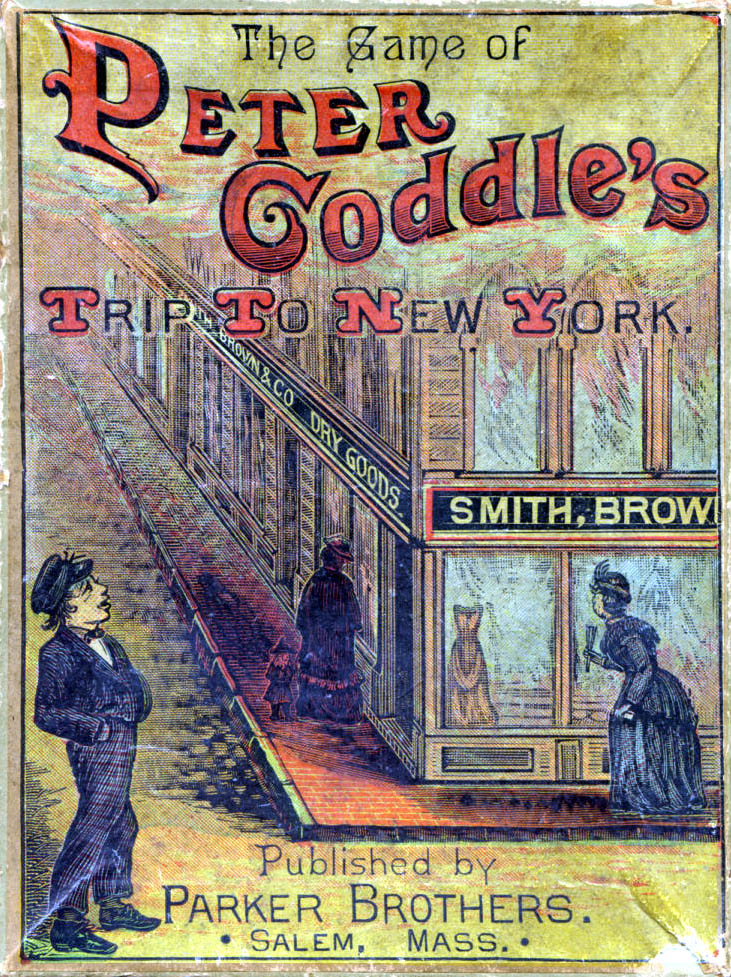
Peter Coddle's Trip to New York

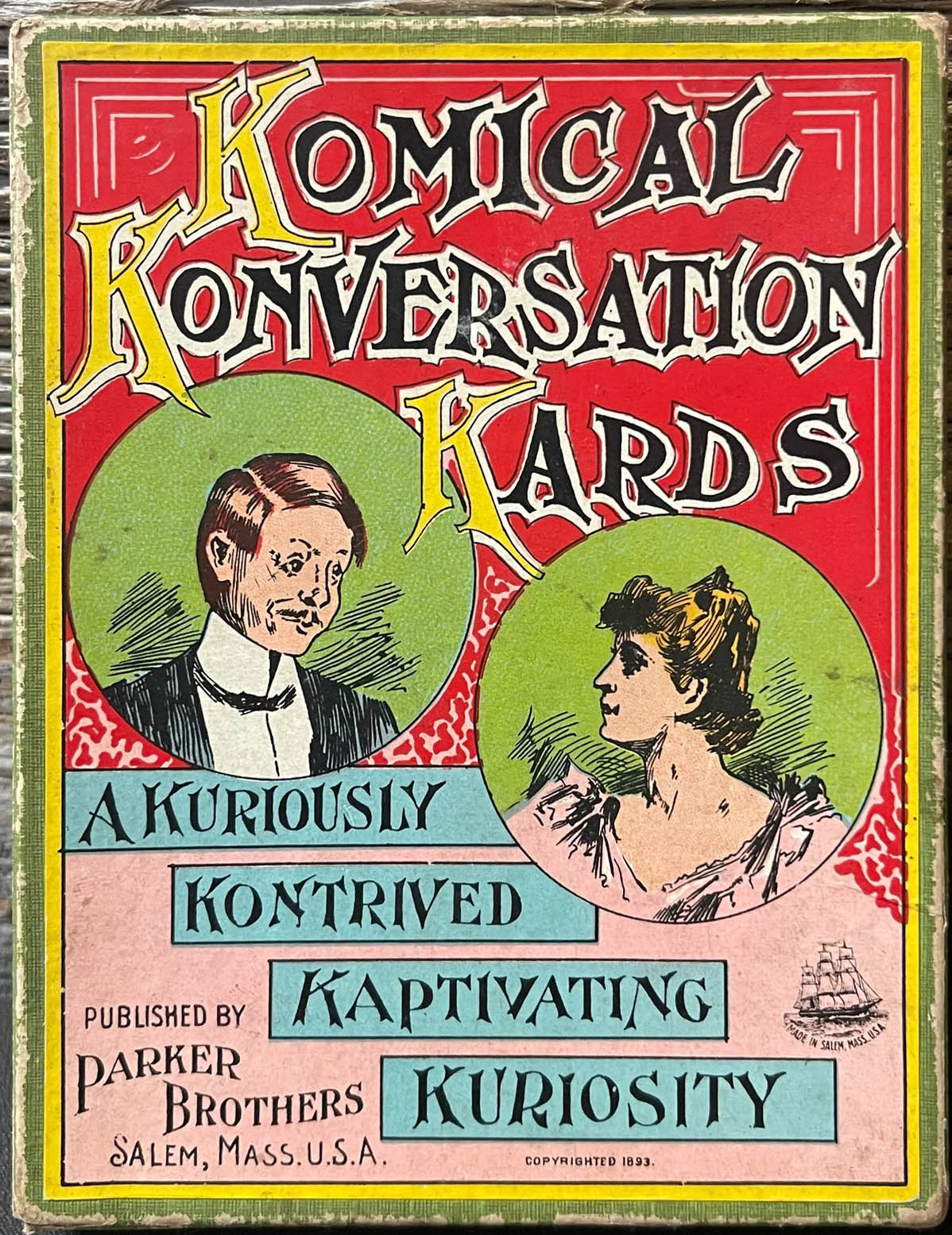
Komical Konversation Kards

== See also ==
- Milton Bradley
