= The Quest of the Philosopher's Stone =

1986 Canadian board game

The Quest of the Philosopher's Stone is a 1986 Canadian board game published by Questone Marketing Inc. The game challenges players with three difficulty levels of puzzles and is set in a medieval fantasy world that includes sites such as Camelot, Atlantis and Stonehenge.
