= Vassal (game engine) =

Java-based online game engine

Vassal Engine
- Developer: The Vassal Team.
- Release: 1996
- Stable release: 3.8.2 / November 17, 2026
- Written in: Java
- Operating system: Any
- Platform: Cross-platform
- Available in: Multilingual (English and 6 other languages)
- Type: Game engine
- License: GNU LGPLv2+
- Website: vassalengine.org
- Repository: github.com/vassalengine/vassal

The Vassal Engine is a game engine for building and playing online adaptations of board games, tabletop games and card games. It allows users to play in real time over a live Internet connection, and also by email (PbeM). It runs on all platforms, and is free, open-source software. For example, there is a Star Wars Miniatures module, where players can play with up to three others in a digital replica of the table-top game.

It is written in Java and the source code is available from GitHub under the LGPL open source license.

== History ==
Vassal began as an application for playing Advanced Squad Leader. This program was named VASL, an acronym for "Virtual Advanced Squad Leader." In 2002, this was expanded into a generic board game engine now called Vassal, with VASL being changed into just one out of many modules for Vassal.

== Available modules ==
Vassal modules exist for over 3400 games.

== Copyright and licensing ==
In September 2008, Games Workshop issued a cease-and-desist order regarding the Vassal module for Warhammer 40K to Tim Davis, its maintainer at that time. The module is still played.

Games Workshop has also issued a cease-and-desist order regarding Space Hulk.

== Similar projects ==
Similar engines for making board games include ZunTzu and Boardgame.io.
