= 2008 in games =

This page lists board and card games, wargames, miniatures games, and tabletop role-playing games published in 2008. For video games, see 2008 in video gaming.

== Games released or invented in 2008 ==
- Android
- Arkham Horror: Kingsport Horror (expansion)
- Arkham Horror: The Black Goat of the Woods (expansion)
- Axis & Allies Anniversary Edition
- Bailout! The Game
- Battlestar Galactica: The Board Game
- The Big Taboo
- Bonehead
- Bushido
- Carcassonne: Catapult
- Carcassonne: Count, King, and Cult
- Carcassonne: The Cult
- Carcassonne: Cult, Siege and Creativity
- Catan: Traders & Barbarians
- Chandragupta
- CirKis
- Cluedo: Discover the Secrets
- Conflict of Heroes: Awakening the Bear!
- Dixit
- Dōbutsu shōgi
- Don't Drop the Soap
- Dark Heresy (Warhammer 40,000 Roleplay)
- Dominion
- Eye Know
- Fields of Fire
- Flibbix
- Fluxx 4.0
- Hooop!
- Kamisado
- Keltis
- Killer Bunnies and the Journey to Jupiter
- Le Havre
- Lost Cities: The Board Game
- Monty Python Fluxx
- Munchkin Cthulhu 3 - The Unspeakable Vault
- Munchkin 6: Demented Dungeons
- Munchkin 7: More Good Cards
- New World: A Carcassonne Game
- Pack & Stack
- Palago
- Panzer Grenadier: Cassino '44, Gateway to Rome
- Panzer Grenadier: Elsenborn Ridge
- Playing Gods
- Pyramid Power
- Race for the Galaxy: The Gathering Storm
- Realm of the Desert Sons
- Scrabble ME
- Say Anything
- Set Cubed
- Sexy Slang
- Space Alert
- Stone Age
- Tide of Iron: Days of the Fox
- Tide of Iron: Designer Series Vol. 1
- Tide of Iron: Normandy
- A Touch of Evil: The Supernatural Game
- Trail of Cthulhu
- Ultimate Werewolf
- Vineta
- Zombies!!! 7: Send in the Clowns

== Game awards given in 2008 ==
- Spiel des Jahres: Keltis
- Spiel des Jahres special prize for Best complex game: Agricola
- Kinderspiel des Jahres: Wer war’s?
- Mensa Select: AmuseAmaze, Eye Know, Jumbulaya, Pixel, Tiki Topple
- Games: Tzaar
- Agricola won the Spiel Portugal Jogo do Ano.

== Significant game-related events in 2008 ==
- Cranium, Inc. was purchased by Hasbro for US$77.5 million.

== Deaths ==
Date	Name	Age	Notability
March 4	Gary Gygax	69	co-creator of Dungeons & Dragons
March 7	David Gale	86	Mathematician who designed Bridg-It
April 19	Bob Bledsaw	65	RPG designer, co-founder of Judges Guild
June 7	Erick Wujcik	57	RPG designer, co-founder of Palladium Books
July 23	N. Robin Crossby	54	RPG designer, creator of the Hârn setting
September 21	Brian Thomsen	49	Novelist, including Forgotten Realms

== See also ==
- List of game manufacturers
- 2008 in video gaming
- 2008 in chess
- 2008 in darts
