= 2002 in games =

This page lists board and card games, wargames, miniatures games, and tabletop role-playing games published in 2002. For video games, see 2002 in video gaming.

== Games released or invented in 2002 ==
- 1313 Dead End Drive
- 30 Seconds
- A Game of Thrones collectible card game
- Age of Steam
- Apples to Apples - Expansion Set #4
- Apples to Apples Junior
- Arimaa
- BattleDragons (role-playing game)
- Brain Chain
- The Burning Wheel (role-playing game)
- Car Wars (5th Edition)
- Carcassonne - Hunters and Gatherers
- Carcassonne - Inns and Cathedrals
- Cartoon Action Hour (role-playing game)
- Chez Greek
- Children of the Sun (role-playing game)
- Clans
- d20 Modern (role-playing game)
- Deadlands: Lost Colony
- Demon: The Fallen (role-playing game)
- Diceland (tile game)
- Diceland - Deep White Sea
- Donjon (role-playing game)
- DragonStrike
- Dread: The First Book of Pandemonium
- Dungeons & Dragons: The Fantasy Adventure Board Game
- Dust Devils (role-playing game)
- Engel (role-playing game)
- EverQuest Role-Playing Game
- Fairy Meat - Wicked Things
- Farscape Roleplaying Game
- Fightball
- Flames of War (first edition)
- Frag Fire Zone
- Frag PVP
- Freeloader
- The Game of Life Card Game
- A Game of Thrones
- Give Me the Brain (full color "Special Edition")
- Godlike (role-playing game)
- Great War at Sea: Great White Fleet
- Great War at Sea: U.S. Navy Plan Red
- Hammer of the Scots
- HeroClix
- Hundred Kingdoms
- I Ain't Been Shot, Mum!
- InSpectres (role-playing game)
- Jadeclaw (role-playing game)
- The Judge Dredd Role-playing Game
- Killer Bunnies and the Quest for the Magic Carrot
- Lord of the Rings Roleplaying Game
- Lord of the Rings - Sauron
- MechWarrior: Dark Age
- Mexica
- Munchkin 2: Unnatural Axe
- Mutants & Masterminds (role-playing game)
- Nanofictionary
- NBA Showdown
- Night Wizard! (role-playing game)
- Paladin (role-playing game)
- Panzer Grenadier: Afrika Korps - The Desert War
- Panzer Grenadier: Arctic Front
- Panzer Grenadier: Battle of the Bulge
- Pirate's Cove
- Puerto Rico
- The Riddle of Steel (role-playing game)
- RollerCoaster Tycoon
- Rome at War II: Fading Legions
- Save Doctor Lucky on Moon Base Copernicus
- The Settlers of Canaan
- The Settlers of the Stone Age
- Silver Age Sentinels (role-playing game)
- Sorcerer (role-playing game)
- Spaceship Zero (role-playing game)
- Star Hero (role-playing game)
- Star Munchkin (role-playing game)
- Star Trek Roleplaying Game (Decipher, Inc. version)
- Star Wars Trading Card Game
- Terra Primate (role-playing game)
- Transhuman Space (role-playing game)
- Trias
- Trollbabe (role-playing game)
- Universalis (role-playing game)
- Wallenstein
- Xactika
- Yu-Gi-Oh! Trading Card Game (English version)
- Zombies!!! 2: Zombie Corps(e)

== Game awards given in 2002 ==
- Spiel des Jahres: Villa Paletti
- Games: DVONN

== Significant game-related events of 2002 ==
- Paizo Publishing was founded by Lisa Stevens, Vic Wertz, and Johnny Wilson.

== Deaths ==
| Date | Name | Age | Notability |
|---|---|---|---|
| Unknown | Robert Charles Bell | 87-88 | Author about games |
| July 29 | Ron Walotsky | 58 | Artist for Magic: The Gathering |
| September 17 | Denys Fisher | 84 | Board game designer |
| November 6 | Sid Sackson | 82 | prolific games designer |
| December 25 | Russ Berrie | 69 | Founder of toy and game company Russ Berrie and Company |

== See also ==
- 2002 in video gaming
