= Five Crowns (card game) =

Five-suited rummy-style card game

The Five-Suited Rummy-Style Card Game
- Publishers: Set Enterprises
- Publication: 1996
- Genres: Card Game
- Players: 1-7
- Setup time: <1 Minute
- Playing time: 45 Minutes
- Chance: Medium
- Age range: 8+
- Skills: Strategy

Five Crowns is a card game created by Set Enterprises. Players compete by trying to obtain the lowest number of points after playing all eleven hands of the game and making sets of "books and runs". The game ends when the eleventh round has concluded. Thus the slogan of Five Crowns states: "The Game Isn't Over 'Til the Kings Go Wild!" The game combines aspects of Rummy and Phase 10.

== Play and scoring ==
=== Game play ===
Before play starts, in every round, all the cards are shuffled. A game of Five Crowns consists of eleven rounds; the first round has a three-card hand, the second round has a four-card hand, and so on until the eleventh round when everyone plays with thirteen cards each.

In the first round, the dealer deals out three cards to each player. The remaining cards form a draw pile. The top card is turned over to start a discard pile. The player to the dealer's left goes first. The player may choose the top card from either the draw pile (card is face down) or the discard pile (card is face up). The player adds this card to their hand. The player ends their turn by discarding one card from their hand so that the player ends up with the same number of cards as were dealt (in this case, three cards were dealt).

A player can go out if the cards in their hand can form a set or multiple sets of books or runs. See "Books and Runs" below for an in-depth definition and examples for both. After the player has completed the set(s) of books or runs, they may lay down their cards face up so that all players may see the completed sequence(s). After this move, all players get one more turn to try to complete their books or runs. Players now count up all their excess points that fail to fall into their books or runs. All players that could go out in the last turn (including the player who went out first), take 0 points against them. All points that players receive count against that player. At the end of all eleven rounds, the player with the least amount of points wins the game, in case of a tie, tied players share the victory.

== Card values and wilds ==
Each number card is worth its face value. e.g., the card "4" is worth 4 points. The Jacks are worth 11 points, Queens are worth 12 points, Kings are worth 13 points, Jokers are worth 50 points, and the current temporary wild card is 20 points. The wild card changes from hand to hand depending on which round it is. For a round with three cards dealt to each player, the number three card is wild. When four cards are dealt to each player, fours are wild. The game progresses until the last hand when the Kings are wild. (In that hand, people are dealt thirteen cards a piece) Jokers are always wild no matter which round it is.

== Books and Runs ==
=== Books ===
A book consists of three or more cards of the same value regardless of suit. e.g., 10★ 10★ 10♣ 10♦. Any card in a book can be replaced by the wild card of the round or a Joker. If nines are wild for this round, the books could consist of the following: 5♦ 5★ 9♥ 5♣. You may have as many temporary wild cards or Jokers as you wish, and they may be adjacent to each other.

=== Runs ===
A run consists of a sequence (meaning the cards are in value order) of three or more cards of the same suit. e.g., 4♥ 5♥ 6♥ 7♥ 8♥, or 10♣ J♣ Q♣ K♣. Any card in a run can be replaced by the wild card of the round or a Joker. e.g., if tens are wild, your run could consist of the following: 3★ 4★ 10♠ 6★. You may have as many wild cards or Jokers as you wish (and they may be adjacent to each other).

== Deck ==
The game consists of two 58-card decks (116 cards in all). Each deck contains five suits: stars (★), hearts (♥), spades, (♠) clubs (♣), and diamonds (♦). Each suit has eleven cards: 3, 4, 5, 6, 7, 8, 9, 10, a Jack, Queen, and King. The game contains six Jokers.

Round Number	Cards Dealt to Each Player	Wild Card Number
1	3	3
2	4	4
3	5	5
4	6	6
5	7	7
6	8	8
7	9	9
8	10	10
9	11	Jack
10	12	Queen
11	13	King

Note: Jokers are always wild.

== Five Crowns solitaire instructions ==
In Five Crowns Solitaire Edition, use your regular deck of Five Crowns cards and play a solo version.

=== Setup (solitaire version) ===
Deal out 11 piles with 3 cards in the first pile, 4 in the second, 5 in the third, etc. with the eleventh pile containing 13 cards. Each pile represents a hand in the regular game of Five Crowns. Lay out all the piles of cards face up so you can easily view every card. The first pile is the 3-card hand, in which 3s are wild; the second is the 4-card hand, in which 4s are wild, etc. Jokers are always wild. You may not move cards between hands. From the remaining cards in the deck, form a draw pile and turn the top card face up to reveal a discard pile.

=== Game play (solitaire version) ===
When play begins, you may choose the face-up card in the discard pile or the face-down card on top of the draw pile. Looking at all the hands, play the card in whichever hand you feel will benefit most, and discard one card from that hand. The hand should have the amount of cards that it was dealt at the beginning of the game. From this point on, no card in the discard pile may be used again in play. When a hand is able to go out, (according to the normal Five Crowns rules) turn it over and you are finished with that hand. You do not have to complete hands in order of regular Five Crowns. i.e., 3-card hand first, 4-card hand second, 5-card hand third, etc. When a hand is completed, do not shuffle it back into the draw deck. Continue to draw cards from the deck, until either all hands have been turned over (you win), or the stack is depleted before you close all the hands (you lose).

== Other Five Crowns variants ==
- Five Crowns Solitaire Version
- Five Crowns Junior
- Five Crowns Mini Round Card Game

== Reception ==
Janet Simons for the Rocky Mountain News said "Advantages: If you enjoy rummy, you can enjoy it with as many as seven players. Disadvantages: It's still rummy."

David Holmstrom for The Christian Science Monitor described Five Crowns as "A fast-paced card game with a wild card that changes with every hand. Just when it looks like a player will lose, the last hand can turn her into a winner."

Linda Cobb for Bristol Herald Courier said "The problem is that the decks do not have aces or deuces. That doesn't sound practical for poker, but if you want to give it a try, Five Crowns is made by Set Enterprises."

Joy Tipping for The Dallas Morning News said "This is a great family card game, a bit like rummy, in which kids can compete with adults and have a chance of winning, even if the adults aren't "helping" them. It's simple enough for younger kids, but also plenty challenging to keep teens and adults interested. A worthy opponent can come from behind and win even during the last hand."

Jackie Burrell for Mercury News said "Out of all the games we played last week — and we played a LOT — this award-winning five-suited riff on the rummy is our hands-down favorite. It's not new by any means, just new to us, and we have since made up for lost time. Like gin rummy, the goal is to collect sets of cards and fling down a final discard before your partner does. Unlike traditional rummy, this game uses a double deck with a fifth suit: stars. There are no aces or twos. The ethnically diverse royals are a handsome bunch. And there are wild cards out the wazoo."

== See also ==
- SET
- Set Cubed
- Quiddler
- Xactika
