= Oddball =

Oddball, Oddballs, or Odd Ball may refer to:

- Odd Ball (comic strip), a British comic strip
- Oddball (dragline excavator), a dragline excavator in St Aidan's, West Yorkshire, England
- Oddball (film), a 2015 Australian film
- Oddball, a segment on the MSNBC show Countdown with Keith Olbermann
- Oddball, a type of trivia question featured in the boardgame Brain Chain
- OddBallers, a 2023 dodgeball video game by Ubisoft

== Fictional characters ==
- Oddball (character), Marvel supervillain
- Oddball (102 Dalmatians), a spotless dalmatian puppy in the film 102 Dalmatians
- Oddball, eccentric tank commander played by Donald Sutherland in the film Kelly's Heroes

== See also ==
- Oddballs (disambiguation), more topics referred to by the same name
- Oddball paradigm, a neuroscientific experimental design paradigm
- Unidentified Flying Oddball, 1979 film adaptation of A Connecticut Yankee in King Arthur's Court
