= Roominate =

Construction set by Maykah Inc.

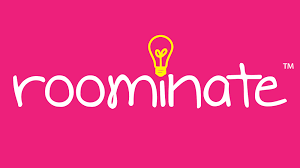
- Industry: Toys
- Headquarters: Sunnyvale, California

Roominate is a construction set introduced by Maykah Inc., a company founded by Alice Brooks and Bettina Chen, in 2012. The product, marketed at girls aged 6–11, consists of modular plastic building pieces that can interlock to create models and includes circuits that can be wired. Originally funded through Kickstarter, the company received an investment from Mark Cuban and Lori Greiner during the sixth season of Shark Tank. In 2016, Roominate was acquired by toy manufacturer PlayMonster.

== History ==
Alice Brooks and Bettina Chen, the founders of Maykah, Inc., met in the master's degree engineering program at Stanford University. The two launched their first prototype on Kickstarter and raised US$85,000 from a US$25,000 funding goal. The team participated in StartX, a business incubator for Stanford entrepreneurs, in 2012, and partnered with EdForward, the Center for Innovation in Education at the UC Davis School of Education, to create a series of educational activity guides to accompany the kits.

Roominate appeared on the Season 6 premiere episode of Shark Tank, where they received a US$500,000 investment from Mark Cuban and Lori Greiner for a 5% equity share.

== Products ==
Roominate offers nine products that contain different quantities and combinations of the modular building pieces and circuitry. Tekla Perry, in an article for the Institute of Electrical and Electronics Engineers, described Roominate as a "STEM" (science, technology, engineering, and mathematics) toy company.
