= Bushido (disambiguation) =

Bushido or Bushidō represented regulations for samurai attitudes and behavior of feudal Japan.

Bushido may also refer to:

== Games ==
- Bushido (board game), a German board game where players compete for honor to become the next Emperor of Japan
- Bushido (role-playing game), a role-playing game from the late 20th century

== Fictional characters ==
- Bushido (character), a DC Comics character
- Bushido (G.I. Joe), a fictional character in the G.I. Joe universe
- Mr. Bushido, a character in the anime series Mobile Suit Gundam 00
- Kenji Bushido, a foe in the racing game Need for Speed: Carbon
- Roronoa Zoro, a character from One Piece who has been nicknamed "Mr. Bushido"

== Other uses ==
- Bushido (rapper) (born 1978), a German rapper
- Bushido, Samurai Saga, a 1963 Japanese film
- Bushido: The Soul of Japan, an 1899 book
- "Bushido", a single on the album (r)Evolution by HammerFall
- Bushido, the trade name of Pride Fighting Championships lightweight and welterweight mixed martial arts events
