= Frag =

Frag or Fragging may refer to:

== Military ==
- Fragging, deliberate killing of a member of one's own fighting unit, historically using a fragmentation grenade
- Fragmentation grenade, or 'frag', in military, a type of hand grenade
  - Any similar weapons based on the fragmentation effect
- Air Tasking Order, historically 'fragmentary order', now informally 'frag'

== Arts, entertainment, and media ==
- Frag, a DC Comics character, and member of The Blasters
- Frag (game), a board game published by Steve Jackson Games, inspired by fragging in video games
- Frag (video gaming), in deathmatch computer games, means to kill, originated from the military term

== Science and technology ==
- Fragmentation (computing), or "fragging", a phenomenon during which storage space is used inefficiently in computer storage
- Fragmentation (reproduction), or "fragging", a form of asexual propagation in aquariums with coral
