= Eye Know (game) =

Board game

- Designers: Paul Berton and George Sinclair
- Publishers: Wiggles 3D
- Players: 2 or more players or teams
- Setup time: 5 minutes
- Playing time: 30–60 min
- Chance: None
- Age range: 14 and up
- Skills: general knowledge

Eye Know is a board game that includes images, trivia and betting. It was created by Paul Berton and George Sinclair and published in 2008 by Wiggles 3D.

Paul Berton is the son of Canadian historian Pierre Berton. He was at the time the editor-in-chief of The London Free Press, and is now editor-in-chief of The Hamilton Spectator. George Sinclair is a technical writer.

== Gameplay ==
One distinctive feature of this game is that it combines trivia with identifying images and betting. Another is that players select the topics of their trivia questions.

Players try to identify images on cards on the board. Once a player has identified an image, they are asked a trivia question related to the image. The player selects the level of difficulty of their question and decides how many chips to bet on whether they know the answer. Different question levels pay out different amounts: true/false questions pay 1:1, multiple-choice questions pay 2:1 and open-ended questions pay 3:1.

== Awards ==
American Mensa chose Eye Know as a winner of the Mensa Select award in 2008.
