= Xactika =

Card game

- An Xactika card
- Type: Trick-taking
- Players: 2-10
- Age range: 12+
- Cards: 81
- Playing time: 30-45 minutes

Xactika is a card game for two to ten players designed by Marsha Falco and published by Set Enterprises in 2002. It is a trick-taking game that is played with a dedicated deck of 81 cards. The object of the game is to obtain the greatest number of points after eight rounds of play. Points are awarded by taking the exact number of tricks that one bids before each round.

== Deck ==
The card deck consists of cards with face values ranging from 4 to 12, each with different combinations of four different suits: balls, cubes, cones and stars. A card can have from one to three of each of the suits, the sum of all of the shapes equaling the face value of the card. For example, a card with a face value of 9 could have 1 ball, 3 cubes, 3 cones, and 2 stars, as 1+3+3+2=9. Alternatively, a card with a face value of 9 could also have 2 balls, 2 cubes, 2 cones, and 3 stars (or any other combination of suits that sums 9).

=== Card distribution ===
The deck is not composed of an even distribution of face-values. For example, there is only one card in the deck with face-value of four, and likewise for face-value of 12. The most common face-value in the deck is eight (19 of the 81 cards have a face-value of eight). The following table outlines how many cards for each suit exist in the deck.

Face value	# of cards	1 suit	2 suit	3 suit
4	1	1	0	0
5	4	3	1	0
6	10	6	3	1
7	16	7	6	3
8	19	6	7	6
9	16	3	6	7
10	10	1	3	6
11	4	0	1	3
12	1	0	0	1

Using this table, it is simple to see which cards are the most powerful. For example, for each suit, there exists only one card with a face value of ten that has a suit of one-unit (i.e. there is only one card in the deck with a face value of ten that has one cube on it). So if a player is dealt this particular card, they can be guaranteed to win a trick if they get the opportunity to lead and chose "one cube" as the suit.

== Play ==
Play begins with the deck being shuffled and the dealer dealing eight cards to each player. Eight rounds of eight tricks are played to constitute a complete game. A round consists of the deal, bidding, eight tricks, and scoring.

=== Bidding ===
Each player, starting with the player to the left of the dealer, places a bid by declaring how many tricks they will take during the hand. Bids can be any number from zero (i.e. the player believes that they will win no tricks during the round) to eight (i.e. the player believes that they will win every trick during the round). Bidding continues clockwise around the table and the dealer bids last, and the dealer must bid a number that does not bring the total number of tricks bid to eight. (For example, in a three-player game, if the first player bids five and the second player bids one, the dealer can bid anything except two, as this would bring the total number of bids to eight.) This forces at least one player to miss their bid each round.

=== Leading ===
Play continues with the player to the left of the dealer who leads first. This player plays a card from their hand and calls one of the four suit combinations on it (for example: three cubes). Going clockwise around the table, each player must play a card with the same suit combination (three cubes) if they have it (if not, they can play any card). The card with the highest face value that has the same suit combination wins the trick, and the player who wins the trick leads the next round. In the case of a tie, the last player to play a card wins the trick.

=== Scoring ===
After eight tricks, the round is complete and scores are tallied. Players who take exactly the number of tricks that they bid get a point for each trick taken (i.e. a player who bids three and wins exactly three tricks receives three points). Those players who miss their bid receive -1 point for each trick off their bid (i.e. a player who bids three and wins 5 tricks receives -2 points).

=== Winning ===
After eight rounds, the player with the highest score wins.

== Strategies ==
- Knowing the card distribution is key to recognizing the strength of one's hand and placing bids, as well as knowing which suit to call if one wishes to win (or lose) a trick. A card's most powerful suit is that suit which is the "smallest" - for example, a card with face-value nine that has one ball, two cubes, three cones and three stars is more often to win a trick if the ball suit is called, as there are only four cards in the entire deck that have a value greater than or equal to nine with one ball. Conversely, calling the cone suit is likely to have the trick won by another player, as there are 17 cards in the deck with a face-value of nine or greater that have three cones.
- The rule of thumb is to bid one trick for every 12 or 11, and one trick for every two tens and nines in one's hand.

== Educational value ==
Xactika is a card game that challenges and builds students' ability to estimate the outcome of a series of processes. They must evaluate the probability of being in a position to take other players’ cards that are laid down each round, based on the cards they have in their hand. There is no drawing or discarding. Xactika sharpens their math skills and critical thinking skills. They must predict exactly (hence the name Xactika) the number of rounds in which they will be able to take the cards played. The game is designed so that as play evolves, cards that appeared weak initially may become strong as the hand evolves. Developing the ability to correctly bid their hands involves analytical reasoning, following the evolution of the play develops patterning skills. Students must recognize the value of their hand, not just from having the highest point cards in one of the four suits on each card, but also from an understanding of the chances that for some of their other cards their opponents may not have cards of similar value.

To play, students must examine their hand to find cards in specific suits that have values they think are greater than their opponents. Some cards are sure bets, but only if the player can take the lead. Others have a high probability of taking a trick, but this depends upon how the cards are played by others. So, careful attention must be paid to the moves of other players. This leads to an involvement that improves social skills. Each player must also prepare his/her hand for the end of each round, where they must be sure that they have a card that won’t take an unwanted trick. The outcome of a hand is not determined until the end of the 8 rounds, so each player’s attention is kept riveted throughout each of the eight hands that comprise the game. Critical thinking must be applied to the process of taking, as well as avoiding, tricks. Every player will have a number of ways to play each hand, but finding the critical path to making exactly the right numbers of bids is the object of the game.

There is a downloadable Xactika Graphing Page on the Set Enterprises website. It shows how to use Xactika to teach bell curves, bar graphs and pie charts.

== Reception ==
Cynthia Copeland in her book Family Fun Night: The Third Edition: 365+ Great Nights with Your Kids wrote that "The game's slogan is 'Beware the Last Card' because of the precision required as players try to predict exactly the outcome of playing eight cards. An innovative version of the popular card game Spades, Xactika is somewhat challenging to learn; there are many rules to game play, but once mastered, it's great fun. Families with kids ages 12 and up will enjoy it."

=== Awards ===
Xactika has won the following Best Game Awards:

- 2008 Creative Child’s Preferred Choice Award
- 2005 Creative Child’s Preferred Choice Award
- 2002 Games Magazine ‘Games 100’ Award
- 2002 Parents’ Choice Award
