= Oddballs =

Oddballs may refer to:

- Odd Balls, 2004 comedy album by The Bob & Tom Show
- Oddballs, 1993 collection of short stories by children's author William Sleator
- Oddballs (album), a 2000 album by Frank Black
- Oddballs (comedy troupe), a British comedy troupe
- Oddballs (film), a 1984 film
- Oddballs (TV series), a 2022 television series

== See also ==
- Oddball
