= Koosh ball =

Toy ball made of rubber filaments on a soft rubber core

Koosh
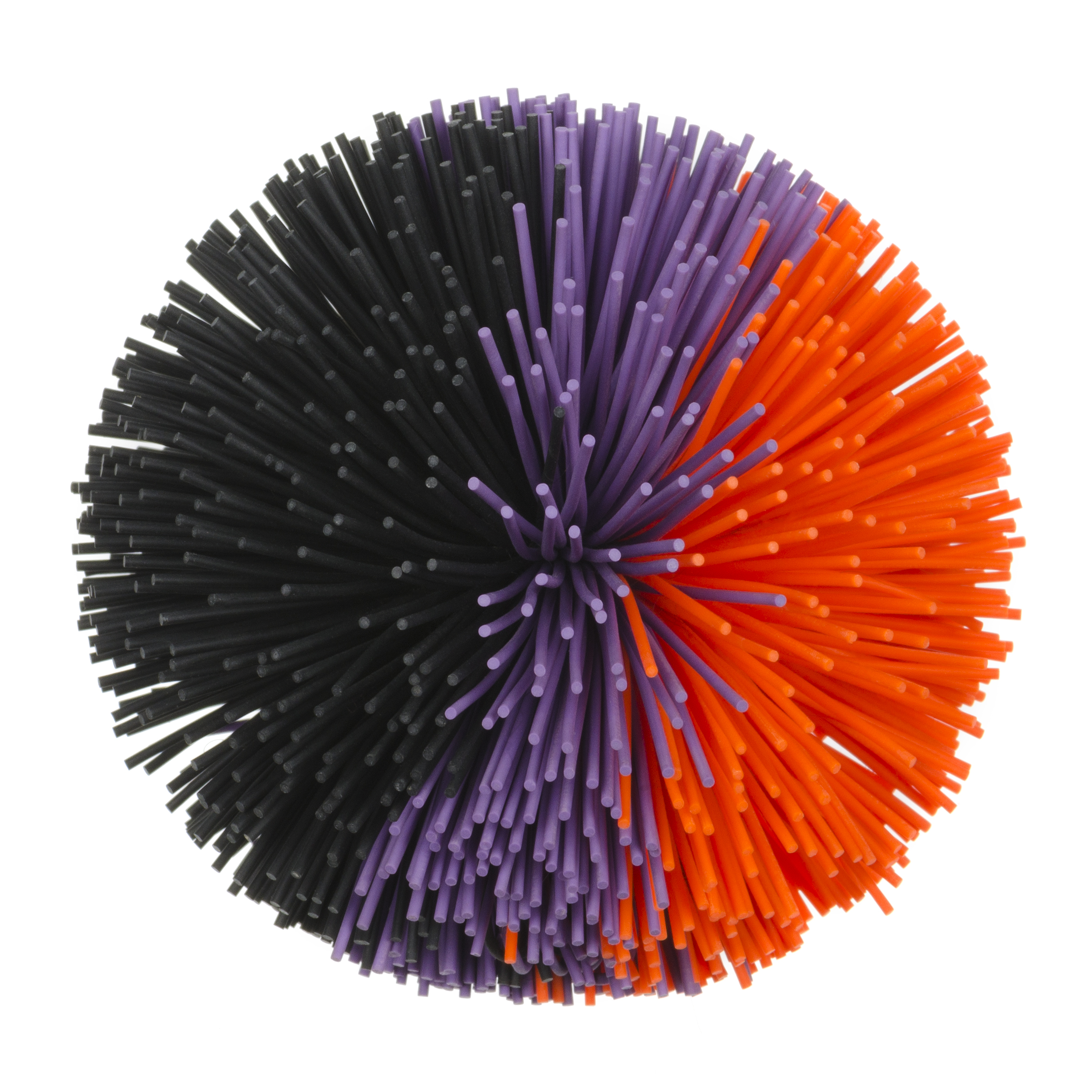
- Type: Rubber balls
- Company: OddzOn Products Inc.; Hasbro
- Country: United States
- Availability: 1989–present
- Materials: Rubber, foam, plastic

The Koosh ball is a toy ball made of rubber filaments (strands) radiating from a steel-bound core, patented in 1987 by Scott H. Stillinger. Stillinger named the toy "Koosh" after the sound it made when it landed in his hand. The company later expanded its product line to include 50 other Koosh-related products, including keyrings, baseball sets, and yo-yos.

The ball consists of about 2,000 natural rubber filaments, and has been released in a variety of color combinations.

As of 2020, Koosh balls are manufactured by PlayMonster in cooperation with Hasbro. They have introduced a range of new product lines, including Koosh Galaxy and Koosh Cameos.

== Koosh Kins ==
The Koosh Kins were a variation on the Koosh ball, featuring faces and hands. They were originally created as a set of six characters, then released with variant colors.

The characters were featured in a four-part comic book miniseries released by Archie Comics, as well as a series of coloring books. In that series, they lived on the planet Koosh, a large Koosh ball planetoid that, in lieu of a proper orbit, bounced against other planets to travel across the universe.

Characters include:

- T.K. – the stereotypical cool character, this toy's molded face sported perpetual sunglasses. In the comic, he often abbreviated his long strings of slang into a series of letters standing for each word. His colors were a light blue face and hands, paired with a darker blue body.
- Scopes – the only character without a humanoid face, Scopes had two periscope-style eyes, similar to cartoon depictions of a crab, rising from the top of the Koosh ball. In the comics, he never spoke, but featured word balloons with question marks from time to time. His eyestalks and hands were dark blue, and his ball was green.
- Grinby – all yellow (hands and faces), Grinby was the down-to-earth but physically strong character.
- Slats – was portrayed as sly. His colors were green for face and hands, and purple for his ball. He is shown in the comics as sweet on Gee Gee.
- Gee Gee – the female of the group, she featured a predictable pink hue on her ball, with darker pink hands and face. In the comics, she's displayed as sweet and long-suffering.
- Boingo – with a predilection for parties and pizza, Boingo was the stereotypical wacky member of the group, always ready to explode into feverish energy. His coloring was red.

== Bibliography ==
- "Boom time for toys predicted as the Koosh ball arrives". Textline Multiple Source Collection (1981–1984) (January 30, 1989)
- "New toys not just for kids". The Plain Dealer (September 30, 1989)
- "Novelty rubber ball rises on list of top 20 toys". Houston Chronicle (October 28, 1989)
- "What a Koosh Job. Strange ball bounces along the trend path". Los Angeles Daily News (March 1, 1993)
- "OddzOn announces Koosh Vortex line expansions". Playthings (February 1, 1994)
- "Toymaker parlays Koosh Ball into entire line of tactile toys". The Pantagragh (Bloomington, Illinois) (June 17, 1995)
- "Firm selling 'WOW!' oddball toys generates profits". Cincinnati Post (June 17, 1995)
- Adams, Katie (May 11, 2009). "Ridiculous Ideas That Made People Millions". Investopedia.com. Archived from the original on January 14, 2012.
