= Ramshead Publishing =

Game publisher

Ramshead Publishing is an American game company that produces role-playing games and game supplements.

== History ==
Mike Holmes and Ralph Mazza were members of the Gaming Outpost who were later among the founding members and prolific posters on the Forge, and worked together to develop a game using their ideas Universalis: The Game of Unlimited Stories. Holmes and Mazza published Universalis (2002) through Ramshead Publishing. Mazza had been using his initials since childhood, and based the name of this company on his initials. Mazza bought out the share of Universalis from Holmes in January 2003, so that he owned both the game and Ramshead Publishing alone. Ramshead published the Robots & Rapiers Quick Start Rules (2004) as a PDF at first, and then printed in book form at Gen Con Indy 2004. Adept Press, Burning Wheel, Driftwood Publishing, and Ramshead Publishing sponsored the Forge booth at Gen Con in 2004. Ramshead released its second complete game, Blood Red Sands (2013), first in May 2013 as a PDF to backers of its successful 2012 Kickstarter, with a print book published in early 2014.
