= Wooly Willy =

Children's toy

The original Wooly Willy was manufactured by the Smethport Specialty Company in 1955

Wooly Willy is a toy in which metal filings are moved about with a magnetic wand to add features to a cartoon face. The toy was originally manufactured in Smethport, Pennsylvania and was launched on the toy market in 1955. It remains in production as of 2025.

Similar toys were made, some by the same company like the larger version, "Dapper Dan The Magnetic Man," which sold for three times as much.

The Woolly Willy trademark is currently held by the Beloit, Wisconsin-based company PlayMonster, formerly known as Patch Products, which purchased the Smethport Specialty Company in 2008.

== Description ==
Wooly Willy is the smiling face of a man without hair, under a vacuum-formed clear plastic with a large number of magnetic shavings in it. When the attached magnetic wand moves along the plastic or the cardboard back, the black shavings follow it and this "hair" can create features like beards, mustaches, and shaggy eyebrows on the face."

== Creation ==
The brothers Donald and James Herzog developed Wooly Willy while working in the Smethport Specialty Company, their father's toy production company, in Smethport, Pennsylvania, United States. James came up with the idea as a use for the magnetic filings that resulted from creating other toys; Donald learned about vacuum-forming. "Leonard Mackowski, an artist from nearby Bradford, Pennsylvania, was recruited to create Willy’s face" and his hidden signature is still visible.

== Launch ==
Priced at US$0.29, Wooly Willy was initially unsuccessful. A buyer for G. C. Murphy dime store chain initially purchased six dozen of the toy and expected not to sell them for a year. The buyer called Herzog just two days later and ordered 12,000 for nationwide distribution. F. W. Woolworth Company also distributed the toy. More than 75 million Wooly Willies have been sold.

== Honors ==
Wooly Willy became a hit with young baby boomers, selling more than 75 million unitsand remains in production as of 2025 by the Smethport Specialty Company, which is now owned by PlayMonster. In 2003, the Toy Industry Association added Wooly Willy to its "Century of Toys List", a roll call of the most memorable and creative toys of the 20th century. In 2006, I Love Toys, the eighth in VH1's series of I Love… nostalgia shows, presented a countdown of the 100 greatest toys, chosen partially through public voting on vh1.com and also consideration of "sales, historical significance and longevity," according to VH1. Wooly Willy placed at #81.
