= Bailout! The Game =

Board game

Bailout! The Game is a board game created in 2008 by Jordy and Shari Sopourn. The Sopourns, a married couple living in South Florida, were trying to explain the Troubled Asset Relief Program (TARP)—better known as the government bailout—to their three home-schooled children. Due to the children's young age (the oldest was 10), they had trouble understanding the concept, so their parents turned it into a board game. According to Jordy, the game "took on a life of its own" and the couple decided to self-publish the game.

The tagline of the game is, "When you lose, you WIN!" Each player chooses a bank to play (examples: "Bankruptcy O’ America", "Worth Farless"), and starts with $2.5 billion. The objective of the game is to get to the end of the money trail and build the most debt. Each turn, players make an investment decision which can cause their bank to gain or lose assets based on die rolls. The game winner is the bank with the largest amount of debt, who wins the bailout. The game also includes various trivia questions. Players must identify quotes from presidents and financial institution leaders. Answering a trivia question correctly will increase the debt of bank that the player is playing for.

Bailout! debuted at the Chicago Toy and Game Fair in November 2009. The game is sold for $29.95.

Seventeen drafts of the game were created prior to the final released version.
