= Killer Bunnies and the Journey to Jupiter =

Board game

Killer Bunnies and the Journey to Jupiter (sometimes abbreviated as J2J) is a 2008 board game with a non-collectible card game element created by Jeff Bellinger as a sequel to his game, Killer Bunnies and the Quest for the Magic Carrot, and published by Playroom Entertainment.

== Gameplay ==
The primary goal of the Journey to Jupiter is for a player to keep as many of their bunnies alive while trying to eliminate the opponents' bunnies (both on the ground and in space). Players must have at least one bunny alive (in space) at the end of the game to win.

The secondary goal of the game is to explore the Solar System by launching bunnies into space in ships. Once in space, the bunnies collect Carrot markers and journey to the planet Jupiter.

A player owns any Carrot that they bring to the planet Jupiter, and at the end of the game when all Carrots have been claimed, the Magic (or winning) Carrot is revealed. The more Carrots a player owns, the better that player's chances will be of owning the Magic Carrot and winning the game.

Killer Bunnies and the Journey to Jupiter reuses some mechanics and play systems of Killer Bunnies and the Quest for the Magic Carrot, such as the method of playing cards being the same, the main changes between the games are the use of boards, ships and the change to the method of collecting carrots.

== Expansions ==
The game has had two expansions which added new ships, sectors and bunnies to the base game.

The Laser Red booster deck expansion released in 2008 adds three sectors of the board, red bunnies, more ships, and introduces the Beyea aliens as well as the planet Saturn.

The Violet, Orange and Green Booster Combo Deck expansion released in 2012 adds nine sectors of the board, new ships and bunnies.

So far, there have been two promo cards which are usually given alongside the game when you purchase it from playroom or most retailers.

== Fan base ==
There are many fan sites dedicated to Killer Bunnies, one of which is The Magic Carrot . This site operates as a message board for players of the game to communicate opinions, ideas and conversation related to Killer Bunnies.
