= BattleDragons =

2002 tabletop role-playing game

- Cover
- Designers: Casey C Clark & Gabe Ivan
- Publishers: Spartacus Publishing
- Publication: 2002
- Genres: Fantasy
- Systems: Custom

BattleDragons is a role-playing game published by Spartacus Publishing in 2002. BattleDragons lets the player create and control one of the eight different dragon races in the Seven-Tiered world. It can be played as a role-playing game or a tabletop war game.

== Game setting ==
BattleDragons is played on the Seven-Tiered world created by the gods. The world consists of seven separate worlds layered on top of each other connected by The Tower. Other than dragons there are twelve intelligent races located on the worlds. (Human, Dwarf, Elf, Goblin, Orc, Ogre, Cherub, Fae, Centaur, Mer, Giant, and the Titans)

== Dragon creation ==
Each of the eight dragon races (Great, Mystic, Hydra, Wyvern, Basilisk, Wyrm, Feathered serpent, Bipedal) starts with a set number of creation points to spend on basic statistics, armor, weapons and other powers. Armor points work as the dragon's scales as damage is done they get ripped off lowering the dragon’s protection. There are several types of weapons for dragons to use including claws, teeth, horns, eyeblasts, poison, and breath attacks. Other powers to spend points on are wings, extra senses and magic.

== Game mechanics ==
BattleDragons uses a dice pool of ten-sided dice and a target number for most actions. The target number is found by starting with a base number and adding any good or bad modifiers to the chance and rolling the character's pool of dice. Every roll lower or equal to the target number counts as one success. The more successes scored the better the task is performed.
