= Pack & Stack =

2008 board game

Pack & Stack (original German name: Zak Pak!) is a 2008 board game designed by Bernd Eisenstein.

== Rules ==
Pack & Stack is a game about moving, in which players stack three-dimensional objects on top of each other.

The game can be played by three to six players. Every player starts out with 75 points. On each round, the each player rolls a set of five colour-coded dice, which then determine how many items the player must take. The items vary in length from 1 to 5 units. The player then draws two cards, representing moving trucks, from a pile, face down.

When each player has their items and cards, the players turn their cards face up. Each player selects a moving truck to fill from some other player, except the last player to do so, who must instead select a truck from the pile. Each truck is 5×3 units in surface area and 1 to 4 units high, although part of the surface area might be filled up in advance. The players then do their best to stack their items in the remaining volume in the truck. Any space left vacant counts as penalty points, and any items left over count as double penalty points. The player with the fewest penalty points is awarded 10 points.

When every player is finished, the players deduct their penalty points, and a new round begins. The game proceeds this way until one player runs out of points. At this point, the game is over, and the player with the highest number of points left wins.
