= The Big Taboo =

Board game

- Box cover and game layout
- Publishers: Winning Moves
- Players: 4 or more (on teams)
- Setup time: 5 minutes
- Playing time: 45-75 minutes
- Chance: Low-Medium
- Age range: 12 +
- Skills: Drawing; Language; Creativity; Deduction

The Big Taboo is a variation on the board game Taboo. It incorporates elements from games like Pictionary, Charades, and 25 Words or Less to create a party game with "a little bit of everything". The game was published in 2008 by Winning Moves Games USA and is no longer in production.

== Gameplay ==
To start the game, players divide into two teams. Through describing and correctly guessing keywords, teams advance their respective pawns around a spiraling track.

Each round, one person on each team gives clues to his or her teammates, who try to guess as many correct words as they can in the time allotted. The method and rules of clue-giving change each round, depending on the space the pawn landed on. On some spaces, clues are given using the rules of the classic Taboo game. On other spaces, clues must be drawn, limited to 15 words, or acted out using "Bendy Bob", a purple plush character included with the game.

Once the round's timer runs out, the team advances its pawn a number of spaces equal to the number of words they guessed correctly that turn. The turn then passes to the other team. Play continues until one team reaches the last space on the track.
