= UC Davis School of Education =

Coordinates: 38.5405°N 121.7467°W

University of California, Davis School of Education
- Type: Public
- Established: 2002
- Dean: Tom Smith
- Faculty: 40 full time, 23 part timef
- Students: 416
- Location: Davis, California
- Website: www.education.ucdavis.edu

The UC Davis School of Education is one of 10 schools and colleges at the University of California, Davis. It offers a wide range of academic and professional development programs.

In 2017–18, the School had 681 current students and more than 8,000 living alumni with degrees.

The School houses the following labs and centers: California Education Lab, Center for Applied Policy in Education, Center for Community & Citizen Science, Sacramento Area Science Project, Transformative Justice in Education Center, and Wheelhouse: Center for Community College Leadership and Research.

The founding dean, after its reclassification from "division" to "school," was Harold Levine.

== About ==
Education on the Davis campus dates back to 1918, shortly after opening, with a training program to prepare teachers to provide instruction in raising crops and animals commercially. The School of Education was formed in 2002 as a reconstitution of a long-standing division within the College of Letters and Sciences.

== See also ==
Daviswiki
