= The Riddle of Steel =

Role-playing game

Roleplaying with an Edge
- The Riddle of Steel core rulebook cover
- Designers: Jacob Norwood
- Publishers: Driftwood Publishing
- Publication: 2002
- Genres: Fantasy
- Systems: Custom

The Riddle of Steel (abbreviated as TRoS) is a role-playing game (RPG) created by Jacob Norwood and published by Driftwood Publishing. It is designed for role-playing in a typical sword and sorcery or high fantasy gameworld environment.

The title of The Riddle of Steel is inspired by several references in the movie Conan the Barbarian, including a line of dialogue in which the villain, Thulsa Doom, asks the captured Conan, "What is the riddle of steel?" Doom answers this question by explaining to Conan that the true strength of steel is in the hand that wields it – in other words, it is the resolve and commitment we bring to a task, not the quality or quantity of tools we use in performing it, that is the most important factor in determining success. This theme strongly influenced the design of Riddle, most particularly in the implementation of spiritual attributes.

== System ==
The base mechanic of the game is a die-pool system; to accomplish tasks, players roll a pool of ten-sided dice against the target number, or TN, of the task, with the number of dice equalling or beating the TN determining degree of success. Simple rolls are made against a set TN, whereas contested rolls are made by two separate characters and the one with the most successes, wins.

The game's combat system is based heavily on Jacob Norwood's real-world historical martial arts studies and his experience as a martial artist. He is the president of the HEMA Alliance, was a Senior Free Scholar in the Association for Renaissance Martial Arts, and John Clements, the director of that organization, recommends the game for its martial realism. This combat system is usually marketed as one of its key selling points. Melee combatants secretly decide to attack or defend after declaring stances, sometimes resulting in tense standoffs, and then declare any maneuvers they might wish to use. The combat is swift and deadly, with every hit causing a wound from the wound charts. It is entirely possible for a combat to be over on the first round.

The other primary hallmark of the game is the character design aspect known as spiritual attributes, often abbreviated "SAs" by game fans. Each player in TRoS defines up to five spiritual attributes for their character, specifying the areas in which they want that character to excel and demonstrate heroism. Possibilities include: faith (defending a religion or philosophical worldview), passions (love, hate or other strong emotions for someone or something), conscience (personal ethics), drive (a particularly strong intent or purpose), destiny (a future foretold), and luck (general good fortune and coincidence). This system allows players more control over the in-game performance of their characters, by granting the player extra dice whenever the character faces an obstacle in a situation where the player wants his character to shine. It brings a slight cinematic atmosphere to the game in that the hero can suffer defeat, but has uncanny luck and persistence in the crucial elements of the story.

The Spiritual Attributes also serve as the game's character improvement and development mechanic. Points are awarded to the attributes by the Seneschal (or game master) when characters act according to these attributes, and spent by players to increase attributes, skills, weapon proficiencies and other character aspects.

== Influences ==
The game, especially the combat system, was heavily influenced by the Polish series of stories about Geralt of Rivia, known as the Witcher series. The default sample character in the book is even called Geralt after him. The official fantasy world of the game, Weyrth, also shows strong influences of our world's history among its imaginary cultures and peoples, with some of the most well-developed being those inspired by Eastern Europe, such as Zaporozhya (from the Polish historical term for Ukraine) and the Rzeczpospolita, the Polish word for "Commonwealth". For historical inspiration, see Zaporizhzhia, Rzeczpospolita and Polish–Lithuanian Commonwealth.

== Reviews ==
- Realms of Fantasy

== Current Situation and Related Systems ==
The Riddle of Steel has suffered from distribution problems for years and there is a perception among fans that they are not likely to be solved.

As of early 2013, there was some worry among the fan community of The Riddle of Steel that the RPG might perhaps no longer enjoy viable commercial release channels. That was one factor that contributed to the creation of its licensed successor game Blade of the Iron Throne. "Blade" was published in 2013.
