= Quiddler =

Card game

- Designers: Marsha J. Falco
- Publication: 1998; 28 years ago
- Players: 1–8
- Setup time: < 1 minute
- Playing time: 20–30 minutes
- Chance: Medium
- Age range: 8 +
- Skills: Counting, Strategy, Bluffing, Anagramming, Vocabulary, Spelling

Quiddler is a card-based word game designed by Marsha J. Falco and published in 1998 by Set Enterprises. Players compete by spelling English words from cards in hands of increasing size, each card worth various points. The game combines aspects of Scrabble and gin rummy. The word "Quiddler" is a trademark.

== Play and scoring ==
=== Game play ===
Before play begins, all the cards are shuffled. A game of Quiddler consists of eight rounds; the first round has a three-card hand, the second round has a four-card hand, and so on until the game ends with a ten-card hand. While there is a single-player variation, the regular game requires at least two players.

In the first round, the dealer deals out three cards to each player. The remaining cards form a draw pile. The top card is turned over to start a discard pile. The player to the dealer's left goes first. The player may choose the top card from either the face-down draw pile or the face-up discard pile. The player adds this card to their hand. The player ends their turn by discarding one card from their hand so that the player ends up with the same number of cards as were dealt. A player may not use a dictionary during their turn, but the other players may. Turns are taken in the same manner in a clockwise rotation among the players. The round continues until one player can go out.

A player can go out if they can use all the cards in their hand to spell one or more allowable words. After a player goes out, every other player then has one more turn. On the last turn, each remaining player uses as many cards as possible to spell one or more allowable words.

After the round is finished, points on the cards used to spell words are counted toward the player's score. If the player had unused cards, the points on those remaining cards are subtracted. Ten-point bonuses are added to the score of the player with the longest word and to the player with the most words.

The subsequent rounds follow in the same manner, with the hands increasing in size by one card each round. Thus, in the second round each player is dealt four cards, the third round five cards, and so forth. Points are added at the end of each round. The game continues until the end of the eighth round (ten cards in the hand). Depending on the number of players, the discard pile may need to be shuffled to resupply the draw pile.

The player with the most points at the end of the full eight rounds wins.

=== Allowable words ===
Players should decide on an English dictionary to be used during the game. An allowable word must appear as an entry in that dictionary or as one of the listed inflected forms of an entry word. Words must also use at least two cards. The makers of Quiddler have established several restrictions on the words used in a game: no proper nouns may be used; capitalized adjectives, such as "Iraqi" and "Scottish", may be used; prefixes and suffixes by themselves are not allowable words; words requiring a hyphen for proper spelling, such as "ex-wife" and "twenty-two" are also not allowed. The Quiddler rules disallow abbreviations, but do not differentiate between various forms. Players need to decide for themselves if they will allow acronym-derived words such as "laser" and "NATO". The rules contain no restrictions on English words with accented letters, such as "née", though the deck contains no such letters. Players must also decide for themselves if they will allow shortened word forms such as "ad" and "math".

A player may challenge any other player if they feel that the latter has used a word that is not an allowable word. If the word is an allowable word, the challenging player must subtract from their score the number of points in the word. If it is not, the challenged player must subtract from their score the number of points in the word. The challenged player may not re-arrange their cards to form other words.

== Deck ==
The card deck consists of 118 cards with individual letters from the English alphabet or common two-letter combinations. These include QU, IN, ER, TH, and CL. Each card has a point value reflecting its use in English words. The colorful and stylistic designs on the cards are based on illuminated letters found in Celtic manuscripts written over 1000 years ago. These source inspirations include the Book of Kells and the Book of Durrow. The Quiddler deck contents with point value of each letter and number of each letter (and combo) in the deck:

Deck distribution
| Letter | Point value | Quantity |
|---|---|---|
| A | 2 | 10 |
| B | 8 | 2 |
| C | 8 | 2 |
| D | 5 | 4 |
| E | 2 | 12 |
| F | 6 | 2 |
| G | 6 | 4 |
| H | 7 | 2 |
| I | 2 | 8 |
| J | 13 | 2 |
| K | 8 | 2 |
| L | 3 | 4 |
| M | 5 | 2 |
| N | 5 | 6 |
| O | 2 | 8 |
| P | 6 | 2 |
| Q | 15 | 2 |
| R | 5 | 6 |
| S | 3 | 4 |
| T | 3 | 6 |
| U | 4 | 6 |
| V | 11 | 2 |
| W | 10 | 2 |
| X | 12 | 2 |
| Y | 4 | 4 |
| Z | 14 | 2 |
| ER | 7 | 2 |
| CL | 10 | 2 |
| IN | 7 | 2 |
| TH | 9 | 2 |
| QU | 9 | 2 |

== Reception ==
Quiddler was Funagain Games' 49th bestselling game of 1999. It was featured in Newsweek's 2004 list of the "perfect presents" for the holidays. Keith Stuart, writing for The Guardian, noted that the game's use of shorter words gives it a faster pace and makes it more accessible than Scrabble. In an article for Reader's Digest, Chloë Nannestad described Quiddler as "the best 2-player card game around" for those who enjoy word games. Natalie B. Compton praised Quiddler in an article in The Washington Post for its "addictive" gameplay and easily explainable rules. The San Francisco Chronicle rated the game 3/5 stars, describing it as a "fine word game."

=== Awards ===
Quiddler has won the following awards:

- 2008 TDmonthly Classic Toy Award
- 2008 Creative Child's Seal of Excellence Award
- 2007 Creative Child's Seal of Excellence Award
- 2005 Creative Child's Preferred Choice Award
- 2004 ASTRA Hot Toys
- 2000 Games Magazine 'Games 100' Award
- 1999 Parents' Choice Award
- 1999 MENSA Select Award
- 1999 Dr. Toy's Best Vacation Winner
