= Universalis =

Tabletop role-playing game

- First edition, 2002
- Designers: Ralph Mazza, Mike Holmes
- Publishers: Ramshead Publishing
- Publication: 2002
- Genres: Universal

Universalis, subtitled "The Game of Unlimited Stories", is a role-playing game (RPG) published by Ramshead Publishing in 2002 that stresses interactive storytelling. The game uses a unique system, based on "coins" that are used to make additions to the game, which allows the entire group to participate in the creation of the setting and events in play without a traditional gamemaster. The rules also provide a means of negotiating their own alteration, allowing for unlimited customization for play. The system is meant to support any possible genre.

== System ==
=== Story power ===
"Coins" are the measure of story power in Universalis. By spending coins, players can create "facts" in the game. These may be about characters, the setting, or the scene being played. Each player begins with a number of coins (typically 25), and gains more after each scene plays out (typically 5). Players may also gain coins by winning "complications" (see below).

=== Setting tenets ===
Unlike most RPGs, where the game setting and any setting-specific rules are either taken from a published source or created by the gamemaster, Universalis play begins with the setting of "tenets" which define the nature of the setting.

Going in a circle around the table, each player has the option to spend a coin to establish a tenet, or to pass. Tenets can be challenged using the rules, but it is more common for players to simply negotiate an amicable settlement when there is a disagreement about a proposed tenet. Once no more players want to establish new tenets, the initial phase is over and the game begins.

=== Scenes ===
Universalis is played out in scenes. Players bid coins for the privilege of establishing a new scene—the high bidder wins, and sets the location and time, and introduce characters or items into the scene. Play then proceeds around the table, with each player having the chance to narrate and spend coins. Spending coins establishes new facts in the game, which can be drawn on by the other players, and used in resolving complications. A player may interrupt the normal flow by spending a coin to do so, immediately having their turn.

=== Challenges ===
When a player wishes to establish a fact and another wants to oppose it, a challenge results if the two players cannot come to an agreement. Established facts can be drawn on in the challenge, and all players have the chance to weigh in with their coins. When everyone has spent the coins and called on the facts that they wish to, a die roll is then used to resolve the challenge (with the dice rolled depending on how many facts and coins each side has). The winner gains new coins, and narrates the result of the challenge.

=== Modifying the rules ===
Rules in Universalis are just another kind of fact, and can be established by spending coins.

== Publication history ==
Universalis was created by Ralph Mazza and Mike Holmes and published by Ramshead Publishing in 2002. Ramshead released a Revised Edition in 2006.

== Reception ==
In his 2023 book Monsters, Aliens, and Holes in the Ground, RPG historian Stu Horvath noted, "Universalis is a game that wants to flow past mechanical hiccups as quickly as possible and it is often preferable to handwave a solution that appeases all parties rather than looking up something in the book. The story is the focus, and keeping it going is paramount." Horvath concluded, "Universalis is actually mind-blowing. It is a simple system that emphasizes creative collaboration and is versatile enough to handle literally any kind of story players can dream up. That is quite an accomplishment for a digest-sized RP{G book."

== Awards ==
At the 2002 Indie RPG Awards, Universalis was the winner of the category "Most Innovative Game."
