= The Game of Life: Card Game =

Card game based on the board game The Game of Life

- Designers: Rob Daviau; Milton Bradley
- Publishers: Parker Brothers; Hasbro
- Players: 2–4
- Setup time: 2 minutes
- Playing time: 30 minutes
- Chance: Medium
- Skills: Hand management

The Game of Life: Card Game is a card game created by Rob Daviau and published by Hasbro in 2002. The object of the game is to collect as many points as possible before the letters for L.I.F.E. are drawn. The game begins with each player first deciding whether to pick a career right away or go to college and get a career afterwards. Each turn, players draw to fill their hands and then complete goals by playing cards from their hand. Goals are completed by paying their cost in money or time. Each turn, a player has as much money or time as their career (and other time/money altering cards) allow. Goals have an associated point value to them and the player or team that collects the most points at the end of the game wins.

== Other versions ==
Shuffle: Game of Life Card Game is a different card game where the aim of the game is to be the first person to get 100 life points by getting rid of all the cards in their hand by making sets and runs or adding to other players sets and runs.

The Game of Life: Adventures Card Game is a 2010 game that is also different from The Game of Life: Card Game.
