= Sexy Slang =

Board game

Sexy Slang Adult Party Game by PFF Entertainment.

Sexy Slang is a board game made by Icebreaker Entertainment, previously known as PFF Entertainment, in New York City. Sexy Slang is an adult party game similar to Pictionary and Charades, but with risque clue words. The game is played with four or more people, who divide into two teams that race to draw the same naughty terms or act the same sexy charades terms at the same time.

Launched as PervArtistry in 2008 by Christi Scofield and Ted Scofield, Sexy Slang started as a tested concept at dinner parties and vacation houses, and later spread to novelty and adult stores. The name was changed to Sexy Slang in order to sell to mainstream retailers, and is now sold at over 1000 retail stores.

The Sexy Slang brand has four products to date: "Sexy Slang" (the original), "Sexy Slang's Naughty Charades", "Sexy Slang's Sex Position Darts", and the book "Sexy Slang's Bedroom Challenges: 69 Ways to Spice Up Your Sex Life" in addition to an apparel line, accessories, and iPhone applications with the same name.
