= Realm of the Desert Sons =

Board game

Realm of the Desert Sons (German: Im Reich der Wüstensöhne) is a German-style board game published in 2008 by Klaus Teuber, published by Kosmos in Germany. It is the second game in the Entdecker trilogy of games, a series of games featuring the mechanics of Teuber's previous game, Entdecker, adapted to new themes. Unlike the previous game, Realm of the Jade Goddess, Desert Sons was available for a wide release, though there are no plans to publish the game outside of the original German language. However, a computer implementation has been available on the Catan GmbH website, with a full English language translation.

Desert Sons is considered to be the middle game in terms of complexity in the trilogy, roughly on par with the original Entdecker.

== Gameplay ==
The game takes place on a board 11 tiles wide by 11 tiles tall. Initially, only the tiles in the middle row and column are uncovered. Each tile consists of portions of desert and oasis, with connecting lines in brown or white through the centers of each tile (brown through desert portions and white through oasis portions). In addition, oasis portions may contain "action icons", which are used in the game.

Each player begins the game with a camel representing the player's caravan, and four explorers of different heights. The heights of explorers of different players are also different, but such that the total height of a player's four explorers are the same. At the start of the turn, players place their camels on the first or last tiles on the middle row or column, with each player placing their camel on different tiles. Each player is also given one tile in reserve, and two water stones, which act as the game's currency.

At the start of each turn, the player may first move their camel. Camels may freely move along the brown lines, but must stop once the camel moves over a white line; once per game, a player may pay one water stone in order to freely move the camel along the white lines. Camels may not be placed on tiles where occupied by other camels, but may move over them. If the camel ends at a location facing unexplored terrain (where no tile exists), discovery occurs and the player may either draw a tile and place it or place a tile from their reserve. Once per game, the player may also pay one water stone to place a tile from another player's reserve (the player then draws a new tile and place it in their reserve). Tiles placed must be adjacent to the camel's position, such that the lines connecting it to neighboring tiles are of the same color, and such that tiles placed on the edge of the game board are placed with the desert sides out (as if the edge of the board has a brown connecting line); if no such placement is possible the tile is placed in the player's reserve, and the player's turn ends. If a new tile is placed, the camel is then moved to the newly discovered tile. If the tile is entirely composed of desert, the player may move the caravan again and place tiles, if necessary.

After discovery occurs, the players may either place an explorer on the newly discovered tile, or remove an explorer already on the board. Explorers must be placed on oasis sections of tiles, and may not be placed on the same portion as an action icon. Oases are considered complete if they are entirely surrounded by desert or the edge of the game board, when they are scored. If there are at least two explorers (even if they belong to the same player) in the completed oasis, the player with the tallest explorer must pay one water stone or remove the explorer from further scoring. Each explorer then claims an action icon by order of their height; if there are not enough action icons for all the explorers the remainder get nothing. Then, after each player then takes the action indicated by the action icon, the explorers are returned to the player's reserves. (As all explorers are of different heights, one explorer is always taller than the others. To counteract this, one player is given the turban, which is assigned to the player's tallest explorer. The explorer with the turban is always considered to be the tallest regardless of its actual height, and the turban is passed around when the explorer with the turban is involved in the scoring of an oasis.)

Action icons allow players to earn water stones, claim one of four merchandise items and place it in their caravans (which initially may hold four items), expand the capacity of their caravan by two items, or place a "rumor tile" on a small board. If in the event a player with a full caravan claims a merchandise item, they may discard the newly acquired merchandise item or discard a caravan item to make room. Rumor tiles add or subtract the victory point value of each item of merchandise by up to two points. There are six rumor tiles, but only two rumor tiles may be assigned to a particular merchandise item. Players may look at a rumor tile when they are placed, but they are placed face-down on a special rumor board that keeps track of the merchandise values. If all six rumor tiles are in place and a player chooses a rumor tile action, they may remove a rumor tile, which can be replaced by a later rumor tile action.

Once per game, the player may pay one water stone to take a second turn at the conclusion of their turn.

The game ends when the last tile is played, and one last turn is taken by each player. The rumor tiles are turned face-up, and the player with the greatest total value of merchandise wins, with the number of water stones as a tiebreaker.
