= Pyramid Power (game) =

- Box and game tiles
- Publishers: Winning Moves
- Players: 1 to 4
- Setup time: 2 minutes
- Playing time: 5-10 minutes
- Chance: Low
- Age range: 10 and up
- Skills: Tile Placement

Pyramid Power is a tile game, where the goal is to score points by placing triangle-shaped tiles next to other triangle-shaped tiles so that the colors on the touching faces match. Doing so scores the player points. It was published by Winning Moves Games USA in 2008 and is one of three games in their Brain-Ade line of quick puzzle games and features both multiplayer and solitaire versions. This game is no longer in production.

== Gameplay ==
The goal of the game is to play all of the tiles in your hand and score the most points. Players start by choosing one player to keep score. The 36 tiles are placed face down and shuffled, then each player draw a hand of tiles based on the number of players (7 tiles for 2 players, 6 for 3 players, and 5 for 4 players). The tiles are then flipped face up. Players must keep the tiles in their hand face up, but are allowed to stack their tiles so other players can only see the top-most tile. Players can look at the tiles in their hand at any time. The remaining undrawn pyramids are placed aside. One pyramid is drawn from these tiles and placed face-up in the middle of the play area as a start tile. Players choose a start player and that player chooses one pyramid from his stack and places it in play adjacent to another pyramid do that the adjacent side colors match. Doing so earns the player the number of points shown on the pyramid placed. Players may not "straddle" two pyramids by placing a tile so that one side is adjacent to two pyramids, but can place a tile so that two or more sides are adjacent to two or more aides of other pyramids as long as the colors of the adjacent sides all match. Doing so scores the player the points for the pyramid placed and all adjacent pyramids.

If a player is unable to play any pyramid in their hand, they must draw one from the face down supply and turn it face up. They then check to see if it can be played immediately anywhere on the board. If it can be played, it must be played. If it cannot be played, the tile is placed face up next to the players hand and can be played on a later turn instead of playing a tile from that players hand. Additionally, there is a wild pyramid that can be played and match any color on all sides, but is worth zero points. If a player has the wild pyramid in hand and cannot play any other pyramid, they must play the wild.

The game ends when one player plays the last pyramid in their hand. That play scores a bonus equal to the point values of all remaining tiles in his opponents' hands. If the face down supply runs out before any player's hand does, the player with the fewest remaining tiles in hand scores 25 points (but does not score for tiles in opponents' hands. If there is a tie for fewest, the player with the lowest score gets the bonus.
