= Tide of Iron =

2007 board game

- Designers: Christian T. Petersen; Corey Konieczka; John Goodenough
- Publishers: Fantasy Flight Games
- Players: 2–4
- Setup time: 15-30 minutes
- Playing time: 1-4+ hours (Scenario Dependent)
- Chance: Medium (dice rolling, luck)
- Age range: 12 and up

Tide of Iron is a World War II based wargame designed and published in 2007 by Fantasy Flight Games, also notable for publishing other large games containing a large number of counters and/or other components such as World of Warcraft: The Board Game and Arkham Horror.

In March 2013, Fantasy Flight Games announced a licensing deal with publisher 1A Games under which 1A would produce the Tide of Iron game line, including its current and future expansions. 1A Games refers to its upcoming Tide of Iron products collectively as the “Next Wave.”

== Overview ==
Tide of Iron focuses on the combat between German and American forces fighting World War II in Western Europe during 1944 and 1945. Expansions add new scenarios, units, and terrain from other theatres as well as new nations, such as the British and Soviet armies. Players take the role of division commanders, and play through a pre-designed scenario. The game takes place on twelve imprinted double-sided hex map boards/tiles, using cardboard markers and overlays of various types and plastic models for representing the variety of military units used in gameplay.

Game scenarios are given a title, descriptive write-up, player objectives, and force setup information. Scenario details provide further information about the scenario, including information on the number of rounds to be played for that scenario. Victory is determined by meeting, or preventing, the objectives from being accomplished. Strategy cards are used by players to influence the ebb and flow of battle.

The game comes with over 200 plastic infantry and vehicle figures. The infantry units are snapped into bases to form combat squads. The plastic figures are well detailed and include clearly distinguishable tanks like the American Sherman, the German Panzer IV and Tiger. Other components include markers for terrain, the terrain boards themselves, and unit tokens. An extensive rulebook lends credence to reviewers' Medium complexity rating.

== Gameplay Summary ==
=== Scenario and map boards ===
To begin, players choose the combat scenario for their game session and pick which nation each will control. Tide of Iron comes with six scenarios. The scenario chosen describes each player's objective (mission), historical notes, initial forces and deployment, helpful hints, any special rules, reinforcements, the battle map, special terrain features, and the victory condition for each side.

Following the scenario instructions, players find the relevant map tile boards and arrange them together forming the game board (battlefield). Battlefields often comprise terrain that is a mix of rough, clear, buildings, woods, hills, etc. Roads and streams can meander through particular areas either easing or obstructing vehicle and troop movement but may also provide cover. Furthermore, entrenchments, razor wire, pill boxes, tank traps, minefields and other obstructions often abound, creating a variety of tactical considerations. For instance, tank traps will impede movement of tanks, but infantry squad movement is unaffected while actually providing them some cover.

=== Strategy and operations cards ===
Each player now claims any Strategy card decks that his nation is granted by the scenario. A Strategy card deck might be "German Reinforcements Deck I" or "Morale Deck II," for example.

Then each player draws a number of starting Strategy cards (indicated by the scenario). A Strategy card from a Reinforcements deck might instruct to "Receive a full (infantry) squad composed of any combination of regular or elite infantry as reinforcements," for example. Also, among other things, air support and off-board artillery attacks are called in by specific Strategy decks.

Each player then takes Operations cards granted to him by the scenario (if any). An Operations card, for example, might read "Panzer IV units have a range of 6 (die roll) and a firepower of 6 when attacking."

=== Build infantry squads and place units ===
Tide of Iron (TOI) is designed as a squad-level game. Each scenario details the number of starting infantry, vehicles, and squad bases available to each nation. Each player will build his squads by placing his infantry figures into each squad base (a round plastic base with room to hold up to four infantry units). This is done by pushing the peg, found below each infantry figure, into the holes located in the squad bases. Infantry units include regular infantry, elite infantry, officers, machine gun crews, and mortar crews, each having unique attributes. Unless the scenario designates otherwise, players are free to customize their squads based on their intended tactics and strategy.

Many scenarios grant a nation a certain number of specialized squads. For example, a squad might be assigned a medic or an engineer, or perhaps an anti-tank weapon or flamethrower, each providing special advantages for the squad. Every squad base has a small protruding plastic hook, which can hold one specialization token to identify the squad's specialization, if any.

Players place their infantry squads and vehicle units (tanks, trucks, and halftracks) on the board in the areas indicated by the scenario.

=== Action, command and status phase ===
Each round (game turn) is divided into three phases; Action, Command, and Status. The number of rounds is dictated by the scenario.

The Action Phase constitutes the main portion of game play in TOI. The players alternate taking the number of actions specified by the scenario, typically three actions each. An action is usually moving or firing a unit (or both) or activating a Strategy card, for example. During these actions, tanks can be lightly damaged, heavily damaged or destroyed. Squads can be disrupted, pinned, weakened, or wiped out. When neither player has additional actions (which is typically when every unit has been activated), the Action Phase is over.

In the Command Phase, each player collects "Command" (resources) as a reward for controlling command objectives and victory points for controlling victory point objectives. As an example, if during the prior Action Phase, the American player controls a “2” American command objective (perhaps a building) and a “2” neutral command objective (perhaps a bridge), then he receives 4 Command. Available Command can be used to activate Strategy cards and gain initiative.

The Status Phase is a “clean up” phase that includes drawing Strategy cards, removing tokens, squad transfers, placing reinforcements, etc.

After the Status Phase of a round is completed, another round begins. This continues until the last round of the game is finished, or until one player reaches a victory condition designated by the scenario.

=== Winning the game ===
The various scenarios specify different victory conditions, based on the stipulated tactical or strategic situation.

For example, “At the Breaking Point,” considered a good scenario for new players, reflects the strategic situation in Northern France in late July, 1944. After weeks of heavy fighting following D-Day, the Allies finally overran the Germans and began their breakout across France with General George S. Patton’s Third Army rapidly advancing. Attempting to halt the Allied advance, German Field Marshal Günther von Kluge’s 116th Panzer Division attempted to cut off Patton’s supply line. In TOI and this particular scenario, 11 squads of American infantry are dug in to defend the American supply route against an approaching German force of 12 infantry squads supported by a Panzer IV. The German player wins by having his units occupy three specified hexes (American positions), thus representing a German breakthrough, presumably to the American supply route. The American player wins by preventing the Germans from occupying those same hexes for 8 rounds of play, thus holding their position and protecting Patton’s supplies.

Another example is in “Silence the Guns,” a scenario based on the Allied effort to push through fortifications along Germany’s Siegfried Line in early 1945. In this TOI scenario, the Americans bring to bear 15 infantry squads, two Sherman tanks, and two M3A1 half-tracks against a German defensive position of ten infantry squads highlighted by a pillbox situated on high ground. The Americans immediately win if they control the German pillbox (their objective) at the end of any round. The Germans win if they can hold the pillbox for six rounds. Noteworthy, is if the Germans can hold out at least four rounds, they are expecting reinforcements of two more infantry squads, two Sd.Kfz. 251 half-tracks and a Panzer IV. More reinforcements are possible via a German Reinforcements Strategy Deck granted the Germans by the scenario at the outset of the action.

== Basic Combat Mechanics ==
During a player's turn, that player can choose which units to activate during the Action Phase, one unit at a time until, usually, three of them have been activated. Then it's the other player's turn to do likewise. The players alternate in this way until all units on both sides have been activated, to complete the round.

A unit activation can be any of eight different actions for a given unit, but the two most basic actions are Advance (Move) and Fire (Attack).

=== Unit movement ===
All infantry figures have a movement rating of 4 (hexes) and they move and fight in squads, as a unit, though a squad could be down to one figure. Thus, squads can normally move up to 4 hexes during one action. The elevation and terrain traversed can reduce that movement to something less. For example, infantry moving uphill or walking through hexes depicting woods can only move half as fast.

In the way of comparison, a halftrack (which can transport 1 squad) can normally move up to 7 hexes in one action. A Sherman tank can move up to 6 hexes in a single action, assuming no obstructions. A truck (which can transport 2 squads) can move up to 4 hexes across clear terrain but up to 12 hexes if on a road.

Generally, once any unit performs one of the eight Action Phase activations, such as moving or firing, a fatigue token is placed down beside it to remind players that that unit has already taken an action and can't be activated again for the rest of the current round. Any unit that is not fatigued is called fresh. Only a fresh unit can be activated.

=== Concentrated fire ===
The rules permit units to both fire and move during the same action (Fire and Movement). However, if an infantry or vehicle unit focuses only on firing at a target, Tide of Iron considers it laying down concentrated fire. This is the standard way units fire in the game. How effective or deadly a unit is when concentrating fire on a target depends on several key factors. Staying with the basics, it depends on what type of unit is firing (firepower), what type of target is selected, and the target's range.

==== Firepower ====
The type of unit firing determines the firepower that can be brought to bear against a target. Infantry figures come in basically five types; regular, elite, officer, machine gun crew, and mortar crew. Each infantry type has two firepower ratings; one against infantry and one against vehicles, such as tanks. These firepower ratings equate to the number of dice that can be thrown for that infantry figure trying to score a hit on a selected target.

Resolving combat fire is done by rolling dice. To help keep things straight, black dice are rolled for attacking units and red for those defending.

For example, regular infantry have a firepower rating of 1 (die) against opposing infantry and also 1 against vehicles. So if a full squad of 4 regular infantry fired at any enemy squad, the firing player would throw 4 black dice, one for each figure firing. If that same squad fired on a tank, the firing player would likewise throw 4 black dice. Of course, the tank has armor. More on that later.

In the way of comparison, a machine gun crew normally has a firepower rating of 3 against opposing infantry and 2 against vehicles.

==== Target range ====
The normal range of regular infantry (also elite and officer) to hit enemy infantry is 4 hexes. In general, the closer the target is, the easier it is to hit.

For example, if the target is in an adjacent hex, it is considered at close range. At close range, each attacking die hits on all "4," "5," and "6" results. At Normal Range (2,3, or 4 hexes, in this case) each attacking die hits on all "5," and "6" results. At Long Range, which is double normal range, (5 thru 8 hexes away, in this case) each attacking die hits on all "6" results. If a target is beyond 8 hexes away, it would be out of range for a squad and so could not be hit at all.

For comparison, the normal range for a mortar crew firing at enemy infantry or vehicles is 8 hexes. But such a crew cannot target adjacent hexes, so there's also a minimum range for lobbing a mortar shell.

==== Line of sight ====
Even though a targeted unit may be within range of an attacking unit, a line of sight must be confirmed. That is, the firing player must confirm there are no hills, blocking terrain (wooded areas), or buildings between the firing unit and the targeted unit, in accordance with the rules.

A mortar crew doesn't need a direct line of sight to the target. A mortar crew can lob mortars over blocking terrain and hills and hit unseen targets as long as the mortar crew has a spotter. In Tide of Iron, any fresh friendly squad that does have line of sight to the intended target can direct the mortar crew's fire. This simulates radio contact between the mortar crew and spotter. Unlike other infantry figures, mortar crews don't fire at specific enemy units (squads and vehicles). Rather they target a specific hex as a whole. Any enemy unit within the targeted hex at the time of firing is in harm's way.

==== Cover and armor ====
Defending (targeted) units have basically two protections afforded them; cover and armor. Defending infantry may have cover, while vehicles may have one or the other, or both. This is where the red dice come into play.

For example, if a targeted infantry squad (or vehicle) is in a wooded hex, the cover value is +2. That equates to the defending unit granted two red dice to roll if attacked. The two red dice can offset what would otherwise be successful black attacking die rolls. Red (defending) dice are always successful on rolls of "5" or "6," regardless of range.

To clarify, if a squad of 3 regular infantry fired at any enemy squad in, say, "rough" terrain, the cover value is +1 (for rough terrain). Thus, this attacking squad would roll 3 black dice against 1 red die for the defender. For each hit that is not countered by a red die roll of "5" or "6," the defending player must remove one squad figure (of his choice) from the targeted squad base. Such eliminated figures are casualties.

An illustrative case of armor protection is if a Sherman tank (fire rating of 8 against vehicles) fired at a Panzer IV tank (armor rating of 4). The Sherman would therefore roll 8 black dice against the defender's 4 red dice. If the Panzer IV also happened to be in a wooded hex (+2 cover), then the total defense would be 4 (armor) + 2 (cover) = 6 red die defense rolls. In this latter case, each of the 6 defending red die rolls of "5" or "6" would cancel out each attacking black die roll indicating a hit, if any.

When hit, a vehicle becomes either lightly damaged, heavily damaged, or destroyed, depending on what its state of damage was before it was attacked and how many hits it receives. An undamaged vehicle taking one or two hits would become lightly damaged; if the same vehicle takes 3 hits, it would be heavily damaged, and 4 hits would destroy it. By the rules, lightly damaged vehicles have less degradation to their capabilities than heavily damaged ones. For instance, lightly damaged vehicles can still move (-1 of normal movement), but heavily damaged vehicles are immobilized and their firing capability is cut in half, among other problems.

Vehicle Reference Table
Vehicle	Mobility	Armor	Firepower		Target Range	
			Infantry	Vehicles	Infantry	Vehicles
Truck	4	0	0	0	0	0
Halftrack	7	1	4	2	5	3
Sherman Tank	6	4	6	8	5	6
Panzer IV Tank	6	4	6	10	5	8
Tiger Tank	5	6	6	13	5	8

==== Suppressive fire ====
Suppressive fire is a form of threatening fire and is often used as covering fire. The limited goal is to "keep their heads down," so to speak. Nevertheless, suppressive fire can certainly, at times, cause casualties and destroy equipment. Situations often arise in tactical combat when a unit's goals can be achieved by simply finding a way to keep the enemy from interfering. That idea combined with the fact that suppressive fire is markedly easier and quicker to achieve than inflicting casualties, renders suppressive fire very useful at times.

In Tide of Iron, there are two options for firing against infantry; Suppressive fire and Normal fire. Vehicles are not normally affected by suppressive fire so it's generally not an option against vehicles. Normal fire can be thought of as trying to inflict casualties, while suppressive fire is trying to temporarily incapacitate infantry. Before a unit fires at enemy infantry, the firing player must decide on either Normal or Suppressive fire.

If Normal fire is chosen, then each hit results in the loss of one infantry figure from the targeted squad; a casualty. The figure is removed from the squad base and put back in the box. The defender chooses which specific figures are lost and in what order. A squad that suffers casualties is said to be weakened.

==== Squad condition ====
If Suppression fire is chosen, then the effect of hits on a targeted squad depend on its condition prior to the attack. Bear in mind that a targeted squad may have already been hit with suppressive fire by one or more other enemy squads during the current or previous round, degrading its condition.

A squad can be in any of three conditions; normal, pinned, or disrupted.

Normal condition means the squad is not currently degraded by any previous suppressive fire. If a squad in normal condition takes 1 or 2 suppressive hits, it becomes pinned; if it takes 3 hits, it becomes disrupted; and if it takes at least 4 hits, it is routed (destroyed) and the entire squad is removed from the board.

If a squad in pinned condition takes 1 or 2 suppressive hits, it becomes disrupted; if it takes 3 or more hits, it becomes routed. If a squad in disrupted condition takes even 1 more suppressive hit, it becomes routed.

A pinned squad normally cannot move or fire, among other restrictions. A disrupted squad is similarly limited, slower to recover, and is pressed closer to being routed. Disrupted and pinned squads that survive the current round will recover prior to the next round during the Status Phase. Disrupted squads recover to pinned condition, and pinned squads recover to normal.

=== Opportunity fire ===
Another of the eight possible actions a player can take during the Action Phase is placing a unit in Opportunity Fire (Op Fire). Unlike other types of fire in Tide of Iron, Op Fire is announced and resolved during the opponent's move. There are times when a player may wish to fire at certain enemy units only if they should move during the opponent's turn. When that is the case, an Op Fire token is placed down beside the unit or units selected to do the firing (squads or vehicles). Such Op Fire units can only fire if enemy units move within their range and line of sight. If that happens, the units in Op Fire mode may interrupt that movement (open fire on them) at any time during the movement.

Once the Op Fire is resolved, the firing unit is fatigued (can take no other actions during the current round). Machine gun crews have a special ability, called Rapid Op Fire, which permits them to Op Fire repeatedly (at different moving units) without becoming fatigued. So one machine gun crew, during the same turn, could conceivably Op Fire at numerous enemy units as they move within the machine gun crew's range and line of sight.

If a unit targeted by Op Fire is a squad and receives suppressive fire and is pinned or disrupted, it is immediately fatigued and must stop. If the targeted squad suffers no hits or loses casualties (from normal fire), the targeted squad may continue on its way, albeit perhaps weakened. But as the unit continues, other enemy units in Op Fire mode may fire upon this moving unit. There are other rules concerning Op Fire.

=== Squad interaction ===
Mixed squads are those that have at least two different types of infantry figures, such as a squad with three regular infantry and one elite infantry figure.

Regular, elite, and officer infantry figures each have one peg and are classified as light Infantry. Machine gun crews and mortar crews each have two pegs and take up two places in a squad base and are classified as Heavy Infantry.

A squad base has room for four total pegs. A machine gun crew or a mortar crew is considered one figure but each has two pegs. This is important when you consider a squad can accommodate no more than two heavy infantry figures but can hold up to four light infantry figures. Of course, heavy infantry figures have more firepower so there is a balance that must be weighed and considered in light of the tactical purpose of a particular squad. One must also consider that if a heavy infantry figure is taken as a casualty, at least half of the squad will be lost.

Infantry Reference Table
Infantry Figure	Mobility	Firepower		Target Range	
		Infantry	Vehicles	Infantry	Vehicles
Regular Infantry	4	1	1	4	1
Elite Infantry	4	2	1	4	1
Officer	4	1	1	4	1
Machine Gun Crew	4	3	2	5	3
Mortar Crew	4	2/4	2/4	8	8

The officer infantry figure represents a trained and capable leader and affords certain advantages to his own squad, such as +1 movement. An officer also benefits nearby squads (those in the same hex as his squad) as they all receive +1 cover from suppressive fire. A nearby officer can also assist pinned squads in maintaining some firepower and aid disrupted squads in recovering quicker to normal condition. Up to three units can occupy the same hex at one time, but never more than two vehicles.

== Reception ==
The game has met with positive reviews, with reviewers often remarking on the customizable, open-ended nature of the game through its scenario system. Reviewers did note that the generic nature of the units and the uneven nature of some scenarios were minor detractions from the game. It was also one of seven games listed by Fortune Small Business as being worthy of putting the Xbox down to play.

The game was a nominee for the 2007 Editor's Choice Award on Tabletop Gaming News.

Other reviews:

- Rebel Times #10

== Expansions ==
=== Days of the Fox ===
Days of the Fox was the first expansion, released in Oct 2008. The title is a reference to German Field Marshal Erwin Rommel, who was admirably known as the Desert Fox. This expansion introduces the North African Campaign along with the British Army and includes nine new desert map boards. Also, anti-tank guns were added and are represented by plastic miniatures of the German 88mm Flak gun, as well as the British Ordnance QF 6-Pounder and American M1 57mm anti-tank guns, all with associated rules to integrate them into the broader TOI rule set. Other new pieces for all three countries were included along with additional game mechanics and six new desert theatre scenarios. Long out of print, "Days of the Fox" is next on the list of ToI products to be reissued by 1A Games.

=== Designer Series Volume One ===
Designer Series Volume One was released by Fantasy Flight Games in December 2008. This expansion (book) is a collection of 22 combat scenarios created specifically for Tide of Iron by numerous game designers such as John Hill (Squad Leader), Frank Chadwick (Command Decision) and Richard Berg (Great Battles of History). Fifteen of these scenarios require only the base game, while seven also draw from the expansion Days of the Fox.

=== Normandy ===
Normandy, published in 2008, expanded Tide of Iron to include the D-Day amphibious landings and subsequent beachhead operations, comprising Operation Overlord. Nine new map boards are included depicting Normandy terrain such as beaches, cliffs, the bocage (hedgerows), and those showing clustered buildings, to set up key French towns key to the fighting, like Saint-Lô, Bréville, and Caen. Included is additional British infantry, German Panther tanks and the very heavy German King Tiger tank. Self-propelled (assault) guns were introduced, including the German StuG III and American M10 tank destroyer. A campaign mode (rule set) is provided that links multiple scenarios together in sequence. Eight new scenarios are included.

=== Map Pack Expansion One ===
Map Pack Expansion One published in 2009 allows players to refresh their original map boards with updated artwork and richer, more vibrant colors. These upgraded maps can also be combined with existing boards to create massive, large-scale battles. The set also includes upgraded cardboard components from the base game, featuring enhanced obstacles like tank traps, bunkers, and hills. These improvements give players greater flexibility for designing custom scenarios and reenacting iconic battles.

=== Fury of the Bear ===
Fury of the Bear was released in 2010, themed for the conflict on the Eastern Front focusing on the Soviet Union and Germany. It includes nine new map boards with most panels featuring snow and ice covered terrain. This provides the look and feel of the notoriously brutal Russian winters, all tied to a suite of associated cold weather combat rules and Strategic cards. New components include the Red Army featuring the KV-1 heavy tank, T-34 medium tank, ZiS-3 76.2mm anti-tank gun, and SU-122 self-propelled gun. Other new units include the German PaK 40 75mm anti-tank gun. Eight newly crafted scenarios are provided, half of which are contested in winter conditions.

=== Stalingrad ===
Stalingrad, centered on one of the most famously besieged cities on Germany's Eastern Front, was released in the Fall of 2013 by 1A Games. Introduced is a new campaign game requiring players to manage various resources through a series of linked scenarios as they command elements of either the German Wehrmacht 6th Army or the Soviet 62nd Army. Included are Soviet infantry units, T-34/76 tanks and T-70 light tanks. Other units include the German Panzer III tank. New scenarios were designed and supplemental rules were added to reflect the extensive urban warfare, including street and house to house combat, that historically consumed the city. Twelve new dense urban map boards are provided.
