= Kamisado =

Abstract strategy board game

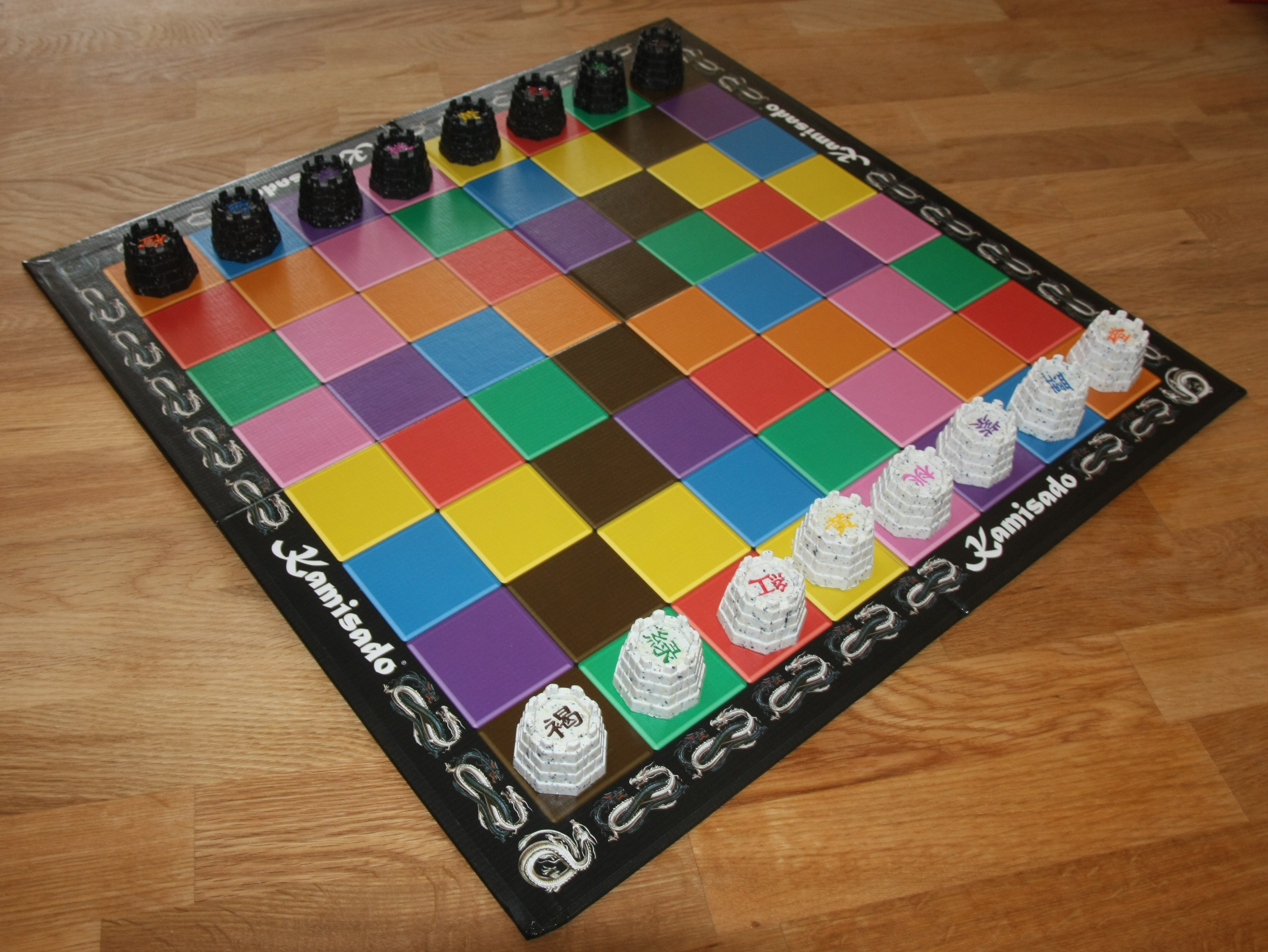
- Designers: Peter Burley
- Publishers: Burley Games
- Publication: 2008; 18 years ago
- Players: 2
- Setup time: 2 minutes
- Playing time: 30 minutes
- Chance: None
- Age range: 10 and up
- Skills: Strategic thought

Kamisado is an abstract strategy board game for two players that is played on an 8x8 multicoloured board. Each player controls a set of eight octagonal dragon tower pieces. Each player's set of dragon towers contains a tower to match each of the colours that appear on the squares of the board (i.e., a brown tower, a green tower, etc.). One player's towers have gold dragons mounted on the top, while the other player's towers are topped with black dragons. The game was published in 2008 by Burley Games.

== Origin ==
In an interview, designer Peter Burley said that the design of Kamisado dated back to a chance observation in a men's room in the 1970s. "I noticed that the floor had an interesting pattern of small colored tiles", he said. "I mentally made a note that this could possibly be used as a basis for a board game – this is something that I do quite a lot, whenever I see something a bit different. It must have made a deep impression on this occasion, however, because that night I had a vivid dream involving this tile pattern, and somehow the notion of 'whatever colour you land on, your opponent must move a piece that matches this'. I guess my subconscious mind had been working on this and sorted it out while I was asleep."

== Gameplay ==
The players' towers start the game on the row nearest to them. The players take turns moving one tower any number of spaces in a straight line, either directly forwards or diagonally forwards, but not into or through a square already containing another dragon tower.

The player with the black dragons moves first and may choose any tower. From this point onwards, each player must move the dragon tower that matches the colour of the square that the opponent's last move finished on. The object of the game is to reach your opponent's Home Row with one of your dragon towers. The first player to achieve this goal is the winner of the round.

Games may be played as single rounds, or as more advanced 'Match' formats. Matches are played up to 3 points (Standard Match), 7 points (Long Match) or 15 points (Marathon Match). During a match, each time a round is won, a special 'Sumo Ring' is added to the dragon tower that has fought its way through to the opponent's Home Row. The sumo rings provide the scoring system for the game, and also endow special powers to the dragon towers that carry them. These towers are known as Sumo towers and have the ability to push opponent's towers back one space, by using a move known as a 'Sumo Push'.

== Kamisado World Champions ==
The inaugural Kamisado world championships was held at the 15th Mind Sports Olympiad in 2011.

- 2011: (England) David M. Pearce
- 2012: (England) David M. Pearce
- 2013: (England) David M. Pearce
- 2014: (Estonia) Andres Kuusk
- 2015: (Estonia) Andres Kuusk
- 2025: (England) Peter Finn

== Solving Kamisado ==
As already known, the first player should win with optimal play, 17 moves are enough.
