= Hooop! =

Board Game

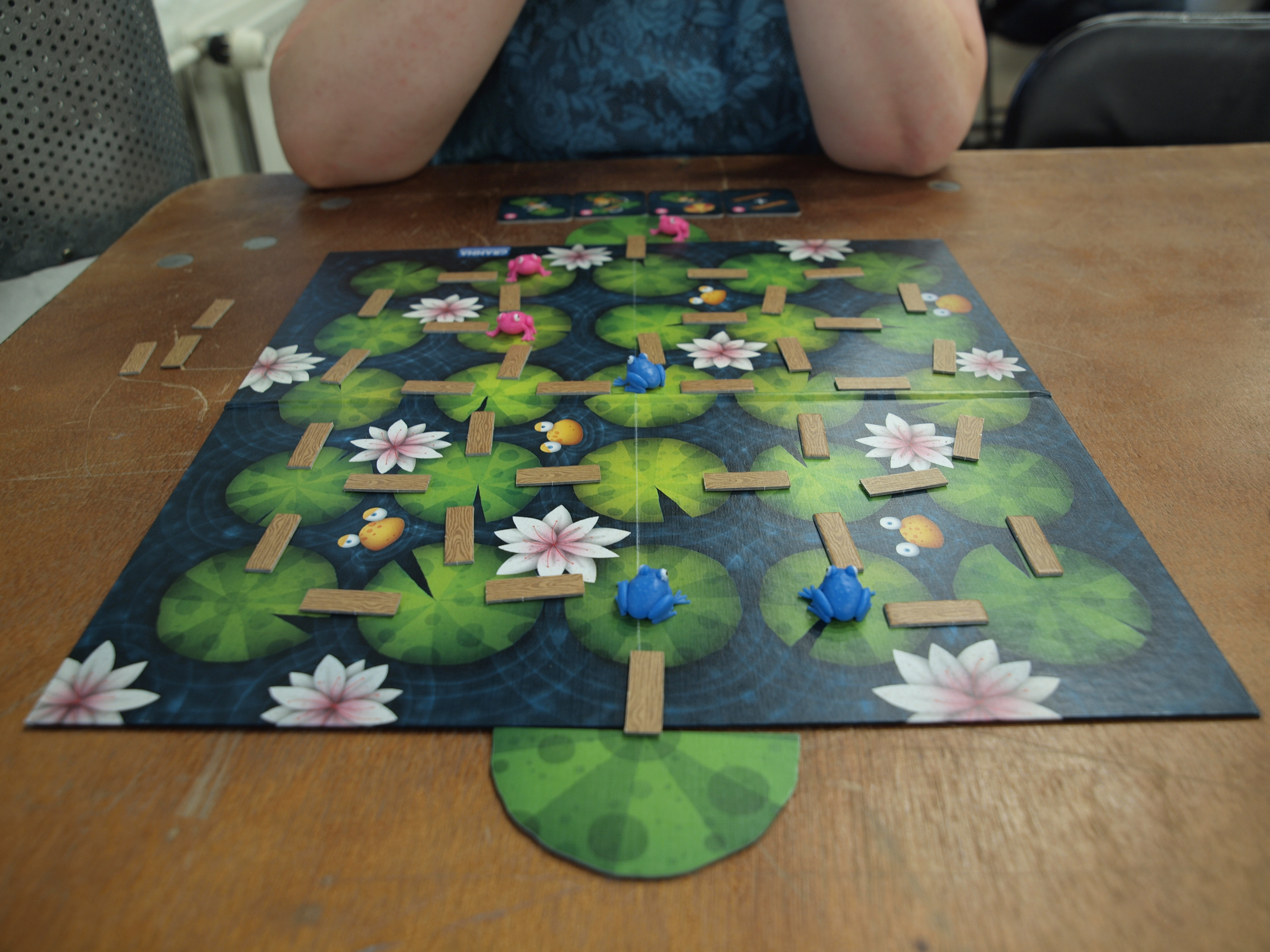
- Hooop! in the middle of a two-player game
- Designers: Adam Kałuża
- Players: 2-4
- Setup time: 1-5 minutes
- Playing time: 15-30 minutes
- Chance: None
- Skills: Path navigation

Hooop! is a 2008 board game designed by Adam Kałuża. The game is for two to four players.

== Rules ==
Hooop! is a game about frogs hopping on lily pads in a pond. Each player receives three frogs of a specific colour. The board consists of 25 lily pads arranged in a 5×5 rectangular grid. Each player's frogs start from the player's own base at their edge, and the object of the game is to get all three frogs to the bases on the edges belonging to the other players.

The lily pads are connected by wooden plank bridges. Each time a frog jumps to another lily pad, the bridge between them is removed. Frogs can only jump to other lily pads over bridges. A player can also use his/her turn to put a bridge back into place instead of moving a frog.

Only one frog can be on one lily pad at a time. Moving into a pad already containing a frog causes that frog to jump to another pad, and if that pad is also occupied, the effect cumulates.

Special one-time cards allow a player to move a frog twice in a row, put two bridges back in place, remove a bridge from anywhere on the board without moving a frog, or move a frog without needing a bridge. The first player to get all three of his/her frogs to the other players' bases wins.

== Reviews ==
- Rebel Times #18
- Świata Gier Planszowych #9
