= Hundred Kingdoms =

2002 board game

Hundred Kingdoms is a 2002 board game published by Black Orc Games.

== Gameplay ==
Hundred Kingdoms is a game in which a tabletop war game has simple rules that allow players of all experience levels to begin playing quickly.

== Reviews ==
- Pyramid
- Fictional Reality #9
