= Dungeons & Dragons: The Fantasy Adventure Board Game =

2002 Dungeons & Dragons board game

- Publishers: Parker Brothers
- Players: 2 or more players

Dungeons & Dragons: The Fantasy Adventure Board Game, released in 2002 by Parker Brothers, a division of Hasbro, is based on the role-playing game Dungeons & Dragons (D&D) by Wizards of the Coast. The game is distributed in the European market only.

== Gameplay ==
The game is similar to a dungeon crawl from the game D&D, although there is no role-playing involved. Player characters are pre-generated and there are no non-weapon proficiencies. While the quests are pre-determined in a booklet, an empty map framework is included, allowing users to make their own.

Instead of polyhedral dice, the game uses 6 Attack dice, 1 reveal traps die, 1 disarm traps die, 1 special die and 1 turn undead die.

The player can choose one of the four heroes, each with their own special abilities.

== Expansions ==
Two expansions to the core game are available:

=== Forbidden Forest Expansion ===
First published in 2004. Players from the first core game have to join forces with an old friend, Orwick, to find and defeat Orwick's druid brother-gone-evil Elwick and the Yuan-Ti, a race of snake-men in the Forest.

=== Eternal Winter Expansion ===
First published in 2003. The battle continues in the frozen winter wastelands. Here, vicious creatures roam the icy landscape, hunting for unprotected prey.
