= Trias (game) =

Board game

Trias is a board game authored by Ralf Lehmkuhl. It is distributed by Rio Grande Games, Tilsit Editions and Gecko Games.

The game is set in the Triassic period. ("Trias" is German for "Triassic".) Players maneuver dinosaur-shaped pieces and manage the "continental drift" of hexagonal tiles in order to spread their species and dominate the continents that make up the playing board, scoring points as they do so. The end of the game is when a meteor hits the earth, and the player with the most points wins.

The first edition of this game contains cubed wooden pieces to represent the dinosaurs. The second and later editions of the game contain vaguely dinosaur-shaped wooden playing pieces.
