= Scrabble ME =

Board game

- Box cover and game layout
- Publishers: Winning Moves
- Players: 2 to 4
- Setup time: 5 minutes
- Playing time: 45-60 minutes
- Chance: Low
- Age range: 8 and up
- Skills: Spelling; Tile Placement

Scrabble ME is a variation of the classic board game Scrabble, where each player plays on their own small board as it is opposed to all players playing on one main shared board. It was published by Winning Moves Games USA in 2008.

It is no longer in production.

== Gameplay ==
The gameplay is somewhat different from normal Scrabble, due to each player having their own board. Each turn, players build words on their boards simultaneously. Once all of the players do this, the round ends and players score their words. After each round, players will have the option to choose a replacement letter from the bag or, in another change from the classic version, select one of the face-up tiles on the raised tile holder.

Another new feature is an addition to the rules regarding the wild tile. Each time a wild tile is played, the player who utilizes the tile has to swap boards with an opponent, thwarting his strategy.

The game ends when all of tiles are in use and when the final word has been played. The player with the highest score wins.

== Components of board game ==
To play Scrabble Me, you need to have: a prize tile podium, 4 Scrabble boards, 4 player racks, Scrabble tiles.

== Remarks ==
The game can be played with 2-4 players and is marked suitable for players ages 8 and above.
