= A Touch of Evil: The Supernatural Game =

A Touch of Evil: The Supernatural Game is a 2008 board game published by Flying Frog Productions.

== Gameplay ==
A Touch of Evil: The Supernatural Game is a game in which a small band of monster‑hunting heroes races to uncover secrets, strengthen themselves, and track down a lurking supernatural villain before the village of Shadowbrook is completely consumed by darkness.

== Reviews ==
- Black Gate
- Rebel Times #20
- Rue Morgue #85
