= Set Cubed =

Board game

Set Cubed is a board game created by Set Enterprises in 2008. Set Cubed is based on the Mensa award-winning card game Set, and challenges a player’s ability to find "sets" by combining the dice in their hand with those already on the board. Set Cubed adds an element of strategy to the visual perception game of Set. It requires players to take turns and speed is eliminated.

== Game mechanics ==
A set is 3 dice that are either all the same or all different in each of their three features when looked at individually. The dice have 3 features: symbols, color, and the number of symbols. To start, place all the dice into the cloth bag and shake it. Each player reaches into the bag and blindly grabs 5 dice. All players then roll their dice simultaneously, the first person to see a set in his or her dice calls "set" and places the set on the logo in the middle of the board. The person to the left of that player then attempts to build as many sets as possible with up to three of their dice and the dice that are already on the board. That player’s score is based on all-new sets made using their dice. With each turn, the number of dice on the board grows and so do the potential set combinations. Each Bonus Square on the board boosts a player’s score the first time a die is played on it. Wild dice increase the players’ chances to make more sets.

== Awards ==
Set Cubed has won the following Best Game Awards:

- 2009 Parents’ Choice Gold Award
