= Dread: The First Book of Pandemonium =

Dread: The First Book of Pandemonium is a small press modern-day horror/splatterpunk role-playing game published by Malignant Games in 2002, then revised and republished by Neoplastic Press in 2007.

== Description ==
Dread is a role-playing game that uses the Disciple 12 rules system. The game posits that demons have returned to Earth, and are preying on humans. Players create player characters called Disciples who have been trained as demon hunters and then grouped together into a Cabal to wage a secret war against the demons.

The book opens with a short story about a demon attack on a small Oklahoma town. The book is then divided into six chapters :

1. An overview of the game system
2. Magic and Combat
3. Gameplay: An example game
4. Mastery: Advice for gamemasters
5. Demons: Profiles of 41 demons
6. Scenarios: Two complete scenarios, nine synopses, and a method for creating scenarios

The game rules are interspersed with short stories relating the adventures of a Cabal.

=== Disciple 12 ===
The Disciple 12 rules system uses a pool of 12-sided dice. To create a Disciple character, the player divides 9 points between the attributes of Body, Mind, and Spirit. The Disciple then receives skill points equal to twice the Mind total. To resolve an action, the gamemaster sets a target number from 2 to 14, and the player tries to equal or better this target by adding the appropriate attribute to the relevant skill, then rolling that many 12-sided dice.

== Publication history ==
Dread was designed by Rafael Chandler and published by Malignant Games in 2002. Five years later, Neoplastic Press released the revised "unrated" version, a 278-page book with interior art by Barb Bel, Claudia Cangini, Adam Chowles, Vivienne Gallant, and Charlene L. Reed, and cover art by Adwen Creative. Chandler designed a sequel titled Spite: The Second Book of Pandemonium that was released by Neoplastic Press in 2009.

== Reception ==
David Artman, writing for Flames Rising, related his play experience with designer Rafael Chandler as gamemaster, but thought that "even a neophyte [gamemaster] with a decent handle on the horror milieu could pick up Dread, read it [...] and be running with no problems or hiccups. It's a tight, simple system with myriad tactical options through wild narration." Artman did warn that players are expected to participate in the narration, and "Yes, this could mean a tricky ramp-up for reactive, passive players who just want the GM to make all the fun." He concluded with a strong recommendation, saying, "for players who want to collaborate on a story about kicking ass [...] Dread can't be beat in the splatter-punk, horror genre. [...] Get your gun, warm up the pick-up, check your spell books one last time… GO!"
