= Killer Bunnies and the Quest for the Magic Carrot =

Card game

- Blue Starter Deck Box
- Designers: Jeffrey Neil Bellinger
- Illustrators: Jonathan Young
- Players: 2–8
- Setup time: 15 minutes
- Playing time: 60–90 minutes
- Chance: High
- Age range: 12+
- Skills: Hand Management

Killer Bunnies and the Quest for the Magic Carrot is a noncollectible card game created by Jeffrey Neil Bellinger and graphic design/illustrations by Jonathan Young. Other artists have contributed to the game, including early contributions by "Alex" Alexander, plus Matthew Holliday, Alex Julian, Harry Moore and Dave Montes.

It was originally published by Playroom Entertainment, and later by Ultra PRO Entertainment. At the start of 2024, Killer Bunnies did not have a publisher and the creators are self-publishing the games.

== Gameplay ==
The objective of the game is to win, accomplished by acquiring carrot cards, one of which is revealed to be the winning "magic carrot" at the end of the game. The player with the winning carrot card must also have an alive bunny in the Bunny Circle. Acquiring carrot cards is done primarily through the use of bunnies, which allow the use of an enormous variety of in-game actions. Thus, the game revolves around playing bunnies and eliminating opposing bunnies through various means (some comical and some violent, but the game art never shows blood or gore).

Each player maintains a hand of five cards and a run cycle of two cards. In each turn, players normally turn the Top Run card face up to play it, then slide the Bottom Run card into the Top Run position, draw a replacement card, and place a card from their hand into the Bottom Run position, thus returning their hand size to five cards.

Cards may be one of different varieties: "Run" cards are the basic type of cards, while "Special" cards are those that may be either played normally, or may be saved for later use when put through the run cycle. "Very Special" cards are similar, except that the player may choose to play the card out of turn, immediately from their hand. There are also the "Play Immediately" cards, which are played whenever they are drawn. Finally, "Kaballa Dolla" cards represent the monetary currency in the game, which may be used to purchase various items at the start of the player's turns.'

== Expansions ==
Killer Bunnies consists of a 110-card starter deck, as well as Cabbage and Water cards, and 6 twelve-sided dice. Booster sets containing 55 additional cards and other equipment have been released, adding to the complexity of the game. As of the Epsilon revision of the game, Killer Bunnies includes the first booster set. Due to its nature as a noncollectible card game, each expansion relies on gameplay elements found in previous expansions, prompting players to own every previous booster set before acquiring the next one. Some have criticized the piecemeal release, although it is not atypical of collectible card games, to which Killer Bunnies retains a passing resemblance. However, Killer Bunnies and its booster decks were originally designed together, with certain components referencing or referring to mechanics found in later booster decks. There more than 12 booster decks (not including the Yellow booster which is included with the Blue starter):

- The Blue set is the starter deck, and contains eight Carrot cards, the Kaballa's Market starter card, and 101 cards used in the draw pile. The Blue deck features fifteen different bunnies (three colors of every type).
- The Yellow booster deck adds four additional Carrots to the game. It features yellow and violet bunnies, as well as the first Free Agent! bunny of the game. As of the Epsilon edition of Killer Bunnies, Yellow deck is included with the Blue starter. The combined decks include 12 small cabbage cards, 12 small water cards, and 12 small carrot cards.
- The Red booster deck (2003) adds Red Bunnies, which are bunnies that have built-in abilities that additionally benefit the player. This deck also comes with the Rooney's Weapons Emporium starter card, where players can buy used weapons and defense cards. This booster also adds four additional Carrots to the game. Small cards include a cabbage and a water card, as well as 6 defense cards and the 4 small carrot cards. A red dodecahedral die is also included.
- The Violet booster deck (2003) adds Specialty Bunnies, which are uncolored bunnies which may only be matched with each other to form Bunny Triplets. This booster adds the last four Carrots to the game and the twenty-sided dice. Another small cabbage and another small water card are included, as well as 6 more defense cards and the last 4 small carrot cards.
- The Orange booster deck (2004) adds Weil's Pawn Shop to the game. Players can buy dead bunnies from Weil's Pawn Shop, as well as six different colored "pawns." Pawns allow matching-colored dice to be re-rolled when a player has them in its possession, as well as allowing certain cards to be played twice before discarding. You can also make a bunny triplet with a pawn of any color and two bunnies of that same color. Four additional Specialty Bunnies are featured, as well as two Double Free Agent! bunnies. No small cards are included in this booster.
- The Green booster deck (2004) adds Zodiac cards to the game. Players collect Zodiac cards similarly to Carrots, and at the end of the game, but before the Magic Carrot is revealed, one Zodiac card is revealed to be the winning Zodiac symbol, which grants the holder of the respective Zodiac card greater chances of obtaining the Magic Carrot. Half-color bunnies have also been added, where these bunnies may be treated as either of two different colors. 12 small zodiac cards are included, and a 12-sided die featuring the symbols of the zodiac.
- The Twilight White booster deck (2005) adds The White Stuff, a twelve-sided white die, whose holder is granted the exclusive use of substituting the die for any unfavorable die roll. Two more pawns, a black and a white pawn, are added.
- The Stainless Steel booster deck (2005) adds Super Bunnies, which are more powerful but incur additional consequences if they are removed from play. Also included are 8 defense cards, and a cabbage and a water card. The cabbage and water cards give the player only 1/2 cabbage or 1/2 water, respectively.
- The Perfectly Pink booster deck (2006) adds Pink Bunnies, which are similar to Red Bunnies, but are more powerful. It also adds Ranks which must be assigned to bunnies, allowing the player owning the highest-ranked Bunny a special privilege.
- The Wacky Khaki booster deck (2005) adds 55 cards and introduces Officer Rank cards into the game.
- The Ominous Onyx booster deck (2007) adds Mysterious Places to the game. Players can play Mysterious Place cards, and during the game, the last player to draw one is granted the privilege of deciding the destiny of cards with a yellow ball with a red stripe in the picture. At the end of the game before the Winning Zodiac is revealed, the small Mysterious Place deck is inspected, and the player holding the Mysterious Place which matches the one at the bottom of the deck may take all Zodiacs of one color/type from any opponents. This booster deck includes 110 cards.
- The Chocolate booster deck (2010) adds 55 cards including the previously released (at conventions) Psi and Omega booster cards.

On July 9, 2017, Jeffery Bellinger announced that Killer Bunnies and the Conquest of the Magic Carrot and Kinder Bunnies: Their First Adventure would officially be smelted together under the Killer Bunnies and the Quest for the Magic Carrot games as official boosters. The four Conquest decks (Blue, Yellow, Red, and Violet) are to be added after the Chocolate booster deck and will be further referenced in forthcoming decks.

- The Fantastic booster deck (2017) adds 55 cards including the previously released (at conventions) Theta and Phi booster cards. This is the first released booster after Conquest and Kinder Bunnies have been officially smelted together with the Quest series. The booster also includes 27 unique small cards such as 0 cabbage/water/radish/milk units and -2 cabbage/water/radish/milk units.
- The Caramel Swirl booster deck (2018) adds 55 cards and a brown 12-sided die.
- The Creature Feature booster deck (2018) adds 55 cards, 12 small cards, and a 12-sided custom Chinese Zodiac die.
- The Pumpkin Spice booster deck (2018) adds 55 cards and 10 markers to track cards that have been traded.
- The La-Di-Da London booster deck (2020) adds 55 cards, 4 new carrots, and 12 small cards.
- The Cake Batter booster deck (2021) adds 55 cards, 10 bonus KinderBunnies Carrots, a brown pawn and 10 small cards.
- The Radioactive Robots booster deck (2024) adds 55 cards, 4 new carrots, 2 small cards, and 16 radiation markers.
- The Almond Crisp booster deck (2024) adds 55 cards and 6 multi-colored pawns.

== Kids Game ==
In 2004, the kids version of Killer Bunnies, KinderBunnies: Their First Adventure, was released. It is a very simplified and largely nonviolent game, created for children as young as five years old. The Sky Blue Starter Deck has very little reading and just a series of basic cards. The Sunshine Yellow Booster Deck (included in the same box as the Starter Deck) requires more reading and may not be suitable for the younger kids. In July 2024, Creative Team Alpha released five "promo" cards and a red 10-sided die, and released KinderBunnies: Their Second Adventure the following October. The KinderBunnies cards can also be added to the Killer Bunnies cards as additional booster decks.

== Sequels ==
Sequels to the original Killer Bunnies game have been released. Killer Bunnies and the Journey to Jupiter was released in October 2008. There is also a third game in the series by the name of Killer Bunnies and the Ultimate Odyssey that was released in 2010. Odyssey, like the others, is non-collectible and constructible. However, in order to fulfill players' desires for less randomness, it involves players building their own unique decks to draw from, instead of drawing from a central pile.

In 2011, Playroom Entertainment also released Killer Bunnies and the Conquest of the Magic Carrot. It is nearly identical to the original game in terms of gameplay – for example requiring Radish and Milk to feed a bunny instead of Cabbage and Water – but remained fully compatible and, as of 2017, is considered a fully amalgamated part of Quest for the Magic Carrot.
