= Settlers of the Stone Age =

The Settlers of the Stone Age is a 2002 German board game, heavily based on The Settlers of Catan, with a Stone Age theme. It is a member of the Catan series of games, and as such it is created by Klaus Teuber and published by Kosmos in German and Mayfair Games in English. It was rereleased in 2022 as Catan: Dawn of Humankind.

== Gameplay ==
Settlers of the Stone Age is a board game designed for players aged 10 and up, where participants take on the roles of early humans. Using familiar mechanics of exploration and resource management, the game simulates prehistoric migration, allowing players to hunt, gather, and traverse shifting landscapes as they expand from Africa into other continents.

The game is played upon a fixed board representing a map of the world. Each player is in control of a separate tribe, and the tribes have, at the start of the game, colonized the entire continent of Africa. Players seek to gain victory points by settling in the four other major areas around the board: Europe, Asia, Australia, and the Americas.

Gameplay is similar to Catan in that resources are collected in the same manner, but that is how the similarities end. To expand, players must use their resources to create explorers, then use resources to move the explorers to a new location, where, for an additional cost in resources, the explorers are turned into new settlements. A player has a limited supply of settlements, and if the supply is exhausted, one settlement must be disbanded to make room for the new settlement.

Resources may also be spent on developing technologies in one of four different paths, each of which has their own benefits. The first player to reach the highest level in any given technology is awarded victory points.

Scattered throughout the board are exploration markers, which may be uncovered if a player has the sufficient levels of technology and has an explorer that moves past the marker. Exploration markers may grant victory points, cause desertification in Africa (where hexes cease to become productive), or allow the player to move either one of the game's two robber figures: the Neanderthal and the sabre-toothed tiger.

== Reviews ==
The game received positive reviews.

- Syfy
