= Frag (game) =

First-person shooter-themed board game

- Players: 2-6
- Setup time: 20 minutes
- Playing time: 60–120 minutes
- Chance: medium-high
- Age range: 12+
- Skills: Some strategy

Frag is a first-person shooter-themed board game published by Steve Jackson Games in the summer of 2001. It was developed by Steve Jackson and Philip Reed, and illustrated by Alex Fernandez.

== Gameplay ==
The game comes with three decks of cards: "Weapons", "Gadgets" and "Special". "Weapons" and "Gadgets" are cards that can be picked up by landing on power up spaces on the board, while "Special" cards can only be obtained by "fragging" (killing) a player.

To start the game, each player creates a character by allocating a total of seven points to three attributes: health, speed and accuracy. Health points affect resistance to damage, speed points affect the amount of movement per turn and accuracy points affect "to hit" rolls. A very high accuracy can allow a character to fire two or even three times per turn.

At the start of each turn, the player rolls dice to determine maximum movement spaces. As players move, they can land on a variety of spaces (trap, acid, water, power up, etc.). Players may also attempt to shoot other players. The less distance to the target, the greater the chance to hit. If a to hit roll is successful, the defender rolls health dice and the attacker rolls damage. If the target is reduced to zero health, the attacker scores one "frag" and the target player respawns on his/her next turn.

The game can have several objectives, including:

- Score - Being the first player to score a specified number of "frags".
- Survival - Being the last person still in the game.
- "Guardian" mode - Killing a certain character, with other members attempting to provide protection.
- Capture the flag - One team capturing the opposing team's flag a certain number of times.

The original version is out of print. The new version, Frag Gold Edition, released in 2009, includes upgraded components: a two-sided solid gameboard, plastic figures, erasable character cards, and 18 dice.

== Expansions and Spinoffs ==
Several expansions and spinoffs to the original Frag game have been made:

- Frag: Death Match, the first expansion, released in October 2001, adds rules for team play and new board features like barrels, color-coded doors and water. It includes an extra board.
- Frag: Fire Zone, the second expansion, adds lava, rocket jumps, knockback effects from weapons and jump pads. It includes two extra boards.
- Frag PvP, technically the third expansion (as it needs base Frag to play), merges Frag with Scott Kurtz's hit comic PvP.
- Frag Deadlands merges Frag with the GURPS Deadlands campaign setting. This is a boxed edition making it a stand alone game. It also adds a new card type - "Hex."
- Dork Frag, only available in Dork Tower Issue #25 and in the Dork Tower board game, merges Frag with the characters from John Kovalic's hit comic Dork Tower into a truncated stand-alone edition.

== Reception ==
The Wargamer wrote: "As a new contender for the title of the ultimate nightcap of beer & pretzel games, Frag is a great game that entertains without mentally taxing players." 3DActionPlanet concluded: "A terrific concept, fast gameplay, and easy-to-learn rules combine to make this game one of a kind." SciFi.com wrote: "As is, Frag!'s a decent beer-and-pretzels board game that's good for a few Saturday afternoons' worth of play."

== Awards ==
Frag was a nominee in the 2001 Origins Awards for Best Abstract Board Game.
