= PlayMonster =

American toy company

PlayMonster Group LLC
- Type: Private
- Industry: International toy, game, craft, and activity company
- Founded: 1985; 41 years ago (as Patch Products); February 2016; 10 years ago (as PlayMonster)
- Founders: Fran Patch; Bryce Patch
- Headquarters: Beloit, Wisconsin, U.S.
- Products: Criminal Minds UNknown SUBject; Drone Home; Farkle; Five Crowns; Koosh ball; Loopdedoo; Loopdeloom; Roominate; Quiddler; Set (card game); Spirograph Animator; The Magical World of Disney Trivia; The Original Magnatab; Utter Nonsense!; Windward; Wooly Willy; Yeti in My Spaghetti; 5 Second Rule
- Brands: Ann Williams; Colorforms; Craft-tastic; Craft-tastic Nature; Craft Crush; Fashion Plates; Glo Friends; Koosh; Latchkits; My Fairy Garden; Snap Ships; Spirograph; Take 'N Play Anywhere; The Original Magnatab; Waterfuls; Weeble; 5 Second Rule
- Owner: Adams Street Partners and H.I.G. Capital
- Website: PlayMonster

PlayMonster (formerly Patch Products) is a manufacturer and marketer of family entertainment products that specializes in games, children's puzzles, toys, activities, and teaching tools founded in 1985. In February 2016, Patch changed its company name to PlayMonster.

== History ==
=== Patch Products ===
In 1971, brothers Fran and Bryce Patch opened a commercial printing company, producing games and related items for other companies. They printed Trivial Pursuit game boards and Cabbage Patch Kids sticker books, among other products.

In 1985, Fran and Bryce Patch began their own toy and game company: Patch Products. The company started a line of PuzzlePatch tray puzzles for preschoolers, which are still in production; the company produced its 100 millionth puzzle in 2008. The American Toy Institute, Great American Toy Contest, National Association for Gifted Children, Nick Jr. Magazine and Toy Tips have recognized the puzzles for helping educate children.

In 1992, the company obtained the license for TriBond, its first board game, which was inducted into Games Magazine's Hall of Fame.

Patch followed the success of TriBond with two other board games in 2000, Blurt! and MadGab. The company sold the brand rights to these games to Mattel in 2004.

Patch Products acquired Smethport Specialty Co., the maker of Lauri Toys and specialty products, in 2008, adding educational items to Patch's lineup, including Tall-Stackers pegging and crepe rubber puzzles, along with the Wooly Willy magnetic personality.

In 2009, Patch Products secured the rights to create a fresh version of the popular Are You Smarter Than a 5th Grader? board game based on the TV show hosted by Jeff Foxworthy.

Patch Products introduced 5 Second Rule in 2010. 5 Second Rule would go on to be played on The Ellen Show for over six years. Patch Products also developed a nostalgic line called Treasured Toys, which included bringing back favorites Yakity-Yak Teeth, Shark Attack, and Bed Bugs.

In 2011, 5 Second Rule was a finalist for Game of the Year TOTY Award.

Patch Products was honored with a Wisconsin Family Business of the Year Award in 2012. The Work Hard—Play Hard Award was given to Patch to recognize the company's emphasis on family fun to promote togetherness.

In 2013, Patch Products, was the distributor of the Perplexus 3D maze game to independent toy and gift stores. It also became the new manufacturer and distributor of The Game of THINGS. Patch debuted its new collectible soft doll line Planet Sock Monkey which adds attitude and style to the classic sock monkey: each doll features a its own name, personality, clothing, and accessories.

Patch Products was acquired by the private equity firm Topspin Partners in 2014. Shortly after, Patch Products grew with the acquisition of Onaroo, previously owned by American Innovative, LLC. This brand allowed Patch Products to expand into a new, complementary category of children's room décor.

=== PlayMonster ===
In February 2016, Patch Products changed its name to PlayMonster.

In 2017, PlayMonster had multiple TOTY Award finalists, and won Game of the Year with their kids game Yeti in My Spaghetti. PlayMonster also acquired Tinkineer and its Marbleocity line (laser-cut STEM kits).

In 2018, Topspin sold PlayMonster to Audax Private Equity. PlayMonster also acquired the UK-based toy company Interplay UK Ltd.

PlayMonster acquired Set Enterprises in 2019. PlayMonster also acquired Kahootz Toys. Patriot Capital became an investor in PlayMonster at this time.

In 2021, Interplay, acquired in 2016, rebranded to PlayMonster. PlayMonster also acquired Ann Williams Group, a Michigan-based manufacturer of craft and activity kits for kids and adults. Additionally, PlayMonster partnered with Dude Perfect to relaunch the Koosh brand, licensed by Hasbro, in time for the 35th anniversary of Koosh.

In 2022, PlayMonster promoted Tim Kilpin to CEO and gained investments from private market firms Adams Street Partners and H.I.G Capital. PlayMonster also relaunched Glo Friends, licensed by Hasbro. PlayMonster's take on the Glo Friends line introduces products featuring elements of Social–Emotional Learning.

Tim Kilpin transitioned to the newly created role of Executive Chairman and a member of the Board of Directors in 2023. Sitting President, Steve Adolph, was appointed Chief Executive Officer before leaving in 2024. Jonathan Berkowitz joined the company as CEO in March, 2024 after a 17-year tenure at Hasbro.

== Million Minute Family Challenge ==
From September through December every year, PlayMonster sponsors the Million Minute Family Challenge, a grass-roots effort to promote interaction and communication among family and friends through playing board games. The goal is to encourage at least one thousand families, groups, or organizations in each of the fifty states to play a board game together for twenty minutes, or a cumulative million minutes.
