= Bushido (board game) =

Board game

Bushido: Der Weg des Kriegers
- Designers: Heidelberger Spieleverlag
- Players: 3-5
- Setup time: 5-15 minutes
- Playing time: 2-4 hours
- Chance: Low-Medium
- Age range: 12+
- Skills: Tactics, Strategy, Diplomacy, and Economics

Bushido: Der Weg des Kriegers, translated to Bushido: Way Of The Warrior, is a board game based in feudal Japan where competing Daimyōs aim to gain enough honor to become the next Emperor of Japan. Played between three and five people, these competing Daimyōs attempt to gain 50 Daimyō honor through territorial conquest, samurai honor, or a surplus of combat katanas. During play, the current Daimyō assigns role cards to the other players which last until the end of the current Daimyō's turn. These role cards are: Samurai who will lead the Daimyō's forces into combat, Bushi who will be defending their territory, Sensei who will be providing council and utilizing effects, and (only in 5 player games) Hatamoto who has the option to lead a revolt against the Daimyō. The players have 12 months to reach 50 Daimyō honor, although this time may be extended by effects.

== Equipment and set up ==
Bushido utilizes a vast array of tiles and chips to provide a unique gaming experience to the players. Bushido comes with 32 Hexagonal squares to be used as the playing board, a smaller score board, a variety of square support tiles and circular tactics tiles, 33 troop markers in 5 colors, and 5 character cards.

Bushido is played on a Hex map made up of several different tiles. These tiles are shuffled and arranged face down so that the game has a different board each time. Players then take turns picking a base (which they leave face down), and then flipping tiles they want until all players control 6 tiles. Play begins with the oldest player, going clockwise. To offset the benefit of going first, while the first person draws 10 support tiles, the second person draws 11, the third twelve, and so on. All player count up their Daimyō honor on the board (the green symbol), and then add up their rice and swords. Players then place a number of troops on the board equivalent to their rice total. All this information is recorded on a small board provided with the game. Players then draw 4 tactics tokens each, and place their samurai honor at 10. Players must always have 4 tactics tokens, and if they lose one they must immediately draw back to 4. The game play then begins.

== Game play ==
During each turn, a Daimyō draws a number of support tiles equal to their sword count, and ensure their troop total is equal to their rice total. They then have the option of calling a tea ceremony to exchange Daimyō honor for Samurai honor, although this is usually only done if the Daimyō has a significant amount of samurai honor. The Daimyō then passes out the character cards to the other players, assigning the Bushi as the target of his attack. The Sensei is now allowed to play any effects he wishes, such as looking at another players hand or skipping the current Daimyō's turn. Other players may then do the same, although it is twice as costly for them to do so. If Hatamoto is present he draws two additional tokens, and can place Ronins on the board. Hatamoto then has the option of leading the Ronin into revolt against the Daimyō, causing combat between Hatamoto and the Daimyō. If the Daimyō wins the Ronins are removed, but if Hatamoto wins the territory becomes neutral. The Daimyō can then position his troops to where he wishes to invade. Combat then begins between the Samurai-led Daimyō's forces and then Bushi, with the winner collecting samurai honor. If the Samurai wins the territory falls under the control of the current Daimyō and scores are adjusted. If the Samurai loses he faces the council of the Sensei, where the Sensei decides how to punish the Samurai. punishments range from 0, 2-10 honor points or Seppuku, although the Daimyō has final say on if he agrees. The Sensei then determines if all players should 'call to arms' and receive additional support tokens, and if any player had the emperors symbol they may meet the emperor for aid. The game then progresses to the next player, and the time chart advances one month.

== Combat ==
Combat in Bushido is resolved by a mix of tactics and katana. The tactics follow a rock-paper-scissors style, although other factors may make certain tactics more effective. The katana amounts are adjusted by the tactics and troop amounts then compared, with the player with the highest total winning. Only the Battle tactic allows players to include their troop totals. Generally, Duel defeats Battle, Battle defeats Ambush, and Ambush defeats Duel, with the Traitor tactic defeating all three. Other tokes result in automatic loss. Combat provides Samurai honor based on troops killed, honor of the territory being fought over, and any incentives the Daimyō may have provided.

Combat between Hatamoto and the Daimyō does not award honor points to either participant.

== Honor and winning the game ==
Except for the beginning, at no point can two players have the same Daimyō or Samurai honor. If one player moves onto another players honor amount, the moving player progresses one additional square. Daimyō honor is gained in three ways: Selling Katanas, acquiring territory, and converting Samurai honor. At the beginning of the Daimyōs turn they may place three yellow triple katana tokens back in the support tile bag in order to progress up one Daimyō honor. the Daimyō may do this as many times as they wish, although it must only be done at the beginning of their turn. When the Daimyō gains territory they also gain the honor that territory provides, while if they lose a territory they lose any honor it provides.

Samurai honor may only be converted to Daimyō honor through a Tea Ceremony. The initiator (usually the Daimyō) must invite another player to the tea ceremony. If the other player agrees the initiator gives them 5 samurai honor. the tea ceremony initiator may then convert as much samurai honor as they wish to Daimyō honor, at a rate of two to one (i.e. 4 Samurai honor for 2 Daimyō). If the other player refuses, they lose 10 samurai honor as well as one Daimyō point for the disgrace. If players have less than 10 Samurai points they are not able to refuse a ceremony.

Once a Daimyō reaches 50 honor, they become the new emperor and win the game. Should no one reach this by the end of month 12, the Daimyō with the highest honor total wins.

== Strategy ==
The difficulty in Bushido is that all players are constantly regulating each other making it difficult to win. A samurai may throw a battle that would allow a Daimyō to win, while players may save their best effects for the crucial last couple months. Overall, players whom hope to win have to aim to do so suddenly and without appearing as a threat, or face the wrath of the other players. In this way Bushido favors a diplomatic player over a militaristic player.

== Sequels ==
Tanin the Stranger has recently been released in Europe as an expansion to the Bushido game.
