= Brain Chain =

Board game

- Publishers: Brain Chain Games, Inc.
- Genres: strategy, trivia, educational
- Players: 2–3 players or teams
- Setup time: 3 minutes
- Playing time: 30–90 minutes
- Chance: Low
- Age range: 8 +
- Skills: Abstract Strategy, Teamwork, General knowledge, Social Skills

Brain Chain is a strategy-driven trivia board game played by two or three players or teams. The object is to be the first player or team to connect an unbroken row of six "links" horizontally, vertically, or diagonally. The game is played on a 10x10 category grid surrounded by an exterior track. Brain Chain has been described as Trivial Pursuit with a Go-Moku win mechanic plus a dash of Pueblo added in.

Brain Chain was designed by Alicia Vaz and Scot Blackburn, who are Los Angeles attorneys, and Kris Harter, a graduate of Pacific Union College and a teacher at Loma Linda Academy. Roy Ice designed all of the graphics on the gameboard and box. Brigit Warner edited all of the trivia questions. Brain Chain is currently owned and distributed by Brain Chain Games, Inc.

Games Magazine has named Brain Chain a Top 100 Game.

== Gameplay ==
Before play begins, the players agree on the number of links necessary to win the game. A game of Brain Chain takes approximately 30 minutes if the goal is four links in a row, an hour if the goal is five links, or 90 minutes if the winning condition is a six-link chain.

Each turn begins with the playing of one movement card and as many Brain Pills as the player wishes and moving the playing pawn, clockwise, the corresponding number of spaces. All players move the same yellow playing pawn. If the pawn does not land on one of the four corner squares, the player then picks a trivia category from the same horizontal row or vertical column as the pawn that is not already occupied by a link. The opposing team will then read a trivia question from the selected category. The player may consult his or her team, but only the player whose turn it is may announce the "final answer." If answered correctly, that player places a link on the chosen square in the category grid and takes a Brain Pill.

If the pawn is moved to one of the four strategic corner squares, instead of picking a category on the row or column the pawn indicates, the player simply follows the instructions on that corner space: Pick any square on the board to answer a question, add a link, remove a link, or move a link.

To create a Brain Chain and win the game a player or team must form an unbroken line of six links in a row vertically, horizontally or diagonally on the Category Grid. The yellow playing pawn is considered a link during a player's turn—allowing a team to win by connecting five links on the border of the grid and moving the pawn to connect with those links.

== Trivia Questions and Answers ==
Each Brain Chain trivia set consists of approximately 3,200 trivia questions and answers which are divided among eight categories: Business, Entertainment, Geography, History, Science, Sports, Potluck and Oddball.

I.D.	Category Name	Types of Questions Asked
BIZ	Business	Mergers and acquisitions, stocks and bonds, money and currency, product lines, marketing, advertising slogans, accounting, finance, transportation, business law and management.
ENT	Entertainment	Movies, television, books, fine art, pop culture, media and news.
GEO	Geography	World and U.S. geography, people of the world, customs, languages and religions.
HIS	History	World and U.S. history, law, government, the military and politics.
SCI	Science	Inventors and inventions, anatomy, biology, chemistry, physics, weather, astronomy, space exploration, technology, nature, the environment, telecom, mathematics and psychology.
SPO	Sports	Vast array of questions covering professional, amateur, college, international or Olympic sports.
POT	Potluck	This is a random "catch-all" category and may include questions from any of the above categories or other general knowledge questions.
ODD	Oddball	Oddball questions are different from all of the above. Each Oddball question consists of four alternatives; three of them with some positive trait in common. The fourth one does not connect with the others. The answer identifies the one that does not fit with a brief explanation of the positive connection between the other three.
PLA	Player's Choice	Allows the player to choose from any of the above eight categories.
OPP	Opponent's Choice	Allows the player's opponent to choose the category of question asked.
