= 2006 in games =

This page lists board and card games, wargames, miniatures games, and tabletop role-playing games published in 2006. For video games, see 2006 in video gaming.

== Games released or invented in 2006 ==
- 24 DVD Board Game
- Against the Darkness (role-playing game)
- Alhambra: The Dice Game
- Apples to Apples Bible Edition
- Arkham Horror: Curse of the Dark Pharaoh Expansion
- Arkham Horror: Dunwich Horror Expansion
- Atmosfear: Khufu the Mummy
- Avatar: The Last Airbender Trading Card Game
- Axis & Allies: Battle of the Bulge
- Bananagrams
- BattleLore
- Battlestar Galactica Collectible Card Game
- Big Bang Comics (role-playing game)
- Bella Sara
- Bezzerwizzer
- Blokus Trigon
- Blue Moon - The Buka Invasion (expansion for Blue Moon)
- Blue Moon City
- Border Reivers
- Bully
- Burning Empires (role-playing game)
- Cadwallon (role-playing game)
- Capes & Cowls
- Carcassonne - The Tower
- Card Football Premiere Edition
- Christian Fluxx
- City of Heroes Collectible Card Game
- Classic BattleTech: Total Warfare
- Cleopatra and the Society of Architects
- Commands & Colors: Ancients
- Conan Collectible Card Game
- Cone of Fire
- Conquest of Pangea
- Crystalicum (role-playing game)
- d20 Dark•Matter (role-playing game)
- Dead Money
- Doctor Who - Battles in Time
- Dorn
- Draim arena
- Dungeon Twister - Mercenaires
- Dungeon Twister - Minotaur
- Dungeon Twister - Purple Dragon
- Dungeon Twister - À feu et à sang
- Dungeon Twister Collectors Box
- Elasund
- Eve: The Second Genesis Collectible Card Game
- Fluxx Español
- Fury of Dracula
- Gheos
- Gift Trap
- Great War at Sea: Jutland
- Great War at Sea: US Navy Plan Gold
- GridIron Master
- Gunslingers and Gamblers (role-playing game)
- Here I Stand
- High School Drama!
- Hordes
- HorrorClix
- Imperial (board game)
- Jewish Fluxx
- Khronos
- LOST Mystery Puzzle Game
- Luck of the Draw
- Die Macher
- Marvel Heroes
- Mojo
- Monopoly: The Mega Edition
- Munchkin Impossible
- Naruto Collectible Card Game
- Neuroshima Hex!
- Oshi
- Panzer Grenadier Airborne Introductory Edition
- Panzer Grenadier: Blue Division
- Panzer Grenadier: Red Warrioros
- Panzer Grenadier: Sinister Forces
- Pirate King
- Pirates of the Caribbean Trading Card Game
- Power Grid - Benelux/Central Europe
- Random Violence
- Rangers Strike
- Risk: Star Wars Original Trilogy Edition
- Robotech Collectible Card Game
- Shattered Empire
- Skullduggery
- Shogun
- Spirit of the Century (role-playing game)
- The Spoils
- Star Wreck Role-playing game
- Struggle for Rome
- Terra Nova
- Thurn and Taxis
- Ticket to Ride - Märklin Edition
- Ticket to Ride: USA 1910
- To Court the King
- Treehouse
- Universal Fighting System
- War of the Ring - Battles of the Third Age (expansion for War of the Ring)
- War on Terror
- WARMACHINE Prime Remix
- WARMACHINE: Superiority
- Warrior Knights
- Wild Talents (role-playing game)
- World of Warcraft Trading Card Game
- Xeko
- Yspahan
- Zombies!!! (Second Edition, originally released in 2001)
- Zombies!!! 5: School's Out Forever

== Game awards given in 2006 ==
- Spiel des Jahres: Thurn and Taxis
- Games: Vegas Showdown
- Imperial won the Spiel Portugal Jogo do Ano.

== Deaths ==
Date	Name	Age	Notability
March 8	Steve Henderson	~61	RPG designer
June 11	Tim Hildebrandt	67	illustrator
July 12	Kari Mannerla	76	Board and card game designer
September 25	John M. Ford	49	RPG designer, known for work on GURPS

== See also ==
- 2006 in video gaming
