= Going Cardboard =

- Directed by: Lorien Green
- Produced by: Lorien Green
- Edited by: Jason Scott Sadofsky
- Music by: Tony Longworth
- Release date: February 23, 2012
- Running time: 75 minutes
- Country: United States
- Language: English
- Budget: $5,000

Going Cardboard: A Board Game Documentary is a 2012 documentary about the American adoption of German-style board games, and includes coverage of the 2009 board game event Spiel in Essen, Germany, as well as interviews with many prominent game designers. The film was written, directed and produced by Lorien Green, who was introduced to board gaming by her husband. It was financed through the crowd funding service Kickstarter.

== Summary ==
Lorien Green shows how modern board games became popular in the United States. This includes interviews with influential game designers, fans, collectors, shop owners, specialized journalists and entrepreneurs who explain how, of all things, the internet promoted the success of non-digital games. It's been suggested that it's a useful tool to introduce newcomers to organized board gaming.

== Reception ==
The Geeks Playing Games website called it a "must see for anyone interested in the people behind the games and the process behind the production", although German newspaper Der Spiegel criticized it for being somewhat dated, as the film spent several years in post-production and only covers games up to 2009.

== Interviews ==
=== Designers ===
- Klaus Teuber (The Settlers of Catan)
- Reiner Knizia (Keltis)
- Alan R. Moon (Ticket to Ride)
- Friedemann Friese (Power Grid)
- Donald X. Vaccarino (Dominion)
- Nick Kellet (Gift Trap)
- Matt Leacock (Pandemic)
- Mac Gerdts (Imperial)
- Kory Heath (Zendo)
- Stephen Glenn (Balloon Cup)
- Christophe Boelinger (Dungeon Twister)
- Corey Konieczka (StarCraft: The Board Game)
- Bryan Johnson (Island Fortress)

=== Publishers ===
- Jay Tummelson (Rio Grande Games)
- Mark Kaufmann (Days of Wonder)
- Alexander Yeager (Mayfair Games)
- Zev "Z-Man" Shlasinger (Z-Man Games)
- Derk Solko (BoardGameGeek)
- Nick Medinger (Funagain Games)
