= Cronus (disambiguation) =

Cronus was the leader and the youngest of the first generation of Titans in Greek mythology, and the father of Zeus, Poseidon, Hades, Hestia, Demeter, and Hera.

Cronus may also refer to:

- Cronus (Stargate), a character in the science fiction television series Stargate SG-1
- Cronus, tarantula owned by British politician Gavin Williamson that led to Williamson being criticised by Parliamentary authorities when he brought it to the Houses of Parliament while serving as Chief Whip
- Cronus Ampora, a character from the webcomic Homestuck (2009-2016)
- Communications RF on board networks utilization specialist (CRONUS) for the International Space Station

== See also ==
- John Kronus, wrestler
- Kronus, where Warhammer 40,000: Dawn of War: Dark Crusade takes place
- Cronos (disambiguation)
- Chronos
- Khronos (disambiguation)
- Kronos (disambiguation)
