= Kronos (disambiguation) =

Kronos was the leader and youngest of the Titans.

Kronos may also refer to:

== Arts and entertainment ==
=== Film and television ===
- Kronos (film), a 1957 science fiction film
- Kronos (Highlander), a fictional character
- In the Doctor Who serial, The Time Monster, a creature from outside time that feeds on time itself
- In the Star Trek universe, another spelling of Qo'noS, the Klingon home world
- In Singularity, an artificial intelligence designed to rid the earth of the plague of humanity in order to save the planet
- In the Pixar film The Incredibles, "Kronos" is the name of villain Syndrome's master plan to eliminate all superheroes and become the world's only "super".

=== Video games ===
- Battle Worlds: Kronos, a 2013 video game
- In Age of Mythology: The Titans, a character with the ability to time-shift buildings
- In Eve Online, a Marauder Class battleship based on a Gallente Federation Megathron hull
- Kronos II, an Orbital Mining Facility on the rings of Saturn in 2126 in Lone Echo

=== Other media ===
- Kronos (band), a death metal band from France
- Kronos Quartet, a string quartet founded by violinist David Harrington in 1973
- Kronos (comics), a Marvel Comics character

== Businesses and organizations ==
- Kronos Digital Entertainment, a video game developer
- Kronos Incorporated, a workforce management software and hardware company
- Kronos Foods, a manufacturer of gyros
- Kronos International, a chemical company and producer of titanium dioxide based in Dallas
- Kronos Racing, a Belgian rally team

== Science and technology ==
=== Computing ===
- Kronos (computer), a 32-bit graphical workstation developed in the Soviet Union in the mid-1980s
- Kronos (malware), banking malware first reported in 2014
- CDC Kronos, an operating system with time-sharing capabilities, written by the Control Data Corporation in the 1970s

=== Other uses in science and technology ===
- Kronos (spacecraft), a proposed space mission to Saturn
- Kronos (star), a star that is in a wide binary system with Krios, and which has eaten some terrestrial planets
- Korg Kronos, a music workstation synthesizer

== Other uses ==
- Kronos: A Journal of Interdisciplinary Synthesis, published between 1975 and 1988

== See also ==
- Captain Kronos – Vampire Hunter, a 1974 horror film
- Khronos (disambiguation)
- Cronus (disambiguation)
- Chronos (disambiguation)
- Cronos (disambiguation)
