= Marvel Heroes =

Marvel Heroes may refer to:

- Marvel Heroes (board game)
- Marvel Heroes (video game)
- Marvel's ABC television series

== See also ==
- Marvel Super Heroes (disambiguation)
