= Chron =

Chron may refer to:

== Science ==
- Chronozone or chron, a term used for a time interval in chronostratigraphy
- Polarity chron or chron, in magnetostratigraphy, the time interval between polarity reversals of the Earth's magnetic field

== Other ==
- Chron (album), a 2014 album by Arve Henriksen
- Chron.com, a news website based in Houston, Texas.

== See also ==
- Chrono (disambiguation)
