= Axiom (game) =

Abstract three-dimensional board game

Box cover of second edition, 2008

Axiom is an abstract three-dimensional board game published in 1988 by Seventh Seal. A new edition was released by Abstract Planet twenty years later.

== Description ==
Axiom is a game in which two players move pieces (called Axioms and Sceptres) into a positional relationship with one of the pieces of their opponent.

=== Components ===
The game box contains twelve Axioms (cubes), six of each colour, and four Sceptres (pawns), two of each colour.

In the original 1988 edition, each player has

- two Axioms with one recessed face, while the other five faces have a pyramid, and
- two Axioms with two recessed faces, while the other four faces have a pyramid.

The pyramids mate with the recessed faces, and it is illegal to place two recessed faces against each other. The Sceptres are designed to only fit into the recessed faces.

In the 2008 edition, all pieces are joined magnetically rather than mechanically. Recessed faces now feature a concave hemisphere, while pyramids have been replaced by a convex hemisphere. Like the original edition, Sceptres only fit into the concave faces but cannot attached to the convex faces.

=== Setup ===
Each player constructs all of their pieces into a prescribed shape — or into a shape that both players can agree to, but both players must start with the same shape — and the two identical shapes are then placed next to each other.

=== Gameplay ===
The player playing the dark shape starts first, and play then alternates. The active player can move one of their pieces to any other location using the following guidelines:

==== Moving an Axiom ====
An Axiom cannot be moved if it has a Sceptre of either colour attached to it, nor if another Axiom is on top of it. Otherwise, the Axiom can be removed from the other game pieces, rotated to any new orientation and reattached to an Axiom of either colour, as long as the two pieces mate correctly, and the Axiom was not moved underneath another Axiom.

==== Moving a Sceptre ====
A Sceptre can be moved horizontally, diagonally or vertically as long as it moves over recessed faces — the Sceptre can only come to rest in a recessed face. A Sceptre cannot hop over another Sceptre, and therefore must stop if it runs into another Sceptre.

For a vertical move, the Sceptre moves over the edge of the Axiom and turns 90 degrees so that it is again perpendicular to the Axiom face. It can then continue in the same direction, even going over one or more edges, subject to the usual rules for moving Sceptres.

=== Eliminating pieces ===
If a Sceptre is on an opposing Axiom and moves onto an Axiom of its own colour, then the opposing Axiom is removed from the game unless the opposing Axiom is underneath another Axiom or if another Sceptre of either colour is attached to it.

=== Victory conditions ===
There are two ways to win a game:

- If a player moves their Sceptre onto an opposing Axiom that already has an opposing Sceptre attached to it, the player wins.
- If a player has no other option but to move one of their Sceptres onto an Axiom that already contains their other Sceptre, then the other player wins.

== New rule for 2008 edition ==
In the original 1988 edition, players could move an Axiom so that it was only touching another Axiom along a vertex. In the 2008 edition, this was modified so that an Axiom must be moved so that it fully mates with the face of another Axiom.

== Publication history ==
Axiom was created by British game designer Michael Seal and was published in 1988 by the British company Seventh Seal. At Spiel Essen 2008, Abstract Planet released an updated version of the game with slightly revised rules, featuring pieces that connected magnetically rather than mechanically.

== Reception ==
In Issue 7 of the British games magazine Games International, Eric Solomon was not enamoured of the original edition of the game, noting, "it is difficult to play well without a great deal of experience" Solomon concluded by giving the game a rating of 3 out of 5, saying "although I love abstract games and original abstract games in particular, I am not captivated by Axiom. However, there is no doubt that someone who played it regularly would discover subtleties which have escaped me."

Writing for Game Cabinet, Ken Tidwell liked the game, writing, "It's the first board game I've ever played that really made me think in three dimensions ... With Axiom I found myself envisioning the total space and manipulating that space in complex ways in my mind. ... The space has contours, obstacles, and just when you have it mapped out in your head it changes. Delightful!"

Writing for the German games website Cliquen Abend, Andreas Buhlmann reviewed the updated 2008 edition and warned potential players, "There is actually no luck factor in this game. It's all about hard-nosed calculations. There is certainly not much chatting during a game; you have to concentrate too hard and calculate the third dimension." Buhlman noted that some people would not like this game, writing, "Some people like it, others don't. Axiom is certainly not a game that will make you laugh, but that's not what it's designed for." Buhlman concluded, "No two games are the same. The beautiful futuristic design in conjunction with the feel and the magnets create an appealing atmosphere. I can warmly recommend Axiom to any abstract game lover. It offers a new element that will certainly satisfy your thirst for tactics and looks great as a decoration even when unplayed. However, if you prefer communicative games or don't like to think so much, you've come to the wrong place."
