= Mac Gerdts =

German board game designer

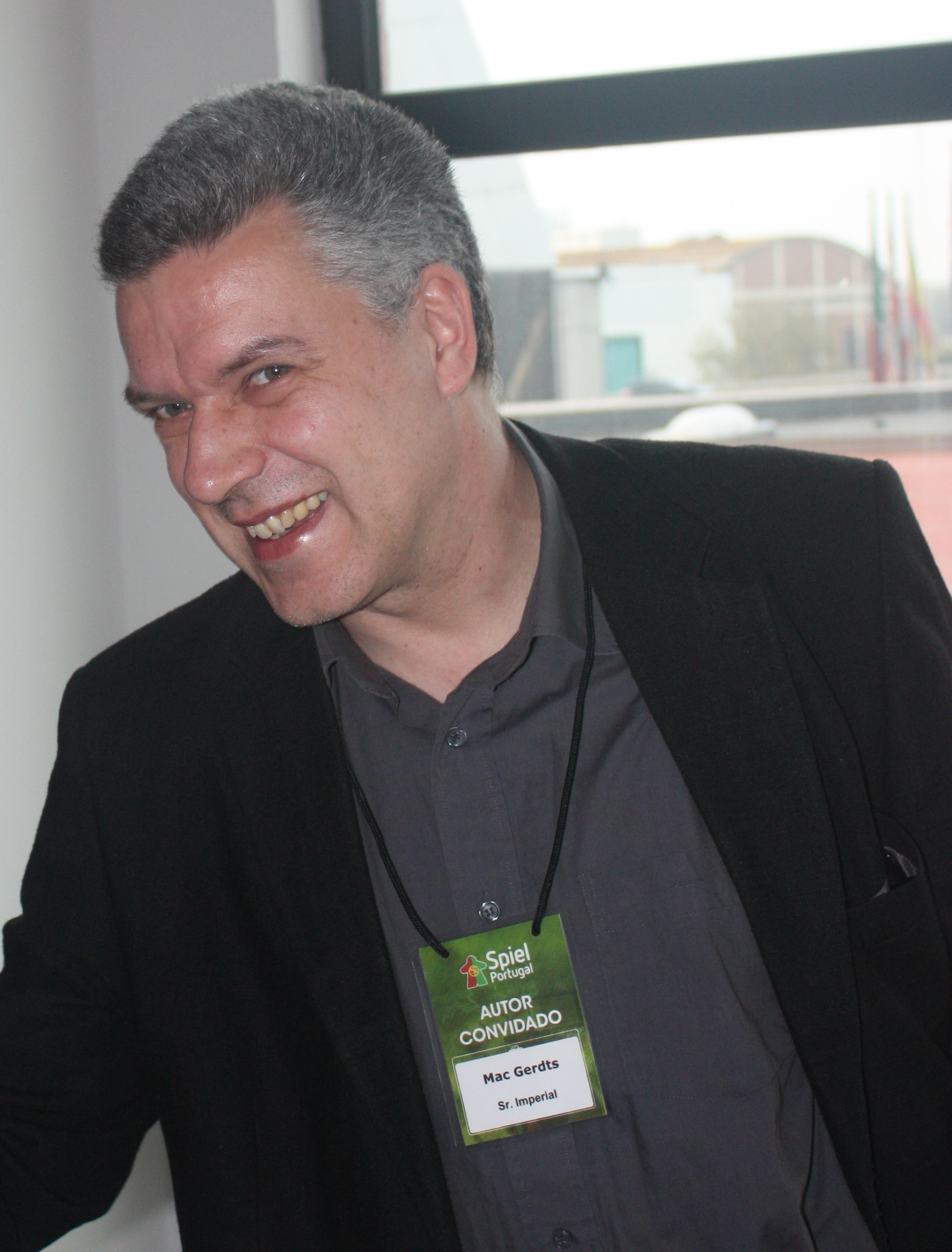
Mac Gerdts alla convention Play 2012, Modena

Walther M. Gerdts, known as Mac Gerdts, is the designer of German-style board games such as Imperial, Imperial 2030, Antike and Hamburgum. His games introduced the concept of a rondel rather than dice as a mechanism for play. This is designed to prevent players from repeatedly taking the same action in quick succession without paying a cost.

Like many German board games, all of Gerdts' games include a mechanism designed to keep game length roughly within the specified time constraint. In Imperial, the game ends when a nation reaches the 25-point on the counting chart. In Hamburgum, the game ends when six churches are constructed.

== Games ==
- 7 Empires, released in 2024, is a spiritual successor to Imperial and Imperial 2030, with players competing for power and influence in the Great Powers of 1700s Europe.
- Antike Duellum, released in 2012, is a two-player version of Antike.
- Antike II, released in 2014, is the follow-up of Antike, modified to make conquests easier while also allowing players to have possibilities of winning without necessarily attacking other players.
- Antike, released in 2005, is about evolution and competition among ancient civilizations.
- Concordia, a game released in 2013, about economics during the Roman Empire, is one of Mac's few games that does not employ a rondel. It was nominated for the 2014 Spiel des Jahres prize in the category Kennerspiel des Jahres (Connoisseur-Enthusiast Game of the Year).
- Hamburgum, released in 2007, is a game in which the object is to trade goods and make prestigious church donations. The spaces on the rondel are Church, Trade, Cloth, Guildhall, Beer, Dockyard, and Sugar.
- Imperial 2030, released in 2009, is a follow-up of Imperial, where USA, Europe, Russia, China, India and Brazil compete for world domination.
- Imperial, a 2006 game, has the players take on the roles of international investors in pre-World War I Europe.
- Navegador, released in 2010, is a game about the Golden Age of Portuguese Explorations.
- The Princes of Machu Picchu, released in 2008
- Transatlantic, a historic/economic game about industry exploration and naval transportation was presented at Essen Spiel 2014 and released in 2017.
