= Rondel (gaming) =

A rondel is a wheel-shaped game mechanism with a number of different options. A rondel game (or aspect of a game) is one where the player's choice of actions is limited by their ability to move around the rondel. This restricts the player from taking the same action repeatedly. The player is usually able to move further around the rondel by paying a cost.

The first implementation of a rondel system is by board game designer Mac Gerdts in his 2005 game Antike.

Other game designers have subsequently used the rondel system: Some notable examples are:

- Vikings (2007). Designer: Michael Kiesling.
- Finca (2009). Designers: Wolfgang Sentker and Ralf zur Linde.
- Trajan (2011). Designer: Stefan Feld.
- Empire Engine (2013) Designers: Matthew Dunstan and Chris Marling.
- Teotihuacan: City of Gods (2018) Designer: Daniele Tascini
- The Search for Planet X (2020). Designers: Matthew O'Malley and Ben Rosset.
- Tiny Epic Pirates (2021). Designer: Scott Almes.
- Planet Unknown (2022). Designers: Ryan Lambert and Adam Rehberg.

== See also ==
- Imperial
- Imperial 2030
