= Pirate King =

Pirate King may refer to:

== Fictional characters ==
- Elizabeth Swann, a character from the Pirates of the Caribbean franchise
- Gol D. Roger, a character known as Pirate King in One Piece
- Hondo Ohnaka, a character from the Star Wars franchise
- The Pirate King, a character in The Pirates of Penzance

== Music ==
- "The Pirate King", a song from The Pirates of Penzance and Disney's Pirates of the Caribbean: Swashbuckling Sea Songs
- "Pirate King", a song by the K-pop group ATEEZ from their 2018 album Treasure EP.1: All to Zero

== Other ==
- Pirate King (boardgame), a strategy boardgame
- Pirate King (novel), a 2011 novel by Laurie R. King
- The Pirate King, a 2008 novel by R. A. Salvatore

== See also ==
- King of Pirates Online, the Chinese title of the video game Tales of Pirates
