= Funagain Games =

American tabletop game retailer

Funagain Games is an American board game, card game, and table game retailer. The company sells online, and has physical locations in Ashland, Oregon and Eugene, Oregon.

Funagain carries a wide variety of games, but specializes in German-style board games and other imports. Some manufacturers say that Funagain holds a significant share of the online board game market because it reliably stocks the newest and most popular games, as well as the older, hard-to-find titles.

Founded in 1996, the company derived its name from its original (now discontinued) practice of collecting used copies and parts of old and out of print games from Goodwill and other donation centers. These incomplete sets were then combined into complete editions for re-sale.

With the success of The Settlers of Catan (Die Siedler von Catan) and other German games, Funagain began stocking new games both produced in the U.S. and abroad, especially German-style board games, the leaders in the industry. Company representatives annually attend the Internationale Spieltage SPIEL, a four-day game trade fair held in Essen, Germany each October to find imports not readily available in the U.S. Sometimes, this results in exclusive offers, such as Carcassonne: The Discovery and Havoc: The Hundred Years' War. These exclusive deals spark debate in the board-game industry.

While serious Eurogamers want the demanding games, the bulk of American game buyers look for easy-to-learn, fast-to-play games with a minimum of rules. As the New York Times reported, Funagain fills both needs because it "sells a comprehensive selection".

As a resource to gamers, Funagain hosts game reviewers, including Scott Nicholson's video game reviews, Tom Vasel's Dice Tower and Mike Siggins' U.K.-based games reviews, and lists the winners of Games magazine's Games 100 from 1980–present. Since 2008, Funagain has distributed and donated thousands of dollars' worth of games to people serving in the U.S. military, as well as deserving school and community organizations.

== See also ==
- Going Cardboard: A Board Game Documentary
