= Chronos (disambiguation) =

Chronos is the Greek personification of time.

Chronos may also refer to:

- Ancient name of a river, nowadays assumed to be Neman or Pregolya
- Chronos (character), name of two characters in the DC Comics universe
- Chronos (film), a 1985 IMAX film by Ron Fricke created with custom-built, time-lapse cameras
- Chronos (1987 video game), a shoot-em-up arcade game
- Chronos (2016 video game), a role-playing game for Oculus Rift
- Chronos (EP), an EP by Callejon
- Chronos (band), a Russian band
- A series of novels by Madeleine L'Engle, beginning with Meet the Austins
- chronos, the root password in ChromeOS

== See also ==
- Cronus, a Titan, father of Zeus in Greek mythology
- Chrono (disambiguation)
- Cronos (disambiguation)
- Khronos (disambiguation)
- Kronos (disambiguation)
