= The Castles of Burgundy =

2011 board game

- Box cover
- Designers: Stefan Feld
- Publishers: Ravensburger
- Players: 2 to 4
- Setup time: 15 minutes
- Playing time: 90 minutes
- Chance: Medium
- Age range: 12 and up
- Skills: Strategy

Related games
- The Voyages of Marco Polo, La Granja, Bora Bora

The Castles of Burgundy is a board game for two to four players, set in Medieval Burgundy. It was designed by Stefan Feld and illustrated by Julien Delval and Harald Lieske, and was published in 2011 by Ravensburger/alea. It is considered a classic of the Eurogame genre, and is cited as one of the most influential board games of the last decade. It uses dice rolling and dice placement, a modular setup, and set collection as its mechanics. The dice and the ability to change them give players a wide range of options.

== Gameplay ==
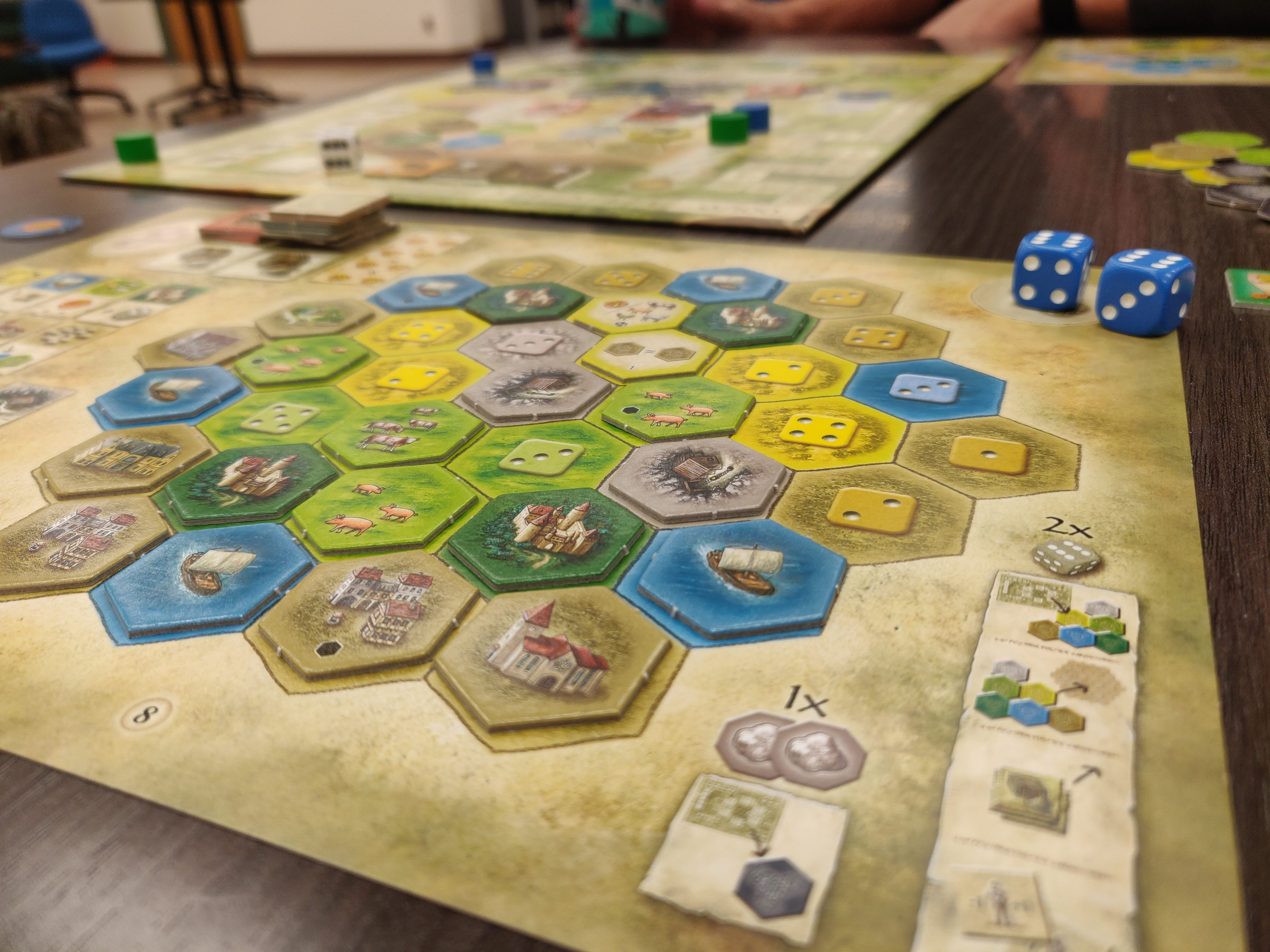
A player's board

In Castles of Burgundy, players collect hexagonal tiles to fill their personal player boards by drafting them via dice they've collected, and then gain benefits for each tile placed. Players will earn bonuses for filling in a specific region of their board, which is worth more points if done earlier in the game, or for filling all hexes of a specific color on their entire board.

The game takes place over phases, and within each phase, there are five rounds. The beginning of a phase starts by clearing the board of all existing hexagonal tiles, if any are present on the game board. This step is skipped in the first phase of the game. Next, players add new hexes to the six different depots by placing a hex type with the matching color in the depot, as well as refilling the black depot in the middle of the game board. Players will then take the goods pile that belong with the current phase they are in and place them face up on the spaces available.

Players will then take turns in a round, which starts by all players rolling their dice and the one white die, to place the good for the round in a depot based on the white die result, draft hexes from the game board and place hexes on the player boards based on the results of the player's dice, take two workers, manipulate dice results from gained workers, or buy hexes from the black depot. Players will continue this for five phases, until all the goods are placed on the game board. At the end of the fifth round in the fifth phase, players tally up their results and compare their scores. Whoever has the most points wins the game.

== Versions ==
In 2014 Yucata, the online game portal, released an online play-by-web version. In 2016 Ravensburger released Castles of Burgundy: The Card Game. Ravensburger also released a "roll-and-write" version, The Castles of Burgundy: The Dice Game, in 2017. In 2019 DIGIDICED developed versions for Steam, Android, and iOS. In 2023 Awaken Realms collaborated with Ravensburger and Alea to release Castles of Burgundy Special Edition, which added all new art and deluxe components for the base game and for nine of the existing expansions, as well as two new expansions, titled Vineyard and Shields.

== Reception ==
A review at Ars Technica described the game as having a "bland theme, dry artwork, chintzy components" but also "some of the best gameplay" in a board game and amongst the "best dice-rolling mechanics in any strategy game".

The Thoughtful Gamer's review of The Castles of Burgundy expressed that "[e]very part of it feels, at once, intentional and necessary..." and "precise, pleasant, and accessible."

One review for Castles of Burgundy Special Edition from Punchboard stated that it was "big, brash, and over the top, and it’s exactly what the game always needed."
