= Big Bang Comics (role-playing game) =

- Designers: Chris Carter (game designer)
- Publishers: Pisces All Media
- Publication: 2006
- Genres: Superhero
- Systems: d20 System

Big Bang Comics is a superhero tabletop role-playing game, written by Chris Carter and published by Pisces All Media in 2006. The game uses a modified version of the d20 System.

Characters in the game exist in either of the two worlds of Big Bang Comics (the Silver Age Earth-A or Golden Age Earth-B). Players may create new heroes or take the part of existing heroes from Big Bang Comics. Characters are created with two character classes: a power origin Entry Class, and a "civilian identity" representing their out-of-costume occupation. The power origin classes include choices such as Mutant, Elite (super-trained normal), Sorcerer, and Mechanical.

The game rules use standard d20 skills with a large range of original "Feats", which in Big Bang include super powers and other abilities. The game is also notable for using "Negative Feats", which functioned as disadvantages for a character, allowing more "Feats" to be chosen as a balance to defects. Although common in other roleplaying systems since the 1980s, this was unheard of in the d20 system and its derivations at that time.

Pisces announced free download-only ebook expansions to its system but to date none have been released.
