= War of the Ring (board game) =

Strategy board game

Box Art for War of the Ring, 1st edition (2004)

War of the Ring is a strategy board game based on The Lord of the Rings by J.R.R. Tolkien. The game was made by Roberto Di Meglio, Marco Maggi and Francesco Nepitello, first produced by Nexus Editrice (Italy), and is currently published by Ares Games.

Since its first print-run it has been produced in many languages: Fantasy Flight Games published the English edition in 2004. An expansion called Battles of the Third Age was released in 2006 and a Collector's Edition in 2010 (with both the base game and expansion materials, hand-painted miniatures, a leather-bound rulebook, and corrected and clarified rules and cards). The Fantasy Flight edition of both the base game and expansion are currently out of print. A new 2nd Edition, published by Ares Games, was published in 2011, as well as one expansion entitled Lords of Middle Earth and one called Warriors of Middle Earth, and a new expansion released in 2023 entitled Kings of Middle Earth.

== Gameplay ==
War of the Ring is a 2-player game that takes approximately 3 hours, though there are variant rules for 3 or 4 players where one or both sides play as a team. The game concerns the War of the Ring starting from the Fellowship's forming in Rivendell. One player controls the Shadow Armies and tries to conquer Middle-earth or to corrupt the Fellowship's Ringbearer. The other player controls the Free Peoples and tries to hold back the Shadow long enough to move the Fellowship into Mount Doom and destroy the Ring. A Free Peoples military victory is also possible, but the Shadow's power is overwhelming.

The board depicts northwestern Middle-earth, divided into territories. Some lands form nations while broad swatches sit unclaimed. The Free Peoples are the nations of Gondor and Rohan, the Elves (Rivendell, Lórien, the Woodland Realm, and the Gray Havens), the Dwarves (the settlements in Erebor, the Iron Hills and the Blue Mountains) and "The North" (the men of Dale, Carrock, and Bree, and the hobbits of the Shire). The Shadow Armies are Sauron (Mordor, Moria, Angmar and Dol Guldur), Isengard, and the combined Southrons and Easterlings.

== Reception ==
War of the Ring has generally been received very positively, for example with an 8.5/10 rating at BoardGameGeek from over 18,000 voters, enough to earn it the eighth-highest spot on the site's list of best board games. It has been described by reviewers as "quite simply a masterpiece" and "a remarkable game".

== Reviews ==
The game was reviewed in Realms of Fantasy.
