= Robin Spriggs =

American writer, actor, and poet

- Born: April 1, 1974 (age 52); Holy Ghost, New Mexico
- Occupations: Author; actor; poet; fabulist; magician; screenwriter; producer; occultist
- Writing career
- Period: Present
- Genres: Fantastique, magic realism, poetry, prose poetry, metafiction, supernatural fiction, dark fantasy
- Notable works: The Untold Tales of Ozman Droom; Diary of a Gentleman Diabolist; Wondrous Strange
- Website: robinspriggs.com

Robin Spriggs is an American writer, actor, and poet. Known primarily as a dark fabulist, he is the author of The Untold Tales of Ozman Droom, Diary of a Gentleman Diabolist, and Wondrous Strange: Tales of the Uncanny.

== Early life and education ==
Robin Spriggs was born in Holy Ghost, New Mexico. He holds degrees in both English and theatre.

== Career ==
Spriggs is known for his works The Untold Tales of Ozman Droom; Diary of a Gentleman Diabolist; Wondrous Strange.

He is the co-author of The Dracula Poems: A Poetic Encounter with the Lord of Vampires and the creator of Capes & Cowls: Adventures in Wyrd City, a "book-in-a-box" superhero board game based on his illustrated series, Capes & Cowls: The Wyrd City Chronicles.

As an actor, Spriggs is best known for his portrayal of Morrison, aka The Ghost, on the second season of PlayStation Network's superhero crime series, Powers, based on the comic book by Brian Michael Bendis and Michael Avon Oeming. Spriggs has also appeared as Captain Franco in the NBC science-fiction series Revolution; as Chris Amante in the USA Network drama series Necessary Roughness; and as Harley in The CW TV miniseries Containment. He also appeared in the 2004 film Sinkhole.

== Critical reception ==
The literary offerings of Robin Spriggs have been well received by critics. Publishers Weekly, in its review of The Untold Tales of Ozman Droom, observed, "Spriggs evokes terror and awe," and "Medium is the message in this dazzling anti-story, a love letter to the weird."

Rue Morgue declared The Untold Tales of Ozman Droom "A hard-to-describe yet highly entertaining compilation... an experience weird fiction fans should not pass up."

According to Cemetery Dance magazine, "Spriggs displays a wide range of talents in both form and substance. He's equally comfortable in the short story, short-short and novella lengths."

Much of Spriggs' work falls into the category of prose poetry, prompting thriller author Harry Shannon to refer to him as "a linguistic acrobat who works without a net."

Noted editor and anthologist Ellen Datlow, in volume 3 of her The Best Horror of the Year, wrote: "Diary of a Gentleman Diabolist by Robin Spriggs is a series of well-wrought interconnected prose poems of the ghostly and uncanny."

== Recognition and awards ==
Spriggs has been nominated for a Pushcart Prize, a Bram Stoker Award, a Rhysling Award, and received honorable mention in The Year's Best Fantasy and Horror.

His fiction and poetry have appeared in such publications as Beyond, The Rhysling Anthology, Cemetery Dance, Going Postal, Space & Time, Terminal Fright, A Season in Carcosa, and the Shirley Jackson Award-winning anthology The Grimscribe's Puppets.

== Selected works ==
- The Dracula Poems: A Poetic Encounter with the Lord of Vampires (1992)
- Wondrous Strange: Tales of the Uncanny (2001)
- Capes & Cowls: Adventures in Wyrd City (2006)
- Diary of a Gentleman Diabolist (2010)
- The Untold Tales of Ozman Droom (2014)
