= Stefan Feld =

German-style board game designer

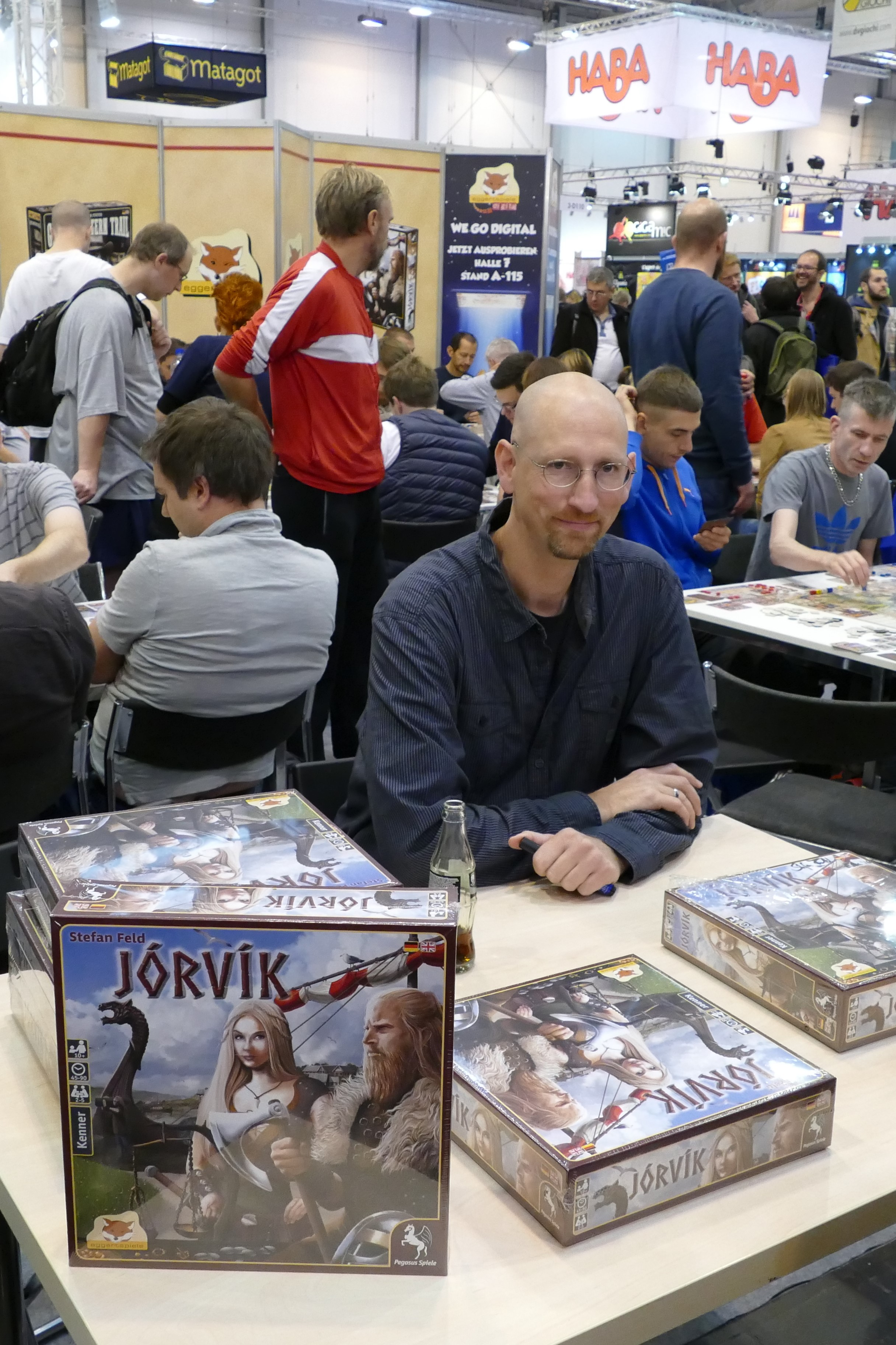
- Feld at Spiel 2016
- Born: 1970 (age 55–56); Karlsruhe, Germany
- Occupations: Teacher, principal, game designer
- Website: spiele-feld.de

Stefan Feld (born 1970 in Karlsruhe, Germany) is a German-style board game designer who lives in Gengenbach, Baden-Württemberg, Germany.

Feld is considered one of the most prominent designers of the Eurogame genre. He is particularly known for the ingenious use of dice in his games, using them to add variety and different options without excessive randomness. Three of the games he has designed, Strasbourg, Bruges, and Carpe Diem have been nominated for the prestigious award Kennerspiel des Jahres in Germany. Many of his games feature artwork from game artist Harald Lieske.

== Games designed by Stefan Feld ==
- Roma (2005)
- Rum and Pirates (2006)
- In the Year of the Dragon (2007)
- Notre Dame (2007)
- The Name of the Rose (2008)
- Arena: Roma II (2009)
- Macao (2009)
- The Pillars of the Earth: Builders Duel (2009)
- Luna (2010)
- The Speicherstadt (2010)
- Spiel mit Lukas: Dribbel-Fieber (2010)
- It Happens (2010)
- The Castles of Burgundy (2011)
- Strasbourg (2011)
- Trajan (2011)
- Kaispeicher (2012)
- Bora Bora (2013)
- Rialto (2013)
- Bruges (2013)
- Amerigo (2013)
- La Isla (2014)
- Aquasphere (2014)
- The Castles of Burgundy: The Card Game (2016)
- Jórvík (2016)
- The Oracle of Delphi (2016)
- Merlin (2017)
- Carpe Diem (2018)
- Forum Trajanum (2018)
- Bonfire (2020)
- Kokopelli (2020)
- The Castles of Tuscany (2020)
- Hamburg (re-implementation of Bruges) (2021)
- Amsterdam (re-implementation of Macao) (2021)
- New York City (re-implementation of Rialto) (2022)
- Marrakesh (2022)
- Vienna (re-implementation of La Isla) (2023)
- Cuzco (re-implementation of Bora Bora) (2023)
- Civolution (2024)
- The Druids of Edora (2025)
