= Trajan (board game) =

Board game introduced in 2011

- Designers: Stefan Feld
- Players: 2-4
- Setup time: 10-15 minutes
- Playing time: 1-2 hours
- Chance: Low
- Skills: Strategic thought

Trajan is a board game designed by Stefan Feld and first introduced in 2011 by German publisher Ammonit Spieleverlag. The game takes place in ancient Rome where players try to seize opportunities in business and politics to advance their personal status. It features a mancala-style mechanism named «rondel» that each player uses to select an action during their turn.

== Gameplay Overview ==
The game is set in 110AD with players trying to score victory points in a series of six different "tactical facilities" determined by the mancala-style mechanism. Each section of the mancala determines an action the player may take in its respective area. An additional 'Trajan' tile sits aside every section of the mancala that may be claimed should its conditions be met, gaining the player victory points and a special ability.
