= GridIron Master =

Football-themed board game

- GridIron Master playing surface
- Players: 2-4
- Setup time: Less than 5 minutes
- Playing time: 90-120 minutes
- Chance: Low
- Age range: 10 years and up
- Skills: Some knowledge of American and/or Canadian football

GridIron Master is a wooden board game invented by Brett Proud, Craig Proud, Paul Morin and Jordan Sampson. It was first published by Canadian company PHI Sports Games in 2007. It combines the strategic elements of gridiron football (American and Canadian football) with chess. The Canadian Edition of GridIron Master is licensed by the Canadian Football League Players' Association (CFLPA).

== Information ==
The GridIron Master board is a scale model of a real football field (American football field and Canadian football field). It is a combination of the skill and strategy of football and chess that is for ages ten and up. As of 2013, the average price for both the American and Canadian versions of the game is about $30.

== Components ==
The game includes the following components:

- One exact-to-scale football field that serves as the playing board
- Two Player Benches (one each for the Home and Visitors teams)
- Two sets of 20 Player Pieces (for the Home and Visitors teams) each consisting of:
- 5 Offensive Linemen
- 4 Defensive Linemen
- 3 Tight Ends / Outside Linebackers
- 6 Wide Receivers / Defensive Backs
- 1 Slotback / Safety
- 1 Quarterback / Middle Linebacker
- Four Flat-piece Footballs
- Four Football-shaped Dice
- Two Dice Sheets
- Sample Offensive and Defensive Formations
- One football-shaped Coin
- One GridIron Master Scoreboard
- One GridIron Master Game Guide

== Game play ==
For a regular game, each quarter of the game is defined to be two total ball possessions for either team. For a timed game, each half is to be played over one hour. It is recommend a 20-second play-clock be used. Each player is given three timeouts per half. Timeouts are supposed to last a maximum of three minutes. A 'Delay of Game' penalty of five yards will be called on any player taking longer than twenty seconds to make their next move. This penalty should be added to the end of the play.
