= Kronos (spacecraft) =

Kronos is a concept mission to Saturn. It is aimed at detailed study of the chemical composition of Saturn's atmosphere, gravity and magnetic fields. The proposal consists of the solar powered carrier spacecraft, two atmospheric probes and (possibly) two small probes for the close-up imaging of the Saturnian rings.

== History ==
Kronos was proposed in 2009 as a collaboration between NASA and ESA.

After the launch and several flybys of Venus, Earth and Jupiter, Kronos would arrive at Saturn. The cruise time depends on chosen trajectory and is from 6 to 17 years. In the vicinity of Saturn two atmospheric probes are to be released, entering the atmosphere of Saturn and obtaining information on chemical composition (including isotopic ratios), temperature, wind speeds and cloud structure to pressures down to 10 bars.

Two rings probes, if implemented, would also be released in order to provide images of ring particles from a very close distance (a few kilometers). The carrier spacecraft is proposed to fly by Saturn at a close distance obtaining precision information on the gravitational and magnetic fields of Saturn as well as on the atmospheric circulation and deep composition of the atmosphere.

The carrier spacecraft design closely follows that of Jupiter orbiter Juno including solar panels. The proposed design of the descent probes would be similar to that of Galileo's atmospheric entry probe. The mission would be generally based on existing technology.
