= Conquest of Pangea =

Board game

- Designers: Philip Orbanes
- Publishers: Winning Moves
- Players: 2 - 4
- Setup time: 15 minutes
- Playing time: 60 - 90 minutes
- Chance: Medium - High
- Age range: 12 and up
- Skills: Planning; Risk Analysis

Conquest of Pangea is a strategy board game published by Winning Moves in 2006 where players control different species battling to dominate sections of the mega-continent Pangea.

== Description ==
Conquest of Pangea is a board game of world domination for 2–4 players. The game board is made up of seven continents, which, at the start of the game, are all joined together as the supercontinent Pangea. Each continent is subdivided into several areas. Each player controls a different species of animal, all being equal in ability, with no advantages over other species.

=== Setup ===
Each player in turn:

1. Draws a time card, which indicates one of the continents.
2. Claims an area on that continent by placing one of their population markers on it.
3. Draws a terrain card to be placed in that area.
4. Draws a dominance card that corresponds to the type of terrain played. If the dominance card is volcano or sulfur, the player does not add it to their hand; rather it is placed on the area, making it uninhabitable, and the player must take back the population marker.

This cycle continues until all 25 areas of the game board are either claimed or have been marked as uninhabitable.

=== Gameplay ===
The first player is given five "power points". The player spends these points to take different actions, such as increasing the units in a controlled area, moving to an area they control, and battling with an opponent for control of an adjacent area. When a player gains control of two or more areas with a similar terrain type, their species gains a new power, represented on a power card. Additionally, a player gains power cards based on the actions performed during the turn. These power cards can be used to help in battles or to gain additional "power points" towards more actions on a turn. Having the most population counters in an area earns a dominance card, which has a number of victory points.

At the end of their turn, the player flips over an event card and determines what event occurs as well as how much time has passed. Once the action is resolved, the event card is placed in a row and the total amount of time on the event cards in the row is added together. If this totals 25 million or more, the piece of the continent shown on the last event card breaks away from Pangea. A player cannot migrate a leader or population marker to the breakaway continent unless they have a raft, provided by certain time cards or one of the power cards.

=== Victory conditions ===
When all the continents have separated, the game is over. The player with the most dominance card victory points is the winner.

== Publication history ==
Conquest of Pangea was designed by Philip Orbanes and was published by Winning Moves in 2006. That same year, Winning Moves published an expansion, Conquest of Pangea: Atlantis that added a new subcontinent, a new terrain type and a new Power card.

== Reception ==
Centurion's Review found some of the rules ambiguous — for example, the rulebook does not indicate if aa population marker eliminated by combat is removed from the game, or returned to the owning player. The biggest complaint was that there are many situations where a player cannot do anything during their turn, which occurs when the only space available for migration is on a subcontinent that has drifted away, leaving as the player's only recourse to draw cards hoping for a raft.

Bruce Whitehill called this game much simpler than its suggested 90-minute playing time would suggest. Whitehill did point out that luck plays an important part of the setup, and "could effect the game dramatically in favor of one player." Whitehill liked "the element of the gameboard beginning as one large land mass, then changing as the game progresses, as each continent separates." Whitehill concluded, "the key to the game is in dominating the best terrain as these land shifts occur."

== Other reviews and commentary ==
- Knights of the Dinner Table #142
