= Marvel Super Heroes =

Marvel Super Heroes may refer to:

- Marvel Super-Heroes (comics), several Marvel Comics publications
- Marvel Super Heroes (video game), a 1995 arcade game
- Marvel Super Heroes in War of the Gems, a 1996 platform game
- Marvel Super Heroes (role-playing game), a 1984 role-playing game
- Marvel Super Heroes Adventure Game, a 1998 role-playing game
- The Marvel Super Heroes, a 1960s animated television series
- The Mighty World of Marvel, a 1972 UK comics series which was renamed Marvel Superheroes from 1979 to 1983
- Lego Marvel Super Heroes, a 2013 video game based on the Lego franchise

== See also ==
- List of Marvel Comics characters
