= Bezzerwizzer =

Board game

The game of trivia, tactics and trickery
- Cover Image
- Manufacturers: Asmodee, Bezzerwizzer Nordic Aps
- Designers: Jesper Bülow
- Years active: 2006–present
- Players: 2–4 teams
- Setup time: 5 minutes
- Playing time: 45 minutes
- Chance: Low – Moderate (Question Categories)
- Age range: Aimed at 15+
- Skills: General knowledge, tactics
- Website: http://www.bezzerwizzer.co.uk/

Bezzerwizzer is a trivia game based on answering questions belonging to a number of categories drawn at the beginning of the game. The game was invented in 2006 by the Dane Jesper Bülow. The game's name is a pun on "Besserwisser", a German term meaning "better knowing" or a "know-it-all".

Bezzerwizzer Nordic, the publisher of the Bezzerwizzer board games, was founded in Denmark in 2006. Since then, the company has published numerous quiz and party games, selling nearly 4 million games by 2021

Bezzerwizzer was first published in Denmark in 2006. In 2007, the game was launched in Germany in association with Mattel, and in 2008 Bezzerwizzer Nordic released the game in Sweden and Norway. Mattel has released versions for the United Kingdom, France, Germany, and the United States. Bezzerwizzer Nordic has also launched the game in Finland, The Netherlands and Belgium. In Spain, the company Falomir Juegos released the Spanish version in 2016.

The game is currently available in Denmark, Norway, Sweden, Iceland, Germany, Poland, the Netherlands and the UK.

Based on the publisher’s success, in 2019, Bezzerwizzer Nordic is acquired by the global board game distributor Asmodee Group. Asmodee has offices in a large number of countries and currently distributes board games in over 50 markets.

== Gameplay ==
Bezzerwizzer Tiles

=== Question types ===
The questions are divided into 20 different categories, each built upon different topics (in alphabetical order):

- Architecture (Buildings, Architects and Architectural styles)
- Art & Stage (Classical music, Theatre, Paintings and Sculptures)
- Business (Companies, Businesspeople and Products)
- Celebrities (Musicians, actors, sports people and media stars)
- Design (Fashion, Furniture, Interiors, Designers and logos)
- Film (Actors, Directors, titles and film quotes)
- Food & Drink (Gastronomy, Chefs, restaurants and cookbooks)
- Geography (Countries, Cities, Oceans, Rivers, Lakes and Mountains)
- History (Historical figures, Places and Events)
- Language (Foreign languages, grammar, Idioms and Sayings)
- Literature (Titles, Authors, Literary Characters)
- Music (Artists, Albums, Songs and Lyrics)
- Nature (Animals, Plants, geology and the Environment)
- Politics (Politicians, Parties and Forms of Government)
- Science (Physics, Chemistry, Mathematics, Astronomy, Anatomy and medicine)
- Society (Organisations, institutions, legislation and media)
- Sport (Athletes, Disciplines, Events and Records)
- Technology & Games (Technology, IT, inventions and gaming)
- Television (Programmes, Series, roles and hosts)
- Tradition & Beliefs (Religion, Mythology, Customs and Legends)

=== Setup ===
Players are split up into teams, most of the time playing separately. Each team selects a playing piece and takes two Bezzerwizzer tiles (denoted by the letter B) and one ZWAP (denoted by the letter Z) tile of the same color.

Each team then draws four category tiles at random from the bag, and places them on their tile board in order of preference. Each question has a point value determined by the number of dots above it. For example, a team may pick the tiles Music, Film, Nature and Politics. If they are confident at getting a question in one subject right they would put it on the fourth square on the board (scoring four points for a correct answer). There is no obvious varying difficulty between questions.

The team that plays first is chosen randomly – going first has no real advantage.

=== Play ===
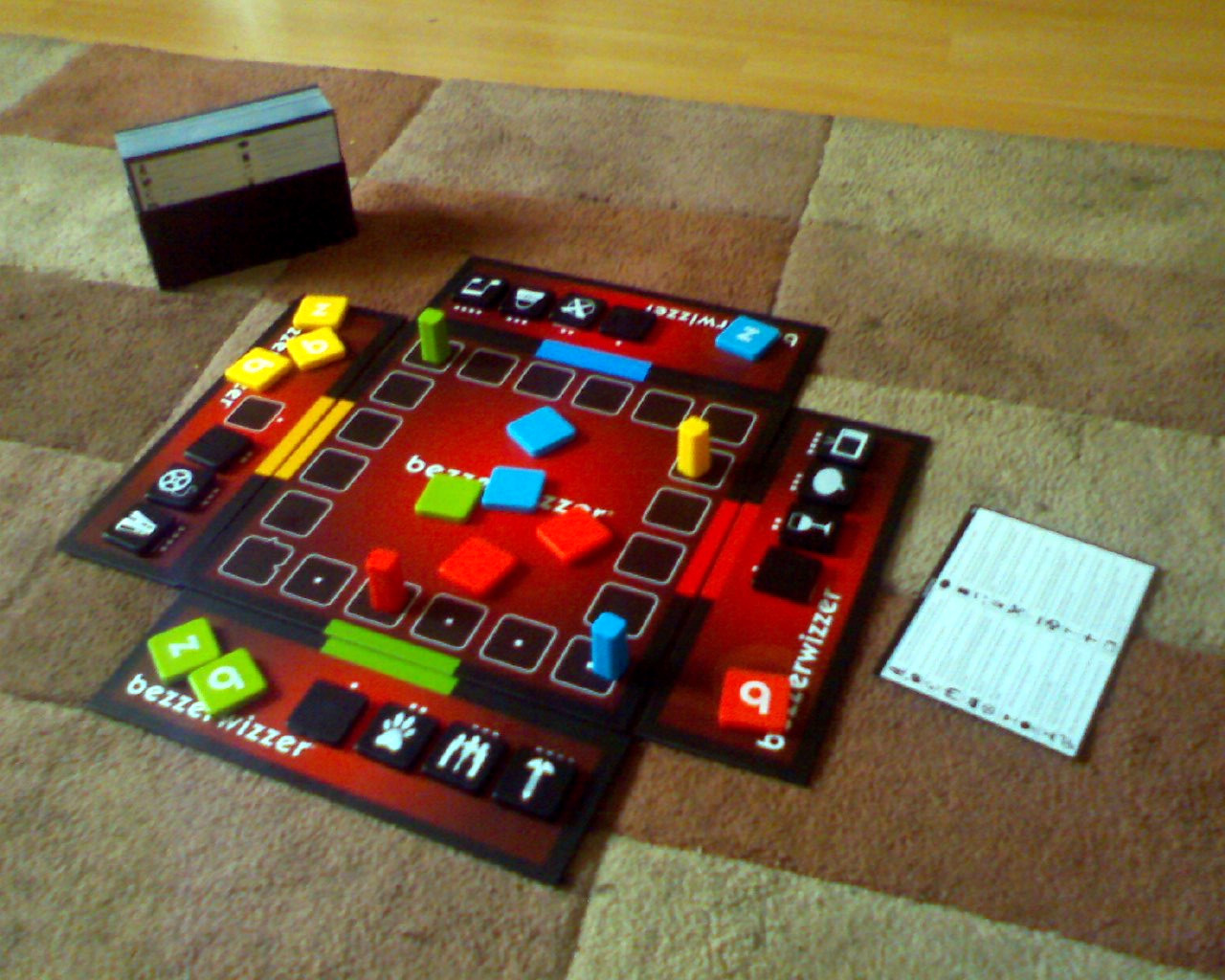
The Bezzerwizzer Game Board

For every point scored a team moves forward one square.

Play goes in a clockwise direction from the team who plays first. The team will be asked their one-point question first based on the topic they put on their board. The team answers the question and score the corresponding number of points if they answer correctly. An incorrect answer has no penalty. During their team's turn a team may use their ZWAP tile. This allows this team to swap any two tiles (once those questions haven't been asked in that round). They may swap two tiles between any two teams or swap the two tiles of the same team (including their own) to produce a different order. Teams may play one tile during a round.

After all questions have been asked once – this will be 16 questions if four teams are playing – the round ends. The game continues as normal after four category tiles are picked again.

=== Endgame ===
The first team to reach the finish is the winner, unless another team also reaches the finish in the same round. If two or more teams finish in the same round, then sudden death occurs. For each sudden-death round, each team draws one category tile from the bag and gets a single question on that. Teams remain in sudden death for every round that they answer correctly or when all teams answer that round of questions incorrectly. The last team remaining in sudden death is declared the winner.

If a team is situated on the home stretch (within the last five squares of the board), another team may force them to go backwards. The attacking team does this by playing a Bezzerwizzer tile. If the attacking team answers the question correctly and the defending team does not, it may choose to move the defending team's piece backwards (the same number of points) instead of moving their own forward.
