= Gunslingers and Gamblers =

2006 video game

- Cover
- Designers: Jonathan Clarke
- Publishers: FJGaming
- Publication: 2006
- Genres: Western, Indie
- Systems: Streamline, Custom

Gunslingers and Gamblers (G&G) is an indie roleplaying game written by Jonathan Clarke and published by FJGaming.

The game is set in the American Wild West of 1876. There are two versions of the game using different rules: a Streamline edition which uses 10-sided dice (a d100 system as first seen in Privateers and Pirates) and a version with a custom ruleset using poker dice. The mechanics of the streamline edition are similar to conventional role playing games but the use of poker dice gives a period flair to the regular edition of the game.
