= Chrono =

Chrono may refer to:

== Prefix ==
chrono- relating to time

- chronometry, science of the measurement of time
- "chrono", colloquialism for chronograph in watch and clock collectors' language

== Games ==
- Chrono (series), a Japanese video game series, which includes:
  - Chrono Trigger
  - Radical Dreamers
  - Chrono Cross
  - Crono (Chrono Trigger), the main character in Chrono Trigger

== Books ==
- Chrono, a character in the Kurt Vonnegut novel The Sirens of Titan
- Chrono, the title character from the manga and anime Chrono Crusade
- Chrono Harlaown, from list of Magical Girl Lyrical Nanoha characters
- Chrono Press, one of myriad imprints of the German group OmniScriptum devoted to the reproduction of Wikipedia content

== Music ==
- Chrono, a 2011 EP by Paul Kalkbrenner
- "Chrono", a song by The Ghost Inside from the 2010 album Returners
- "Chrono", a song by Kraftwerk from the 2003 album Tour de France Soundtracks

== Other uses ==
- Chrono Aviation, a Canadian charter airline based in Québec City

== See also ==
- Chronos
- Chronos (disambiguation)
