= Christophe Boelinger =

French game designer

Christophe Boelinger is a prolific game designer and game artist from France. His most famous game is Dungeon Twister. Boelinger is credited as the designer of over 60 board games or game items. He is known as a fan of theme, unique styles, and fantasy settings, stating that he always searches for the theme of a game first except for abstract games.

Games that Boelinger has designed or co-designed include the following:

- 2000 Halloween Party (2000 Concours International de Créateurs de Jeux de Société, winner)
- 2001 A Dog's Life, a very thematic roll-and-move game about dogs
- 2002 Fantasy Business, players manage shops to sell fantasy equipment
- 2004 Dungeon Twister (2005 International Gamers Award for General Strategy, 2-Player category, winner)
- 2005 Miss Monster with Ludovic Maublanc (2005 Kinderspielexperten for 8-to-13-year-olds, 2nd place)
- 2006 Faerie Tales, a strategy and fantasy board game
- 2010 Earth Reborn (2011 International Gamers Award for General Strategy, 2-Player category, nominee)
- 2011 Sarena, an abstract strategy and bluffing game
- 2012 Archipelago (2012 Swiss Gamers Award, Game of the Year)
- 2013 Dungeon Twister: The Card Game, a two-player-only version of Dungeon Twister using only cards
- 2016 4 Gods, a real-time tile-laying and world-creating game

In 1998, Boelinger won the Simulation Game award with his unreleased game Grande Surface in the Boulogne-Billancourt Game Designers Contest. He started designing games around the age of seven or eight with no intention of becoming a game designer. In Nice, France, Boelinger had a very large gaming club whose members encouraged him to get some his prototype games published. He has also run his own game publishing company with Ludically, although he had his games published by companies from several different countries. Some of his favorite games have included Go, Dungeons & Dragons, and Magic: The Gathering. Boelinger is also known for being an active sportsman, dancer, and singer.
