= Imperial (board game) =

Board game designed by Mac Gerdts

- The Imperial playing board
- Designers: Mac Gerdts
- Publishers: Rio Grande Games; PD-Games; Eggert-Spiele
- Players: 2–6
- Setup time: 10 minutes
- Playing time: 120 minutes
- Chance: None
- Age range: 12 and up

Imperial is a German-style board game designed by Mac Gerdts in which the object is to accumulate wealth in the form of bond holdings in successful countries and cash. Players take on the role of international financiers who purchase government bonds in the six pre-World War I empires of Austria-Hungary, France, Germany, Great Britain, Italy, and Russia. The principal bondholder of a nation gains control of its government and can order importation or production of armaments and ships; maneuvering of military units; construction of factories; and taxation. During play, an investor card is passed around which allows the purchase of additional bonds. A rondel – a wheel-shaped game mechanism with eight different options – is used to determine the options available to a country. The game box states that it is for 2–6 players, but a developer-supported variant allows play with seven. Imperial 2030 is a follow-up game released in 2009 with similar mechanics.

== History and development ==
Imperial was first published in 2006 in Germany. It was then translated into English and exported to the United States. In 2007, Imperial was nominated as a Spiel des Jahres recommended game.

As of 2012, a third version of the game has been released that is somewhat different from the original. There is a 30 mil bond and the notion of a "Swiss Bank" for players not governing a nation.

== Gameplay ==
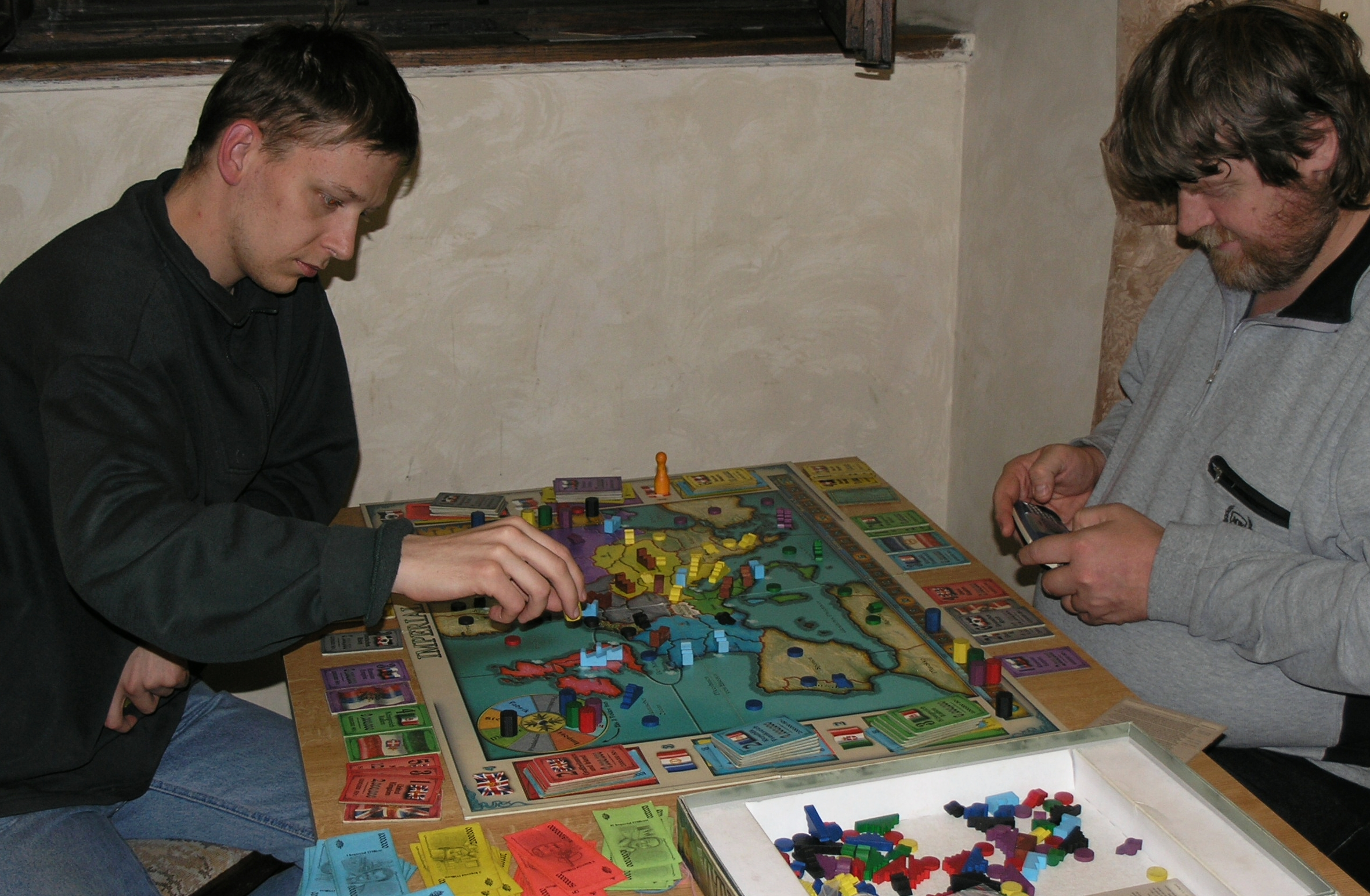
Imperial

The players of Imperial are wealthy banking families who surreptitiously control and exploit European governments from behind the scenes. Control of the majority of a country's debt allows the player to control the country's actions. A key element of the game is separating the player's money from each country's treasury. Country's treasuries gain money from taxation, which increases based on how much territory the country controls, and from players buying bonds from that country. Players gain money by earning success bonuses from countries they control, earning 2,000,000 when the investor card they hold is activated, and most importantly from dividends of bonds they've previously purchased. Thus, gaining player money can be a two-step process – one must first buy a country's bonds, then get that money out of the country and into their own pocket by forcing the country to constantly pay interest/dividends on the loaned money. A country only spends money on two other things – importing military units (1M apiece) and building factories (5M apiece), so most money put into a treasury becomes available to pay back to investors. Money left in a country's treasury at the end of the game does not count toward helping any player win.

In the taxation phase, a country's treasury receives 2M for each unoccupied factory, plus 1M for each tax chip, minus 1M for each military unit. The country's octagonal game piece is moved to the appropriate number on the power chart, and if the country has moved up on the tax chart, a success bonus is paid to the player who holds that country's flag. When a country reaches 25 points on the counting chart, the game ends.

Players' bond holdings in each country are public knowledge; current cash on hand is allowed to be kept secret.

=== Military units ===
Military units move in a (somewhat) similar manner as in Diplomacy. Armies can be transported over bodies of water by convoys. Fleets and armies destroy each other in a one-to-one ratio. Fleets are always moved first; then armies. Each imperial power has a railroad network within its borders by which its armies can rapidly deploy to the battlefield. For example, in one turn, Germany can move a fleet into the North Sea, and then move an army from Munich to Norway by (1) traveling from Munich to Hamburg by railroad, and then (2) traveling from Hamburg to Norway by convoy. In Germany's next turn, that army can make the return trip by the same means. Chains of fleets in contiguous ocean territories can transport armies over long distances in one turn, but each fleet can only carry one army per turn.

Armies traveling through other empires can be either passive or hostile. A hostile army is placed upright and a passive army is placed on its side. Hostile armies shut down the occupied province's factories and railroads and prevent imports and factory construction in that province. The rules do not allow opponents to occupy (or destroy) all of a country's factories, though. If a country is down to its last operating factory, then other countries' armies entering that province must be placed on their side as passive armies.

Three armies can destroy a factory (and themselves at the same time), but this is rarely done. A reason is that a player with three armies at his disposal has the alternative of shutting down three factories, which can immediately severely hamper an opponent's ability to raise funds and military units needed for a counterattack. To get back to full industrial capacity, the opponent must expend turns and armies destroying the occupying armies. Another disadvantage of destroying factories is that the three invading armies are lost, and therefore are unavailable to be recalled to defend the home country. An offer to withdraw occupying armies can be used as a bargaining chip to get a country to take a certain action. But when a factory has been destroyed, the invader has no way to undo the damage, and therefore has nothing to offer in bargaining (and is also three armies shorter).

The amount of military units available to the empires vary. Germany, Russia, Italy, and France get eight armies and eight fleets each. Austria-Hungary, however, gets ten armies and six fleets while Great Britain, on the other hand, gets ten fleets and six armies.

=== Game board ===
Each great power has five home provinces where factories can be built. There are fifteen other land regions and nine ocean regions. The regions that can be occupied are:

- Provinces: Dublin, Edinburgh, Liverpool, Sheffield, London; Brest, Paris, Dijon, Bordeaux, Marseille; Hamburg, Berlin, Danzig, Cologne, Munich; St. Petersburg, Moscow, Warsaw, Kiev, Odessa; Prague, Lemberg, Vienna, Budapest, Trieste; Genoa, Venice, Florence, Rome, and Naples.
- Land regions: Spain, Portugal, Morocco, Algeria, Tunisia, Belgium, Holland, Denmark, Norway, Sweden, West Balkan, Greece, Romania, Bulgaria, and Turkey.
- Ocean regions: Baltic Sea, North Sea, North Atlantic, English Channel, Bay of Biscay, Western Mediterranean Sea, Ionian Sea, Eastern Mediterranean Sea, and Black Sea.

Switzerland is a neutral country that cannot be occupied. Along the right side of the board is the power chart. Along the bottom is the counting chart. Once any country reaches 25 points on the counting chart, the game ends.

=== Bonds ===
In the original version, each country has eight bonds. In the third and latest version of the game, a ninth bond was added. The current bond values are as follows:

Value	Cost	Payout
1	2,000,000	1,000,000 (50%)
2	4,000,000	2,000,000 (50%)
3	6,000,000	3,000,000 (50%)
4	9,000,000	4,000,000 (44%)
5	12,000,000	5,000,000 (42%)
6	16,000,000	6,000,000 (38%)
7	20,000,000	7,000,000 (35%)
8	25,000,000	8,000,000 (32%)
9	30,000,000	9,000,000 (30%)

=== Winning ===
At the end of the game, victory points are tallied up to determine the winner. The formula is 1 victory point for each million in cash in hand plus the interest (the smaller number at the bottom of the bond certificate) for each bond held multiplied by the credit factor shown for that country on the counting chart. There are tiebreakers in the event two players have the same number of victory points.

=== Recognized variants ===
Various variant rule sets were created during play-testing of the game.

One variant, mentioned in the rule book, removes the investor card. The rule book notes that this creates a somewhat less exciting but more strategic game. It tends to prevent hostile takeovers before a country's first turn.

A house rule promulgated by the designer allows a player who controls no countries to collect 1M from the bank if he chooses not to invest when the investor card is activated. This may be particularly useful in 7-player games. It may also be a way to prevent less experienced players from getting "stuck" when they find themselves with no flag and little money.

The Swiss Bank variant, designed to benefit players who lose their last government, makes it possible to force a nation in which the owner of the Swiss bank holds bonds to stop on the investor field on the rondel. The blank cardboard tile included with the game indicates ownership of the Swiss bank. If the nation's treasury is not sufficient for all payouts, the nation cannot be forced to stop on Investor.

The game has a standard and advanced set of rules for beginning the game. Under the standard rules, each player starts out with control of a given country and also acquires two bonds in other countries. The game is generally regarded as "broken" under this set of rules because a player can have their country bought out from under them in the first turn, and end up sidelined from the action before he has even had a chance to act. This is somewhat offset by the rule that states that any player bought off the rondel receives $1,000,000 from the buying player and then has the immediate opportunity to buy any available bond. Each time the investor space is passed, the player-without-country again has the chance to buy any available bond. This remains the case until the player-without-country has a majority share of any country. The advanced rules call for a series of opportunities for each player in rotating order to purchase one bond of any available value from each country at the start of the game; a player can still end up in a situation where they control no countries, but is less likely and presumably involves an error in the initial bidding.

== Imperial 2030 ==
A new version of Imperial was released in 2009, Imperial 2030. It replaces the map of Europe with a world map. The playable countries are Russia, China, India, Brazil, the United States, and Europe (i.e. the European Union). It includes a number of subtle rules changes as well, notably including the Swiss Bank variant as a general part of the rules, increasing the price on high-power countries to skip ahead on the rondel, and changing the rules on bonuses for a taxation action to the controlling player of a power.
