= Khronos =

Khronos may refer to:

- Khronos (Maktub album)
- Khronos (Rotting Christ album)
- Khronos (game), a board game
- Khronos Group, an open standards consortium

== See also ==
- Chronos, the personification of time in Greek mythology
- Chronos (disambiguation)
- Kronos (disambiguation)
