= The Spoils (card game) =

Collectible card game

- The Spoils's card back design
- Designers: Designers: Josh Lytle, Dylan Mayo, Christopher Medina, Mikael Conrow and Ken Pilcher.
- Publishers: Arcane Tinmen
- Players: Two and up
- Setup time: 3–4 Minutes
- Playing time: ~30 Minutes^{1}
- Chance: Some
- Age range: 13 and up
- Skills: Card playing Arithmetic
- ^{1} Games may be shorter or longer depending on a deck's style of play.

The Spoils is an out-of-print collectible card game created by Tenacious Games and later acquired by Arcane Tinmen that was published from January 2009 to December 2016. It launched with a free open beta in August 2006, and officially released for sale in November 2006. The Spoils was in development from 2001 to 2006. The design team was headed up by Josh Lytle, who also designed the collectible card game Magi-Nation Duel. Jon Finkel, a prominent player in Magic: the Gathering's Pro Tour, aided the development team as an advisor since 2002. The Spoils Card Game, while under the design direction of Ken Pilcher, won the Fan Favorite Origins Award for Best Collectible Card Game at the 2015 Origins Game Fair.

== Gameplay ==
The Spoils uses a number of mechanics in common with other collectible card games. Unlike many games of this kind, players start the game with a Faction card in play, which determines how that player begins their turn and the actions they are allowed to take. Each Faction has unique special abilities. Currently, 6 Faction cards are available to the public. Special foiled versions of this card were given away at Gen Con.

Players need to accumulate Resource cards in order to play other cards. Certain cards are "Staple" Resources and any number of these may be played in a deck. As of the Seed Cycle, there is a rare Resource for each trade. The Factions count as Staples as well, according to the bottom of the card. However, since these are set apart at the beginning of the game or whenever you shuffle your deck, the word Staple tends to refer to Resources. Most cards require between 1 and 4 of these Staple Resources in play to meet the threshold indicated by Resource icons on cards. The Resource icons come in the form of five trades.

To supplement the Staple Resources, players may play any card from their hand face down as a Resource; however, cards played face down in this manner will not count towards the Resource threshold.

Playable cards come in several types, not counting Staples: Characters, Items, Tactics, and Locations. Each of these types often have subtypes. To win the game, the opponent's Faction must be reduced to 0 influence. The Tournament Faction starts with 25 influence. The Faction's influence may be reduced by attacking it with Characters, or by using Tactics or special abilities. Characters have three stats: Strength (amount of damage the Character deals), Life (amount of damage needed to destroy the Character), and Speed (faster Characters deal their damage earlier). The combat system is simple in design, but with the ability to have multiple attacks during a turn, the party system and speed mechanic, the game allows for a deep and rewarding strategic decision tree that is "easy to learn, but difficult to master".

The game was officially announced dead in the official sites forums after one of the companies key investors unexpectedly backed out and they could not find additional investors for the product in time to keep up with their release and tournament schedule. This occurred in early 2008 during the 2007-2008 economic crisis.

On 20 January 2009, the company Arcane Tinmen purchased the rights to The Spoils, and hired several members of Tenacious Games as well as Ken Pilcher to resume production. Fantasy Flight Games was the US distributor of Arcane Tinmen and had a viral marketing campaign at Gen Con 2009 about Spoils including T-shirts and promo cards. The game was announced dead for the second time in December of 2016 and ceased official publication after that time.

== Storyline and setting ==
The Spoils' storyline takes place in a world very different from our own, best described as "dark, absurdist fantasy." First Edition is set "150 years after the fall of the Marmothoan Empire." The Seed Cycle will take place 150 years prior to First Edition, presumably during the Fall of the Marmothoan Empire. Future sets following the release of the Seed Cycle will return to the time of First Edition.

=== Trades ===
The Spoils cards are designated by various types and trades.

- Banker (Greed icon): As a trade, the Bankers are heavy influence gainers and spenders, and are not known for their COVERT Characters. For instance, playing Concealed Goon (a COVERT Character) will cost you 5 influence, whereas playing Nasty Butler (a low-speed Character) will gain you 4 influence. Bankers also like to draw a lot of cards (using either Cash Out or Beatrix Winterbottom), and have direct Character removal with some benefit to/choice made by their opponents (Irresistible Bribe being an example).
- Rogue (Deception icon): As a trade, Rogues try to use their opponent's discard pile against them. And the way they facilitate this is to discard their opponent's library. One particular Character, Pluck, can snatch opponent's discarded Characters, Items or Locations for his controller's use. But it doesn't end in the discard pile; Rogues can take control of some cards their opponents control (an example of a Tactic of this type is Rapine). Some other traits of this trade are high-speed Characters, Speed manipulation, and removing opponent's discard cards from the game, as well as minor control (two examples being the Item Emergency Obfuscation and the Tactic Forced Recruitment).
- Warlord (Rage icon): As a trade, Warlords are the straightforward beaters and damage-dealers. They want to lay down efficient (strength to cost ratio) Characters to attack with while using damage dealing sources to clear the way. They also have cards that will help them to overwhelm their opponents with a sizable board control. They also have one of the most powerful Characters, the Dragon Tank, which destroys one enemy Character per turn and is a 10/10/4 as well, thus clearing the enemies away and doing tremendous damage.
- Gearsmith (Elitism icon): As a trade, Gearsmiths use cost reduction in many ways to help spur them ahead (with cards such as Jo Ciendeilio and 1337! aiding them in this endeavour). As well as possessing selective tutoring (drawing specific types of cards), the highest number of Item cards, and Character token creator cards (called Micromajigs, with the stats 1/1/3), they have a "Node" theme that can become quite powerful but is particularly vulnerable.
- Arcanist (Obsession icon): As a trade, the Arcanists sport the most COVERT Characters. They can bounce their opponent's permanents and force them to discard cards (using cards such as Forget and Degenerate Molestation), as well as generate tokens that can be used from certain cards to bounce cards (such as Quotidian Ejector) or cause their opponent to discard cards. Another ability of these arcane experimenters is to manipulate the libraries and to retrieve specific "type" cards (an example being Servile Centipede, which, on coming into play from your hand, allows you to search for a Tactic).

== The Spoils Tournament Experience ==
From August 1, 2006 through the October, 2006 launch date of The Spoils, Tenacious Games supported the release of a limited set of Open Beta cards of The Spoils Tournament Card Game with over 1000 free tournaments and over $60,000 in prize money.

In 2007, sanctioned tournament play was officially titled The Spoils Tournament Experience and given an official overall prize total of US$1,000,000.00.

Under the management of Arcane Tinmen, tournaments have begun to spring about again. Although none of them have had prize support nearly as grand as the original $1,000,000.00 tournament that Tenacious had originally sponsored, several tournaments have been held in conventions such as the annual World Championships at Gen Con, Origins Game Fair, Dragon Con, Tidewater Comic Con, and MegaCon.

Within Australia, the United Kingdom, France, Chile, Germany, and other countries, Arcane Tinmen has launched a new players promotion & championships which are composed of a series of events.

== Sets and cycles ==
To date there have been nine sets released between Tenacious Games and Arcane Tinmen. Beta was a limited edition set that was a precursor to 1st Edition. 1st Edition, and 1st Edition Part 2 was combined and reprinted at a later date as the 'core' set, or 2nd Edition. Seed I, II, and III have been combined and reprinted, along with over forty new cards and alternate artwork, as Seed Saga: The Descent of Gideon (formerly codenamed "Andreessen")

Set Name	# of Cards	Release
Open Beta	200	August 2006
1st Edition	220	November 2006
1st Edition, Part 2	165	March 2007
Seed: Children of the Lingamorph	220	December 2007
Seed II: Gloamspike’s Revenge	110	August 2010
Second edition	300	June 2011
Seed III: Fall of Marmothoa	30 + and additional 25 cards (Multiplayer and full art resources)	June 2012
Unlikely Heroes Block
Shade of the Devoured Emperor	130 cards	October 2013
Holy Heist	140 cards	April 2015
Ungodly Mess	140 cards	May 2016
Seed Revisited
Seed Saga: The Descent of Gideon	350 cards	August 2015

Project "Shh", "Be" and "Quiet" was announced on February 21, 2012.
"Shh" was the code name of Shade of the Devoured Emperor. Shade (for short) is the first of 3 sets in the Unlikely Heroes block. The Shade set was released on Oct 5, 2013 and is 130 cards. The set was sold in 13 card booster packs and contained commons, uncommons, rares and foils (premium cards). The second set in the "Unlikely Heroes" cycle, Holy Heist, was released in April 2015. The next set, Seed Saga: The Descent of Gideon was released on August 22, 2015 worldwide. The last set of the Unlikely Heroes Block, Ungodly Mess, was released in May 2016.

== Pop culture references ==
The Spoils is notable for its tongue-in-cheek style, most noticeable in its art and flavour text.

An example would be A Series of Tubes: the artwork depicts a mass of large tubes connected together at certain points, and with a small sign beside them with a picture of a dump-truck inside a red forbidden circle, in reference to the Series of Tubes speech. The flavour text also reads "It's not a dump-truck."

The Gearsmiths have some of the most obvious references, with cards such as 1337!. As well as that, most of their flavour text is written in 1337, especially on the 31f cards like 3p1ph4ny 31f.
