= Chronos (band) =

Russian band

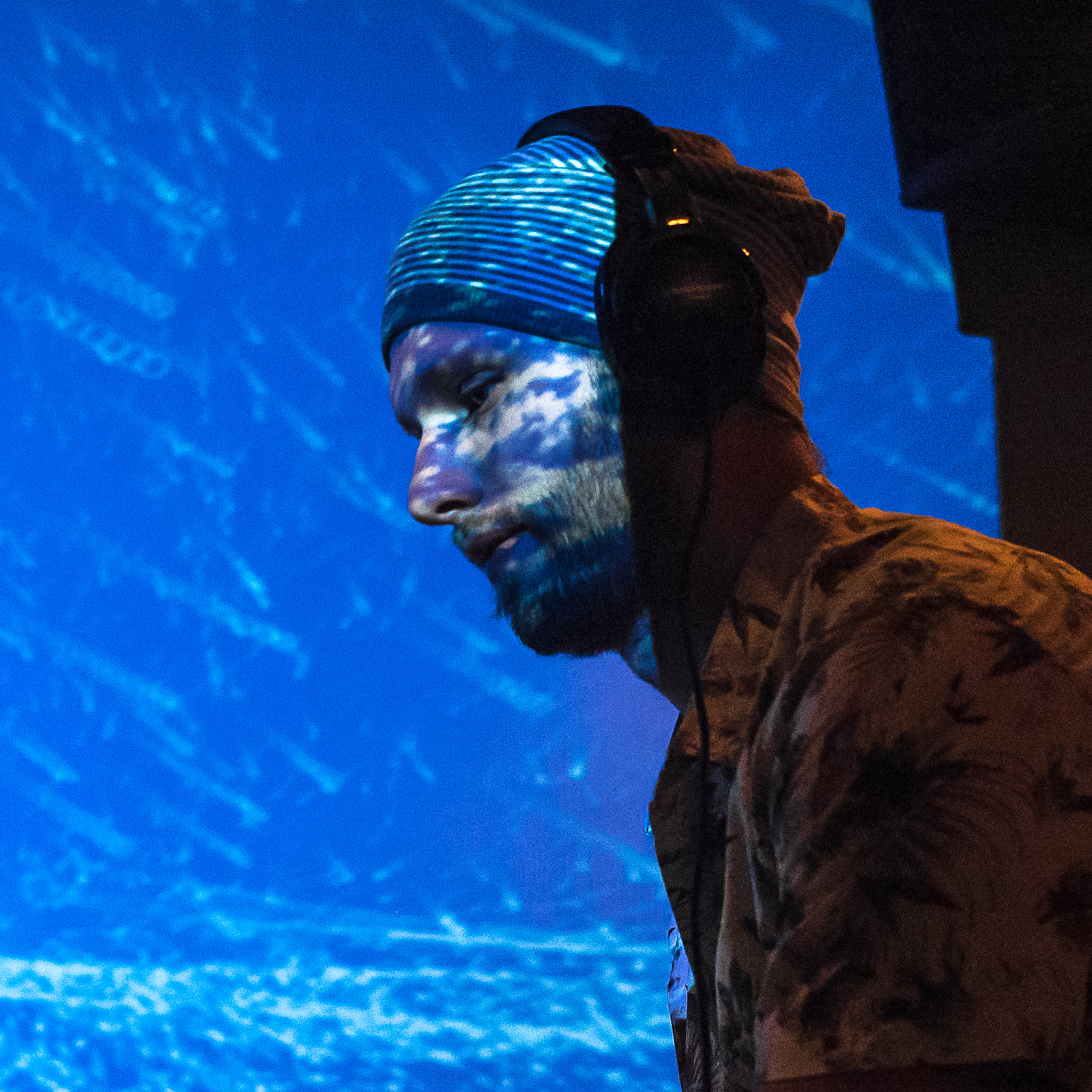

Background information
- Origin: Moscow, Russia
- Genres: Ethnic electronica, trip hop, downtempo
- Years active: 2004–present
- Members: Nick Klimenko; Alexey Ansheles; Galina Shchetinina; Alexey Shapovalov; Dinara Yuldasheva
- Website: chronos-music.ru

Chronos is a Russian music band formed in 2004 in Moscow. The project was started by Niсk Klimenko. The musical style of the project varies greatly within different genres of electronic music combined with motives of classical and ethnic music as well as vocal and recordings of nature sounds and live voices.

== Band members ==
- Nik Klimenko – ideology, music, keyboards.
- Alexey Ansheles – music, guitar.
- Galina Shchetinina – music, cello, vocals.
- Alexey Shapovalov – music, ethnic instruments, percussion.
- Dinara Yuldasheva – vocals, djembe.

== About the project ==
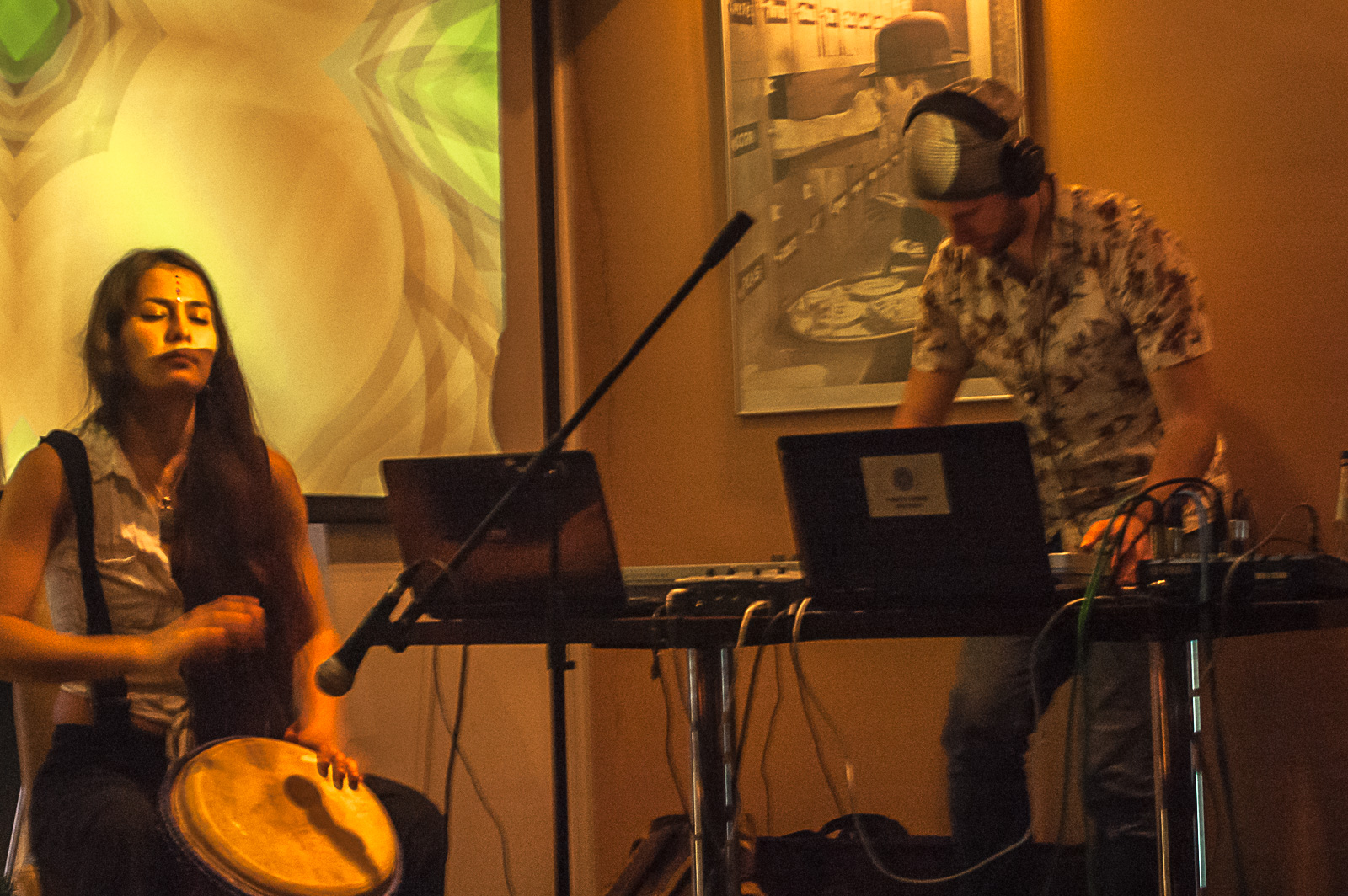
Chronos band bonus-concert after the Helios movie exclusive show in Kinosphere cinema, Moscow, 27 March 2015

The progenitor of the band is Nick Klimenko. Chronos project was formed in 2004. In 2007 the debut album Steps to the Great Knowledge was released at the Sunline Records.

== Appearances ==
- 2010 – audio-accompaniment of Alex Grey's live-painting at the Transfiguration performance ("The roof of the World" club, Moscow)
- 2012 – audio-visual concert and the When Mars Meets Venus album presentation in the Kyiv Planetarium «АTMASFERA 360»

== Discography ==
=== Studio albums ===
1. "Steps to the Great Knowledge" (2007)

1. The Gates
2. Step By Step
3. Stonehendge
4. Mandala
5. Self Overcoming
6. Mayan Artifact (part 1)
7. Mayan Artifact (part 2)
8. Shamora Ritual
9. Mayan Artifact

2. "Quid Est Veritas" with C.J. Catalizer (2009)

1. The Call
2. 4 AM
3. Ice Hearts Age
4. Unknown Civilizations
5. Spiral Clouds (Kumharas Edit)
6. Voice of Infinity
7. Crystallic Sea
8. Sounds of the World
9. Across the Universe (album edit 2009)
10. Sky Path (Zero Cult remix)
11. Quid Est Veritas?

3. "Inspirational Power" (2010)

1. Autumn Leaves
2. Planetarium (Ambient Version)
3. Towards the Light House
4. Deus Ex Machina
5. Deep Unity (Album Version)
6. Sky Path (Folk Remix)
7. Planetarium (Taff Remix)
8. Asura – The Prophecy (Chronos Remix)
9. Optimistic Future
10. Forgiveness

4. "When Mars Meets Venus, Part One: Mars» (2012)

1. Leaving Geia (Mechanical Edit)
2. Arkturus
3. Hi Tech Mosaic
4. Sequenced Engine
5. Zirda
6. One Touch & Whole Life
7. Shining Parallel World
8. Lullaby for the Little Robot
9. Broken Song
10. Pain Feedback
11. Alex Sparky

5. "When Mars Meets Venus, Part Two: Venus» (2012)

1. Leaving Geia
2. Vector of Friendship
3. Star Swimmer
4. Red Planet
5. Dark Flame Landing
6. Soaring in Abyss
7. Venus Eyes
8. Eclipse of Inner World
9. Galactic Winter

6. "Helios" (2013)

1. Out of Chaos
2. Moon Through a Lense
3. Deimos
4. Rotating Light Circles
5. Osiris (feat. Proton Kinoun)
6. Oracul
7. Dolphinium
8. Ancient Bells

7. "We Are One" (2014)

1. Synth Tuning
2. Endless Rotation of Feelings
3. We Are One
4. Space Cake (Gayatri Evening Version)
5. Solar Movement 2013
6. One Touch & Whole Life (United Rmx)
7. Tetra Window Room
8. Lullaby for the Little Robot (Acoustic Mix)
9. Limits Breaker (Album Version)
10. Alex Sparky (Progressive Mix)

=== Remix albums and EPs ===
- Natus in Spiritus (2009)
- Vargan (2010)
- When the Day Turns to Night (with Taff) (2010)
- Space Sweets & Logical Beats (2011)
- Limits Breaker (2012)
- Two Paths (2012)
- Tea & Music (2012)
- Mars & Venus remixes (2013)
- Improvisations (2014)
- Chronos & Alex Shapovalov – Warm Deep Space (2014)
