= Capes & Cowls =

Board game

Adventures in Wyrd City
- cover art by Robin Spriggs & Kelly O'Neal
- Designers: Robin Spriggs
- Publishers: Wyrd House
- Players: 2 to 4
- Setup time: 5 minutes
- Playing time: 1 hour
- Chance: low
- Age range: 9 and up
- Skills: strategy, tactics

Capes & Cowls: Adventures in Wyrd City (usually referred to as Capes & Cowls or merely C&C) is an expandable "book-in-a-box" superhero board game based on Capes & Cowls: The Wyrd City Chronicles by Robin Spriggs. Prior to its commercial release by Wyrd House Press in 2006, the game had been in private circulation, according to publisher Jazz Lieberman, “for well over a decade.”

== Gameplay ==
Capes & Cowls is a superhero skirmish game for two to four players. Each player recruits a team of super-powered characters from the Wyrd City dramatis personæ and sends them into battle against the other players' teams. The game is played on a"Battleboard” where color- and number-coded spaces affects character abilities and power levels, emphasizing strategic play. While some actions are determined by the roll of a “Battle Die,” success depends more on effective team recruitment and management than on luck.

Capes & Cowls features three primary modes of play, along with solitaire and multiplayer versions. The primary modes are:

Basic: Each player recruits a team of two or three Heroes and competes on the Battleboard for a set number of rounds. The player with the most Heroes at the end of the game is the winner.

Standard: Each player recruit a team of four or five Heroes. Competition is similar to basic mode, with the addition of Scene Features and Objects, encouraging more tactical planning.

Adventure: This mode features scenarios from the "Adventure Book", each with its own map, rules, and objectives. It introduces additional characters, items, and narrative elements set in the Wyrd City universe. The player whose team meets the scenario’s objective wins the game.

== Setting ==
Though Capes & Cowls emulates the visual aesthetics and fanciful exploits of golden-age and silver-age superhero comic books, its action takes place in a markedly dystopian alternate universe wherein the entire known world falls under the tyrannical jurisdiction of the Wyrd City Powers That Be (WCPTB) and its street-level enforcers, the Wyrd City Freedom Patrol.

Indignant at the appropriation of their sacred name by a government so oppressive, the celestial Sisters Wyrd unleash upon the world the long-buried forces of mystery, wonder, and magic. This act of cosmic intervention, over time, brings into being a pantheon of super-powered heroes and villains (aside from their telltale biographies and certain scenarios in the game's Adventure Book, no overt distinctions are made between the two) who find themselves at constant odds with not only the Wyrd City Freedom Patrol, but often with each other as well.

== Characters ==
The characters included in the Capes & Cowls master set (all of them principals and supporting cast from the Wyrd City universe) are divided into two types—Heroes and Crews. Both are represented by stand-up figures and character cards. Heroes are depicted on large, blue character cards and defined by name, portrait, stats, and three unique powers, while Crews are depicted on small, gray character cards and defined by name, portrait, stats, and one unique power. The Heroes, Crews, and character-specific powers are as follows:

Heroes

- Baron Necro (Summon the Dead, Kiss of Death, Zombify)
- Battery-Man (Voltaic Assault, Acid Splash, Recharge)
- Black Manx (Pounce, Bad Luck, Caterwaul of Doom)
- Blaze (Fireborn, Great Balls of Fire, Up in Flames)
- Blue Malkin (Diamond Claws, Heightened Senses, Nine Lives)
- Brown Recluse (Venom Punch, Web Shoot, Hide)
- Da-Blink (Teleport, Blink-n-Bop, Poof!)
- Dagon (Mermight, Water Speed, Perilous Waters)
- Demoniac (Glide, Demonic Descent, Infernal Resilience)
- Diablo Azul (Bedevil, Mind Control, The Devil’s Own)
- Doctor Grimfate (Curse, Thwart, Tragic End)
- Elastra (Stretch-n-Smack, Entangle, Rubberama Mama)
- Fantazm (Ghostly Grasp, Spectral Passage, Fantazmal Form)
- Frostbite (Ice Surf, Freeze Ray, Glacial Shield)
- Golden Rocket (Blast Off!, Palm Thrusters, Human Missile)
- Green Gremlin (Jinx, Marplot, Backfire)
- Hellrags (Hellfork, Soulsuck, Scarecrow Smother)
- Hotshot (Crack Shot, Boom Ball, Bull’s-eye)
- Lady Lightning (Fists of Lightning, Lightning Bolt, Lickety-split)
- Manchine (Dynablast, Power Boost, Lockdown)
- Marasmos (Wither, Shrivel, Decay)
- Mole (Tunnel, Surprise Attack, Cave-in)
- Moon-Beast (Beastly Transformation, Lunatical Vigor, Bad Moon Rising)
- Mysteria (Sorcerous Assault, Enchantment, Bewitch)
- Nightshade (Nightforce, Noctiblast, Shadow Walk)
- Red Rook (Flight, Swoop Assault, Battle Shriek)
- Serapha (Divine Ascent, Heal, Sanctuary)
- Star Knight (Star Blade, Star Shield, Stellar Leadership)
- Tenebro (Dark Rend, Scotoshield, Blackout)
- Time Meister (Time Warp, Time Rift, Time’s Up)
- Titana (Outmuscle, Harsh Mistress, Hard Woman)
- Ygg (Monstrous Smash, Thunder Stomp, Regeneration)

Crews

- Arachnidrones (Spider Climb)
- Darklings (Pitch Dark)
- Diabloids (Devil Driven)
- Freedom Patrols (Freedom Blaster)
- Liberty Bots (Built for Battle)
- Thugs (Pistol)
- Zombies (Zombify)
