= Luck of the Draw (board game) =

Drawing game published in 2006

Luck of the Draw is a drawing game published in 2006. Distinguishing it from other games in the genre, all players draw the same subject and advancement is effected by voting for the most appropriate drawing in various categories rather than guessing a subject. Because the categories are not directly related to artistic skill, players with advanced drawing ability are not favored. The game was conceptualized by Donald W. Scott and is produced under license by Gamewright.

== Components ==
Luck of the Draw includes:

- 210 Subject cards
- 105 Category cards
- Hourglass style sand time (approximately 45 seconds)
- 8 pads of paper
- 8 Pencils
- 8 Voting Wheels
- 8 colored chips
- 1 die showing numbers 1, 2, or 3
- rules of play

== Objective ==
The objective is to collect the most category cards.

== Gameplay ==
Gameplay consists of a drawing phase and a voting phase.

=== Drawing phase ===
One player selects a Subject card from the Subject box. Another player rolls the die and inverts the sand timer. Then all players have 45 seconds to draw the subject that matches the number rolled.

As drawings are completed, they are placed face down in the center of the play surface. All remaining players must place their drawings face down on the play surface when the timer expires.

=== Voting phase ===
One player then mixes the drawings, arranges them face up such that each is visible to all players, and places a randomly selected colored chip on the corner of each. Another player rolls the die to determine how many category cards will be voted on for the round. One player draws the first Category card from the Categories box and reads it aloud.

Examples of categories are:

- squiggliest
- ugliest
- most likely to hang on a refrigerator
- least realistic

Using Voting Wheels, all players secretly vote for the drawing they feel best fits the category by turning the wheel to the color that matches the chip on their chosen drawing. When all players have finished voting, the Voting Wheels are revealed simultaneously.

The player whose drawing receives the majority of the votes keeps the Category card. Mechanics are included in the rules of play to account for tie votes. The voting process is repeated the number of times shown on the die.

== Winning ==
The number of Category cards required to win a game of Luck of the Draw is dependent on the number of players; with fewer players more rounds will be played in a given time period and thus more points are required to win. The game can be played with as few as 4 players and as many as 8 or more.

== Awards ==
Luck of the Draw has been the recipient of numerous awards since its introduction. These include:

- Oppenheim Toy Portfolio Gold Award
- Scholastic Parent & Child Top Pick of 2006
- Adding Wisdom Award
- Canadian Toy Testing Council "Children's Choice" Award
- Canadian Toy Testing Council *** (Highest Rating)
- Dr. Toy's Top 100 Children's Products
- Dr. Toy's 10 Best Games of The Year
- Parenting for High Potential Magazine Recommended
- National Parenting Center Seal of Approval
- iParenting Media Award
- Major Fun Award
- Creative Child Magazine Game of the Year
