= Cronos =

Cronus, also spelled "Cronos" or "Kronos", was the leader and the youngest of the first generation of Titans in Greek mythology.

Cronos may also refer to:

== Arts and media ==
=== Fictional characters ===
- Cronos (Bloody Roar), a playable character in Bloody Roar video games
- Vellian Crowler (Cronos de Medici), a teacher character in Yu-Gi-Oh! GX
- Kronos in Percy Jackson and the Sea of Monsters
- Cronos in Supernatural (American TV series) Season 7 Episode 12 "Time After Time"
- Cronos, a character in the video game series God of War

=== Other uses in arts and media ===
- Cronos (film), a 1992 Mexican horror film
- Conrad Lant (known as Cronos, 1963-2026), British musician
  - Cronos (band), formed by Lant
- Machine Robo: Revenge of Cronos, a 1986 anime series
- Cronos: The New Dawn, a 2025 video game
- Stage name of Conrad Lant
- Cronos (band), a British heavy metal band

== Other uses ==
- Mazda Cronos, a car brand in Japan 1991-1995
- Cronos, a humanist typeface by Robert Slimbach
- Fiat Cronos, a compact sedan car

== See also ==
- Chronos, the personification of time in Greek mythology
- Chronos (disambiguation)
- Khronos (disambiguation)
- Qo'noS, in Star Trek
