= Dorn (board game) =

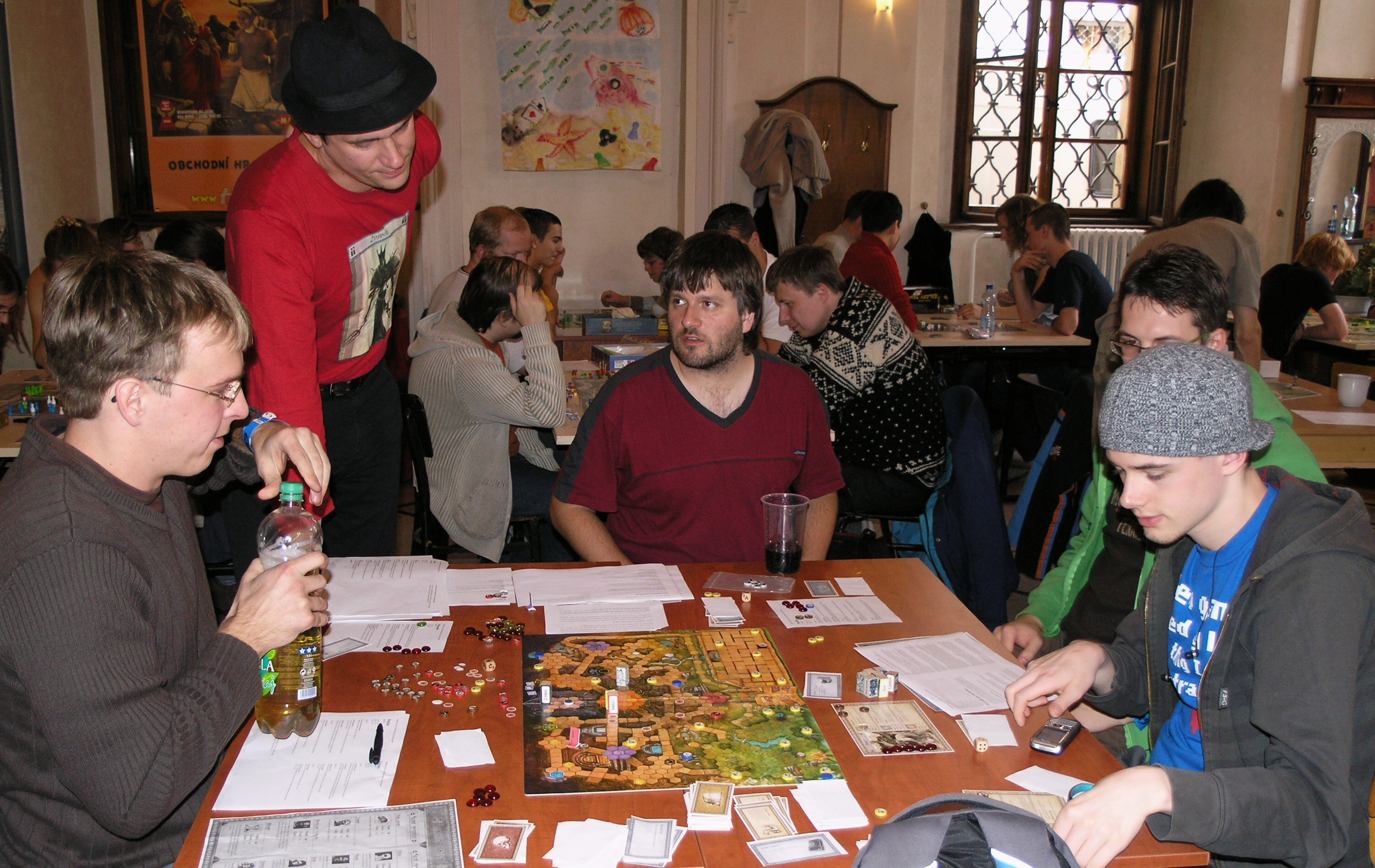
- Designers: Danek, Kozak, Drevikovsky
- Publishers: Altar
- Players: 2 to 6
- Setup time: 7 minutes
- Playing time: 60–180 minutes
- Chance: Limited, no dice used in combat
- Age range: 10 and up
- Skills: Strategic thinking

Dorn is a tactical fantasy board game developed in Czech Republic and published by Altar in 2006.

One or more players control a group of heroes and one player controls the evil Dornkeeper and his monsters. The heroes need to collect three artifacts from the game board and then they can challenge the Dornkeeper himself. As there is no dice in combat, the game is based on strategy and tactics, when heroes need to cooperate in order to win.

There are nine heroes to choose from, each having unique abilities on three experience levels. The Dornkeeper has eight different types of monsters at his disposal. Treasure cards found on the gameboard as well as random Blessing cards make every game quite different, there is no ultimate winning strategy.

In November 2009, the first expansion became available, with the title "Eternal Return of the Koschei", featuring new heroes, monsters and an immortal Dornkeeper.

The game was originally published in Czech, but is now available in English (including the first expansion).

The game was featured in Essen Game Fair in 2008 and received critical acclaim for its original approach to traditional fantasy topic. Positive reviews were published on various gaming sites.
