= Khronos (game) =

Boardgame

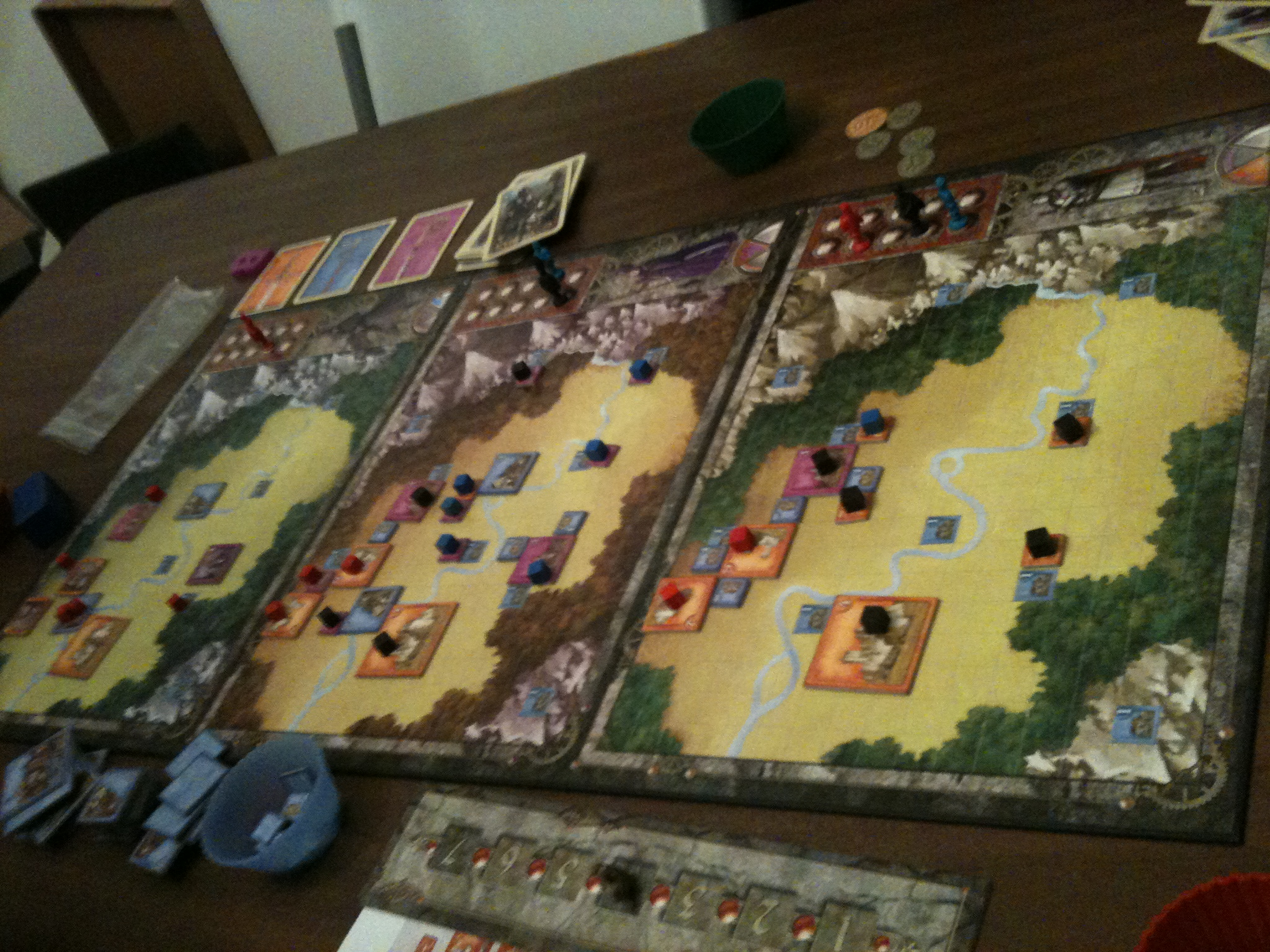
- A game of Khronos in progress
- Designers: Ludovic Vialla, Arnaud Urbon
- Publishers: Rio Grande Games
- Players: 2 to 5

Khronos is a board game for two to five players designed by Ludovic Vialla and Arnaud Urbon. In the game, players build domains by laying tiles representing buildings on three game boards, each representing the same area in three different ages. By paying one coin, players can time travel between the different ages. The game lasts seven turns. Players receive money based on the strength of their buildings in the various ages at the end of their fourth and seventh turns.

There are three kinds of buildings, each represented by a different colour: military (orange), religious (purple), and civil (blue). Each colour is most powerful in one of the three ages. Each building costs a certain amount of correctly coloured cards (drawn on each turn) to build. The building cost is also the number of coins a building generates when scoring takes place. The time travel aspect of the game comes into play in that larger buildings built in earlier ages "ripple" forward to the game boards in the future. Buildings in the future can potentially be destroyed in this way.

In 2006 it won the Concours International de Créateurs de Jeux de Société award (see Concours de créateurs de jeux).

== Reviews ==
- Pyramid
- Rebel Times
