= Dungeon Twister =

2004 board game

Dungeon Twister is a strategy board game with a fantasy theme. Dungeon Twister was created by Christophe Boelinger, who published other French games such as Halloween Party, A Dog's Life, and Snowboard. Dungeon Twister was originally printed in French and has gained popularity worldwide with English and German releases.

== History ==
The Dungeon Twister Basic Set was produced in France in 2004 by Asmodée Éditions. It was again produced in 2005 in the U.S., also by Asmodée. In November 2009, Asmodée and Hydravision Entertainment together announced that a video game adaptation of the game would be released in Q3 2009 for Xbox 360 via Xbox Live Arcade. In May 2012, it was announced that the Xbox 360 had been dropped in favor of PlayStation 3, with a new release slated for Q2/Q3 2012 via PlayStation Network. In late June 2012, the final release date of 3 July 2012 was announced. Boellinger stated that he liked the game, but the game saw very negative reception from critics.

On April 14, 2014, a crowdfunding project launched on Ulule, in order to make the adaptation of the game on tablets and smartphones.

== Editions ==
Appeared in French, English and German:

- Basegame
- Paladins & Dragons
- 3/4-Players
- Forces of Darkness
- Prison

Just in French and English:

- Mercenaires
- Fire and Water

Just in French:

- Fire and Blood (A feu & à sang)
- Forest creatures (Créatures Sylvestres)
- Iceearth (Terres de Glace)

== Tournaments ==
=== World cup ===
- 2012 : Germany Ansgar Ludwig
- 2011 : Germany Christian Freidl
- 2010 : Germany Christian Freidl
- 2009 : Belgium Fabrice Wiels
- 2008 : France Florian Vacheresse
- 2007 : France Mickaël Bonnefoy
- 2006 : France Florian Vacheresse

=== Three nations cup ===
- 2011 : Germany Saskia Ruth
- 2010 : Germany Jan Oliver Noll
- 2009 : Belgium Fabrice Wiels
- 2008 : Belgium Pierre Schomus

=== German championship ===
- 2013 : Germany Brian Zeltsch
- 2012 : France Jérôme Jambert
- 2011 : Belgium Xavier Heeren
- 2010 : Germany Mario Krone
- 2009 : Belgium Pierre Schomus

=== Belgian championship ===
- 2010 : Germany Saskia Ruth
- 2009 : Belgium Pierre Schomus
- 2008 : Germany Saskia Ruth
- 2007 : Belgium Nicolas Buckens
- 2006 : France François Sansot

=== French championship ===
- 2011 : France Alexandre Bern
- 2010 : Belgium Xavier Heeren
- 2009 : France Illia Racunica
- 2008 : France Arnaud Fresnel
- 2007 : France Florian Vacheresse
- 2006 : France Christophe André
- 2005 : France Illia Racunica

=== The first three positions of the annual LIDT rankings ===
2010	Germany Christian Freidl 606 PTS	Belgium Xavier Heeren 460 PTS	Germany Saskia Ruth & Belgium Fabrice Wiels 410 PTS
2009	Belgium Fabrice Wiels 1100 pkt	Belgium Pierre Schomus 762 pkt	Germany Christian Senksis 510 pkt

== Reviews ==
- Pyramid
