= Pirate King (boardgame) =

Strategy-action board game

- Illustrators: Cliff Cramp
- Publishers: FlasterVenture LLC; Temple Games, Inc.
- Players: 2–4
- Setup time: 25–30 minutes
- Playing time: 120–240 minutes (2–4 hours) [average]
- Chance: High (dice rolling, card drawing)
- Skills: Negotiation, Resource management

Pirate King is a strategy-action board game. It was released by Temple Games, Inc, in 2006, with the help of FlasterVenture LLC. It made its first appearance in Barnes & Noble Stores, where it was warmly welcomed by the public.

Players each control one ship, with which their aim is to gain control over the seas and other players, to win the game. To do so, they will have to capture islands, improve them, and find buried treasure. Made for 2 to 4 players, this Monopoly-like strategy game is finished in 3 hours, for an average play.
