= Marvel Heroes (board game) =

Marvel Heroes is a strategy fantasy board game for two to four players. Designed by Marco Maggi and Francesco Nepitello, with Roberto Di Meglio, Simone Peruzzi e Salvatore Pierucci, was created by Nexus Editrice. The English version was released by Fantasy Flight Games in 2006.

== Overview ==
Each player chooses to play one of four 4-character Marvel Comics superhero teams. Each player also controls the archenemy of one of the opponents' team to the left of them. These 20 characters, listed below, are represented in the game by fully colored miniatures; other heroes, villains, and characters in the Marvel Universe are represented by cards which influence gameplay. Each turn, a player manipulates one or more of their four main heroes and plays cards to solve mysteries, stop crimes, and defeat villains.

== Teams ==
The four superhero teams are available for play and the characters represented by miniatures in the game include:

Marvel Knights

- Spider-Man
- Daredevil
- Elektra
- Doctor Strange

Archenemy: Kingpin

X-Men

- Wolverine
- Cyclops
- Storm
- Phoenix

Archenemy: Magneto

Fantastic Four

- Mr. Fantastic
- Invisible Woman
- Thing
- Human Torch

Archenemy: Doctor Doom

Avengers

- Captain America
- Thor
- Iron Man
- Hulk

Archenemy: Red Skull

== Board ==
The game board is of New York City. It is split into 6 Areas, each a different colour. These areas are Upper Manhattan, Central Manhattan, The Village, Lower Manhattan, Queens and Brooklyn.

The Areas are then split into 4 Districts.

Upper Manhattan

- Central Harlem
- Morningside Heights
- East Harlem
- Carnegie Hall

Central Manhattan

- Central Park
- Upper West Side
- Upper East Side
- Midtown

The Village

- Hell's Kitchen
- Chelsea
- Greenwich Village
- East Side

Lower Manhattan

- East Village
- Lower East Side
- Tribeca
- Financial District

Queens

- Astoria
- Steinway
- Long Island City
- Sunnyside

Brooklyn

- Greenpoint
- Williamsburg
- Bedford–Stuyvesant
- Brooklyn Heights

== Reviews ==
- Pyramid
- Rebel Times #5
