= Spiel =

Boardgame trade fair in Essen, Germany

Coordinates: 51.4280°N 6.9942°E

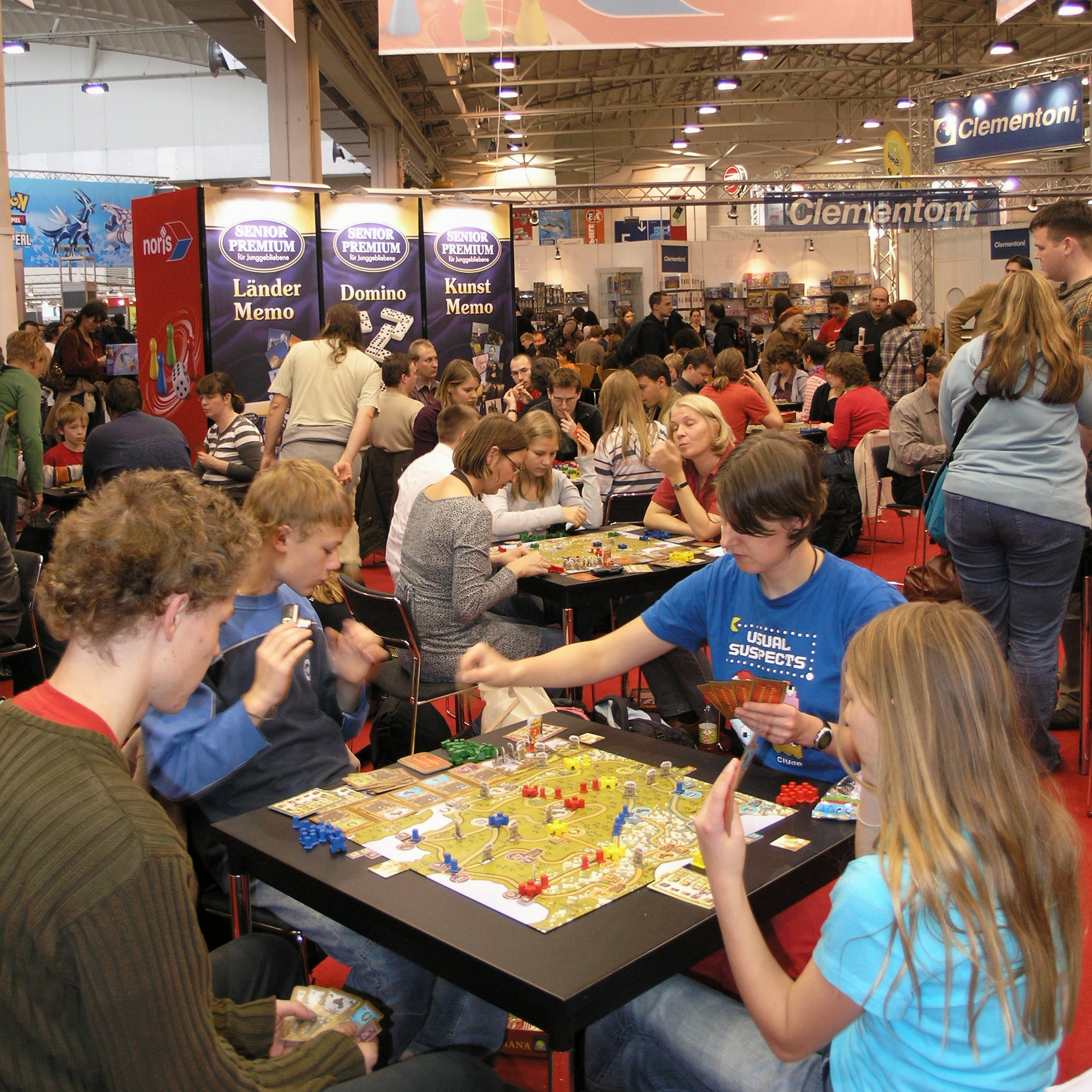
- Spiel 2008
- Genre: Board game trade fair
- Frequency: Annual
- Venue: Messe Essen
- Country: Germany
- Inaugurated: 1983
- Attendance: 220,000 (2025)
- Website: www.spiel-essen.de/en/

Internationale Spieltage SPIEL, often called the Essen Game Fair after the city where it is held, is an annual four-day public boardgame trade fair held in October (Thursday to the following Sunday) at the Messe Essen exhibition centre in Essen, Germany. It began in 1983. With 220,000 people attending, 948 exhibitors from 50 nations presenting more than 1700 new board games in 2025, SPIEL is the biggest fair for board games in the world - a title it had for over a decade. Many new games are released at the fair each year, especially (but not exclusively) European-style board games.

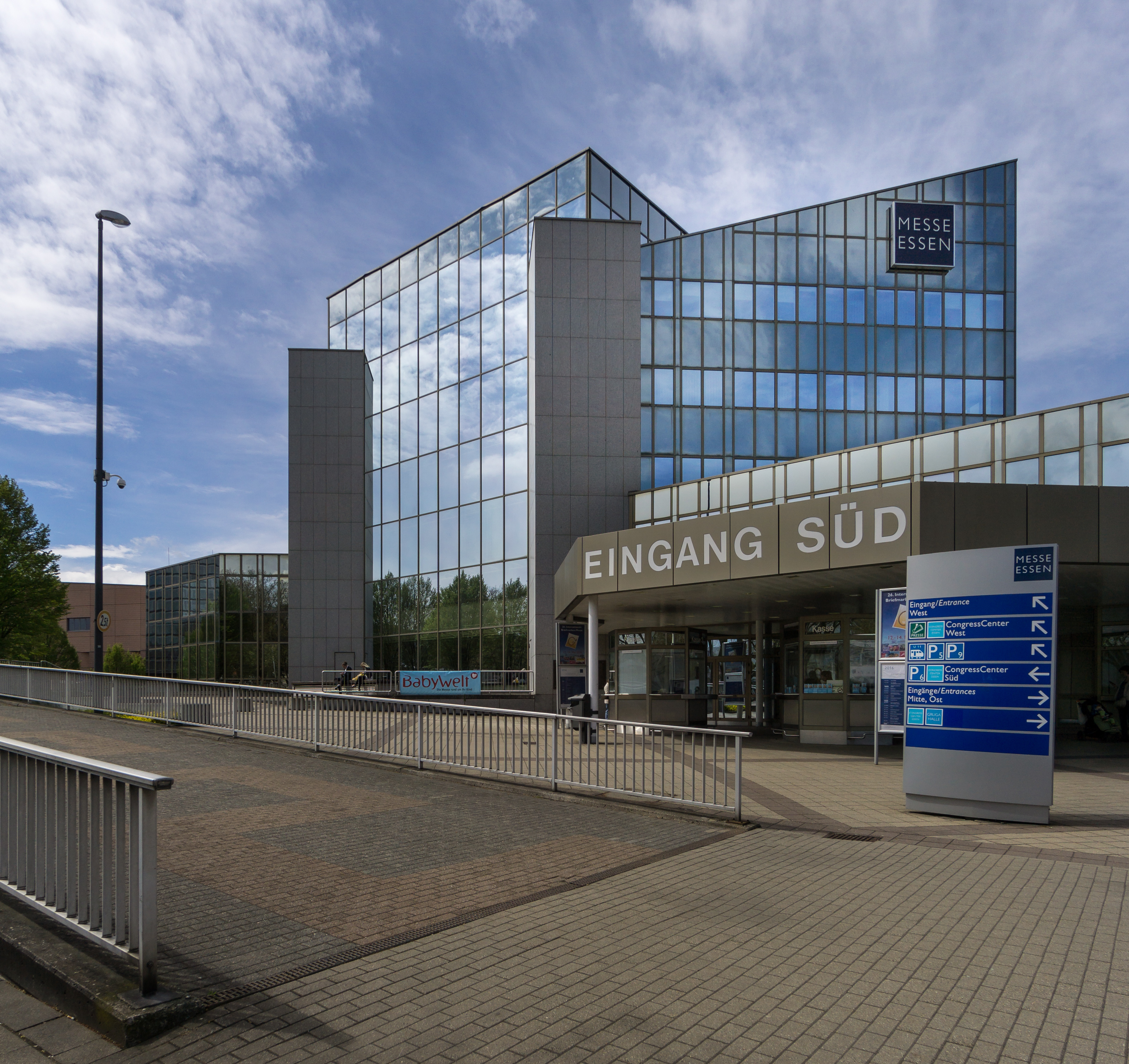
Messe Essen, the event venue

At SPIEL, board games that are often hard to find in retail are offered by international and small exhibitors. While the prices for buying these games at the fair do not tend to be significantly lower than in retail, games are typically available sooner than in regular board game shops and may come with promotional materials (mostly extra cards or tokens with a few more game mechanics, but also T-shirts and similar merchandise). SPIEL also provides an environment for board gamers to meet and chat with game designers, illustrators, and game reviewers.

== Years and attendance ==
Year	Attendance	Source
2011	147 000	
2012	149 000	
2013	156 000	
2014	158 000	
2015	162 000	
2016	174 000	
2017	182 000	
2018	190 000	
2019	209 000	
2020	(Note: Cancelled due to the COVID-19 pandemic and replaced by a digital convention.)0	
2021	93 600	
2022	147 000	
2023	193 000	
2024	204 000	
2025	220 000	
2026	230 000	

== See also ==
- Going Cardboard (documentary)
- Spiel des Jahres (award)
- Gen Con
