= Formula 1 (board game) =

1962 board game

- Designers: John Howarth & Trevor Jones
- Publishers: Alga (Brio); Miro Company; Parker Brothers; Smeets & Schippers; Waddingtons
- Players: 2 to 6
- Setup time: 5 minutes
- Playing time: 30 minutes
- Chance: Low (dice rolling)
- Age range: 10 and up

Formula 1 is a motor racing themed board game designed by John Howarth and Trevor Jones and originally published by Waddingtons of Leeds, United Kingdom in 1962.

== Equipment ==
Playing pieces

The following were included in the game box:

- One game board of thin cardboard with two folds, measuring 28 by 19 inches (71 by 48 cm) overall and depicting a stylised early 1960s Formula One motor racing track in plan view
- Six 1 by 5/8 inch (2.5 by 1.6 cm) plastic playing pieces in the form of late 1950s / early 1960s style Formula One racing cars coloured green, yellow, red, orange, dark blue and black
- Six thin cardboard dashboards coloured to match the playing pieces and each depicting a speedometer (0–160), lap indicator (0–10), tyre wear gauge (0–8) and brake wear gauge (0–5), all unit-less
- Two dice
- Thirty tactic cards
- Sixteen pit cards
- One eight page Rules of Play booklet.

Dashboards

== Play ==
=== Official ===
Game in play showing board, playing pieces, card packs and dice

The game is unusual in that the dice are used only for deciding penalties; each player decides what speed (how many spaces on the track) their car travels each turn, the current speed being recorded on the speedometer.

Each space represents 20 mph. Cars can accelerate by up to 60 mph (three spaces) per turn in increments of 20 mph. Corners have speed limits beyond which a car will spin off; excessive braking to avoid this will incur tyre wear and/or brake wear determined by rolling the dice and reading the result against a "Speed Reduction chart" printed on the board.

When either tyre or brake wear becomes excessive acceleration and deceleration are limited until the car visits the pits to reset the gauges. On doing so a Pit card must be drawn to obtain either a small advantage or a small disadvantage.

Playing a Tactic card at the start of ones turn will provide a small advantage e.g. a speed boost. Five are dealt to each player at the start of the game.

When a car crosses the chequered line having completed the agreed number of laps it is finished. Play continues until the last player in the round has had their turn. The winner is the car furthest beyond the finish line.

=== Variations ===
With few players or more than one game set it is possible to play using teams of cars.

== Strategy ==
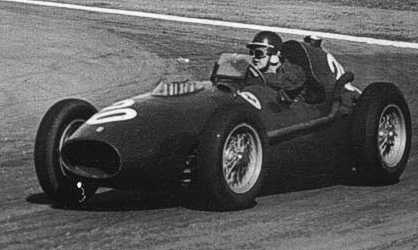
Mike Hawthorn in his Ferrari in the 1958 Argentine Grand Prix

Strategy primarily involves:

- judging acceleration and braking so as to minimise tyre and brake wear while making progress as rapidly as possible
- careful consideration of the line taken through corners
- taking full advantage of baulking opportunities i.e. blocking the road to other drivers particularly at corners
- the timing of pit stops
- judicious use of Tactic cards.

== Recognition ==
An original copy of the game is held by the Victoria and Albert Museum, a prominent art and design museum in London. The museum describes the game by saying "It was a success when released in 1962, and was released in various international editions throughout the next two decades."

The British broadsheet newspaper the Daily Telegraph carried an online motoring-section article in 2004 noting that "In the 1970s, many a wet Saturday afternoon could happily be spent in your living room, ... Waddington's Formula 1 – the prince of all board games – on the floor." and the following year the same column mentioned it as a recommended retro purchase.

Reviews by board-game enthusiasts and special-interest sites include:

Formula 1 is, arguably, the benchmark against which all other motor racing board games must be measured. The reason is simple: skill is the predominant factor... The central idea that makes the game worthwhile is that movement is fully under player control... I never understood why they stopped making this game: if you ever see it anywhere, buy it.

— Dave Budd,

The game's simplicity makes it accessible to younger players, whilst it remains enjoyable by adults. I just like the dashboards ;-)

— BoardGameGeek,

The game continued to be bought and sold online in 2015.

== Reviews ==
- Games & Puzzles #11
- Games & Puzzles #13

== See also ==
- Formula D (board game)
- Racetrack (game)
