= Afrikan tähti =

1951 Finnish board game

- original box art
- Designers: Kari Mannerla
- Publishers: Peliko
- Players: 2–6
- Setup time: 1–5 minutes
- Playing time: 16–60 minutes
- Chance: High (dice rolling, luck)

Afrikan tähti ([ˈɑfrikɑn ˈtæhti]; Finnish for 'Star of Africa'), known in Swedish as Den försvunna diamanten ('The Missing Diamond') or Afrikas stjärna ('The Star of Africa'), is a Finnish board game designed by Kari Mannerla originally in 1951. It has been one of the most popular board games in the Nordic countries for decades.

== History ==
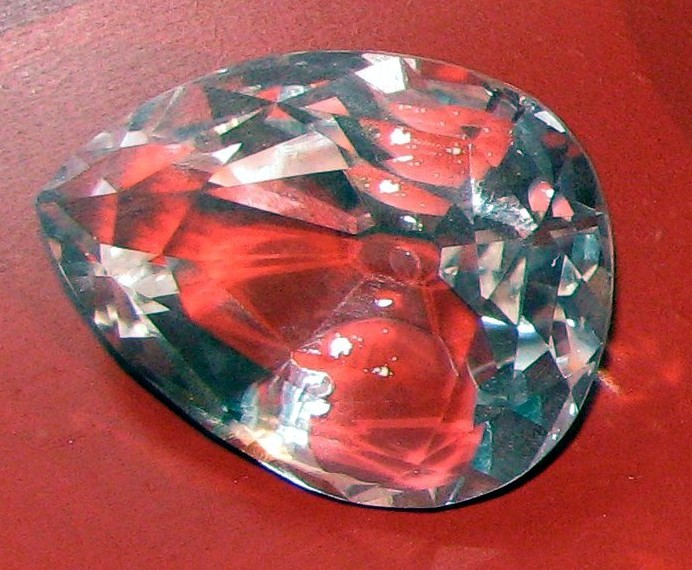
The "Great Star of Africa" cut from the Cullinan Diamond, which the game is named after. This picture shows a copy located at the Reich der Kristalle museum in Munich; the original diamond is attached to the sceptre of the ruler of the United Kingdom.

The board game was first published year 1951 in Helsinki, Finland. Stories of the world's largest diamond – the Star of Africa having been found in South Africa – had inspired the imagination of young Kari Mannerla after he had been watching Humphrey Bogart films. He managed to get a hold of a wrinkled map of Africa in the English language and picked exotic sounding places such as Casablanca and Dar es Salaam. He then drafted land, sea and air routes arbitrarily across and around the continent. During his design process, an important innovation was that players could pick their route of choice, instead of following a pre-set course. A further revelation was the tokens that are shuffled before each game and placed randomly throughout the board. None of the players know which surprise is hidden under each token. The robbers and horseshoes were considered to add to the excitement of the game.

Kari Mannerla had been designing board games since he was 14 years old. Some of his games included Totalisaattoriravit, Gangsterit kiinni, Radiumtaistelu Marsissa, Merten kauhu (1948) and Inkan aarre. He sold these games for a small one-time fee, and none of them became lasting favourites like Afrikan tähti.

Afrikan tähti was the last of Kari Mannerla's games. He was then already an "experienced" 19-year-old game designer and he intuitively sensed that this one was unique. He offered it to the large book publishing company Tilgmann. Price negotiations took a few years and finally he accepted a modest compensation for 10,000 printed games. His condition to the publisher was that any further prints would be negotiated separately. This was not an issue to the publisher because most board games would not go on to be reprinted. However, the next year another 10,000 copies were printed, and the game received many subsequent reprints. The game sold more than 100,000 copies in seven years, which is a record even today.

Mannerla first offered the game for publishing at the printing press Tilgmann. The negotiations for the price lasted a couple of years. Mannerla was satisfied with a rather modest reward for ten thousand copies on the condition that there would be an option for further prints. Tilgmann agreed, as it was not usual for games to get reprints. The deal was a success for Mannerla. The first copy of Afrikan tähti was printed in autumn 1951, and after seven years, one hundred thousand copies had been sold. The cover image was painted by Seppo Heinonen, who had worked at Tilgmann from 1957 to 1961.

Mannerla only actually visited Africa for the first time in the 1980s when he was on a trip to Morocco. He later made a comment about being amused about the design of the game board, that "it was moving how infantile the knowledge used to design it had been". On the other hand, he also said that "if you make an educational program, you won't get a good game".

Afrikan tähti has remained one of the most sold board games in Finland for 65 years. During this time it has been translated to over 16 languages. It is most popular in the Nordic countries, where it became widely marketed in Sweden, Norway and Denmark in 1960. In Sweden the game is called Den Försvunna Diamanten, in Norway Den Forsvunne Diamanten (both meaning "The Lost [or, Vanished] Diamond") and in Denmark Afrikas Stjerne (Star of Africa). In Finland over two million games have been sold, in Sweden and Norway almost one million and in Denmark half a million. There are over 4.5 million sold games internationally. During his retirement years Kari Mannerla revived one of his old creations Inkan aarre ("The treasure of the Inca") in a completely modified version. Inkan Aarre has sold over 100,000 copies in Finland. Both games are nowadays directly copyrighted to Kari Mannerla's five daughters. Afrikan tähti is a registered trademark in Finland.

== Rules ==
Afrikan tähti is a race between several players. The minimum is two players, and the maximum is theoretically unlimited, although with more than five or six players the game starts to become unplayable, due to long gaming turns and insufficient resources.

The board covers the continent of Africa, with famous cities marked as big red circles, and with routes consisting of small black circles connecting them. Players can start from either Cairo, Egypt or from Tangiers, Morocco, whichever they want.

The game uses a dice and play money. Notes in the values £100, £500 and £1,000 are supplied (referred to as "dollars" in the English language instructions).

Also included is a series of circular tokens, one token for each city. The tokens are not matched with specific cities, only their number is the same. Tokens include:

- Blank tokens.
- Gemstones. There are three different gems: rubies (red), emeralds (green) and topazes (yellow).
- Robbers.
- Horseshoes.
- The star of Africa itself. This is the only unique token in the game.

=== Game start ===
At the start of the game, all tokens are turned face down and shuffled, then distributed randomly at the cities, with one token at each city. At this point, no player knows which token is in which city.

Each player is given £300 as starting money and their character is placed in Cairo or Tangiers according to their preference.

=== Game rounds ===
On their turn, each player throws the dice, and moves the given number of steps along the routes. If they reach a city with its token still present, they have three options:

- Continue as normal.
- Buy the token. This costs £100.
- Stay in the city. On the following turns, the player may try to win the token by throwing the dice, instead of moving normally. On a 4, 5 or 6, the token is won.

Stopping short at a city is allowed.

If the player buys or wins the token, it is flipped over, the player acts according to the revealed token as follows:

- Blank token: Nothing happens.
- Gemstone: The gemstone is immediately sold for cash. Rubies are worth £1000, emeralds £600 and topazes £300.
- Robber: The player immediately loses all their money.
- Horseshoe: Acts as a substitute for the star of Africa, but only after the star has been found.
- Star of Africa: Finding this is the goal of the game. Taking it back to either Cairo or Tangiers wins the game.

Before the star of Africa has been found, horseshoes are useless and are discarded. After the famous diamond has been found, however, they become effective substitutes for it. Taking a horseshoe to Cairo or Tangiers when another player has the star of Africa wins the game.

=== Travel ===
There are three different forms of travel available:

- On foot. This moves on the regular routes and is free of charge.
- By aeroplane. Aeroplane routes connect some of the cities directly with each other. Travelling by aeroplane costs £300 and takes the player directly to the adjacent city.
- By ship. Ship routes are effectively similar to foot routes, but they are on the sea. Boarding a ship costs £100, after which the player may throw the dice to determine how many steps they can take on the sea-route. Unlike traveling by foot, players can not choose to pass by cities. If a player touches a city they have to end their turn and pay another £100 to take the boat back. According to the 2005 rule revision players with no money can also travel by sea but only a maximum of two steps at a time. The islands Madagascar and St. Helena are only reachable by aeroplane or ship. Canary Islands are only reachable by ship.

=== Special places ===
Some cities or other places on the board have special rules.

- In Slave Coast, getting a blank token causes the player to be enslaved and sold at the slave market. They may only proceed after three turns have passed without their participation.
- In Gold Coast, the value of gemstones is doubled.
- The first player to reach Cape Town is awarded £500.
- There is one step in Sahara where the player is ambushed by beduins and can only proceed after rolling 1 or 2.
- There are two steps in the sea near the island of St. Helena where the player's ship will be raided by pirates and the player can only proceed after rolling 1 or 2.

=== 2005 amendment to rules ===
A quirk in the rules can cause the game to become unwinnable. The islands of Madagascar, St. Helena and Canary Islands contain cities, and it is possible that the Star of Africa ends up being there. In such a case, if no player has £200 left (to get to the island and back again), the Star of Africa can not be transported to Cairo or Tangiers, and the game can not be won. To resolve this quirk, the rules were amended in 2005: If a player has no money left, they can travel on sea for free, but only up to two spaces per turn.

== Reception ==
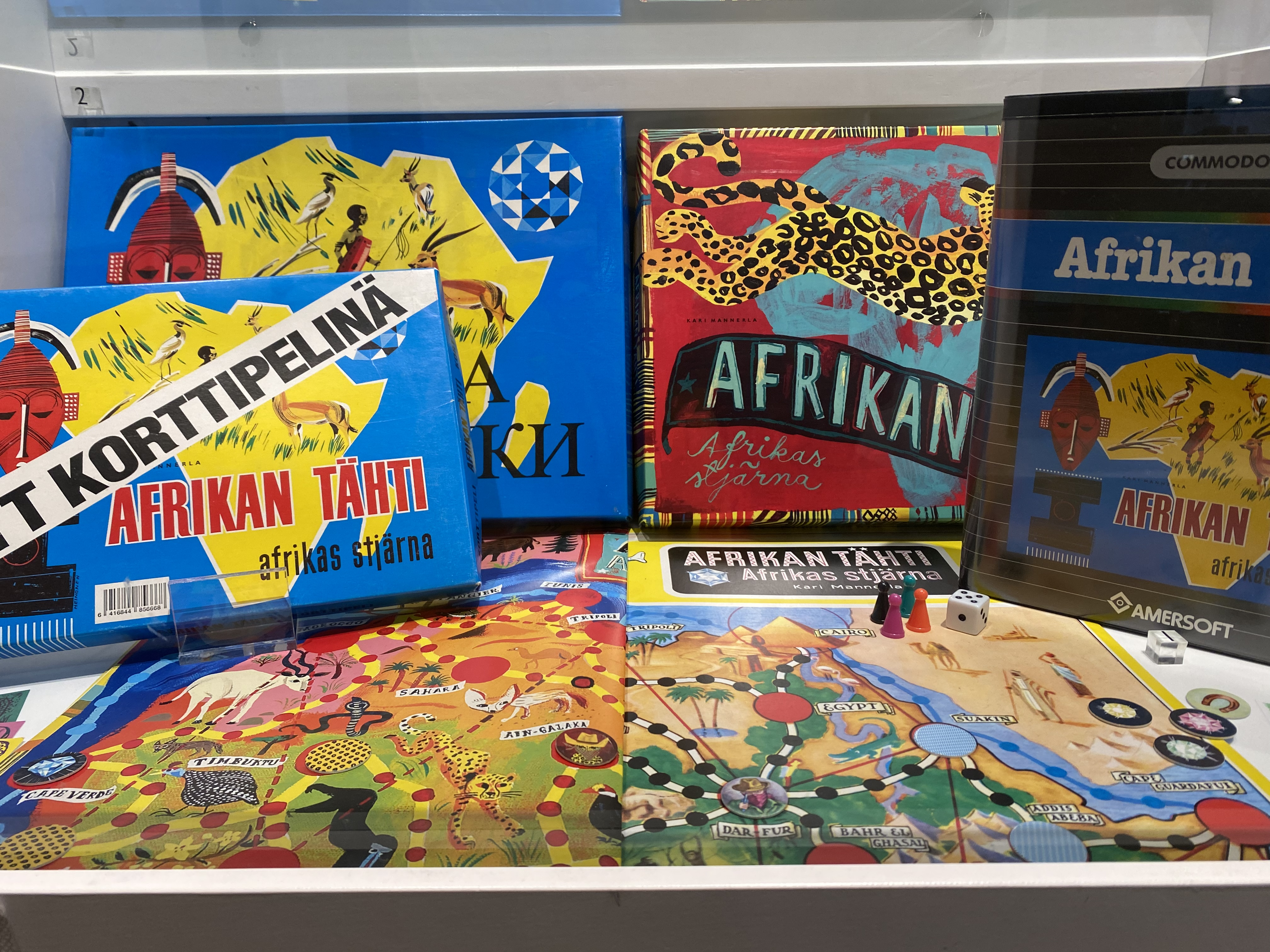
Afrikan tähti series in the museum

=== Popularity ===
Afrikan tähti has remained one of the most sold board games in Finland for over 60 years. The game has been called a lasting favourite uniting generations. In 2013 it had sold a total of four million copies internationally. It has been translated to over sixteen languages, and has reached its highest popularity in the Nordic countries. The first international version was published in Norway in 1956. The game is sold in Sweden as Den Försvunna Diamanten, in Norway as Den Försvunne Diamanten and in Denmark as Afrikas Stjerne.

=== Criticism ===
Humourless people could claim that Afrikan tähti is a colonialist game, as the players are only gathering natural resources. Doubtlessly the game carries on a colonial tradition, but on the other hand, even the robbers look European. Is there a great difference between the players and the Western-style robbers hiding on the game board? - Hannu Salmi, professor of cultural history.

Academic research has claimed the game repeats colonialist myths about Africa and Europeans exploiting it: for example the diamond has to be "brought into safety" into European-controlled cities. When the game was published in 1951, many African countries were still European colonies. According to Henna Ylänen, Afrikan tähti is a good example how little board games are controlled for the press and school books. The stereotypical images of Afrikan tähti are located at "a crossroads of play and humour, where there is more space also for the controversial or contradictory interpretations of the game". Despite the criticism, the game is still published as almost identical as its original 1951 version. The old-fashioned style of the images and names on the game have been seen as a part of the game's charm.

The game got some of the worst reviews for 1950s games at the website BoardGameGeek. According to the Finnish website Lautapeliopas, the game is a "merciless game of luck that leaves little room for skill" and hating the game is "an important connecting factor" for board game hobbyists.

== Expansion ==
In 2014, an expansion for the game called Retkikunnat ("The expeditions") was published, making the game more complex. In the expanded game, each player must choose a character and build an expedition from cards found on the table. There are now two tokens stacked on top of each other in every city, and the Star of Africa is found on a token on the bottom. Characters give different properties to the players: for example, the Banker character starts off with more money. The expansion also includes danger and event cards, affecting the game play. When visiting a city, a player draws an event card, which can for example result in fear of flight or sea sickness. As a new feature, it is now also possible to steal the Star of Africa from the player who found it. According to a review on the Lautapeliopas site, the new features increase the randomness and luck factor, and there is no notable effect on the skill involved.

== Video game version ==
Afrikan tähti was made into a video game for the Commodore 64 in 1985 by Otso Pakarinen and Jari Heikkinen who were given permission to make the game from Kari Mannerla. The game was published by Amersoft and produced by Jouko Riikonen. Programming the game took roughly two months. It was made with help of some PROMAL source code which the creators got from Amersoft.

== In other countries ==
The game was launched in Sweden in 1958 by Alga, under the name "Den försvunna diamanten" ("The lost diamond"). In Denmark a variant of the game is marketed by Alga's parent company BRIO under the name "Afrikas Stjerne" (Star of Africa). In Norway the game has been sold under the name "Den forsvunne diamanten" ("The lost diamond") from 1956, and is currently marketed by Egmont. All publishing rights are directly copyrighted to Kari Mannerla's five daughters.
