= Alga (game publisher) =

Swedish game publisher

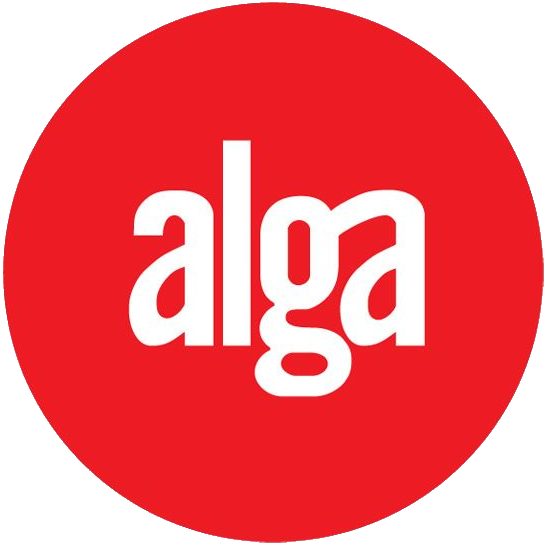
- Industry: Board games
- Founded: 1917 in Stockholm, Sweden
- Parent: Brio; Ravensburger
- Website: www.algaspel.se

Alga AB is a board game publisher founded in Stockholm, Sweden, in 1917, which has produced board games in multiple languages for the Nordic countries. It was formed as a subsidiary of Pressbyrån, a chain of convenience stores. Alga took care of the distribution of postcards and writing materials. In 1938, it started manufacturing board games. In 1940, Pressbyrån itself took over the production of postcards, and the connection between Alga and Pressbyrån was broken by the Bonnier Group, which owned both companies. The old Alga was later transformed into Bokförlaget Forum, while the game production continued under the brand name Alga. It took over the publication of Monopol (Monopoly) from Åhlén & Åkerlund, another Bonnier company.

In the 1960s, the company was modernized with, among other things, the current logo, Alga in white text against a red circle as a background. The company also moved from Stockholm to Vittsjö where a new factory and headquarters were built. At the same time, Alga also became a distributor of toys, including Monchhichi.

Dan Glimne was product development manager at Alga from 1980 to 1989. Alga has been owned by Brio since 1983. The factory in Vittsjö was closed in 2006 and the head office was moved to Malmö. In 2015, Brio and Alga were bought up by German toy manufacturer Ravensburger.

== Games publications (selection) ==
=== Original Swedish designs ===
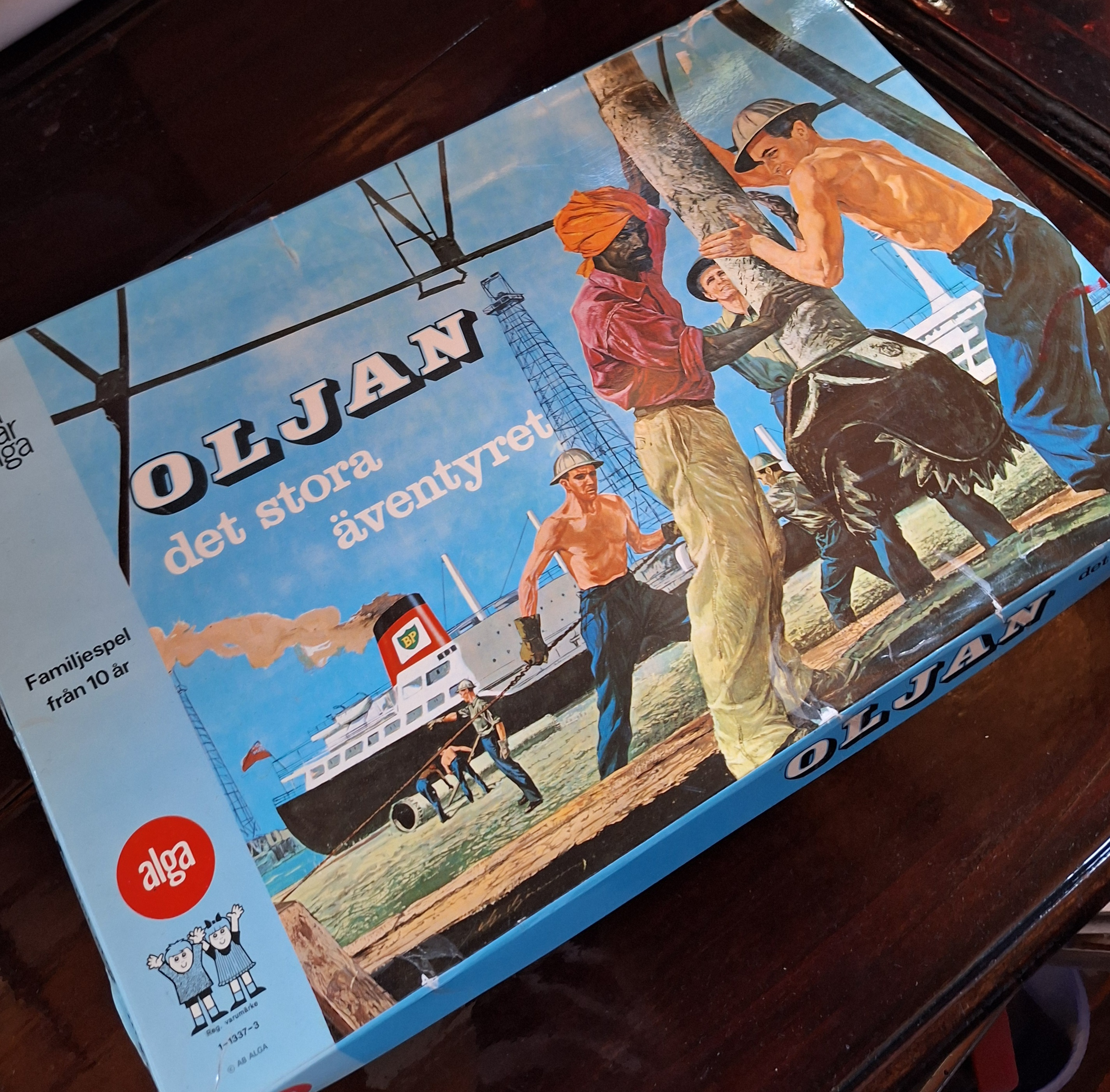
The game box of Oljan showing oil drilling and a BP tanker.

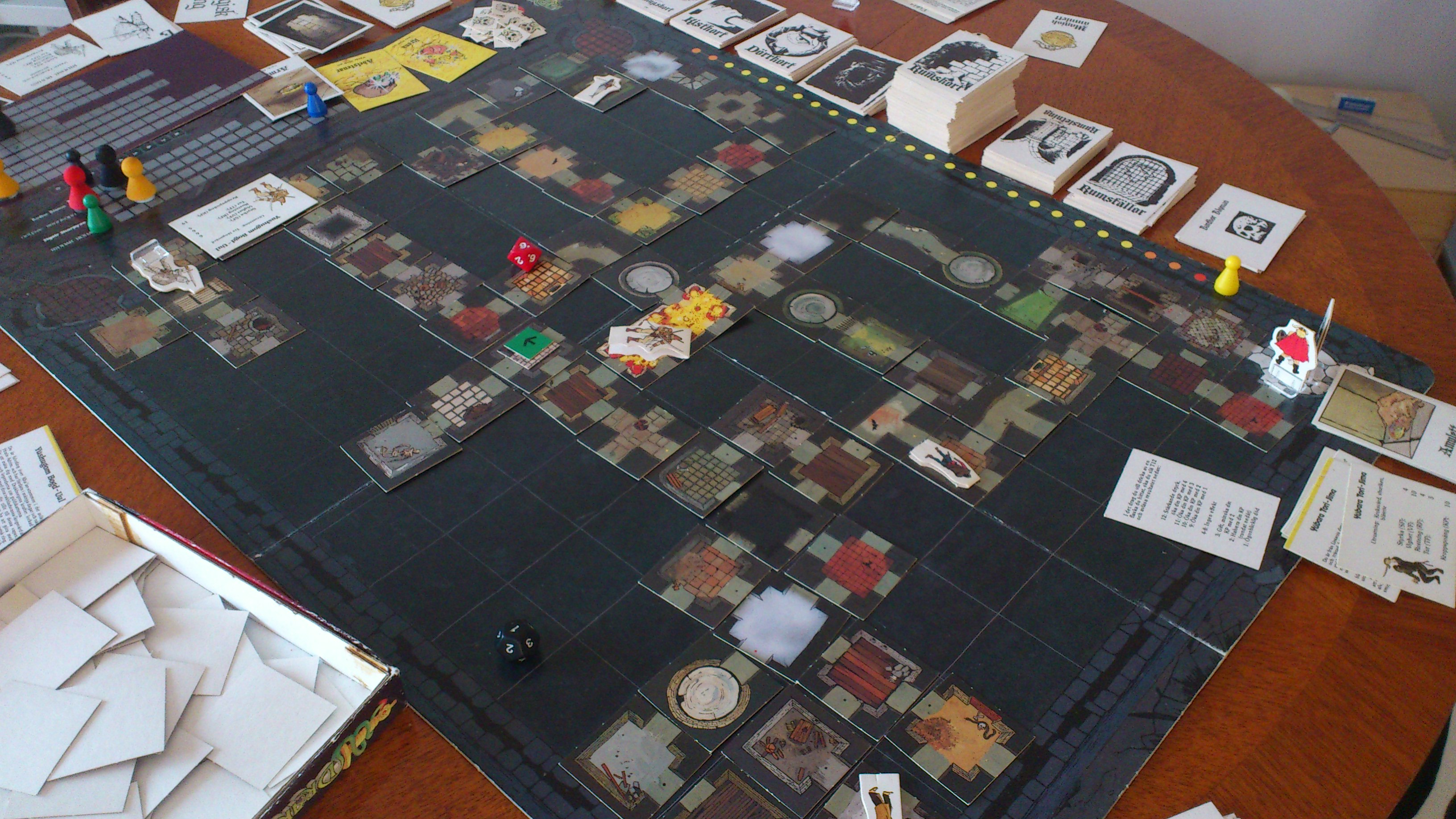
The board after a game of Drakborgen with the expansion, Drakborgen II.

- Bondespelet ("The Farmer Game", taken over from the defunct publisher Aristospel ca. 1974; also published in Danish, Finnish, and Norwegian)
- Drakborgen (1985; later published in English as Dungeonquest)
  - Drakborgen II (1987 expansion set; also published in English as Heroes for Dungeonquest and Dungeonquest Catacombs)
- Jägersro (a horse racing game first published in the 1950s, named for the racing facility in Jägersro)
- Oljan ("The Oil", first published 1960)
- Tjuv och polis ("Thief and police", first published 1943)

=== Games adapted from overseas originals ===
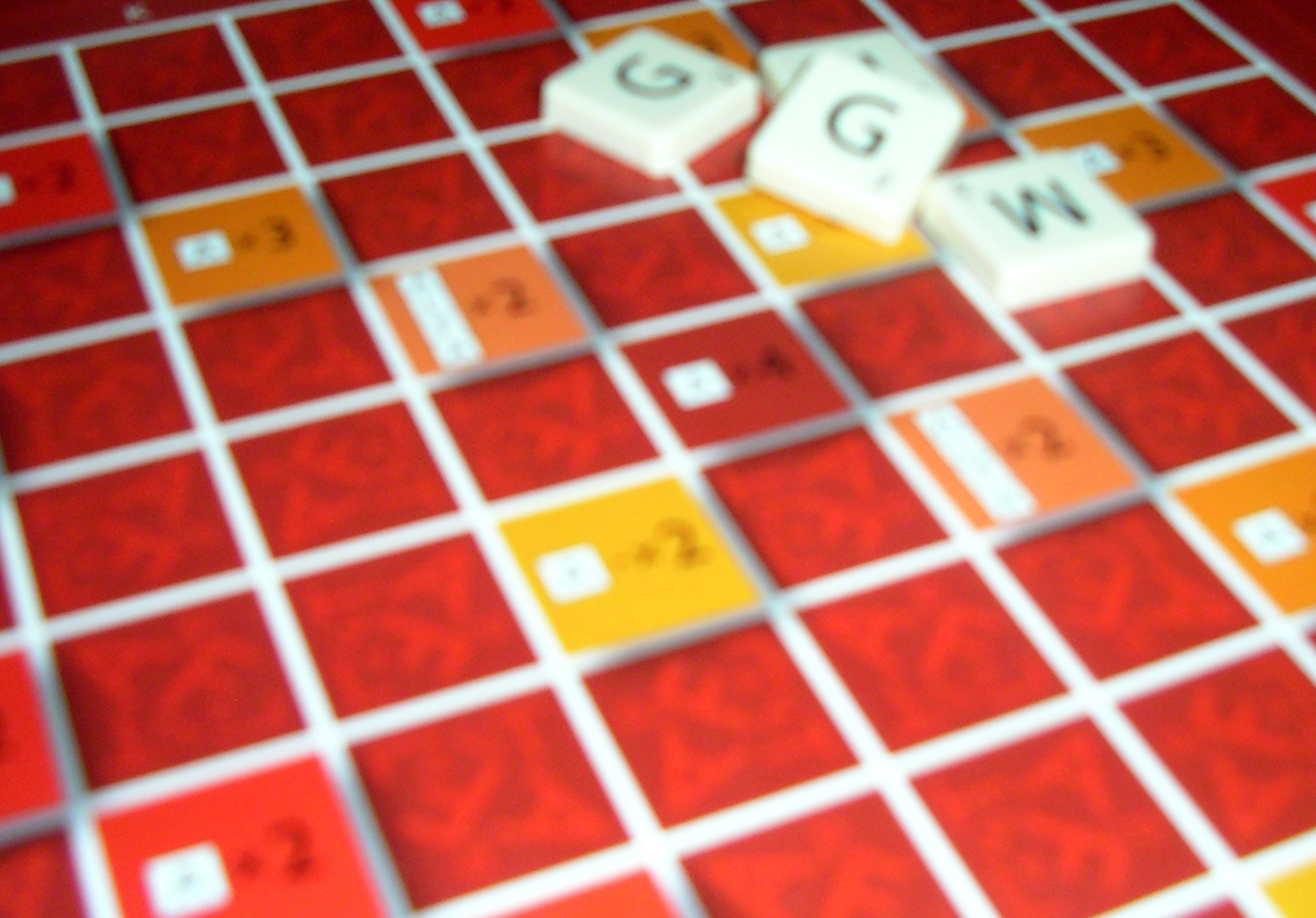
An Alfapet board with a few letter tiles.

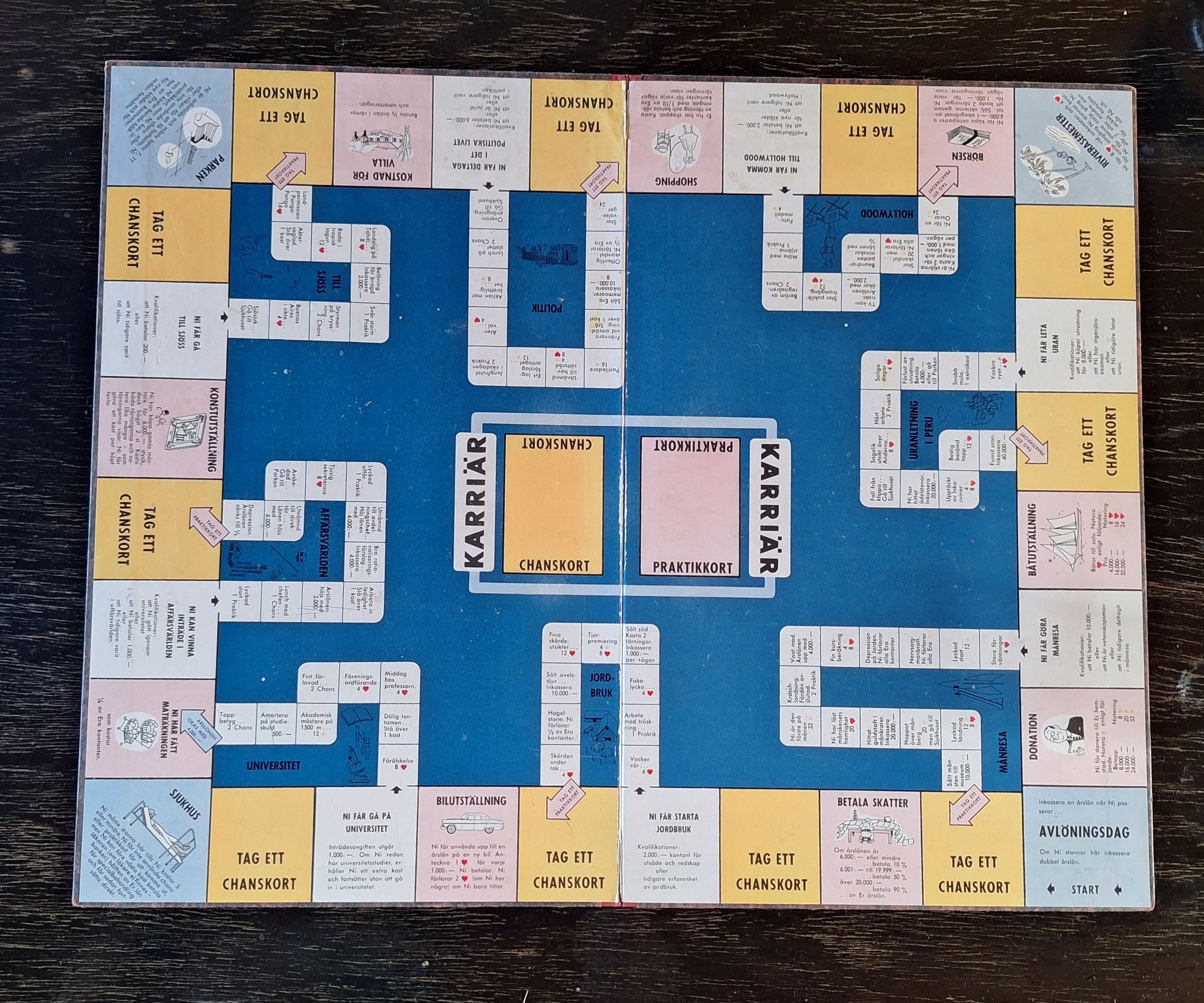
The game board for the first Swedish edition of Karriär.

- Alfapet (Scrabble)
- Cluedo
- Crossbows and Catapults
- Den försvunna diamanten (Afrikan tähti)
- Formula 1
- Girl Talk
- Karriär (Careers)
- Memory (Concentration)
- Monopol (Monopoly; ca. 1938-1978)
  - Matador (Danish derivation of Monopoly with a circular track; taken over by Brio in the 1970s and continues to be marketed by Alga as Brio's board game subsidiary)
- Rack-O
- Rail (Railway Rivals)
- Risk
- 2001: the space age game (Domain)
- Table Soccer
- Yatzy

=== Traditional board games ===
- Backgammon
- Chess
- Chinese checkers
- Fia (Mensch ärgere Dich nicht)
- Gomoku
- Hnefatafl
- Mancala
- Peg solitaire
- Reversi

=== Games based on TV series ===
- Fem myror är fler än fyra elefanter
- Kojak (from an English-language original published by Milton Bradley)
- Mysteriet på Greveholm
- Teletubbies
- Vem vill bli miljonär? (Who Wants to Be a Millionaire?)
