= Heroes for Dungeonquest =

Board game supplement

Heroes for Dungeonquest is a supplement published by Games Workshop (GW) in 1987 for the fantasy board game Dungeonquest.

== Contents ==
Heroes for Dungeonquest is the first expansion set that was published for Dungeonquest, adding twelve new heroes with new mechanics and special abilities, and a handful of additional cards and tokens. Twelve metal miniatures from Citadel Miniatures were also included in the game.

This is only an expansion and is not playable on its own; the original game is required for play.

== Publication history ==
GW's Dungeonquest boardgame is an English-language translation of the Swedish game Drakborgen (Dragon Fortress) created by Jakob Bonds and Dan Glimne, and published by Alga AB in 1985. Alga released an expansion called Drakborgen II in 1987. GW published an English-language version of this expansion, but divided it into two supplements:

- Heroes for Dungeonquest (1987)
- Dungeonquest Catacombs (1988), which adds another 20 room tiles, as well as 28 additional cards for monsters, encounters and objects. This expansion also adds the ability for players to travel underneath the main game board.

== Reception ==
Reviewer John Woods for The Games Machine had not been impressed with the original game, feeling that the inherent randomness of events trumped any player skill. In reviewing the Heroes for Dungeonquest expansion, he found it similarly flawed: "Whilst the game is fun to play a few times, there's very little depth to it and even worse no scope at all for cooperation or enmity between different PCs." He also questioned the relatively expensive price tag, and the inclusion of metal miniatures, which he surmised must be the reason for the high cost.
