= Hitchball 4000 =

Hitchball 4000 is the biggest hitchhiking race in the Nordic countries, organized during the first weekend of June. It is a weekend-long race where teams of two people hitchhike away from Helsinki and back. Each team is equipped with a GPS tracker, which enables their progress to be followed in real-time on the competition's website. The winner of the main competition is the team that hitchhikes the longest distance and gets the furthest possible during the weekend, but also gets back to the starting point before the following Monday morning. The Spirit of Hitchball award is given to the team that has done the best promotion of hitchhiking through their attitude and their storytelling in social media.

The competition is organized by HitchPro ry, an association aiming at spreading the hitchhiking culture and values. The aim of the event is to promote hitchhiking as a legitimate means of transportation and to spread values such as trust, sustainability and open-mindedness, as well as to demonstrate the safety of the Northern European societies. Hitchball 4000 has managed to raise awareness about hitchhiking in the Finnish mainstream media, with for instance leading newspaper Helsingin Sanomat and commercial TV channel MTV3 filming the start of the race and leading radio channel YleX broadcasting live reports of the 2016 edition of the race. General public awareness about the race and orange race bibs worn by participants may influence drivers to stop easier. Hitchball 4000 aims thus at generating hundreds of first experiences about hitchhiking every year, both from the hitchhiker and the driver point of views, which over time would make hitchhiking more commonplace.

Hitchball 4000 was organized for the first time in 2013. The popularity of the race has steadily increased every year and the 2016 edition gathered over 100 participants. During the first four editions, participants have reached places as distant from Helsinki as Stryków, Warsaw, Nordkjosbotn, Stockholm, Inari and Muonio.

In 2017 a special edition was held to celebrate the 100 years of independence of Finland and to pay tribute to the country's most famous board game, Afrikan tähti. Over 150 participants had to hitchhike to 55 different locations of historical, cultural, industrial or natural importance and complete various challenges that were documented through dedicated Facebook pages. The race was part of the official programme of the Finland 100 anniversary.
