= Rack-O =

Sequential-matching card game

The Classic Rack 'Em and Score Card Game!
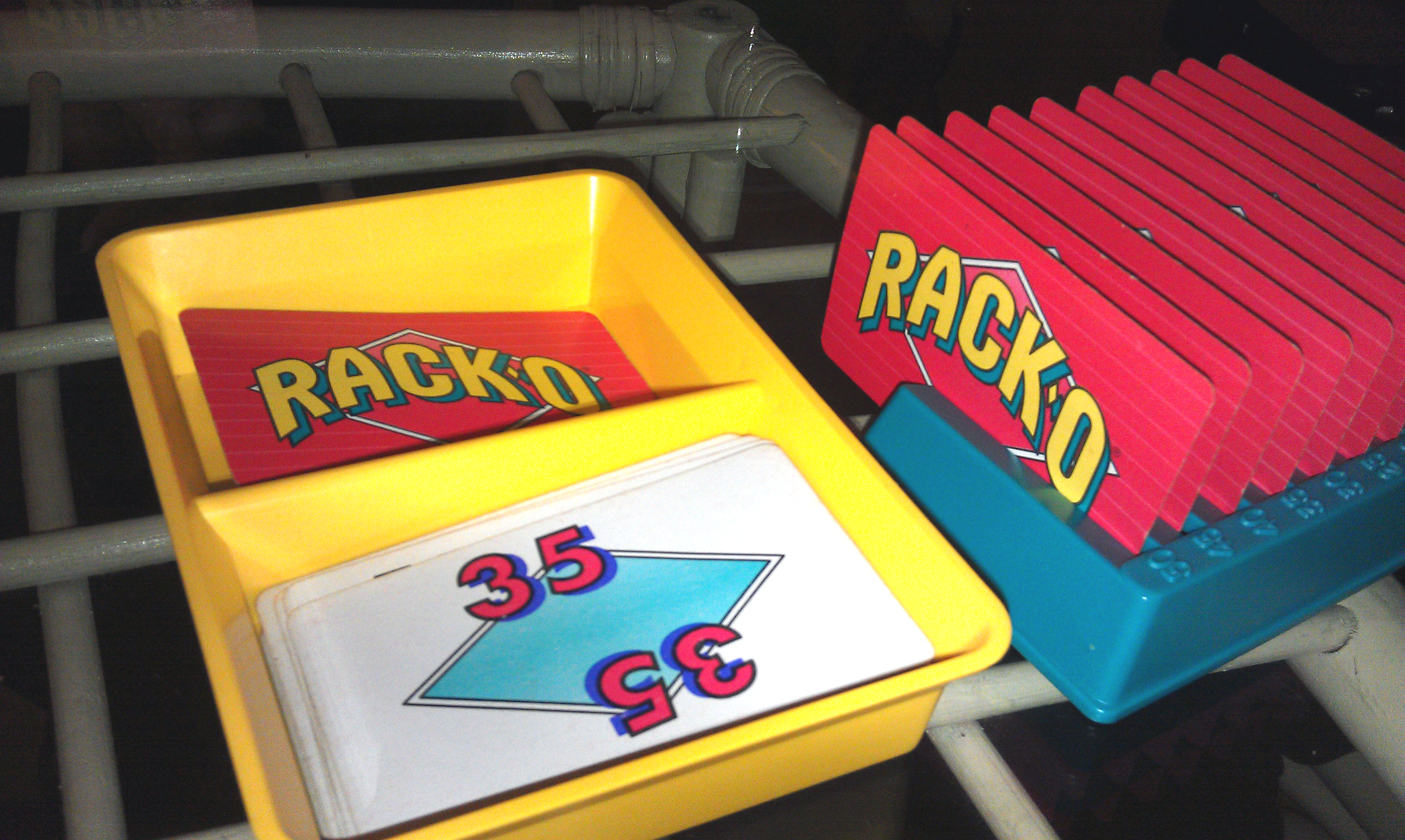
- Traditional set-up of a game of Rack-o.
- Publishers: Alga (Brio), Grow Jogos e Brinquedos, Hasbro, Jumbo, Milton Bradley, Nathan, Parker Brothers, Ravensburger, and Winning Moves Games USA
- Players: 2–4
- Setup time: 1 minute
- Playing time: 45 minutes
- Chance: Medium
- Age range: 8 and up
- Skills: Counting, Sequence

Rack-O is a Milton Bradley sequential-matching card game with the objective of obtaining 10 numbers, in numerical order, in one's hand. Score may be kept on a separate piece of paper, based upon either a custom system or the system provided in the rule book. Rack-O allows between 2–4 players, and is recommended for players age 8 and up. Rack-O was released in 1956 and is currently produced by Winning Moves Games USA.

== Game play ==
The deck consists of 60 cards, each containing a number from 1 to 60. Depending on how many people are playing, the deck may be reduced in size. If two people are playing, only the cards from 1 to 40 are used; if three people are playing, the cards from 1 to 50 are used; and if four people are playing, the entire deck is used. Each player has a rack containing 10 slots to hold their cards.

A dealer shuffles the cards and deals 10 to each player. A player must place each card as it is received into the highest available slot in their rack, starting at slot #10, without rearranging any of them. The goal of each hand is to create a sequence of numbers in ascending order, starting at slot #1.

The top card of the deck is turned over to start the discard pile. A player takes a turn by taking the top card from either the deck or the discard pile, then discarding one from their rack and inserting the new card in its place. A player who draws the top card from the deck may immediately discard it; however, when a player takes the top discard, they must put it in their rack and discard a different one.

The first player to get 10 cards in ascending order calls "Rack-O!" and wins the hand.

=== Point system ===
While it is very easy to play with a custom point system or none at all, the game has a default described in the rulebook:

The winner of a hand scores 75 points. Other players receive 5 points for each card they have in ascending order, starting at slot #1 and ending when the sequence breaks. The first player to score 500 points wins the game.

An optional scoring system is "Bonus Rack-O", which awards extra points to the winner of the hand for having a sequence of consecutive numbers (such as 7, 8, 9). Sequences of 3, 4, 5, or 6 cards award 50, 100, 200, or 400 points, respectively.

== Reception ==
Games included Rack-O in its top 100 games of 1986, saying, "For two players, we recommend that each use two racks simultaneously, arranging cards in either of them on a turn."

== Reviews ==
- 1980 Games 100 in Games
