= Inkan aarre =

Finnish board game

- Designers: Kari Mannerla
- Publication: 2005; 20 years ago
- Genres: Board game

Inkan aarre (Finnish for "The treasure of the Inca") is a 2005 Finnish board game, designed by Kari Mannerla as a direct sequel to his 1951 board game Afrikan tähti.

== Game play ==
Inkan aarre is mostly similar to Afrikan tähti. Players take turns to move around a board of interconnected cities, picking up tokens in search for the famous treasure of the Inca, a golden sun god statue.

The board represents the continent of South America, and the currency used is the Mexican peso. All players start from Rio de Janeiro, Brazil. Once the treasure of the Inca has been found, the first player to take either the treasure or a sun icon to Machu Picchu, Peru, wins the game.

=== Differences from Afrikan tähti ===
- The game now has one starting location (Rio de Janeiro) and one ending location (Machu Picchu); these are not interchangeable.
- The Native American guide is a new token.
- The rule that players can travel on the sea for free if they have no money has been made official.
