= Bengt Magnusson =

Swedish journalist

- Born: Bengt Robert Rickard Magnusson; 26 November 1950 (age 75); Ystad, Sweden
- Notable credit(s): Hosting news programs and game shows

Bengt Magnusson (born 26 November 1950, in Ystad) is a Swedish journalist and a TV presenter at TV4.

Magnusson studied at Journalisthögskolan i Stockholm (Journalist School of Stockholm) and was employed at the Sveriges Radio (Swedish Radio) in 1973. In the late 1970s, he worked for Sveriges Radio Stockholm (Swedish Radio Stockholm) and came in 1979 to TV and Sveriges Television, where he worked in TV-sporten program. In 1985 Magnusson moved to host the Rapport, where he stayed until 1987 when he moved to host Stockholm regional news in ABC-nytt program in TV2.

In 1990 Magnusson moved to the newly established commercial channel TV4 to work as a news presenter. In September 1990, he led the first broadcast of Nyheterna program. In 1992 TV4 started broadcasting breakfast television program, Nyhetsmorgon, which was hosted by Magnusson and Malou von Sivers. Since autumn 2005, he is the main host for the news broadcast at 7 PM on Sunday-Thursday evenings.

He has also hosted several other programs, such as På liv och död (Rescue 911), Jakten på den röda rubinen (Hunt for the red ruby) and Vem vill bli miljonär? (Who Wants to Be a Millionaire?).
