= Pressbyrån =

Chain of convenience stores in Sweden

- Industry: Retail
- Founded: 1899
- Headquarters: Stockholm, Sweden
- Area served: Sweden
- Owner: Reitan Group
- Website: www.pressbyran.se

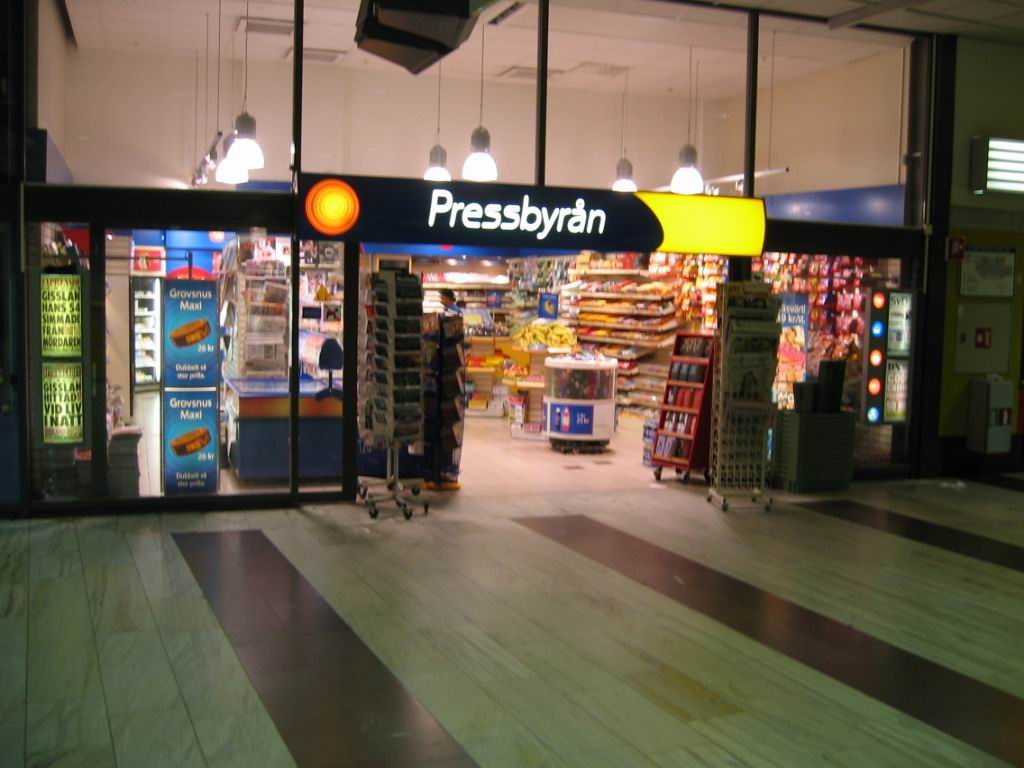
A Pressbyrån store in Stockholm Central Station

Pressbyrån (lit. 'The Press Bureau') is a chain of convenience stores in Sweden that sells magazines and newspapers, convenience foods such as chilled drinks, potato chips, candies, ice cream, hot dogs, tobacco and snus products, as well as weaker alcoholic drinks (up to 3.5% ABV; under Swedish law, stronger alcoholic drinks can only be legally sold by the Systembolaget alcohol monopoly). They also sell tickets for public transport, prepaid SIM cards, top-ups and stamps. Stores are often located adjacent to metro stations, commuter railway stations and bus terminals.

== History ==
The company was founded in 1899, and started out by selling newspapers in railway stations.

In 1917, Pressbyrån started a subsidiary Alga to manufacture postcards and stationery. The name derives from the initials of the two directors' wives: Anna Lundquist and Anna Gadh. Alga later developed into a major publisher of board games in Sweden, was spun off as an independent company by Pressbyrån's owner Bonnier Group in 1940, and was acquired by BRIO in 1983.

It has since grown to around 300 stores, all franchised, and is now owned by the Reitan Group, which also owns the Swedish, Danish and Norwegian rights to franchise its historical direct competitor 7-Eleven. Since the 2010s, both brands have faced increased competition from new convenience store chains such as Circle K, Direkten and MyWay.

On 11 July 2020, Pressbyrån opened its first automated convenience store called Pressbyrån Go in a small section of an existing staffed store in Kungsholmen, Stockholm. The first true standalone Pressbyrån Go store opened just outside Westfield Mall of Scandinavia on 19 January 2021.

In May 2024, the Reitan Group announced its intention to stop selling cigarettes in its Swedish stores, including Pressbyrån, by 2026.
