= Domain (game) =

Abstract strategy game

- Other names: Boomerang; Chameleon; Kiss; 2001: The space age game
- Publishers: Nathan; Waddingtons; Editrice Giochi; Alga; Parker Brothers
- Publication: 1982; 44 years ago
- Genres: Abstract strategy game; Tile-based game
- Players: 2
- Playing time: 15 minutes
- Age range: 8+

Domain (also known as Boomerang, Chameleon, Kiss, or 2001: the space age game) is a tile-based abstract strategy game first published throughout Europe in 1982. Players place multicoloured polyomino tiles on a game board and flip any of their opponent's pieces adjacent to them in order to have the most squares covered by their colour at the end of the game.

== Publication history ==
Domain was first marketed around Europe in 1982 under various names. It was published in France by Nathan as Boomerang, in Britain by Waddingtons as Chameleon, in Italy by Editrice Giochi as Kiss, and in Sweden by Alga as 2001: the space age game, although it is unknown who designed it.

In 1983, the game was published in North America by Parkers Brothers, with the name Domain and the slogan “Where the Challenge is...”.

== Gameplay ==
Domain is played on a 9x9 game board using 26 polyomino tiles, which are each one of eight different shapes labelled from 2 to 5 corresponding to its number of squares. In Domain, the pieces are white on one side and blue on the other, although the two colours differ depending on the edition.

Both players are assigned colours and take turns placing one tile with their colour face-up onto the game board. Any pieces of their opponent's colour which are non-diagonally adjacent to the placed piece are flipped. Play continues back and forth until no more pieces can be played. The winner is the player whose coloured tiles cover the most squares.

=== Variations ===
There are two main variations to the game. In the first, the tiles are divided between the players so that each has an identical set of 13 pieces. On their turn, a player must place a tile such that it flips at least one piece. The second variation utilizes the rules from the first, but players flip all pieces that touch their placed piece, regardless of colour, instead of solely flipping adjacent pieces of their opponent's colour.

== Reception ==
Sid Sackson, writing for Issue #37 of Games, praised Domain's rules, stating that "the rules are a simple but ingenious blend of elements of [Reversi] and Pentominoes." The game was also featured in Games's 1983 and 1984 Games 100.

Jeux & Stratégie reviewed Boomerang in Issue #16, praising it for its simple but effective design reminiscent of Reversi and Nim. In Issue #12 of Abstract Strategy, Larry Black analyzed the game's strategy and concluded that "all in all, Domain is a very enjoyable game. It is over quickly and yet there are many choices for each of your moves. Finding your best move is rarely easy."
