= Crossbows and Catapults =

Board game

Crossbows and Catapults, also known as Battlegrounds, is a game of physical skill first released in 1983. It has since been published by several different game publishers including Lakeside, Alga (Brio), Base Toys, Tomy and currently Moose Toys (under the name Battlegrounds Crossbows and Catapults). In the game, two sides, originally Vikings and Barbarians but later other names were used, build fortifications from plastic bricks and then attempt to destroy the other's castle with rubber-band powered crossbows (similar to ballistae) and catapults firing plastic disks. In the most recent version, launched in 2007, the two sides were Orcs and Knights.

In the Tomy version, the two armies are called the Impalers of the Clannic Shelf and the Doomlords of Gulch. The Impalers inhabit the Clannic Shelf, a large floating rock island 500 metres above the surface of Otherworld. The shelf has a gravitational effect on the Doomlords, causing them to have a shorter, squatter frame than the Impalers.

== Rules and play ==
=== Tomy (1983) version ===
Gameplay

Players set the opposing game mats on opposite ends of a flat surface. Players place their tower over the treasure graphic in the center of the mat, and build a wall around their tower using their twelve wall pieces. A flag is placed on top of the tower, and also on the far left and right sides of the field of play, outlining what will be considered "castle grounds". The play area should be 6 feet long and 5 feet wide, with 1 foot at each end used for the castle grounds.

Players take turns using either the crossbow or catapult to attack the opposing player's castle. The weapons shoot the disc-like "caroms". Crossbows slide the caroms across the gameplay surface, whilst catapults fling the caroms in a wide arc. Players must choose which weapon to use to attack.

Landing the caroms in different places of the playing field leads to differing results. Landing on the moat or castle grounds gets the carom captured and removed from play. Landing on the tower island turns the carom into a "spy", and it gets replaced with a corresponding figure. Landing in the battlefield allows the player to fire from that point, improving their chances of doing some damage to the opponents tower. Hitting an opponent's carom captures it. Landing "out of bounds" (outside of the play area marked by the flags) allows the projectile to be recovered by the player.

There is also a "king" carom for each team. King caroms allow players to capture more opponents, and can only themselves be captured by a king carom.

There are four different ways to win: 1) Knock over the enemy tower; 2) Capture all of your opponents projectiles; 3) Get four spies into the enemy courtyard; 4) Knock the enemy tower over/out of the way, and land a projectile (spy) on the secret treasure beneath it.

Players are also encouraged to pick one or more winning goals, or use their imagination to create their own set of rules.

=== Battlegrounds (2007) version ===
Several Crossbows and Catapults sets mixed together

Measure out a width of 39 inches and length of 59 inches on the floor/table. This will be the play area. Measure out twelve inches from each side of the area. This area will be the players' camps.

Players then set up their camp. The only rule regarding piece placement is that no Hero or Warrior may be obstructed from your opponent's view by a weapon or building (does not include brick walls).

Play begins with the Orcs attacking first. Each player has only two actions per turn. One action consists of either moving a warrior, hero or weapon or firing a weapon. Once a weapon is fired, it may not be fired again in the same turn.

Piece movement: Movement distance for pieces is easy to remember. Warriors and weapons can move only six inches per action. Heroes can move 12 inches.

Weapon rules: Before a player can fire a weapon, they must determine if the weapon is capable of being fired. A hero or warrior must be within two inches of a weapon to fire it. They can not be behind the weapon.

Qualification for piece removal after each turn: If a piece is lying on its side, the piece is removed. If a piece is bumped, it is left alone. If a Hero is killed before all the warriors are eliminated, the hero is put back into place; the player who owned the hit hero will lose an action on their next turn.

The game is over when all a player's warriors and then the hero have been killed.

== Reviews ==
- Family Games: The 100 Best
