= Kari Mannerla =

Finnish game designer (1930-2006)

Kari Mannerla (9 January 1930, Helsinki, Finland – 12 July 2006, Helsinki, Finland) was a Finnish board and card game designer and advertising agency executive. The most famous game he designed is the board game Afrikan tähti (The Star of Africa), the idea of which he began to develop in 1949. The game was published two years later. Mannerla made up the name of the game when reading an article about the biggest diamond in the world, the Star of Africa, discovered in South Africa.

Apart from the board game, Mannerla also designed the Afrikan tähti card play version. He also designed the board game Inkan aarre (Treasure of the Inca), which was published in 2005. It is similar to Afrikan tähti, but takes place in South America. Earlier, Mannerla also designed solitaire card games and adventure party games. He was also involved in developing scratchcards for Veikkaus.

Mannerla made a career in an advertising agency and retired as the chairman of the board of directors. He died of cancer on 12 July 2006 at age 76.
