= Dungeonquest =

Fantasy adventure board game

- Dungeonquest as published by Games Workshop
- Designers: Dan Glimne; Jakob Bonds
- Publishers: Brio AB; Games Workshop; Schmidt Spiele
- Players: 1-4
- Setup time: 10 minutes
- Playing time: 1 hour
- Chance: High
- Skills: Strategic planning

Dungeonquest (sometimes known as Dungeon Quest) is a fantasy adventure board game originally published in Sweden in 1985 by Alga AB as Drakborgen, and subsequently published in English by Games Workshop in 1987.

== Description ==
The objective of this game for 1–4 players is to enter the ruins of Dragonfire Castle at dawn when the castle's guardian dragon falls asleep, navigate a labyrinth to the dragon's hoard at the center of the castle, and exit the castle. The game ends at sunset; any characters still in the castle at that point are automatically killed by the dragon. The player who successfully escapes from the castle with the largest amount of treasure is the winner.

=== Components ===
The Games Workshop version of the game includes:

- 20-page rulebook
- 6-piece gameboard
- 115 room tiles, counters and tokens
- 174 playing cards
- dice
- 4 plastic miniatures

=== Gameplay ===
The board, marked by a grid, begins blank except for the dragon's hoard at the center. Room tiles are placed facedown near the board, and the time track counter is set to "Dawn". During each player's turn, the player selects a room tile at random and sets it down on a grid space on the board. Each tile may be one of several different configurations: a room with several doorways, a corner, a hallway, a dead end, a bottomless pit, a rotating room, etc. In all, the game contains 115 room tiles. When a player's character enters a room, the player draws a card to determine the type of challenge that must be overcome. This can include monsters, chasms, crypts, traps, secret doors, etc.

== Publication history ==
Jakob Bonds created the concept of Drakborgen (Dragon Fortress) while in high school in Sweden. In the early 1980s, he submitted the game to Alga AB for consideration. Dan Glimne, who had been working at Alga since 1980, was also working on a fantasy board game with a similar theme titled Trollkarlens borg. (The Wizard's Castle) Both Bonds and Glimne felt a "family fantasy" board game was needed, and they agreed to merge their two game ideas and jointly develop the new project. The result was Drakborgen, published in 1985 with illustrations by Anders Jeppson.

Games Workshop published an English-language version titled Dungeonquest in 1987 that included four plastic miniatures produced by Citadel Miniatures.

In Sweden, Alga AB released an expansion called Drakborgen II in 1987. Games Workshop also published this expansion, but divided it into two supplements:

- Heroes for Dungeonquest (1987) adds twelve new heroes with new mechanics and special abilities, a handful of additional cards and tokens, and twelve metal miniatures from Citadel.
- Dungeonquest Catacombs (1988), adds another 20 room tiles, as well as 28 additional cards for monsters, encounters and objects. This expansion also adds the ability for players to travel underneath the main game board, albeit without any accompanying catacombs game board.

Fantasy Flight Games introduced a new version of the English-language game at Gen Con in 2010.

The Swedish edition is still being published by Alga as Drakborgen: Legenden ("Dragon Fortress: The Legend").

== Reception ==
In the April 1991 edition of Dragon (Issue 168), Ken Rolston liked the high production standard of the components and the simple rules, but commented on the relative lethality of the game: "It is tough enough to get out alive with any treasure at all, much less to be successful in snatching gold from the dragon's treasure chamber before he awakes and bakes you. If you are playing socially and are more interested in getting out alive than in winning by grabbing the most loot, a conservative player can generally get his character out in one piece. But hard-nosed adventurers aiming for a big haul from the dragon's hoard will die like flies." He also mildly criticized the game for making random draws the determining factor in winning. But he concluded with a strong recommendation, saying, "Play is tense, suspenseful, and exciting, since the objectives are extremely difficult, and death is swift. The importance of good luck and the distraction of the vivid dungeon setting help suppress competitive impulses, making the Dungeonquest game quite comfortable for social play."

In Issue 4 of The Games Machine, John Woods found his attention starting to flag as the game progressed, commenting "I'm afraid your problem won't be so much trying not to wake the dragon up as keeping awake yourself long enough to reach it..." He did like the quality of the components, and thought the game started off well enough. But Woods found random chance was much more important than player skill, and concluded, "the randomness of life in these dungeons means there's no compulsion to play after the novelty has worn off. [...] It's a pity such an attractively-produced package doesn't have more lasting appeal."

== Reviews ==
- Casus Belli #43 (Feb 1988)
- Games #92
- Isaac Asimov's Science Fiction Magazine v12 n9 (1988 09)
- Australian Realms #5

== See also ==
- The Sorcerer's Cave, another game where the game map is randomly generated during play.
- Talisman, a game where the game board itself is fixed, but contents are revealed during play.
