= Girl Talk (board game) =

Board game introduced in 1988

- Other names: Jentesnakk; Secrets & Folie's
- Designers: Catherine Rondeau
- Illustrators: Bildgården AB; Anders Jeppsson
- Publishers: Alga; Hasbro Golden
- Publication: 1988; 38 years ago
- Years active: 1988–?
- Genres: Board game
- Languages: English
- Players: 2–10
- Playing time: 60'
- Age range: 8+

Related games
- Truth or Dare

Girl Talk, a board game invented by Catherine Rondeau in 1988, became a popular game for teenage girls throughout the 1990s. It is similar to the parlour game Truth or Dare and features themes such as boys, talking on the phone, dancing, having parties and sleepovers, and other "girl-ish" concerns for the time.

== Gameplay ==
The game comes with an opaque spinner with a hole in it, and multiple exchangeable cardboard circles which can be placed into the spinner. The spinner would land on either a question or a "dare". Each action (or question) is worth a certain number of points. If a player does not perform the action or answer a question they must wear a "zit sticker" for the rest of the game. Players may use their points to buy one of four kinds of fortune cards; the first to collect one of all four types is the winner.

== Variants ==
- Girl Talk: A Game of Truth or Dare (original)
- Girl Talk: Secret Diary
- Girl Talk: Date Line
- Girl Talk: The CD-ROM Game
- That's So Raven Girl Talk (2000s, not part of the original set)
- Hannah Montana Girl Talk (2000s, not part of the original set)
- Jenga Girl Talk (2000s, not part of the original set) (this had both a pink and an 'Ultimate' red edition)
- Girl Talk: "One Direction edition"

Note: This list is not complete.

== Video game ==
A video game adaptation was released in 1998, developed by Human Code and published by Hasbro Interactive. It features songs by Backstreet Boys and Britney Spears.
