= Dan Glimne =

Swedish games expert and game designer (born 1947)

- Born: 27 April 1947
- Notable work: Drakborgen · Svea Rike
- Occupation: games expert · games inventor · poker player
- Life partner: Ingrid Jerneborg Glimne
- Sports career
- Sport: Poker
- Event: Texas Hold'em
- Sports career

Sports achievements and titles
- World finals: 534h in World Championship 2008
- National finals: 3rd in Swedish Championsip 2011

Dan Ejde Gustaf Glimne (born 1947), is a Swedish games expert, game designer and poker player.

== Life ==
Glimne was born on 27 April 1947. After studying at Lund University of Technology, Glimne became the product development manager at Alga in 1980–1989 and subsequently worked as his own entrepreneur and consultant. He has edited and constructed a very large number of games, and has periodically been Sweden's only professional game designer. He has also written several books about games, participated as a game expert in encyclopaedias, such as Bra Böckers Lexikon (Good Books Lexicon), the Nationalencyklopedin (Swedish National Encyclopedia) and Myggans nöjeslexikon (Myggan's Entertainment Lexicon), and commented on poker on television. His game, Ostindiska Kompaniet was Swedish game of the year in 1992.

Glimne has also been politically active and is a candidate for the Moderate Party in the Swedish Parliament. He has been married since 2001 to Ingrid Jerneborg Glimne, local politician for the Moderates in Gnesta municipality. Together they reside in Gnesta.

== Designed games (selection) ==
=== Board games ===
- Batavia
- Binary Dice
- Drakborgen (with Jakob Bonds)
- Drakborgen II
- DungeonQuest
- Emil i Lönneberga - Ett hyss-spel från Alga
- Fantomen
- Goliat - En festlig helsvensk figur på äventyr i stenåldern!
- Geni 2000
- Gibberish
- Joakim von Ankas fantastiska affärer
- Jorden runt på 80 dagar
- Knorr (reklamspel för livsmedel)
- Kurt Olsson
- Mika (the game from the TV series)
- MasterQuiz
- Microchess
- Ostindiska kompaniet
- Personality
- SportQuiz
- Stadens nyckel (published by Casper)
- Svea Rike
- Svea Rike Batalj - Expansion No. 1
- Sätt sprätt på en miljon
- Stoppa pressarna
- Travspelet
- Årets spel

=== Card games ===
- Valkampanj - a game of perfect information for 3-6 players
- Ben Johnsons dopingspel
- Nasdaq
- Skattepolitik
- Korruption
- Fibonacci-regering
- Auktionsrummy
- Blindwhist

== Books (selection) ==
- Nya spel (B. Wahlströms, 1994)
- Pokerhandboken (B. Wahlströms, 1995), 2nd edn. 2002, 3rd edn. 2005
- Kortspelshandboken (B. Wahlströms, 1996), ISBN 91-32-32121-X
- Pirayaklubbens handbok (Tago Förlag, 1997)
- Spel med knappar (BonnierCarlsen, 1998)
- Trixa med knappar (BonnierCarlsen, 1998)
- 100 kortspel & trick (Frida Förlag, 1998), ISBN 91-973473-0-2
- Världens största svindlare (Frida Förlag, 2002)
- Kasinohandboken
- Hur man kör miniracing (Allt om hobby AB, 1968-01), ISBN 91-49-01482-X

== Biographical source ==
- "Medarbetare i Myggans Nöjeslexikon" i Myggans Nöjeslexikon, Vol. 9 (Höganäs 1991), page 255.
