= Racetrack (game) =

Paper-and-pencil game

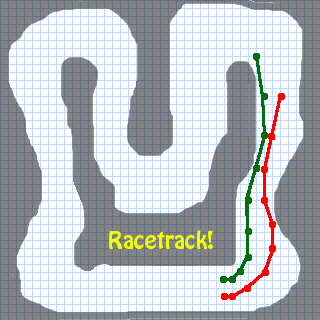
An example racetrack game with first few moves by two players

Racetrack is a paper and pencil game that simulates a car race, played by two or more players. The game is played on a squared sheet of paper, with a pencil line tracking each car's movement. The rules for moving represent a car with a certain inertia and physical limits on traction, and the resulting line is reminiscent of how real racing cars move. The game requires players to slow down before bends in the track, and requires some foresight and planning for successful play. The game is popular as an educational tool teaching vectors.

The game is also known under names such as Vector Formula, Vector Rally, Vector Race, Graph Racers, PolyRace, Paper and pencil racing, or the Graph paper race game.

== The basic game ==
The rules are here explained in simple terms. As will follow from a later section, if the mathematical concept of vectors is known, some of the rules may be stated more briefly. The rules may also be stated in terms of the physical concepts velocity and acceleration.

=== The track ===
On a sheet of quadrille paper ("quad pad", e.g. Letter preprinted with a 1/4" square grid, or A4 with a 5 mm square grid), a freehand loop is drawn as the outer boundary of the racetrack. A large ellipse will do for a first game, but some irregularities are needed to make the game interesting. Another freehand loop is drawn inside the first. It can be more or less parallel with the outer loop, or the track can have wider and narrower spots (pinch spots), with usually at least two squares between the loops. A straight starting and finishing line is drawn across the two loops, and a direction for the race is chosen (e.g., counter clockwise).

=== Preparing to play ===
The order of players is agreed upon. Each player chooses a color or mark (such as x and o) to represent the player's car. Each player marks a starting point for their car - a grid intersection at or behind the starting line.

=== The moves ===
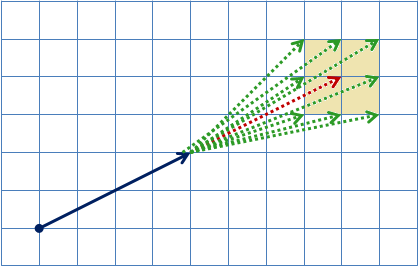
One move in the graph paper game Racetrack. The player's previous move is shown in blue; their next move may be to the principal point marked in red, or to any of its surrounding squares, shown in green.

All moves will be from one grid point to another grid point. Each grid point has eight neighbouring grid points: Up, down, left, right, and the four diagonal directions. Players take turns to move their cars according to some simple rules. Each move is marked by drawing a line from the starting point of this move to a new point.

- Each player's first move must be to one of the eight neighbours of their starting position. (The player can also choose to stand still.)
- On each turn after that, the player can choose to move the same number of squares in the same direction as on the previous turn; the grid point reached by this move is called the principal point for this turn. (E.g., if the previous move was four squares to the right and two squares upwards, then the principal point is found by moving another four squares to the right and two more squares upwards.) However, the player also has the choice of any of the eight neighbours of this principal point.
- Cars must stay within the boundaries of the racetrack; otherwise they crash.

=== Finding a winner ===
The winner is the first player to complete a lap (cross the finish line).

== Additional and alternative rules ==
Combining the following rules in various ways, there are many variants of the game.

=== The track ===
The track need not be a closed curve; the starting and finishing lines could be different.

Before starting to play, the players may go over the track, agreeing in advance about each grid point near the boundaries as to whether that point is inside or outside the track.

Alternatively, the track may be drawn with straight lines only, with corners at grid points only. This removes the need to decide dubious points. Players may or may not be allowed to touch the walls, but not to cross them.

=== The moves ===
Instead of allowing moves to any of eight neighbours of the principal point, one may use the four neighbours rule, limiting moves to the principal point or any of its four nearest neighbours.

When drawing the track, slippery regions with oil spill may be marked, wherein the cars cannot change velocity at all, or only according to the four neighbours rule. Also, turbo regions may be marked with an arrow with a specific length and direction, wherein possible moves are given by a principal point displaced as indicated by the arrow. These rules may apply to all moves either beginning in, or ending in, or beginning and ending in, or passing through, the marked region.

=== Collisions and crashes ===
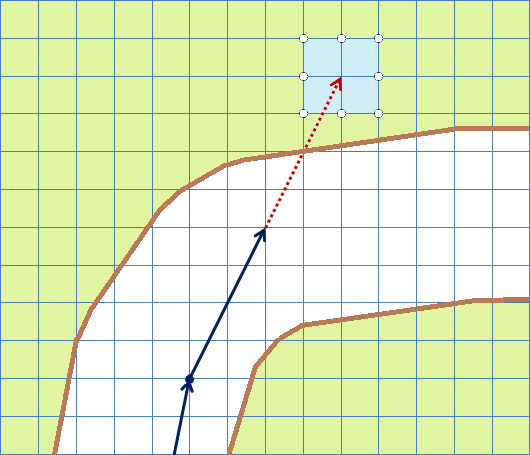
A crash. The player here is unable to avoid leaving the track on their next turn, whichever of the nine squares they choose to move to.

Usually, cars are required to stay on the track for the entire length of the move, not just the start and end. On heavily convoluted racetracks, allowing the line segment representing a move to cross the boundary twice (with start and end points inside the track), some unreasonable shortcuts may be allowed.

Several cars may be allowed to occupy the same point simultaneously. However, the most common and entertaining rule is that while the line segments are allowed to intersect, a car cannot move to or through a grid point that is occupied by another car, as they would collide.

If a player is unable to move according to these rules, the player has crashed. A crashed car may leave the game, or various systems for penalizing crashes can be devised.

A player running off the track may be allowed to continue, but is required to brake and turn around, and re-enter the track again crossing the boundary at a point behind the point where it left. At high speeds, this will take a considerable number of moves.

Another possibility is to penalize a car with "damage points" for each crash. E.g., if it runs off the track or collides, it receives 1 damage point for each square of the last movement, and comes to an immediate stand-still. A car with 5 damage points, say, cannot run anymore.

=== Finding a winner ===
At the end of the game, one may complete a round. E.g., with three players A, B and C (starting on that order), if B is the first to cross the finish line, C is allowed one more move to complete the A-B-C cycle. The winner is the player whose car is the greatest distance beyond the finish line.

If the collision rule mentioned above is used, there is still a considerable advantage in moving first. This may be partially counterbalanced by having the players choose their individual starting points in reverse order. E.g., first C chooses a start point, then B, then A. Then, A makes the first move, followed by B, then C.

Another possible rule is to let the loser move first in the next game.

== Mathematics and physics ==
Each move may be represented by a vector. E.g., a move four squares to the right and two up may be represented by the vector (4,2).

The eight neighbour rule allows changing each coordinate of the vector by ±1. E.g., if the previous move was (4,2), the next one may be any of the following nine:

(3,3) (4,3) (5,3)
(3,2) (4,2) (5,2)
(3,1) (4,1) (5,1)

If each round represents 1 second and each square represents 1 metre, the vector representing each move is a velocity vector in metres per second. The four neighbour rule allows accelerations up to 1 metre per second squared, and the eight neighbours rule allows accelerations up to √2 metres per second squared. A more realistic maximum acceleration for car racing would be 10 metres per second squared, e.g. corresponding to assuming each round to represent a reaction time of 0.5 seconds, and each square to represent 2.5 metres (using 4 neighbour rule).

The speed built up by acceleration can only be reduced at the same rate. This restriction reflects the inertia or momentum of the car. Note that in physics, speeding, braking, and turning right or left all are forms of acceleration, represented by one vector. For a sports car, having the same maximum acceleration without loss of traction in all directions is not unrealistic; see Circle of forces. Note, however, that the circle of forces strictly applies to an individual tyre rather than an entire vehicle, that a slightly elongated ellipse would be more realistic than a circle, and that the theory of traction involving this circle or ellipse is quite simplified.

== History and contemporary use ==
The origins of the game are unknown, but it certainly existed as early as the 1960s. The rules for the game, and a sample track game was published by Martin Gardner in January 1973 in his "Mathematical Games" column in Scientific American; and it was again described in Car and Driver magazine, in August 1973, page 65. Today, the game is used by math and physics teachers around the world when teaching vectors and kinematics. However, the game has a certain charm of its own, and may be played as a pure recreation.

Martin Gardner noted that the game was "virtually unknown" in the United States, and called it "a truly remarkable simulation of automobile racing". He mentions having learned the game from Jürg Nievergelt, "a computer scientist at the University of Illinois who picked it up on a recent trip to Switzerland". Car and Driver described it as having an "almost supernatural" resemblance to actual racing, commenting that "If you enter a turn too rapidly, you will spin. If you "brake" too early, it will take you longer to accelerate out of the turn."

Triplanetary was a science fiction rocket ship racing game that was sold commercially between 1973 and 1981. It used similar rules to Racetrack but on a hexagonal grid and with the spaceships being placed in the center of the grid cells rather than at the vertices. The game used a laminated board which could be written on with a grease pencil.

Simple playable implementation with random race track generation.

== See also ==
- Paper soccer
