= Vem vill bli miljonär? =

- Genre: Quiz show
- Presented by: Bengt Magnusson
- Country of origin: Sweden

Original release
- Network: TV4
- Release: 21 January 2000 – 13 June 2003

Vem vill bli miljonär? (English translation: Who wants to be a millionaire?) is a Swedish game show based on the original British format of Who Wants to Be a Millionaire?. The show was hosted by Bengt Magnusson. The main goal of the game was to win 10 million kronor by answering 15 multiple-choice questions correctly. There were three lifelines - fifty fifty, phone a friend and ask the audience. Vem vill bli miljonär? was broadcast from 21 January 2000 until 13 June 2003. It was shown on the Swedish TV station TV4.

When a contestant got the fifth question correct, he left with at least 10,000 SEK. When a contestant got the tenth question correct, he left with at least 320,000 SEK. Since August 2005 a modified version called Postkodmiljonären has been broadcast, with more focus on the sponsoring lottery.

== Money tree ==
Payout structure
Question number	Question value (in SEK)	
Question number	2000-2001	2001-2003
15	10,000,000	3,000,000
14	5,000,000	1,500,000
13	2,500,000	800,000
12	1,250,000	400,000
11	640,000	200,000
10	320,000	100,000
9	160,000	80,000
8	80,000	60,000
7	40,000	
6	20,000	
5	10,000	
4	5,000	
3	3,000	
2	2,000	
1	1,000	
Milestone Top prize
