= Brio (company) =

Swedish toy company

- Type: Subsidiary
- Industry: Toys
- Founded: Boalt, Scania 1884
- Founder: Ivar Bengtsson
- Headquarters: Malmö, Sweden
- Products: Toys, Child safety seats, Strollers, Furniture
- Parent: Ravensburger
- Website: www.brio.us

Brio (stylized BRIO) is a wooden toy company founded in Sweden. The company was founded in the small town of Boalt, Scania, Götaland in 1884 by basket maker Ivar Bengtsson. For a long time the company was based in Osby, Scania, in southern Sweden. In 1908 Ivar's three sons took the company over and gave it the name "BRIO", which is an acronym for: BRöderna ('the brothers') Ivarsson (in) Osby. In 2006 BRIO moved its headquarters to Malmö, Scania. It is best known for its wooden toy trains, sold in Europe since 1958.

== Lekoseum ==
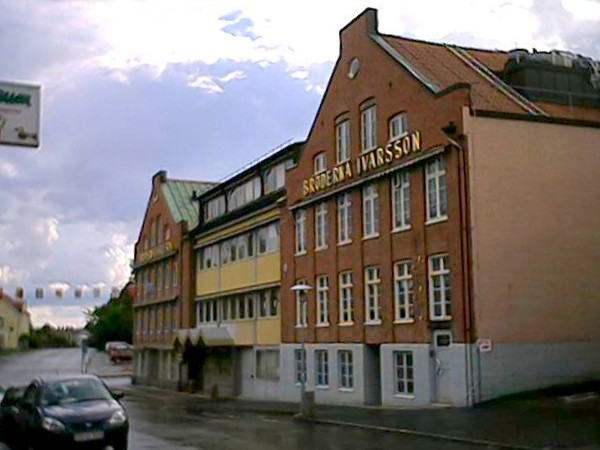
The BRIO building in central Osby

In 1984, the company started the BRIO Lekoseum (from Swedish "leka", to play), a toy museum featuring the company's products and those of other companies (such as Barbie dolls and Märklin model railways), at the headquarters in Osby. Children can play with many of the toys. Since the late summer of 2014 the museum has been run as an independent foundation, hence the official name is now only Lekoseum.

== Products ==
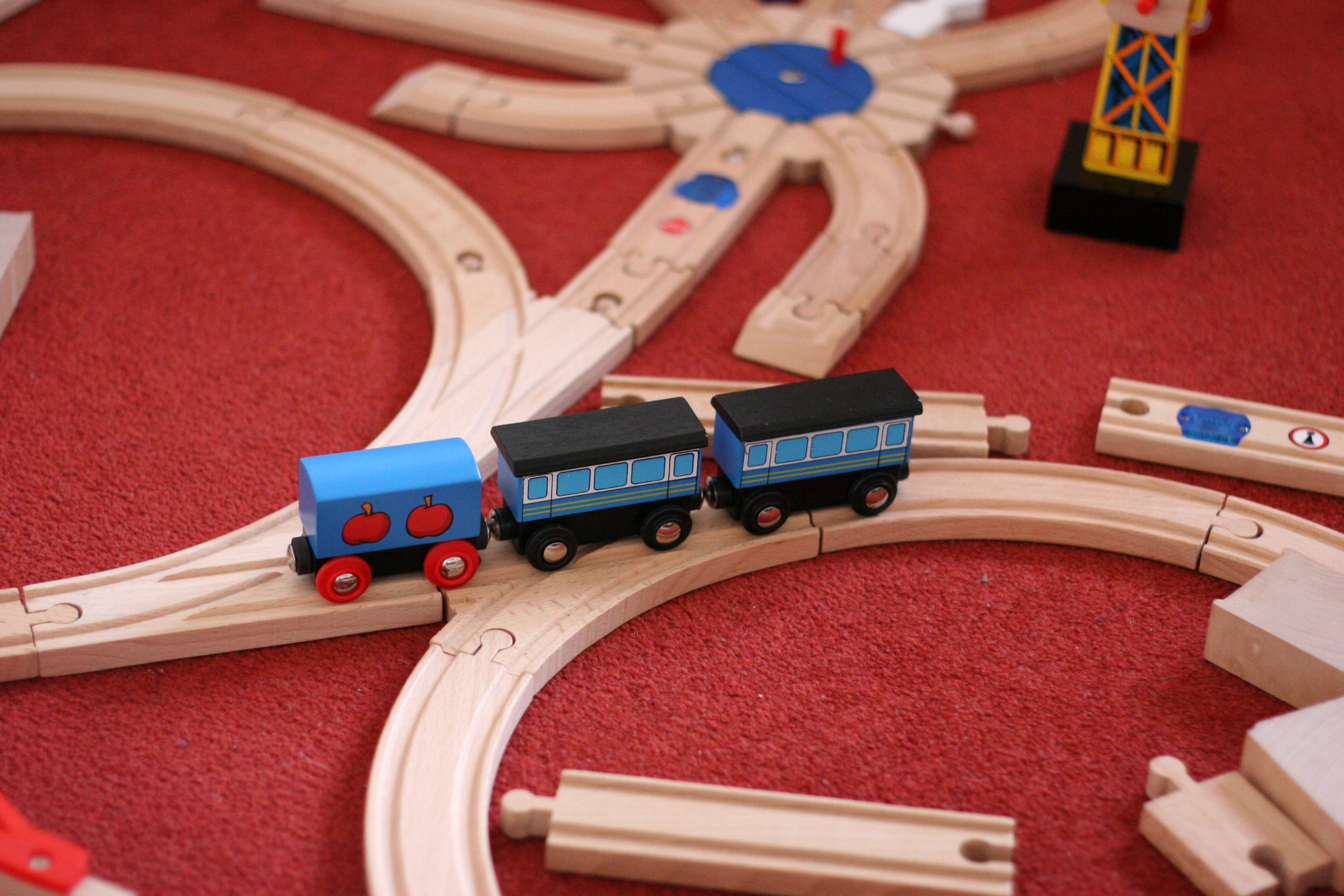
BRIO wooden trains on tracks

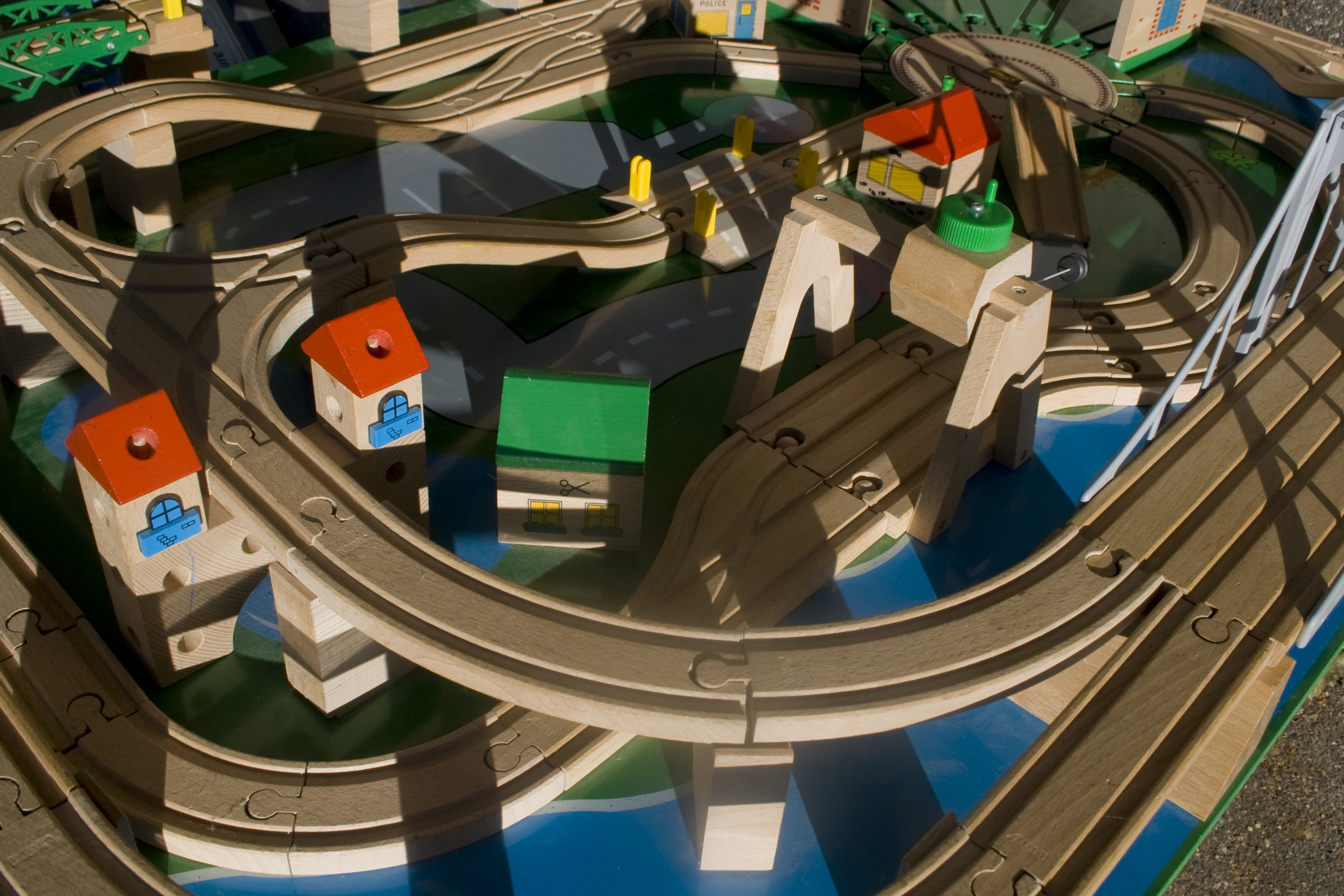
BRIO train tracks

BRIO is best known for its wooden toy trains, sold in Europe since 1958. Most are non-motorized and suitable for younger children. The cars connect with magnets and are easy to manipulate; in recent years, the range has been extended with battery powered, remote control, and 'intelligent track'-driven engines. From 1996 to 2001, BRIO licensed Thomas & Friends wooden trains in some parts of Europe, while Learning Curve held the license in the United States. Many competitors, such as Whittle Shortline, make products that are compatible with BRIO.

BRIO also sells BRIO-Mec construction kits. Long, thin wooden slats with evenly spaced holes are connected together with various fasteners made of colorful plastic. Young children can build sturdy and elaborate constructions.

BRIO also sold Theodore Tugboat toys. Released were the tugboats, the Dispatcher, Benjamin Bridge, Chester the Container Ship, and Barrington and Bonavista barges. These toys were discontinued in 2000, a year before the show was cancelled.

During the 1960s BRIO manufactured dollhouses and dollhouse furniture. Some of this furniture is highly sought after by collectors as it comprises miniature replicas of items by Danish designer Arne Jacobsen. Pieces include the 'egg' chair, the 'series 7' chair, and the 'swan' couch.

Additionally, the Alga subsidiary was one of five companies who at one time produced the physical skill game Crossbows and Catapults.

== Recent company history ==
In 1983, BRIO acquired the Swedish game manufacturer Alga, originally founded as a subsidiary of Pressbyrån in 1917.

Plantoys of Thailand had a joint venture with BRIO in 2001-2002, being present in the Brio catalogs of the time. In 2004, the Swedish investment company Proventus became the major shareholder of Brio with more than 40% of the votes. In the same year BRIO of Sweden moved most of its production to three factories in Guangdong Province, China.

The "Financial Statement January–December 2008" presented on 17 February 2009 speaks of financial problems concerning the company's liquidity. On the 11 March 2009 the company stated "BRIO financially reconstructed—shareholders' equity strengthened by more than SEK 300 million".

BRIO was acquired by the Ravensburger Group on January 8, 2015.
