= Thomas the Tank Engine Game =

Board game published in 1986

Thomas the Tank Engine Game is a board game published in 1986 by Waddingtons.

== Contents ==
Thomas the Tank Engine Game is a game in which four engines start at the sheds and must get to the station around the various lines.

== Reception ==
Charles Vasey reviewed Thomas the Tank Engine Game for Games International magazine, and gave it 4 stars out of 5, and stated that "Among its intended market the game is a great success but is too simple other than for tinkering with by older gamers. Although, having said that, I have noticed it is a popular game for visitors to take down and play about with. Four stars and no mistaking."
