= Ratrace (game) =

Board game

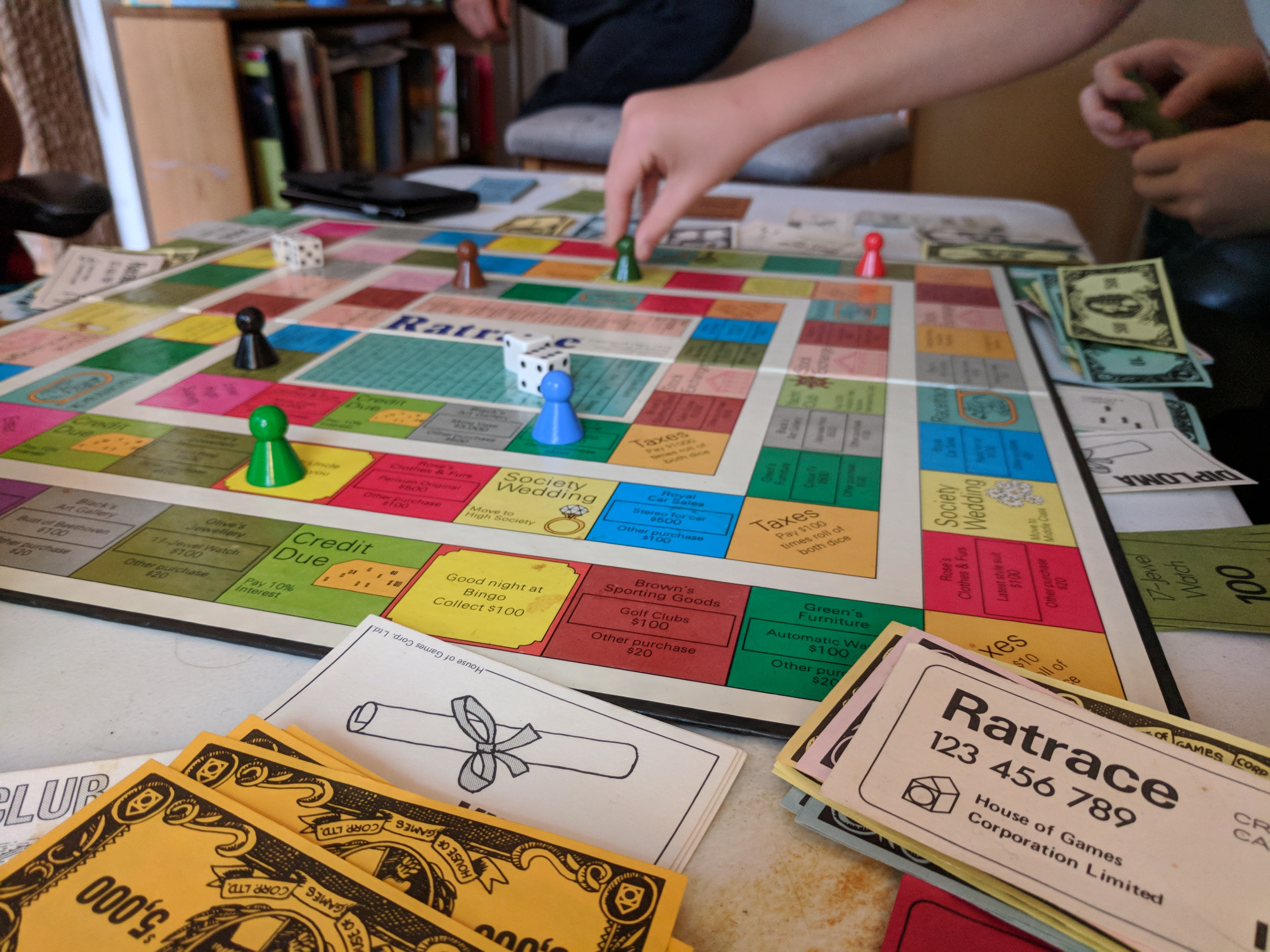
- Designers: Alfons Rubbens
- Publishers: Waddingtons
- Publication: 1967; 58 years ago
- Genres: Board game; Economic game
- Players: 2-6
- Playing time: 90 minutes
- Age range: 9+

Ratrace is a family economic board game designed by Alfons Rubbens and published by Waddingtons in 1967. Described as "the madcap game of social climbing," players attempt to acquire status and cash in order to make their way from Working Class to High Society and become the wealthiest player by the end of the game.

== Gameplay ==
Ratrace is played on a board with three square circuits—the outermost circuit represents Working Class life, the centre circuit represents Middle Class life, and the innermost circuit High Society life. Each player begins the game with $200 in cash and a credit card. To start, each player also chooses one of six small businesses and takes both the nine Status Symbols and the coloured playing token associated with that business. One player acts as the Treasurer and looks after all financial matters concerning the Treasury, such as paying out the wages and collecting taxes, tuitions, and club fees.

All pieces begin on the "Graduation" space in the working class circuit. The game continues with players rolling dice, moving their token that many spaces clockwise around the board, and following the instructions of the space they land on. If a player lands on a Business space, they can choose to either buy the high-priced Status Symbol pictured from the owner of the business to receive a Status Symbol card or they can make the lower-priced “Other Purchase” for which they don't receive a card. Payments can be done using either cash or credit, with credit payments resulting in debts that need to be paid when that player lands on a "Credit Due" space. Money is collected from the sale of Status Symbols from a player's business or from Payday spaces.

Players can only own three Status Symbols at any time, which can be any combination of Working, Middle, or Upper Class. A player can enter Middle Class after acquiring either $500 in cash, three Status Symbols of Working Class or higher from other businesses, or a Night School diploma or Country Club membership, or from landing on the "Society Wedding" space. A player can enter High Society after acquiring either $3000 in cash, three Middle or Upper Class Status Symbols, or a University diploma or Yacht Club membership. In the process of moving between classes, a player must auction off all their Status Symbols of lower or equal class.

There are two types of squares where, if landed on, allow players to gain money through gambling: the Stock Market and the Racetrack. If a player lands on the Stock Market square they can choose to invest any amount of money into stock. The player to the investor's left rolls two dice, with the result determining the loss or gain of the stock by using the Stock Exchange chart in the centre of the board. The investor can then choose to either cash in the investment at the value of the last dice roll, or keep it in and allow the dice to continue to be rolled and passed to the left until the investor cashes in or the dice reach the investor. If a player lands on a Racetrack square, they can choose to bet on a horse numbered from 2 to 12. All players in the game can choose to bet money, but it all must be bet on the same horse. They then roll two dice, with all players receiving cash per dollar bet determined by the Toard Board in the centre of the game if their horse's number is rolled. The player has three chances to do so, with all bets going to the Treasurer if the horse's number is not rolled; if the number is thrown on the first roll, winnings are earned from the WIN column, and from the PLACED or SHOWN columns if achieved on the second or third rolls, respectively.

A player is considered bankrupt when they do not have enough cash or assets to meet a debt. A bankrupt player returns all Status Symbols to the business they bought them from, and starts back at the Graduation space. The winner of the game is the first player to acquire $100,000 cash and three High Society Status Symbols with no credit debt.

== Reception ==
Jeux & Stratégie magazine praised Ratrace for its accessibility to new players, comparing the game to Monopoly. Jon Freeman, in his book The Playboy Winner's Guide to Board Games, described the game positively, stating that Ratrace "has many of the virtues of Careers: It's a friendly game, it doesn't take too long..., and no one is eliminated.

In a review for Issue 37 of Games & Puzzles, Steve Jackson concluded, "There is little player interaction, and the graphics are unimaginative. However, the game is undeniably fun to play." A fictionalization of a game of Ratrace entitled "Confessions of a Ratracer" and written by Rankin Justis was also published in Issue 39 of Games & Puzzles.
