= Air Charter (disambiguation) =

Air charter is the business of renting an aircraft.

Air Charter may also refer to:

- Air Charter (game), a board game
- Air Charter International, a defunct French airline
- Air Charter Limited, a defunct British airline

== See also ==
- Charter Air (disambiguation)
