= Equate =

Equate or equating may refer to:

- Equate, a brand name of Walmart
- Equate (game), board game manufactured by Conceptual Math Media
- Equate, a production joint venture in Kuwait between that country's government and Dow Chemical Company
- Equating, statistical process of determining comparable scores on different forms of an exam
