= Anthony Pratt (disambiguation) =

Anthony Pratt (born 1960) is an Australian billionaire businessman.

Anthony Pratt may also refer to:

- Anthony D. G. Pratt (born 1937), British art director
- Anthony E. Pratt (1903–1994), English musician and inventor of the board game Cluedo/Clue
