= Totopoly =

Horse race themed board game

The Great Race Game
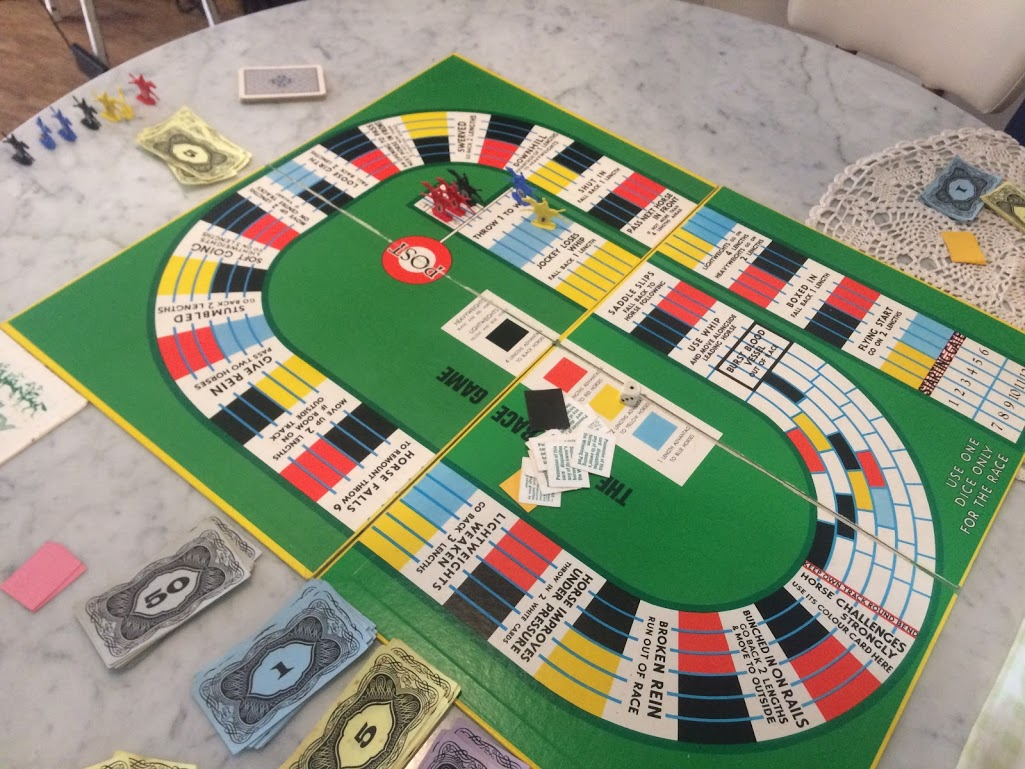
- Totopoly Board - Race Phase
- Designers: Walter Lee, Roy Palmer
- Publishers: Hasbro; Parker Brothers; Waddingtons
- Publication: 1938; 88 years ago
- Players: 3–6
- Setup time: 5–10 minutes
- Playing time: 90 minutes [average]
- Chance: High (dice rolling, card drawing)
- Skills: Negotiation; Resource management; Strategy

Totopoly is a commercial board game, based on the events leading up to, and during, a horse race. Originally published in 1938 by Waddingtons, the game is based on a double-sided board, with each side representing a different half of the game.

== Board design ==
=== Side 1 ===
In the first section, each player has a set of horses, which start and end this phase in one of two stables. The horses are moved around a loop, and, depending on which squares they land on, the player may collect "advantage" and "disadvantage" cards, which become important in the game's second phase. Some horses may be eliminated during this part of the game. An unusual feature is that each player throws the dice only once in each turn, the same throw being used for all his or her horses.

=== Side 2 ===
The game's second phase is the actual race. Before starting, bets may be placed on any horse the player wishes. During the race, "advantage" cards may be played to improve a horse's position; also, any "disadvantage" cards held must be used, with the effect of holding a horse back or cancelling an "advantage" card, before the end of the race. As well as the settling of bets, prize money is awarded for first, second and third place.

== Horse names ==
The horses use the names of the winners of the Lincolnshire Handicap between the years 1926–37. The race, which was first run at Lincoln Racecourse in 1853, is now (with occasional exceptions) run at Doncaster Racecourse.

== Criticism ==
A curious aspect of the game, which some people have regarded as a serious design flaw, is that (in the original version) the winner was the person whose horse came in first, irrespective of how much money they had. This meant that the effect of money accrued in the first phase of this version of the game was fairly minor, and in particular the elaborate rules for betting, together with the final race prize money, were irrelevant.

More recent editions of the game have an alteration to the rules, allowing the players to make the winner the one who has most money at the end of the race.
