= Equals (game) =

Board game

The game Equals was a board game similar to Scrabble, but instead of tiles with letters combined to form words, it used tiles with numbers and basic arithmetic operations to form equations.

The game was sold originally as Zahlenjux by Pelikan in Germany, and in Canada was licensed by Waddingtons.

== Objective ==
Players draw tiles and lay down equations, starting in the center, and continue until no player can lay another tile, the same as in Scrabble. However, there are situations that do not occur in Scrabble, for example while you can extend equations, e.g. by putting 1x4 in front of 4x5=20 to form 1x4 = 4x5 = 20, you can not put 4x5 in front of 4x5=20 to form 4x5 = 4x5 = 20. The immediate right hand side of each part of the sequence must be correct by itself.

A typical first play follows as:

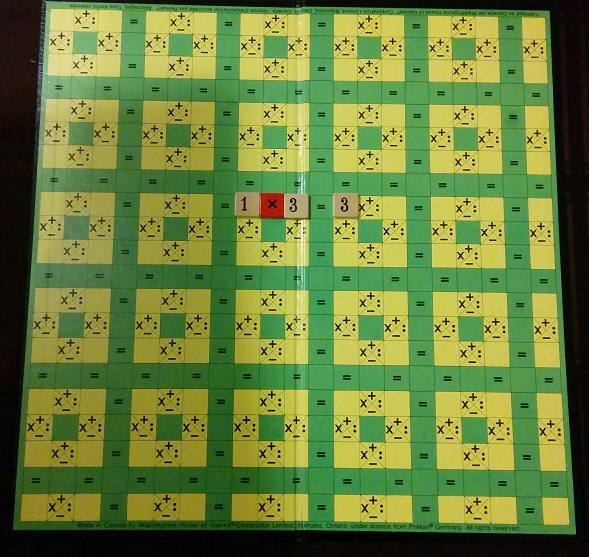

Note the use of the colon tile to represent the division operator, as opposed to the slash or obelus.

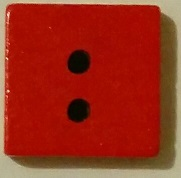

== Additional images ==
The cover of the Canadian rules booklet

The tagline as featured on the box

== See also ==
- Equate (game)
