= Exploration (board game) =

1967 family board game

- Designers: James C. Spiring
- Publishers: Spiring Enterprises; Waddingtons; Otto Maier Verlag
- Players: 2 to 4
- Setup time: 5 minutes
- Playing time: 45 minutes
- Chance: High (dice rolling)
- Age range: 10 and up

Exploration is a family board game of expeditions and exploration published by the British company Spiring Enterprises Inc. in 1967. It was acquired by Waddingtons in 1970 and became very popular.

== Description ==
=== Play ===
Exploration is an adventure-themed board game for 2–4 players (although there are rules for a 5 player game) in which each player is an explorer who must first organize an expedition of exploration and then set out to successfully complete the adventure. The choice of expeditions are: mountaineering, deep-sea diving, a sailing voyage of discovery, and archaeology. The game consists of two phases:

1. Preparation: Gain personnel and equipment through moving by the roll of a regular die around an outer track collecting cards, and balancing necessary expenditure with opportunities to earn extra revenue for the forthcoming adventure.
2. Exploration: Traverse either land or sea, being rewarded for seeking objectives and treasures contained within a grid of spaces in the interior of the board. A special 'diradice' is used, limiting movement choices, which may be further restricted by symbols allowing spaces to be passed through only if the right equipment card is held. To complete their expedition, players must at least visit their main objective, though they may wish to visit any or all others specified on their personnel or club cards. Some minor objectives are open to more than one expedition, and players may need to be the first to visit in order to claim the cash reward.

There are several variations, including a shorter game in which only the second phase of the game (the exploration) is played.

=== Victory conditions ===
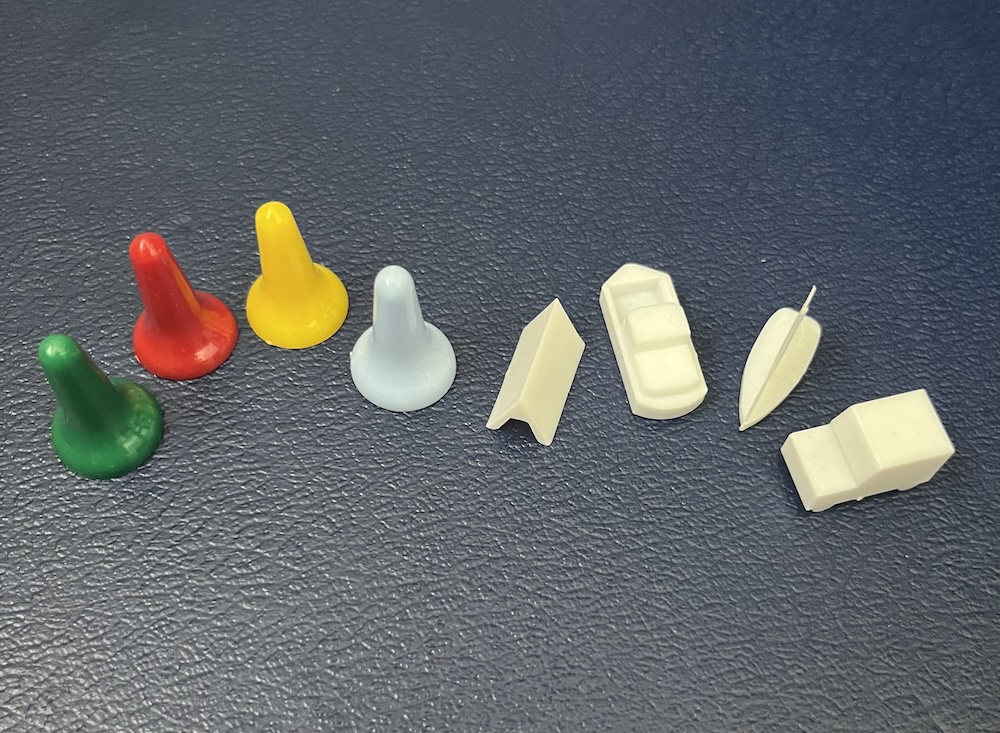
Exploration (game) Playing Pieces

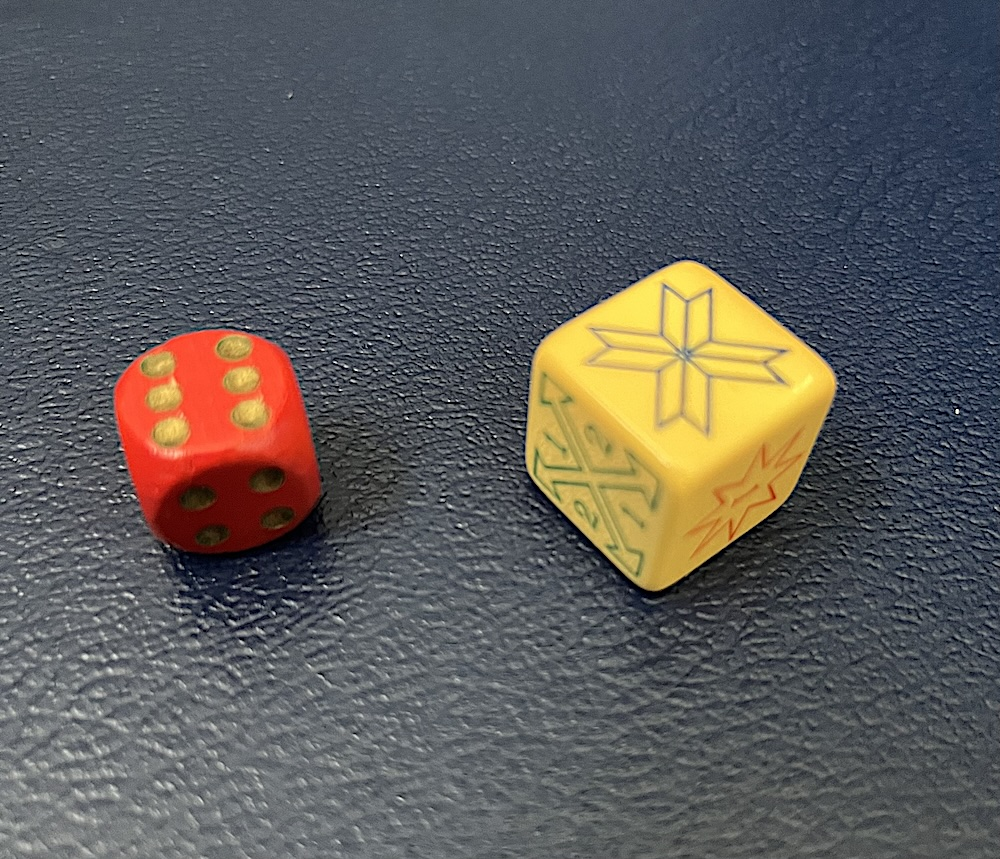
Exploration (game) Dice

Once a player has decided their exploration is complete, they must return to the base space. There is a ‘race to finish’ as the first player to do so is rewarded with £1000 and the 'Prize Fund' (comprising the costs from purchases and any fines collected from club cards). Second and third-place finishing players gain £500 and £200 respectively. When the second-last player finishes, the game is over, and the player with the most money is the winner.

== Publication history ==
James Spiring, a British inventor and game designer, designed Exploration and used his company Spiring Enterprises to market the game in 1967. More interested in using his company to sell his other inventions, Spiring sold the rights to the game to Waddingtons in 1970. It became a very popular family board game in the UK during the 1970s. A German language edition was published by Otto Maier Verlag in 1971.

== Reception ==
In Issue 25 of the British Magazine Games & Puzzles, David Parlett noted, "Exploration is billed as 'an excitiong adventure game' in which you 'recapture the thrills of man's great achievements'. I don't think it lives up to that claim, but perhaps I do not have a vivid enough imagination." Parlett didn't think the game was original enough, saying, "Anyone who plays a lot of games is unlikely to go overboard for it." Parlett concluded by giving the game an overall rating of 2 out of 6, calling it "an unnecessarily strung-out amalgam of well-worn features whose total is somehow less than the sum of their parts."

Philippa Warr, writing a retrospective review for Shut Up & Sit Down, commented, "It's a very particular art style – very much an embodiment of the idea of manly men going exploring or a Boy's Own adventure. There's a lot that's problematic in the world view it invokes – it's very much a Western perspective and involves going to these far away places and just ... taking things you find there or jamming a flag in it. It's also a very male perspective. This game is not about ladies heading off into the wilds. It's the sort of thing you'd say was 'of its time' to allow for the context in which it was created but it's reasonable to cringe at what that time produced."

== Other recognition ==
A copy of Exploration is held in the collection of The Museum of Games and Gaming (Preston, UK).
