= Anthony E. Pratt =

English inventor

Anthony Ernest Pratt (10 August 1903 – 9 April 1994) was the inventor of the English detective-themed board game Cluedo, currently owned and marketed by American entertainment company Hasbro.

In the lead-up to the 150 millionth sale of Cluedo in 1996, Waddingtons began a hunt to find out about the elusive creator of the board game. It was eventually revealed that Pratt had died two years earlier of natural causes.

== Early life and education ==
Pratt was born at 13 Brighton Road in the Balsall Heath area of Birmingham, England. He received his secondary education at St. Philip's School in Edgbaston. His favourite subject was chemistry, but he suffered from poor eyesight, which affected his education. Pratt was a gifted musician and a proficient pianist from an early age. When he left school at 15, he wanted to pursue a career in chemistry and was apprenticed to a local chemical manufacturer. But with no formal qualifications in chemistry and a growing interest in music, he went on to pursue a musical career.

== Career ==
During the interwar years, Pratt became a musician and earned a living playing piano recitals in country hotels and on cruise ships, where he travelled to places like New York and Iceland. Also an aspiring composer (he was a huge fan of Edward Elgar), he was at one time accompanist to the renowned soprano Kirsten Flagstad.

During the Second World War, Pratt worked in an engineering factory in Birmingham that manufactured components for tanks. He found his work on a drilling machine tedious, but it gave him time to think about things, including the design of Cluedo.

== Cluedo – or Murder at Tudor Close ==
It was during the Second World War that Pratt had the idea for a murder mystery board game. The idea for Cluedo came from his days spent playing musical concerts in country hotels where part of the evening's entertainment would have been murder mystery games. These would involve both actors and hotel guests playing the characters in a plot which involved the murder of one or more of the guests. The setting was a country house with its many sprawling rooms, with guests gathered for an evening's dining and socialising, but a body was found murdered and all the guests fell under suspicion. By putting clues together, the hotel guests must solve the mystery. These were very popular games at the time, and given this along with Pratt's love of detective fiction including that of his favourites Raymond Chandler and Agatha Christie, the spark for Cluedo was created. At the time books like And Then There Were None and The Body in the Library were also enormously popular. Hence, from 1943 to 1945, Anthony and his wife Elva (1913–1990) designed a murder mystery board game in their home at 9 Stanley Road, Kings Heath. The original game was called Murder!, with the artwork for the board itself designed by Elva.

Pratt filed his original patent application on 1 December 1944. He had spoken to a close friend, Geoffrey Bull (who had invented the board game Buccaneer), and it was Bull who introduced him to Norman Watson, managing director of games manufacturer Waddingtons. In February 1945, Pratt demonstrated the game to Watson, who immediately saw the winning formula of the game and, after a few minor modifications, decided to go ahead and manufacture it. It was Waddingtons who renamed the game Cluedo (a combination of "Clue" and "Ludo", a Latin word meaning "I play", and the name of a popular board game in the UK). But material shortages in post-war Britain meant the game did not go into production until 1949.

Pratt was granted patent GB586817 'Improvements in Board Games' on 1 April 1947.

He sold the international rights for £5,000 (equivalent to £121,280 in 2025) in 1953, but continued to receive UK royalties until the patent expired in 1967.

In November 2025, Pratt's daughter donated his correspondence and memorabilia relating to the game, including an original version, to Birmingham Archives at the Library of Birmingham and to Birmingham Museum and Art Gallery.

== Later years ==
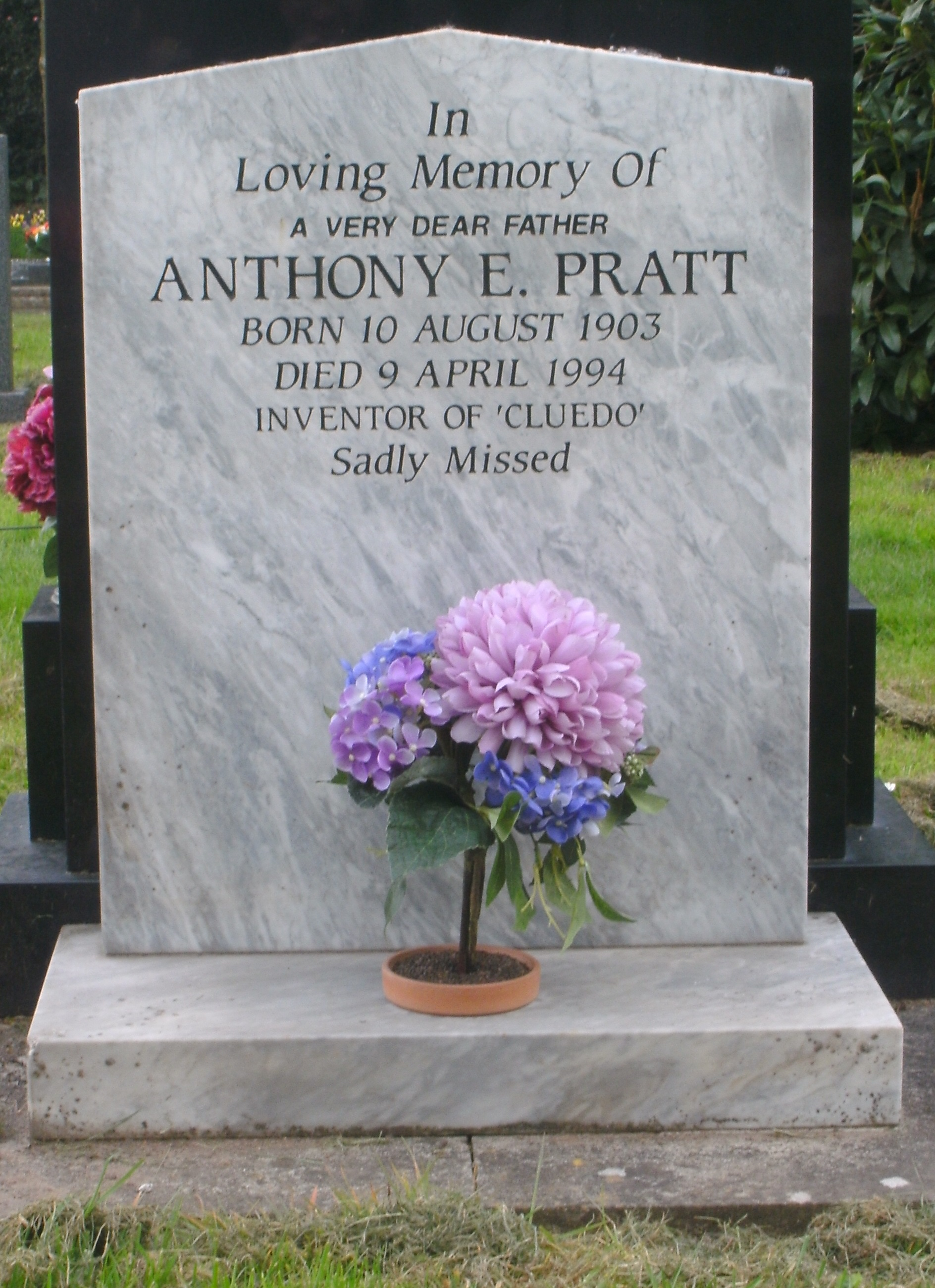
Anthony Pratt's grave at Bromsgrove cemetery, Worcestershire

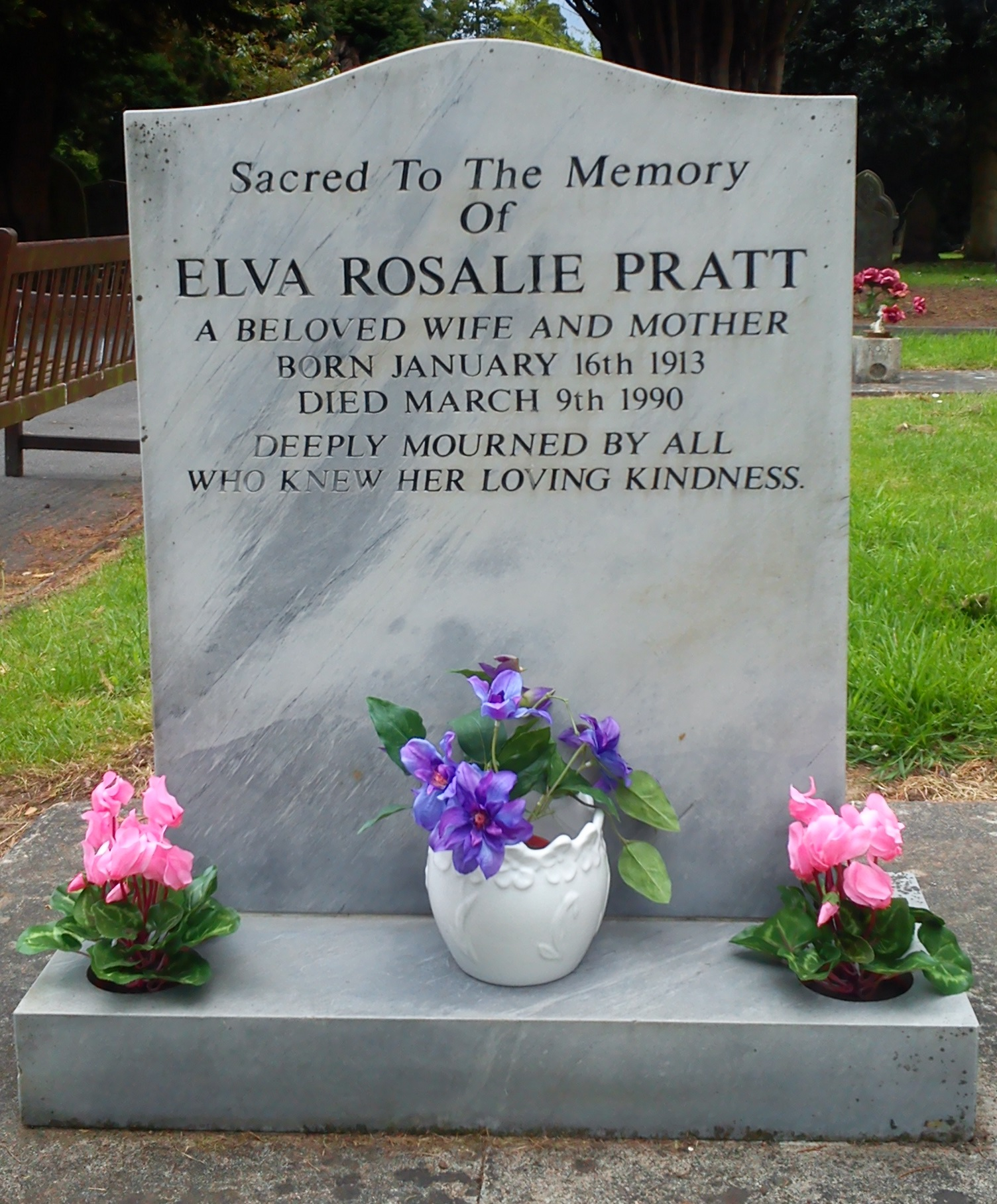
Elva Pratt's grave at Bromsgrove cemetery, Worcestershire

After the end of the Second World War, Pratt entered the British Civil Service working for the Ministry of Labour to help demobbed servicemen and women to return to peacetime work.

In 1953, four years after Cluedo first went on sale, Waddingtons told Pratt that the game was not selling very well, particularly in America, and offered him a cheque for £5,000 for the overseas rights to Cluedo. This was a considerable sum and, with their daughter Marcia Lewis newly born, he accepted the money. Such a large sum of money meant it was no longer vital for him to work, and the money enabled him and his wife to buy a sweets and tobacco shop in Warwickshire where they settled for a while. However Elva was frequently ill and disliked her time there, and this prompted a move to Bournemouth, where they lived for over twenty years, initially letting holiday flats. It was early in this time that Pratt worked as a solicitor's clerk, an occupation he held for about three years before retiring around 1962 (aged 59).

Eventually the Cluedo patent lapsed, and in 1980 Anthony and Elva moved back to Birmingham, where they both enjoyed their retirement years. He continued to play and enjoy music and indulged his love of books, including detective fiction.

Pratt developed Alzheimer's disease towards the end of his life and moved into a nursing home, where he died at the age of 90. He is buried in Bromsgrove Cemetery.

In 2013, Pratt was honored with a blue plaque crediting him as the creator of Cluedo. Pratt's blue plaque is currently installed at 9 Stanley Road, Kings Heath.

== Books ==
- Parlett, David, The Oxford History of Board Games: Oxford University Press, 1999, ISBN 0-19-212998-8
- Jaffe, Deborah, The History of Toys From Spinning Tops to Robots: The History Press Ltd, 2006, ISBN 0-7509-3849-8
- McDowell, Michael, Clue: A Novel: Fawcett, 1985, ISBN 0-449-13049-5
- Cameron, Vicki, Cluedo Mysteries: Running Press, 2003, ISBN 0-7624-1404-9
- Treat, Lawrence and Hardie, George, "Cludeo" Armchair Detective: Dorling Kindersley Publishers Ltd, 1983, ISBN 0-86318-017-5

== See also ==
- The Body in the Library
- Whodunit
