= Charter Air =

Charter Air may refer to

- a former name of the airline Fischer Air
- Charter Air Transport, a defunct airline based on Ohio

== See also ==
- Air charter, for the general business or chartering aircraft
- Air Charter (disambiguation)
