= Bewitched (board game) =

Board game published in 1988

Bewitched is a board game published in 1988 by Waddingtons.

== Gameplay ==
Bewitched is a game in which a witch has cast a spell that turned all the princes in the land into frogs. Players try to find the spell book that will allow them to be the first to turn their frog into a prince.

== Reception ==
Brian Walker reviewed Bewitched for Games International magazine, and gave it 4 stars out of 5, and stated that "Bewtiched is both a fine game and a welcome alternative to the plethora of violent toys which seem to appear every Christmas."
