= Travel Go =

Board game

Go — The International Travel Game, later Travel Go, is a family board game, based on international travel, which was manufactured by Waddingtons Ltd from 1961 onwards. The objective of the game is to travel the world by air, sea, rail and road, collect a predetermined number of souvenirs from each city visited, and to return to the starting point (London). The board is in two parts, and each player has a counter on each part. The outer edge is where the player moves when in a city, and is where money can be changed and tickets purchased. The inner part is a world map marked with travel routes between major cities. The map also shows remote locations (such as Heard Island) to which a player might be diverted by a "storm" following the drawing of a "risk" card by landing on a hazard marker while travelling.
