= 4000 A.D. =

Science Fiction Game

Cover of bilingual Canadian edition, 1972

4000 A.D. is a science fiction conquest board game published by Waddingtons in 1972.

== Description ==
4000 A.D. is a game of conquest and expansion for 2–4 players that uses no dice or random elements. Players conquer star systems, then use the star's resources to build more ships.

=== Components ===
- 27" x 22" mounted square-grid game board map in 2 folded sections
- Several dozen plastic spaceships
- 8 warp markers
- rulebook (In the Canadian edition two rulebooks, one English and one French)
- strategy book

== Gameplay ==
=== Movement ===
Moving ships from star to star uses a hidden "space warp" system — other players can see the point and time of departure, and distance, but not the destination. A ship may leave warp at anytime to arrive at a star system.

=== Combat ===
Combat is a simple "majority rules" system: a larger number of ships completely eliminates a smaller force.

=== Resources ===
Owning two star systems with opposite resources allows the player to build new starships.

=== Victory conditions ===
The last player to survive is the winner.

== Publication history ==
Earl Doherty designed 4000 A.D., which was then published by Waddingtons in the UK in 1972. Waddingtons also published a bilingual (English/French) version for sale in Canada, and a German-language edition. Parker Brothers also produced a licensed German-language edition titled Anno 4000. The Encyclopedia of Science Fiction also stated that the game was similar with Starforce: Alpha Centauri.

== Reception ==
In Issue 4 of The Space Gamer, Neil Shapiro commented that "Someone, somewhere, went to a powerful lot of artistic trouble to design and produce 4000 A.D.'s physical parts. I only wish they had paid half as much attention to the game's more ephemeral guts--the rationale behind it, the science, and the rules of play." Games was additionally complimentary, and included 4000 A.D. in its top 100 games of 1986, calling it a "suspenseful, rapidly changing game of interstellar expansion and battle."

In the 1980 book The Complete Book of Wargames, Jon Freeman called this "a tense contest for those who like their games devoid of chance — but not of surprises." Freeman also noted that it was "one of those rare games that are almost equally attractive for two, three, or four players." He thought that "the Alliance rules have a few holes". Despite this, he concluded by giving an Overall Presentation grade of "Very Good", saying, "4000 A.D. is not only fun but proof positive that a game doesn't have to be wildly complicated to be a real challenge." An entry of The Encyclopedia of Science Fiction also praised the game's strategy and theme, concluding that "4000 A.D. is a striking example of rich abstract gameplay generated from a simple set of rules."

== Reviews ==
- Games #10
- Games and Puzzles
- 1980 Games 100 in Games
- 1981 Games 100 in Games
- 1982 Games 100 in Games
- Jeux & Stratégie #6
- The Playboy Winner's Guide to Board Games
