= Escape from Atlantis =

Board game

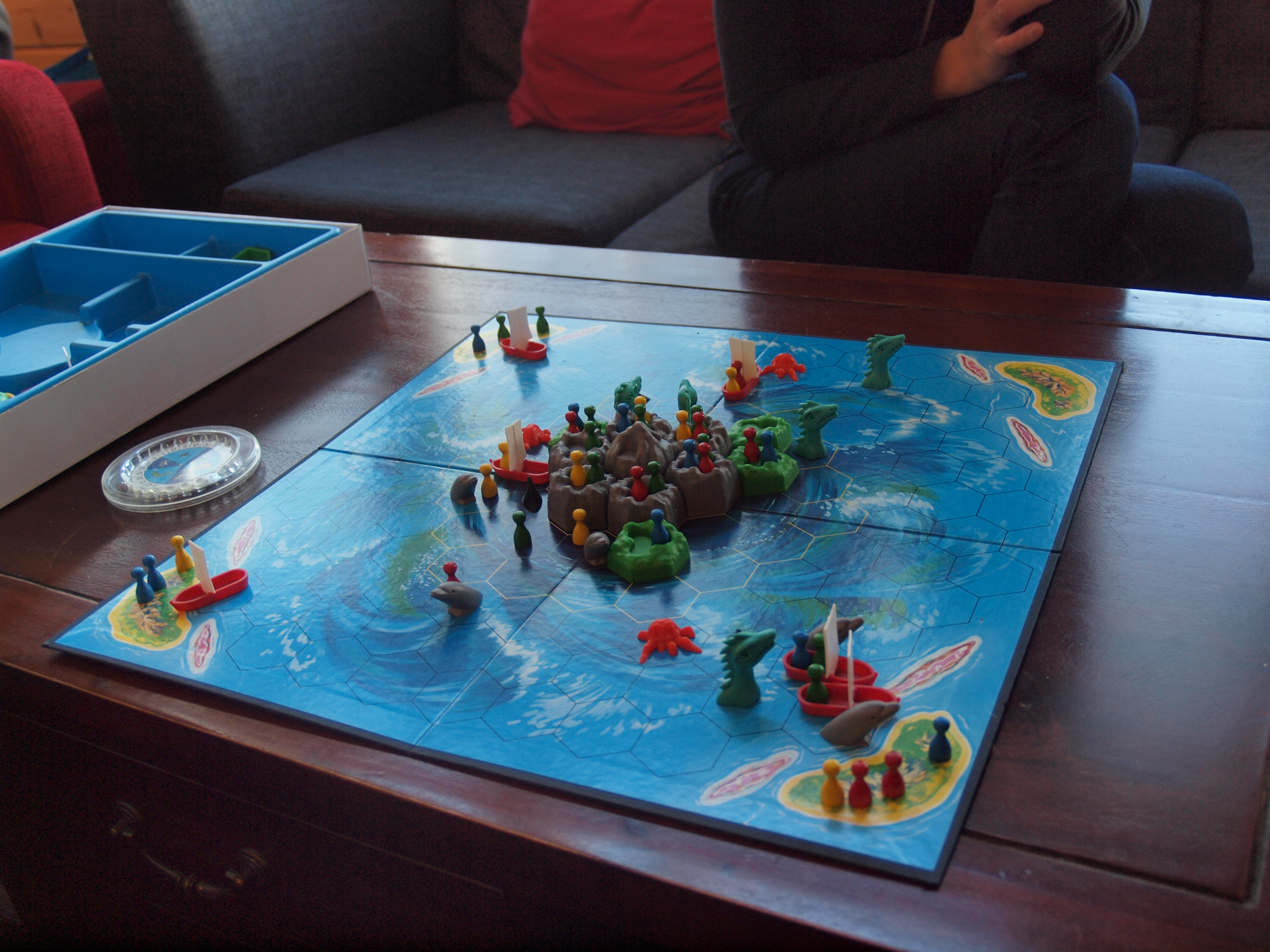
- Escape from Atlantis in the middle of play
- Designers: Julian Courtland-Smith
- Publishers: Parker Brothers
- Players: 2–4
- Chance: Medium

Escape from Atlantis is a board game that portrays the sinking of Atlantis and the attempts by the population to escape the sinking island. It was originally released in the United States under the title of Survive! and first published in the English language by Parker Brothers in 1982. The game was invented by Julian Courtland-Smith. Early copies of Escape from Atlantis include the name of the then-co-copyright owner, C. Courtland-Smith.

In 1986, Waddingtons launched their three-dimensional version Escape from Atlantis in the UK with revised rules. Waddingtons also sold a bilingual (English/French) version of Escape from Atlantis in Canada. The game was sublicensed in 1987 and sold worldwide in a number of different languages. A 1996 Hasbro version of the game was released in Europe under the Waddington's brand. This version of the game revised the rules from the original version. World sales of Escape from Atlantis exceed 1.25 million units.

American publisher Stronghold Games reprinted a new version of the game under the title "Survive: Escape from Atlantis!" in February 2011. In June 2012, Stronghold Games launched another new edition, "Survive: Escape From Atlantis! – 30th Anniversary Edition". It included refreshed artwork and a slightly revised theme (Explorers finding and escaping from Atlantis). Simultaneously, French publisher, Asmodee, licensed the EU languages and launched "The Island", which is the same game as Stronghold's version, but with a rebranded name for EU trademark purposely only. In 2012 "The Island" (Survive: Escape from Atlantis) was a '2012 Juego del Ano Finalist'. In 2013, Stronghold Games launched a '5-6 Player Mini Expansion Kit' plus 'Dolphins & Dive Dice Expansion Kit' and 'The Giant Squid Expansion Kit' for "Survive: Escape from Atlantis! – 30th Anniversary Edition". All three expansion kits can also be played with Asmodee's "The Island".

== Contents ==
=== Board ===
The centre of the game's board, representing the mountainous island of Atlantis itself, is covered with several tiers of molded hexagon tiles (37 in total) giving the game a partly three-dimensional appearance. The island is made up of four different "rings", with a mountain peak at the centre, a ring of mountains around it, a ring of forest around that, and finally a ring of sandy beach at the outer edge. Each of the tiles has space to hold a maximum of 3 Atlanteans.

The island is surrounded by open water, and in each of the four corners of the board are four coral islands.

As play progresses the land tiles are incrementally removed, simulating the ongoing sinking of the island. The objective of the game is for players to save their ten Atlanteans from the sinking island by transporting them to the safety of the coral islands.

=== Game pieces ===
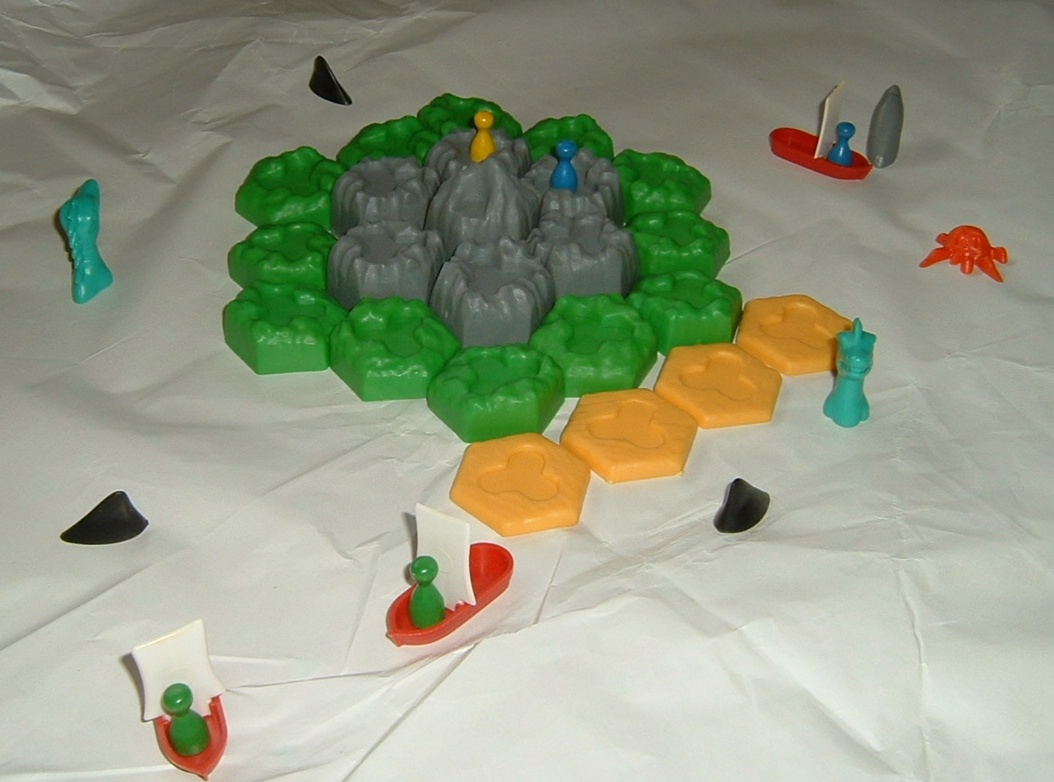
Some of the game pieces

Escape from Atlantis includes four Atlantean tribes, each with twelve villagers. These are represented as small wooden figures, coloured red, blue, green and yellow. Each player picks one tribe. Also included are boats and various sea animals: sharks, giant squid, sea serpents and dolphins. Some versions of Escape from Atlantis use dice. Waddington's version uses a special spinner device.

== Rules ==
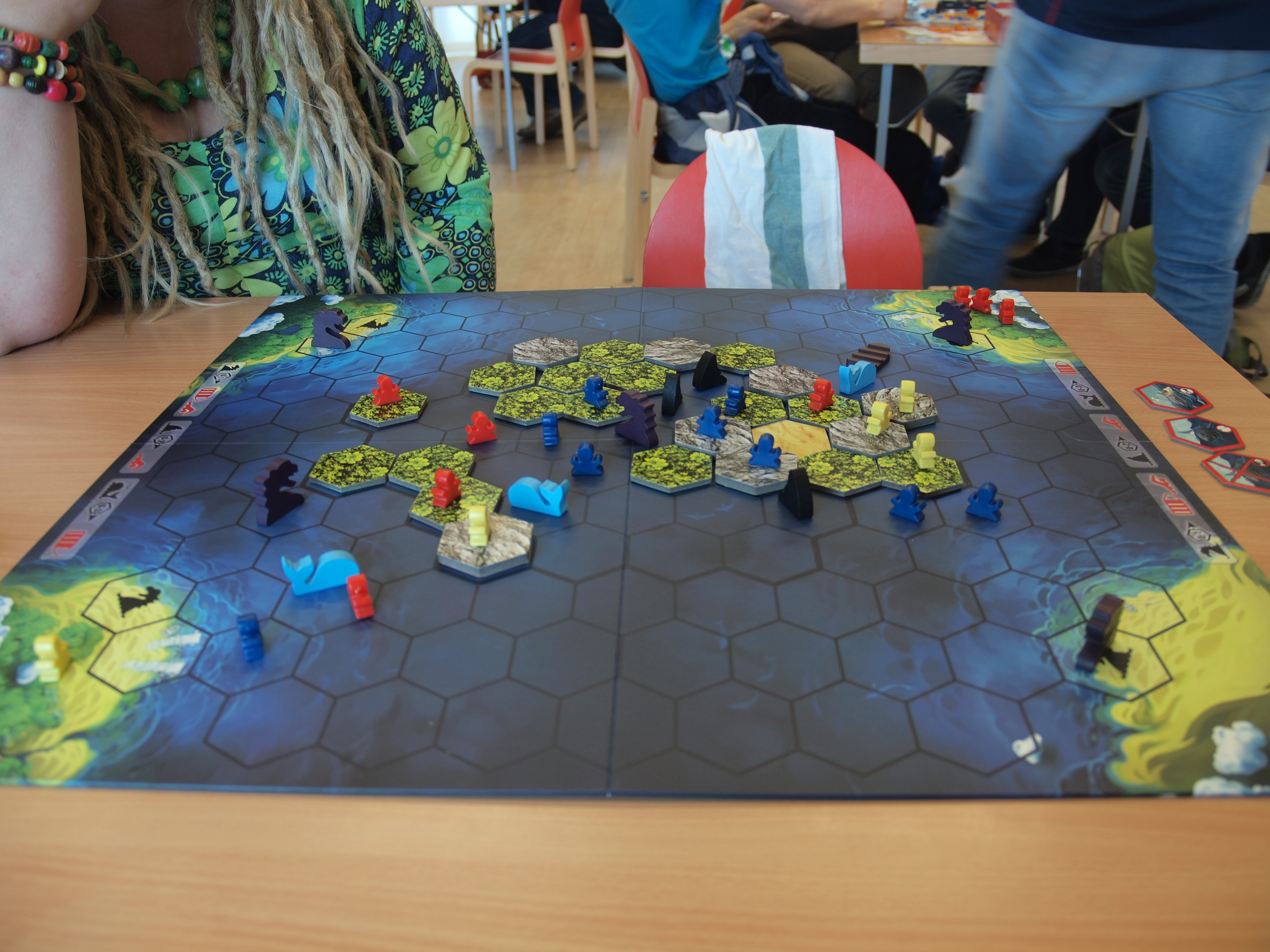
A remake of Escape of Atlantis to commemorate its 30th anniversary

=== Game start ===
At the start of the game, the island tiles are shuffled, and the island of Atlantis is built at the centre of the game board. Each player sets his/her tribe up on the island, in places of his/her own choosing. The only limitation is that sandy beach tiles can start with only one villager per tile. Some of the boats are placed in the sea adjacent to the island of Atlantis. In a two-player game, there are two boats. In a three- or four-player game, there are four.

=== Game rounds ===
On his/her turn, each player does three things, in this order:

- Moves his/her villagers,
- Sinks one tile from the island of Atlantis,
- Spins the spinner (or rolls the die) and moves the sea animals accordingly.

==== Movement phase ====
Movement is by the villagers walking on land, swimming (slowly) in the ocean, or being transported by boat or on the backs of helpful dolphins.

The player has a fixed number of three spaces of movement on each turn. This can be freely distributed among the villagers, for example by moving one villager three spaces, or moving three villagers one space each. When swimming, a villager may only move one space per turn, but there are no such restrictions for other methods of movement.

When travelling by boat, the player can also move a boat with villagers from other tribes on it, provided the player's tribe holds a non-minority position (in other words, no other tribe has more members in the same boat). This creates a tactical element by allowing players to transport other players' villagers.

==== Sinking phase ====
On each turn, an island tile is removed from the island. The removal starts from the sandy beach on the outer edge, and continues further inland as outer rings are exhausted. A tile with villagers on it may only be sunk if no empty tiles are present in the currently sinking ring.

A villager falling into the water does not drown. He floats at the surface, capable of swimming one space per turn, or three when riding on the back of a dolphin. Dolphins can only transport one villager at a time.

The villagers' journeys are endangered variously by sea serpents, giant squid, sharks, and by whirlpools caused by the sinking land itself, and aided by dolphins and boats. A symbol on the bottom of the removed tile tells which of these appears in the tile's place.

Whirlpools destroy all moving objects (but not land) from the same space and adjacent spaces. The whirlpool is then discarded.

==== Spinning phase ====
In the spinning phase, the Atlantean Swirler spinner shows which kind of sea creatures should be moved, and how many blocks: one, two, three or five.

The player then freely selects one of the sea creatures in question from the board and moves it accordingly. He/she can decide its route for him/herself. This allows using sharks, octopus or sea monsters to attack other players, or dolphins to come to the rescue of the player's own tribesmen.

When a sea animal comes to contact with villagers on the sea, what happens depends on the animal:

- Sharks kill villagers swimming in the water. They do not harm boats or their passengers.
- Whales destroy boats. Any passengers in the boat survive, but are dropped in the water.
- Sea Monsters both destroy boats and kill villagers.
- Dolphins allow villagers to ride them, giving them a maximum of three blocks of movement instead of one. They do not protect villagers from sharks or sea monsters.

A diving sea creature can appear at any sea hexagon that does not have villagers or boats in it.

=== Winning the game ===
The game ends when all villagers either have safely arrived on the coral islands, or are dead, or if the volcano tile is flipped over.

The winner is the player who, at the end of game, has succeeded in saving the most of their own villagers.

== Rule variations ==
Survive! the board game – the original version of the game

In the original version, Survive!, the land pieces are randomly placed in the sinking island area at the start of the game. This results in the island sinking in a less-uniform fashion than the current Escape from Atlantis game. This, paired with other changes, provides significantly different gameplay.

The Survive! game board uses a slightly different board design. The most marked difference is that each corner island has two entrance hexes rather than one. Survive! also has a gameplay feature whereby some games end earlier than others. Under one of the rock tiles (i.e., the last tiles to sink), there is a graphic of an explosion which signifies that the volcanic island has erupted, ending the game and killing any villagers who have not yet escaped. Because the end of the game depended on when this tile is revealed, players were not able to rely on having a pre-determined number of turns remaining.

In terms of villagers, each of a player's 10 pieces have a hidden numeric digit from 1 to 6 located on the bottom. This value represents the point value earned for rescuing the given villager. Once placed on the board, players are no longer able to reference which villager token has which number, even if the piece leaves play. As a result, it can become difficult to remember where the most valuable villagers are located, and furthermore, the values of other players pieces are never known. Strategy dictates that the most valuable villagers are often the ones leaving the island first (on boats), so they are typically the most valuable to go after with sea monsters. At the end of a game, the player with the highest surviving point total wins.

Rather than a spinner device, a custom 6-sided die is used to control the sea animals. Also, whales replace the giant squid counters, and there are no dolphins.

== Reviews ==
- Jeux & Stratégie #60
- Family Games: The 100 Best (as "Survive!")
