= Don't miss the boat! =

Board game

- "Don't miss the boat!" box cover
- Publishers: Parker Brothers, Waddingtons
- Years active: Since 1965
- Genres: Board game
- Players: 2-4
- Setup time: 1 minute
- Playing time: 15 minutes
- Chance: None
- Skills: Strategy, tactics, counting

"Don't miss the boat!" is a board game for two to four players, with no dice or cards or element of elimination. The rules are simple enough to be mastered by a five-year-old, yet there is no element of chance, and experienced players can use sophisticated tactics and strategies to win. The game was first published by Parker Brothers in 1965, then by Waddingtons in 1966. The title is currently owned by Hasbro and is no longer manufactured.

== Play ==
The board consists of a raised, cross shaped platform divided into squares on which the pieces move surrounded by a circular "canal". Each player has 8 pieces (or "men") and a boat of the same color which is located at one of "docks" at the ends of the cross. The initial position of all the pieces and boats is always the same. The winner is the first player to successfully move five of their eight pieces into their own boat. Players take turns to move one piece to an adjacent square in any direction (including diagonals). Pieces can move further by jumping over one or more of their own or opponents' pieces, making a series of jumps where possible. When a player jumps into their boat, all the boats are moved clockwise around the board, one quarter turn. As a result, players will often find their own boat moves away from the dock they have moved one of their pieces to, giving the game its name.

== Comparison with other games ==
Although the objective of the game (moving a number of pieces from start to finish) is superficially similar to ludo, there are no dice and there is no element of luck. The movement of the pieces is determined purely by the rules, as in chess or draughts. The pieces are moved similarly to a king in chess, but the ability to extend moves by jumping over other pieces has similarities to draughts, although pieces are not eliminated during this process: it is more similar in this respect to halma or Chinese checkers.

== Tactics and strategy ==
Players can attempt to predict the movement of other players' pieces, and the effect this will have on the position of the boats. Tactics include frustrating the predictions of other players by choosing not to jump into a boat when expected. This can even be done cooperatively with other players in an attempt to prevent another player from winning.
