= Lose Your Shirt =

1976 board game

Lose Your Shirt is a board game published in 1976 by Waddingtons.

== Contents ==
Lose Your Shirt is a game in which players move their horses using cards matching the colours of the horses.

== Reception ==
Brian Walker reviewed the game as First Past the Post for Games International magazine, and gave it 3 stars out of 5, and stated that "A simple, fun game for 2-6 players, to which a certain piquancy could be added by playing for real money. Not that I would recommend such a course, unless you want to lose your shirt, that is."

== Reviews ==
- Games #9
- Jeux & Stratégie #58
- Games & Puzzles #57
