= Buccaneer (board game) =

Board game

Buccaneer is a British board game created by Geoffrey Bull and published by Waddingtons between the 1930s and 1980s. Bull's creation of Buccaneer is credited with providing the inspiration for his next-door neighbour, Anthony E. Pratt, to create a board game, which eventually led to Pratt creating Cluedo.

== Board design ==
The game board depicts the sea, broken into squares. Around the edges are ports, some owned by players, others being "free ports". At the centre is Treasure Island, upon which are placed semi-realistic looking treasures: diamonds, rubies, pearls, gold bars, and rum barrels.

=== Evolution of design ===
==== 1930s ====
The 1938 version of the game had a roll up canvas board (packaged in a tube) and a playing area of 25 x 25 squares, the Treasure Island in the middle spanning 5 x 5 squares. Complete sets of this version are now very rare and in good condition can sell for more than £100 (as of 2010). This version had 9 rum barrels and 6 of each of the other treasure items.

==== 1950s ====
The game has been revised over the years. A major revision in 1958 saw the playing area change to a folding board with a square cut out for a plastic tray insert as Treasure Island. The island shrank to 4 x 4 squares and the playing area to 24 x 24 squares. However, the 1958 version continued to be a 6 player game.

At least three versions of the game appeared in this format, the 'small box' version with all the pieces and cards in a small box and a separate board which was made quite thick and heavy, then there came the 'large box' version where the box now contained the folded board. Both versions used the same basic graphics until these were replaced by the 'blue box' version with excited Pirates finding a treasure chest displayed on the cover. A box insert now came with 'Treasure island' graphics, palm trees etc.

==== 1960–70s ====
Important changes in the late 1960s–1970s saw the number of players fall from 6 to 4. The playing area shrank from 24x24 squares to 20x20 squares, ports were relocated or lost, and treasure available was reduced to 5 of each type.

== Game play ==
The players each have a plastic ship which they can sail to Treasure Island and pick up a "Chance Card." These cards contain instructions, either bad ("You are blown to Cliff Creek") or good ("Take treasure up to 5 in total value"). The treasure is placed inside the ship, which can contain up to two treasures, and the player can sail back to home port to unload the treasure, or trade treasure and crew at the other ports.

Players can attack other players' ships during the game and capture their treasure or crew. The number of spaces a player can move and outcomes of battles are decided on the crew cards held in the hand of each player.

In all versions since the 1958 version (and perhaps earlier) the winner is the first to collect 20 points worth of treasure.

=== Treasure table ===
Treasure Type	Points Value
Diamond	5 points
Ruby	5 points
Gold	4 points
Pearls	3 points
Rum	2 points

== Other versions ==
The US version of the game was called Trade Winds and used slightly different rules and board additions. The winning condition was not changed, gathering treasure worth 20 points at the player's home port.

To coincide with the Pirates of the Caribbean movies, a special Pirates of the Caribbean edition of Buccaneer was launched in 2006.

== Reviews ==
- Games & Puzzles
