= Topple (game) =

Board game

Topple is a board game published in 1983 by Waddingtons, a now-defunct company specializing in board games.

== Contents ==
Topple is a game in which players play pieces of their color on various parts of the podium to score points without causing a topple.

The board is a 5-by-5 grid of 25 spaces arranged into five levels and balanced on a spindle. Each player takes 12 pieces of their chosen color to start the game. One at a time, players roll a die and place a piece of their color on the indicated level (for a roll of 1 through 5) or on any level of their choice (for a roll of 6). A piece may be stacked on top of those in an already-occupied space.

Points are scored as follows:

- For completing a row of five in any direction: three points, plus one extra point for each stack in the row topped by that player's color.
- For adding a piece to a stack in a completed row of five: one point for each stack in the row topped by that player's color.
- For adding a piece to a stack that is already at least three high: one point for each piece of that player's color in the stack.

A player may score under two or more of the above rules with a single play.

A round ends when all pieces have been played or when one or more pieces fall off the board for any reason, referred to as a "topple." If a topple occurs, the player responsible for causing it loses 10 points; in addition, if it occurs as a direct result of a piece being placed on the board, the previous player scores three bonus points. The board is then cleared and a new round begins.

The game continues until at least one player reaches or exceeds an agreed-on score at the end of a round, whereupon the high scorer wins.

== Reception ==
Brian Walker reviewed Topple for Games International magazine, and gave it 4 stars out of 5, and stated that "Like darts and snooker, dexterity is considerably enhanced by a few jars of one's favourite beverage. So there you have it, Topple – the idea game after a tipple."

== Reviews ==
- Jeux & Stratégie #27
