= Victor Watson =

British businessman and philanthropist (1928–2015)

- Born: Victor Hugo Watson; 26 September 1928; Leeds, England
- Died: 25 February 2015 (aged 86)
- Other name: Mr. Monopoly
- Education: Bootham School; Clare College, Cambridge
- Occupations: Businessman, heir, philanthropist
- Known for: Waddingtons Ltd
- Spouse: Sheila Bryan (m. 1952)
- Children: 2

Victor Hugo Watson CBE (26 September 1928 – 25 February 2015) was a British businessman and philanthropist. He served as the Chairman of Waddingtons from 1977 to 1993. Waddingtons employed over 3,000 people, mainly in Leeds, and were involved in printing, packaging, games and playing cards. He was sometimes known as "Mr Monopoly".

== Early life ==
Victor Hugo Watson was born on 26 September 1928 in Leeds, Yorkshire, England. He grew up in Horsforth near Leeds. His paternal grandfather, also named Victor Hugo Watson, acquired the rights to the board game Monopoly from Parker Brothers in 1934. His father, Norman Watson, popularised the board game Cluedo. His mother was named Ruby Watson. He had two brothers, Beric born in 1932 and John born in 1943

He was educated at Bootham School, a private boarding school in York. He then studied at Clare College, Cambridge, matriculating in 1948 after serving as a 2nd Lieutenant in the Royal Engineers and graduating with an MA degree.

== Career ==
He started his career at Waddingtons in 1951. He then served as its chairman from 1977 to 1993. He rejected attempts by Robert Maxwell to acquire the company in 1980. He was known as "Mr Monopoly".

He served on the boards of directors of Yorkshire Television and the Leeds and Holbeck Building Society. He was the chairman emeritus of the Leeds Chamber of Commerce. He published a history of John Waddington Ltd 2008.

He was a director of John Foster plc, Topps Tiles plc. and a president of the British Printing Industries Federation

He was awarded the Order of the British Empire in 1987. He was the 2007 recipient of the Outstanding Contribution to the Printing Industry award from the British Printing Industries’ Federation and the 2009 Individual Award for Excellence from the Yorkshire Post Excellence in Business Awards.

He was Chairman of Governors at Gateways School for 25 years and remained a governor until his death.

He was High Sheriff of West Yorkshire during the year 1989 – 90 and he became a Deputy Lieutenant of West Yorkshire in 1991.

He was awarded an Honorary Degree, Doctor of Laws, by the University of Leeds in July 1994 and an Honorary Degree, Doctor of the University by Leeds Metropolitan University (now Leeds Beckett University) in 2001.

He was awarded the Leeds Award in 2013 in recognition of his enormous contribution to the city of Leeds throughout his life.

== Philanthropy ==
He served on the Council of the University of Leeds. Additionally, he served as the Chairman of the Board of Governors of the Gateways School in Harewood and as a member of the Board of Trustees of the Martin House Hospice, a children's hospice in Wetherby. He was also the President Emeritus of the Northern Division of Mencap. He was a co-founder of the Leeds International Piano Competition.

== Personal life ==
He married Sheila May Bryan in 1952. They had two daughters, Amanda and Sally. At the time of his death he had five grandchildren. He was a collector of antique maps.

== Death ==
He died on 25 February 2015, aged 86 after a lengthy illness of Parkinson's disease.

== Bibliography ==
- Victor Watson. The Waddingtons Story: From the Early Days to Monopoly, the Maxwell Bids and into the Next Millennium (Jeremy Mills Publishing, 2008).
