= Air Charter (game) =

Board game by Waddingtons

- Air Charter Box Cover
- Designers: John King whilst stationed at RAF Topcliffe, 1970.
- Publishers: Waddingtons
- Players: 2–4
- Setup time: 5–15 minutes
- Playing time: Approximately 1.5–3 hours
- Chance: Medium (dice rolling, card drawing)
- Skills: Calculation, Resource management

Air Charter is a board game previously published by Waddingtons. The game is named after the concept of air charter, the commercial use of aircraft on non-established flight routes.

The game is set in Australasia and Southeast Asia. The scenario involves a number of small companies competing for air freight business where the transportation is between the lesser known airfields.

There are 2 games, the short game designed more for younger players and as an introduction to the basic flying rules of the game. The more complex full game involves more by way of trading strategy.

== History ==
The history of Air Charter can be traced back to 1970. It was made around the same time as a similar game called The Business Game which was originally known as Mine a Million by John Waddington Ltd (a.k.a. Waddingtons).

== Equipment ==
Game tokens

Each player is represented by a small plastic aircraft with a peg for carrying the freight tokens. There are four aircraft differentiated by colour. The aircraft are moved around the flight paths between airfields making use of a single die.

Game board

The games also includes the playing board representing a map of Australasia and Southeast Asia, four fuel gauges, freight cards, incident cards, paper money and several plastic pyramid shapes representing freight of three types, special foodstuffs (white), basic foodstuffs (white) and machinery (coloured).

The board is marked up with airfields which are connected by air lanes. Airfields have runways, some with two at right angles to each other some with just one. Every airfield has a Control Area where the planes circle before landing. Four of the airfields, Manila, Makassar, Derby and the Palau Islands act as home airfields for the four players. Finally the airfield has a warehouse where the foodstuffs and machinery tokens (pyramids) are stored.

The fuel gauges are marked off in fuel units and freight units. Each fuel unit represents 70 gallons of aviation fuel. The more fuel a plane carries the less freight it can carry.
