= Blockword =

Word puzzle board game

Blockword is a board game published by Waddingtons in 1976.

== Gameplay ==
Blockword is a two-player word game.

== Reviews ==
- Games #3
- Games & Puzzles #52
