= Mine a Million =

Board game

- The Business Game Box Cover
- Publishers: Waddingtons
- Players: 2–6
- Setup time: 5–15 minutes
- Playing time: Approximately 1.5–3 hours
- Chance: Medium (dice rolling, card drawing)
- Skills: Calculation, Resource management

Mine a Million or The Business Game is a 1965 board game for 2-6 players previously published by Waddingtons. The game models the economic business of mining tin and gaining profit by transporting it to markets. The "million" in the game's title refers to the target profit players must reach.

The game is set in a developing country where transport economy is vital. In this country, the Minister for Transport has decreed that all transport must travel fully loaded. This brings in the concept of subcontracting.

== History ==
The game was designed by the British brothers Peter and Philip Bergner, together with their respective wives Kathleen and Audrey Bergner. The game was sold to Waddingtons in 1965. It was later rebranded by Waddingtons as The Business Game.

== Equipment ==
Playing tokens

The game consists of a playing board, 12 mine derricks (2 of each of 6 colours), 6 lorries, 5 barges, 2 ships, 90 pyramids (15 of each of 6 colours), 24 cubes (4 of each of 6 colours), 26 Production Cards, 6 Canal Company Title Deeds, 2 Production Debit Cards, 1 die and paper money comprising sterling and dollars.

== Gameplay ==
The Business Game playing board

Players mine, transport and sell tin in the form of production units. Each player is in control of a pit head with initially a single mining derrick.

Tin is produced, after an initial allocation, at the mine by the role of a die. If this tin can be transported to Newport it can be sold for Sterling at Newport warehouse. This money can be used to pay for more transport (lorries, barges and ships) and a second mine derrick (to increase production).

The game goes through 3 phases. Initially, transport is carried out using lorries. During this phase the aim is to build up your capital and then increase production. After a time players will have enough funds to establish a canal company so then players can start to use barges on the canals. This is more expensive, but can transport more tin more quickly to Newport. Finally the players begin to transport the production units across the sea by either barges, more slowly around the coast or more quickly by ships. Across the sea at Race Bay, St. John’s or Port Boston units can be sold for dollars. Before exporting by sea, a player needs to have acquired sufficient money (sterling) to pay for the transport rental during the sea journey.

== Rules ==
The game is based around the production, transportation and selling of "units" of tin. The objective is to make one million dollars by selling units in the neighbouring landmass containing three ports. The simplest way to achieve this is by getting 10 units to the furthest port (Port Boston), and another five to either of the nearer two (Race Bay or St. John's).

=== Production ===
At the start of the game, players are given between two and four units depending on a die roll. Units are produced at a mine, represented as a solid square of colour and named for that colour (e.g. Bluebell Mine or Diamond Mine). A further unit is produced each time the player rolls a one or a six; this can be increased to three units should the player purchase an additional mining rig (or "working").

=== Transportation ===
There are three forms of transportation in the game: lorry, barge and ship. These vehicles cannot be purchased outright and instead are leased, on the condition that the player has enough units to fill them (or can contract them from other players). The number of vehicles available depends on the number of players, which introduces an element of supply and demand into the game, as players strategically compete for control over the resources.

The first phase of the game is referred to as the lorry phase. Lorries can carry two units (unlike barges and ships, lorries do not have to be fully loaded and may travel with a single unit; lorries can also not carry units belonging to other players) and can travel as far as the Newport Warehouse at the centre of the board. Since lorries are cheap and the players start with very little money and few units, lorries are used to build initial capital.

When a player has accrued sufficient cash, they are likely to move into the barge phase. Barges are slightly slower and considerably more expensive than lorries, but have the advantage that they can carry five units (at least two of which must be the player's own). Additionally barges can make the trip across the sea to the neighbouring continent where units may be sold for dollars, although they must take the circuitous coastal route. A key rule is that a player may not operate both barges and lorries at the same time (even if they are stationary)

Ships are bigger again, able to carry 10 units (five of which must belong to the player) and travel across the ocean in a much more direct fashion than barges. They are also considerably more expensive, and incapable of travelling inland to the mines; instead players must first transport their units to the central warehouse, from where ships can begin their journey. It is possible to win a game without employing the use of ships.

=== Selling ===
All financial business must be conducted before a player rolls, including the selling of units. Although units can be sold at the mine, the low value of these units means this is rarely done, except when a player is short of cash. Instead units are transported either to the Newport Warehouse, where they are worth £20,000 each, or to one of the overseas ports, where prices are either $40,000 (at the closer destinations of Race Bay or St. John) or $80,000 (at the more distant Port Boston) per unit depending on which port they are taken to.

=== Cards ===
When a player rolls a one or a six, in addition to producing a unit (or units), they also receive a card. Each card has an event that can be either positive or negative ranging from free transportation for units to one of the foreign ports, to an earthquake that destroys all the units in the warehouse.

== Strategy ==
One of the key strategies is to compel other players to complete inland barge loads from their minehead to the warehouse and to complete sea transport loads and these lessees are charged money for the privilege.

=== The end game ===
The first player to acquire a million dollars is the winner.

== Variants ==
In 1970 Mine a Million was rebranded as The Business Game. Aside from the rebranding, the only difference was that 'The Business Game' came in a smaller box, and the board was folded into thirds rather than in half.
