= Equate (game) =

Board game

Equate is a board game made by Conceptual Math Media where players score points by forming equations on a 19x19 game board. Equations appear across and down in a crossword fashion and must be mathematically correct. Because of its characteristics, the game is often described as a Scrabble with math.

== About ==
Equate can be beneficially used in both a classroom and as a board game for the family. To earn higher scores, a player must use division or fraction or land premium board positions. For 2 to 4 players or teams. It is recommended to be played by ages 10 and up.

== Benefits ==
The use of fractions stimulates the players interest towards fractions and motives them to want to learn more about fractions. In order to get higher scores, players are constantly taking advantage of premium board positions. Equate uses large numbers. Single digits placed adjacent to one another creates even larger numbers. Equate is also strategically challenging for advanced players who are already good at math. The game adapts to many different levels of play.

== Junior Tile Set ==
Beginner version. Contains counters that include whole numbers with more 0s and 1s than the original set of counters, fractions with denominator 2, the four basic operations with more addition and subtraction than multiplication and division counters, and equality symbols.

== Advanced Tile Sets ==
Advanced Tile Sets take the game of Equate to a higher mathematical level. This particular sets includes 197 tiles with positive and negative integers imprinted on them, integer exponents, fractions, the four basic operations, and equal symbols. The additional tiles are sold separately, not with the board.

== See also ==
- Equals (game)
