= Careers (board game) =

1955 Parker Brothers board game

- Box cover and game layout, Winning Moves edition
- Designers: James Cooke Brown
- Publishers: Winning Moves; Parker Brothers; Pressman Toy Corporation; Waddingtons
- Publication: 1955
- Players: 2 to 6
- Setup time: 5-10 minutes
- Playing time: 45-90 minutes
- Chance: Medium
- Skills: Roll-and-Move; Win Condition Choice; Money Management

Careers is a board game first manufactured by Parker Brothers in 1955 for $2.97 US; it was most recently produced by Winning Moves Games. It was devised by the sociologist James Cooke Brown. Victory conditions (a secret "Success Formula") consist of a minimum amount of fame, happiness and money (designated as fortune and counted in thousands of dollars) that the player must gain. Players (from two to six) set their own victory conditions before the game begins, the total of which must be sixty or one hundred (the higher total is recommended when only two people are playing).

So for example in a regular multi-player game a player can set a goal of 20 hearts of happiness, 20 stars of fame, and 20 thousand dollars of fortune, or 45 hearts, 15 thousand dollars and no interest in any fame.

== Gameplay ==
The square-shaped board consists of an outer track and several minor loops (called occupation paths), each of which starts and ends at a space on the outer track. Inside the occupation path, the players may accumulate or lose some of their fame, happiness, and fortune until reaching their respective goals. There is a track for college where one receives a degree, which causes one's annual salary to grow upon completing each full round of the board, and affects other aspects of the game as listed in the cards and on the board squares.

Originally there were eight loops, but that was later simplified to six. Some fame, happiness and money ("victory points") can be obtained on the outer track, but victory points can be obtained more quickly on the occupation paths. Each occupation path has more opportunities for certain types of victory points than others (e.g., in Hollywood there are many opportunities to get fame points, but less for money or happiness). Each occupation also has certain minimum entry requirements.

In the oldest versions of the game, players landing on a square occupied by another player are "knocked to the park bench" in one corner of the board, where they must throw a 5, 7, 11, or a 'double' to move on. Another corner has a square for a "Bermuda holiday" where players throwing below 7 can stay and accumulate happiness points. Another corner has a square for hospital fees, which must be paid to the bank or to another player who has obtained a medical degree by going to the 'university' (later called 'college') occupation path.

Occupation paths offer opportunities to collect extra points and to increase their annual salary, which is collected when passing the start square or doubled if a player lands on it. However, there are a number of squares in the occupation paths with negative consequences, such as being sent to the park bench, having a salary cut or paying hospital fees. Completion of an occupation path enables a player to pick up an 'experience' card, which they can use instead of rolling the dice. These enable the player to move one, two or three squares. If a player completes a single occupation path several times, they can pick up multiple experience cards.

Other 'opportunity' cards are collected when landing on particular squares on the outer track which gives a player the option to move to an occupation path. Some of these cards are special or golden opportunities and enable the player to begin the occupation path without the usual prerequisites (usually a payment, a particular degree or having completed another occupation path).

An unusual feature of this game compared to more modern board games is that individual players need to record much information on their own scoresheet, such as annual salary, degrees earned and number of times occupation paths have been completed.

Towards the end of the game, players can trade cards for money or other favors (such as not knocking to the park bench).

== Reception ==
Games magazine included Careers in their "Top 100 Games of 1980", praising it as a "classic family game" that is "Good for two to six players".

== Reviews ==
- Games & Puzzles
- The Playboy Winner's Guide to Board Games
- Family Games: The 100 Best
