= Waddingtons =

British manufacturer of card and board games

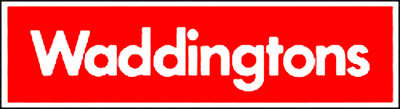
- Industry: Board & card games
- Founded: 19th century (as a printing firm), 1922 (gaming company)
- Defunct: 1994
- Fate: Acquired
- Successor: Hasbro, Waddingtons (Winning Moves Games UK)
- Headquarters: Leeds & London
- Products: Monopoly; Cluedo; Waddingtons Christmas Jigsaws; Playing cards

Waddingtons was a British manufacturer of card and board games. The company was founded by John Waddington of Leeds, England and the manager, actor and playwright Wilson Barrett, under the name Waddingtons Limited. The name was changed in 1905 to John Waddington Limited, then Waddington's House of Games, then Waddington Games, and finally just Waddingtons.

== Founding and history ==
The company was established as a printing business, and at first 'practically all its business related to the theatre'. It entered into game production in 1922, due to a boom in demand for playing cards around World War I. Waddingtons subsequently sold both original games (especially tie-ins for UK television programmes) and games licensed from other publishers.

Waddingtons became the UK publisher of the US Parker Brothers' Monopoly, while Parker licensed Waddingtons' Cluedo. In 1941, the British Directorate of Military Intelligence section 9 (MI9) had the company create a special edition of Monopoly for World War II prisoners of war held by the Germans. Hidden inside these games were maps, compasses, real money and other objects useful for escaping. They were distributed to prisoners by fake charitable organisations. In 2024, an immersive, life-sized monopoly was created in Leeds in honor of Waddingtons.

In the years 1971 to 1985 the firm printed 13 different sets of postage stamps for the Hong Kong Post Office.

Victor Watson, the grandson of Victor Hugo Watson was its chairman from 1977 to 1993. While well known for games, they never provided more than 15% of profit; Victor continued his father Norman's emphasis on improving packaging technology, such as folding cartons and microwave trays. From the 1970s, the popularity of video games hurt game sales, and after Victor's retirement, the company was bought by Hasbro in 1994.

Beginning in 1994, Christmas-themed jigsaw puzzles were released annually until 2007. The first twelve in the series depicted a scene from a Victorian-era Christmas. The final puzzle depicted a scene from the fairy tale Cinderella. The small number of puzzles, combined with them being limited editions, has made these puzzles highly collectable. Further jigsaws have been produced since 2010 by a new company, using the same brand name.

== Games ==
Among the games published by Waddingtons were:

- 4000 A.D.
- 15 Love
- Air Charter
- Astron
- Battle
- Battle of the Little Big Horn
- Bewitched
- Bigfoot
- Black Box
- Blast Off!
- Blockbusters (standard, Junior, Gold Run card game, and Super- 2nd edition game with Gold Run included)
- Blockword
- Boggle
- Bombshell
- Buccaneer
- Campaign
- Camelot
- Careers
- Cluedo (1949)
- Crazy Crocodiles (1988)
- Don't Miss The Boat
- Escape from Atlantis
- Equals
- Exploration
- Formula One
- Game of Nations
- Go (not the Chinese game of Weiqi, but based on world travel)
- GHQ (1939, withdrawn 1940)
- Golfwinks
- Grade Up to Elite Cow
- Key to the Kingdom
- Keyword
- Kimbo
- Lexicon (1932)
- Lose Your Shirt
- Lost Valley of the Dinosaurs
- Major Battles and Campaigns of General George S. Patton (1973)
- Make-Shift (1980)
- Milestones
- Monopoly
- Mine a Million (rebranded as The Business Game)
- Ouija
- Pit (game)
- Pony Express (game)
- Purple People Eater
- Railroader
- Ratrace
- Rich Uncle (board game)
- Risk
- Safari Round Up
- Scoop!
- Sorry!
- Speculate (Share Trading game)
- Spy Ring
- Subbuteo
- Tens (variation of Triominoes)
- Tour of London
- Twelve Days of Christmas Super Delux Double sides Puzzle
- Top Trumps
- Topple (game)
- Totopoly
- Treasures and Trapdoors (game)
- UNO (under licence from International Games Inc)
- Ulcers
- The Vampire Game
- Whot!
