= List of Fantasy Flight games =

This is a list of games released by Fantasy Flight Games. It consists of board games, role-playing games and card games.

== Board games ==
Board Game	Edition	Release year	Image	Expansions	Expansion Type	Expansion Release Year
A Game of Thrones		2003		A Dance with Dragons		2012
A La Carte		1989		Dessert		2010
Ad Astra		2009		-		
Age of Conan		2009		-		
Android		2008		-		
Android: Infiltration		2012		-		
Android: Mainframe		2016		-		
Android: Netrunner		2012		-		
Anima				Shadow of Omega		2006
Anima				Beyond Good and Evil		2008
Anima				Twilight of the Gods		2011
Arcana		2005		-		
Arkham Horror		2005		Curse of the Dark Pharaoh		2006
Arkham Horror		2005		Dunwich Horror		2006
Arkham Horror		2005		The King in Yellow		2007
Arkham Horror		2005		Kingsport Horror		2008
Arkham Horror		2005		Black Goat of the Woods		2008
Arkham Horror		2005		Innsmouth Horror		2009
Arkham Horror		2005		Lurker at the Threshold		2010
Arkham Horror		2005		Miskatonic Horror		2011
Arkham Horror		2005		Curse of the Dark Pharoah (Revised)		2011
Aye, Dark Overlord!		2005		-		
BattleLore		2006		Call to Arms		2007
BattleLore		2006		Epic BattleLore		2007
BattleLore		2006		Goblin Skirmishers		2007
BattleLore		2006		Dwarven Battalion		2007
BattleLore		2006		Goblin Marauders		2007
BattleLore		2006		Hundred Years' War: Crossbows & Polearms		2007
BattleLore		2006		Scottish Wars		2007
BattleLore		2006		For Troll and Country		2008
BattleLore		2006		Heroes		2009
BattleLore		2006		Dragons		2010
BattleLore		2006		Creatures		2010
BattleLore		2006		Horrific Horde		2010
BattleLore		2006		Bearded Brave		2010
BattleLore		2006		Code of Chivalry		2011
Battles of Napoleon: The Eagle and the Lion		2010		-		
Battles of Westeros		2010		Wardens of the West		2010
Battles of Westeros		2010		Wardens of the North		2010
Battles of Westeros		2010		Lords of the River		2011
Battles of Westeros		2010		Tribes of the Vale		2011
Battles of Westeros		2010		Brotherhood Without Banners		2012
Battles of Westeros		2010		House Baratheon Army Expansion		2012
Battlestar Galactica: The Board Game		2008		Pegasus		2009
Battlestar Galactica: The Board Game		2008		Exodus		2010
Battlestar Galactica: The Board Game		2008		Daybreak		2013
Beowulf: The Legend		2005		-		
Beowulf: The Movie		2007		-		
Black Gold		2011		-		
Black Sheep		2008		-		
Blood Bowl: Team Manager		2011		-		
Blue Moon		2004		The Flit		2004
Blue Moon		2004		The Mimix		2004
Blue Moon		2004		The Khind		2004
Blue Moon		2004		The Terrah		2004
Blue Moon		2004		The Pillar		2005
Blue Moon		2004		The Aqua		2005
Blue Moon		2004		Allies		2005
Blue Moon		2004		Blessings		2005
Blue Moon		2004		Buka Invasion		2006
Blue Moon City		2006		-		
Britannia		2006		-		
Cadwallon: City of Thieves		2010		The King of Ashes		Unknown
Cave Troll		2002		-		
Chaos in the Old World		2009		The Horned Rat		2011
Chaos Marauders		2009		-		
Citadels		2000		-		
Sid Meier's Civilization: The Board Game		2010		Fame and Fortune		2010
Sid Meier's Civilization: The Board Game		2010		Wisdom and Warfare		2013
Civilization: A New Dawn		2017		-		
Cold War: CIA vs KGB		2012		-		
Colossal Arena		1997		-		
Condottiere		1995		-		
Constantinopolis		2010		-		
Cosmic Encounter		2008		Cosmic Incursion		2010
Cosmic Encounter		2008		Cosmic Conflict		2011
Cosmic Encounter		2008		Cosmic Alliance		2012
Deadwood		2011		-		
Space Hulk: Death Angel		2010		Mission Pack 1		2011
Space Hulk: Death Angel		2010		Space Marine Pack 1		2011
Descent: Journeys in the Dark	First Edition	2005		-		
Descent: Journeys in the Dark	Second Edition	2012		Conversion Kit		2012
Descent: Journeys in the Dark	Second Edition	2012		Lair of the Wyrm		2012
Descent: Journeys in the Dark	Second Edition	2012		Labyrinth of Ruin		2013
Descent: Journeys in the Dark	Second Edition	2012		The Trollfens		2013
Descent: Journeys in the Dark	Second Edition	2012		Shadow of Nerekhall		2014
Descent: Journeys in the Dark	Second Edition	2012		Manor of Ravens		2014
Dragonheart		2010		-		
Drakon		2006		-		
Dungeonquest		2010		-		
Dust		2007		-		
Dust Tactics		2010		Operation Cyclone	Expansions	2011
Dust Tactics		2010		Operation "SeeLöwe"	Expansions	2011
Dust Tactics		2010		Operation Cerberus	Expansions	2011
Dust Tactics		2010		Operation Zverograd	Expansions	2012
Dust Tactics		2010		Operation Hades	Expansions	Unknown
Dust Tactics		2010		The Gunners	Allies	2011
Dust Tactics		2010		Recon Boys	Allies	2011
Dust Tactics		2010		BBQ Squad	Allies	2011
Dust Tactics		2010		The Boss	Allies	2011
Dust Tactics		2010		Medium Assault Walker	Allies	2011
Dust Tactics		2010		Special Ops Rangers	Allies	2011
Dust Tactics		2010		Light Assault Walker	Allies	2011
Dust Tactics		2010		Grim Reapers	Allies	2011
Dust Tactics		2010		Tank Busters	Allies	2011
Dust Tactics		2010		Red Devils	Allies	2011
Dust Tactics		2010		Heavy Assault Walker	Allies	2011
Dust Tactics		2010		Corps Officers	Allies	2012
Dust Tactics		2010		Allies Hero Pack	Allies	2012
Dust Tactics		2010		MCW M3	Allies	2012
Dust Tactics		2010		Battle Grenadiers	Axis	2011
Dust Tactics		2010		Recon Grenadiers	Axis	2011
Dust Tactics		2010		Laser Grenadiers	Axis	2011
Dust Tactics		2010		Medium Panzer Walker	Axis	2011
Dust Tactics		2010		Kommandotrupp	Axis	2011
Dust Tactics		2010		Special Ops Grenadiers	Axis	2011
Dust Tactics		2010		Light Panzer Walker	Axis	2011
Dust Tactics		2010		Axis Gorillas	Axis	2011
Dust Tactics		2010		Axis Zombies	Axis	2011
Dust Tactics		2010		Heavy Recon Grenadiers	Axis	2011
Dust Tactics		2010		Heavy Panzer Walker	Axis	2011
Dust Tactics		2010		Heavy Kommandotrupp	Axis	2012
Dust Tactics		2010		Axis Hero Pack	Axis	2012
Dust Tactics		2010		Axis Panzer-Kampfläufer III	Axis	2012
Dust Tactics		2010		SSU KV47 Walker	SSU	2012
Dust Tactics		2010		SSU Command Squad	SSU	2012
Dust Tactics		2010		SSU Airborne Transport	SSU	2012
Dust Tactics		2010		SSU Close Combat Squad	SSU	2012
Dust Tactics		2010		SSU Battle Squad	SSU	2012
Dust Tactics		2010		SSU Rifle Squad	SSU	2012
Dust Tactics		2010		SSU Commissar Squad	SSU	2012
Dust Tactics		2010		SSU Specialists	SSU	Unknown
Dust Tactics		2010		SSU Hero Pack	SSU	Unknown
Dust Tactics		2010		SSU Airborne Walker Transport	SSU	Unknown
Dust Tactics		2010		SSU Ground Attack Helicopter	SSU	Unknown
Dust Tactics		2010		S-5 Heavy Tank	SSU	Unknown
Dust Tactics		2010		Red Guards Command Squad	SSU	Unknown
Dust Tactics		2010		Red Guards Anti-Tank Squad	SSU	Unknown
Elder Sign		2011		Unseen Forces	Expansions	2013
Elder Sign		2011		Gates of Arkham	Expansions	2015
Elder Sign		2011		Omens of Ice	Expansions	2016
Elder Sign		2011		Grave Consequences	Expansions	2016
Elder Sign		2011		Elder Sign: Omens	Video games	2011
Eldritch Horror		2013		Forsaken Lore		2014
Eldritch Horror		2013		Mountains of Madness		2014
Eldritch Horror		2013		Strange Remnants		2015
Eldritch Horror		2013		Under the Pyramids		2015
Eldritch Horror		2013		Signs of Carcosa		2016
Eldritch Horror		2013		The Dreamlands		2017
Eldritch Horror		2013		Cities in Ruins		2017
Fallout: The Board Game		2017		Fallout: New California		2018
Fortress America	2012 updated release	2012		-		
Fury of Dracula	2006 updated release	2006		-		
Gears of War		2011		Mission Pack 1		2012
Hey, That's My Fish!		2003		-		
Horus Heresy		2010		-		
Ingenious		2004		Travel Edition		2006
Ingenious Challenges		2010		-		
Isla Dorada		2010				
Kingdoms		1994		-		
Kingsburg		2007		To Forge a Realm		2009
Letter of Marque		2009		-		
Letters from Whitechapel		2011		-		
Lord of the Rings		2000		Friends & Foes		2001
Lord of the Rings		2000		Sauron		2002
Lord of the Rings		2000		Battlefields		2007
Lord of the Rings: The Confrontation		2006		-		
Mad Zeppelin		2010		-		
Mag Blast		2006		-		
Magnifico: DaVinci's Art of War		2011		-		
Mansions of Madness	1st Edition	2011		Forbidden Alchemy	Big Expansions	2011
Mansions of Madness	1st Edition	2011		Call of the Wild	Big Expansions	2013
Mansions of Madness	1st Edition	2011		Season of the Witch	Small Expansions	2011
Mansions of Madness	1st Edition	2011		The Silver Tablet	Small Expansions	2011
Mansions of Madness	1st Edition	2011		'Til Death Do Us Part	Small Expansions	2011
Mansions of Madness	1st Edition	2011		House of Fears	Small Expansions	2012
Mansions of Madness	1st Edition	2011		The Yellow Sign	Small Expansions	2012
Mansions of Madness	2nd Edition	2016		Beyond the Threshold		2017
Mansions of Madness	2nd Edition	2016		Streets of Arkham		2017
Mansions of Madness	2nd Edition	2016		Sanctum of Twilight		2018
Mansions of Madness	2nd Edition	2016		Horrific Journeys		2018
Mansions of Madness	2nd Edition	2016		Path of the Serpent		2019
Merchant of Venus	Second Edition	2012		-		
Micro Mutants: Evolution		2007		Invasion		2011
Middle-Earth Quest		2009		-		
Moto Grand Prix		2008		-		
New Angeles		2016		-		
Nexus Ops		2005		-		
Olympus		2010		-		
Penguin		2007		-		
Penny Arcade		2009		-		
Rattlesnake		2007		-		
Red November	Original	2008		-		
Red November	Revised Edition	2011		-		
Relic		2013		-		
Rex: Final Days of an Empire		2012		-		
Rockband Manager		2012		-		
Rune Age		2011		Oath and Anvil		Unknown
Runebound	First Edition	2004		-		
Runebound	Second Edition	2005		The Island of Dread	Big Expansions	2005
Runebound	Second Edition	2005		Sands of Al-Kalim	Big Expansions	2007
Runebound	Second Edition	2005		The Frozen Wastes	Big Expansions	2009
Runebound	Second Edition	2005		Mists of Zanaga	Big Expansions	2010
Runebound	Second Edition	2005		Artifacts and Allies	Expansion Packs (Wave 1)	2005
Runebound	Second Edition	2005		Crown of the Elder Kings	Expansion Packs (Wave 1)	2005
Runebound	Second Edition	2005		Relics of Legend	Expansion Packs (Wave 1)	2005
Runebound	Second Edition	2005		The Dark Forest	Expansion Packs (Wave 1)	2005
Runebound	Second Edition	2005		The Sceptre of Kyros	Expansion Packs (Wave 1)	2005
Runebound	Second Edition	2005		The Terrors of the Tomb	Expansion Packs (Wave 1)	2005
Runebound	Second Edition	2005		Avatars of Kelnov	Expansion Packs (Wave 2)	2006
Runebound	Second Edition	2005		Champions of Kellos	Expansion Packs (Wave 2)	2006
Runebound	Second Edition	2005		Cult of the Rune	Expansion Packs (Wave 2)	2006
Runebound	Second Edition	2005		Drakes and Dragonspawn	Expansion Packs (Wave 2)	2006
Runebound	Second Edition	2005		Shadows of Margath	Expansion Packs (Wave 2)	2006
Runebound	Second Edition	2005		Walkers of the Wild	Expansion Packs (Wave 2)	2006
Runebound	Second Edition	2005		Beasts and Bandits	Expansion Packs (Wave 3)	2007
Runebound	Second Edition	2005		Rituals and Runes	Expansion Packs (Wave 3)	2007
Runebound	Second Edition	2005		The Cataclysm	Expansion Packs (Wave 3)	2007
Runebound	Second Edition	2005		The Seven Scions	Expansion Packs (Wave 3)	2007
Runebound	Second Edition	2005		Traps and Terrors	Expansion Packs (Wave 3)	2007
Runebound	Second Edition	2005		Weapons of Legend	Expansion Packs (Wave 3)	2007
Runebound	Second Edition	2005		Battlemage	Character Decks	2006
Runebound	Second Edition	2005		Blade Dancer	Character Decks	2006
Runebound	Second Edition	2005		Runemaster	Character Decks	2006
Runebound	Second Edition	2005		Shadow Walker	Character Decks	2006
Runebound	Second Edition	2005		Spiritbound	Character Decks	2006
Runebound	Second Edition	2005		Wildlander	Character Decks	2006
Runewars		2010		Banners of War		2011
Sky Traders		2012		-		
Smileyface		2010		-		
StarCraft		2007		Brood War		2008
Star Wars: Rebellion		2016		Rise of the Empire		2017
Talisman	Fourth Edition	2007		The Dungeon	Big Expansions	2009
Talisman	Fourth Edition	2007		The Highland	Big Expansions	2010
Talisman	Fourth Edition	2007		The Dragon	Big Expansions	2011
Talisman	Fourth Edition	2007		The City	Big Expansions	2013
Talisman	Fourth Edition	2007		The Reaper	Small Expansions	2008
Talisman	Fourth Edition	2007		The Frostmarch	Small Expansions	2009
Talisman	Fourth Edition	2007		The Sacred Pool	Small Expansions	2010
Talisman	Fourth Edition	2007		The Blood Moon	Small Expansions	2012
Talisman	Fifth Edition	2024		-		
Tannhäuser	Revised Edition	2010		Reich Troop Pack		2010
Tannhäuser	Revised Edition	2010		Union Troop Pack		2010
Tannhäuser	Revised Edition	2010		Caitlin "Hoax" Lamsbury		2010
Tannhäuser	Revised Edition	2010		Asteros		2011
Tannhäuser	Revised Edition	2010		Operation Daedalus		2011
Tannhäuser	Revised Edition	2010		Oksana		2011
Tannhäuser	Revised Edition	2010		Hoss Harbinger		2011
Tannhäuser	Revised Edition	2010		Equipment Cards		2011
Tannhäuser	Revised Edition	2010		Shogunate Troop Pack		2011
Tannhäuser	Revised Edition	2010		Mizu Kage		2011
Tannhäuser	Revised Edition	2010		Itami		2011
Tannhäuser	Revised Edition	2010		Natalya		2011
Tannhäuser	Revised Edition	2010		Operation Hinansho		2011
Tannhäuser	Revised Edition	2010		Matriarchy Troop Pack		2012
Tannhäuser	Revised Edition	2010		Edison		2012
Tannhäuser	Revised Edition	2010		Frankenstahl		2012
The Adventurers: The Pyramid of Horus		2011		-		
The Adventurers: The Temple of Chac		2009		-		
The Hobbit		2010		-		
Through the Desert		1998		-		
Tide of Iron		2007		Days of the Fox	Expansions	2008
Tide of Iron		2007		Normandy	Expansions	2008
Tide of Iron		2007		Fury of the Bear	Expansions	2011
Tide of Iron		2007		Designer Series	Scenarios	2008
Tribune: Primus Inter Pares		2008		Expansion		2008
Twilight Imperium	First Edition	1997		The Borderlands		1997
Twilight Imperium	First Edition	1997		Twilight Armada		1998
Twilight Imperium	First Edition	1997		Distant Suns		1998
Twilight Imperium	First Edition	1997		The Outer Rim		1998
Twilight Imperium	Second Edition	2000		Hope's End		2001
Twilight Imperium	Third Edition	2004		Shattered Empire		2006
Twilight Imperium	Third Edition	2004		Shards of the Throne		2011
Twilight Imperium	Fourth Edition	2017		Prophecy of Kings	Expansion	2020
Twilight Imperium	Fourth Edition	2017		Volume 1	Codex	2020
Twilight Imperium	Fourth Edition	2017		Volume 2	Codex	2021
Twilight Imperium	Fourth Edition	2017		Volume 3	Codex	2022
Ugg-Tect		2009		-		
Ventura		2011		-		
World of Warcraft: The Adventure Game		2008		-		
World of Warcraft: The Board Game		2005		The Burning Crusade		Unknown
World of Warcraft: The Board Game		2005		The Shadow of War		Unknown
War of the Ring	First Edition	2004		-		
Warrior Knights		2006		Crown and Glory		2007
Wiz-War		2012				
XCOM: The Board Game		2015		Evolution		2016

== Card games ==
=== Collectible card games ===
- Star Wars: Destiny
  - Awakenings (2016)
  - Spirit of Rebellion (2017)
  - Empire at War (2017)
  - Legacies (2018)
  - Way of the Force (2018)
  - Across the Galaxy (2018)
  - Convergence (2019)
  - Spark of Hope (2019)
  - Covert Missions (2020)
- Star Wars: Unlimited
  - Spark of Rebellion (2024)
  - Shadows of the Galaxy (2024)
  - Twilight of the Republic (2024)
  - Jump to Lightspeed (2025)
  - Legends of the Force (2025)
  - Secrets of Power (2025)
  - A Lawless Time (2026)
  - Ashes of the Empire (2026)

=== Living card games ===
- A Game of Thrones: Second Edition
  - Westeros Cycle Chapter Packs
    - Taking the Black (2015)
    - Road to Winterfell (2016)
    - The King's Peace (2016)
    - No Middle Ground (2016)
  - Wolves of the North Deluxe (2016?)
- Android: Netrunner (2012)
  - Genesis Cycle
    - What Lies Ahead (2012)
    - Trace Amount (2013)
    - Cyber Exodus (2013)
    - A Study in Static (2013)
    - Humanity's Shadow (2013)
    - Future Proof (2013)
  - Creation and Control Deluxe (2013)
  - Spin Cycle
    - Opening Moves (2013)
    - Second Thoughts (2013)
    - Mala Tempora (2013)
    - True Colors (2014)
    - Fear and Loathing (2014)
    - Double Time (2014)
  - Honor and Profit Deluxe (2014)
  - Lunar Cycle
    - Upstalk (2014)
    - The Spaces Between (2014)
    - First Contact (2014)
    - Up and Over (2014)
    - All That Remains (2014)
    - The Source (2014)
  - Order and Chaos Deluxe (2015)
  - SanSan Cycle
    - The Valley (2015)
    - Breaker Bay (2015)
    - Chrome City (2015)
    - The Underway (2015)
    - Old Hollywood (2015)
    - The Universe of Tomorrow (2015)
  - Data and Destiny Deluxe (2015)
  - Mumbad Cycle
    - Kala Ghoda (2015/2016)
    - Business First (2016)
    - Democracy and Dogma (2016)
    - Salsette Island (2016)
    - The Liberated Mind (2016)
    - Fear the Masses (2016)
- Arkham Horror: The Card Game (2016)
  - The Dunwich Legacy (2017)
  - The Path to Carcosa (2017)
  - The Forgotten Age (2018)
  - The Circle Undone (2019)
  - The Dream-Eaters (2019)
  - The Innsmouth Conspiracy (2020)
  - Edge of the Earth (2021)
  - The Scarlet Keys (2022)
- Legend of the Five Rings (2017)
- Star Wars: The Card Game (2012)
  - Hoth Cycle Expansions
    - The Desolation of Hoth (2012)
    - The Search for Skywalker (2013)
    - A Dark Time (2013)
    - Assault on Echo Base (2013)
    - Battle of Hoth (2013)
    - Escape from Hoth (2013)
  - Edge of Darkness Deluxe (2013)
  - Balance of the Force Deluxe (2013)
  - Echoes of the Force Cycle
    - Heroes and Legends (2014)
    - Lure of the Dark Side (2014)
    - Knowledge and Defense (2014)
    - Join Us or Die (2014)
    - It Binds All Things (2014)
    - Darkness and Light (2014)
  - Between the Shadows Deluxe (2014)
  - Rogue Squadron Cycle
    - Ready for Takeoff (2015)
    - Draw Their Fire (2015)
    - Evasive Maneuvers (2015)
    - Attack Run (2015)
    - Chain of Command (2015)
    - Jump to Lightspeed (2015)
  - Imperial Entanglements Deluxe (2015)
  - Endor Cycle
    - Solo's Command (2015)
    - New Alliances (2016)
    - The Forest Moon (2016)
    - So Be It (2016)
    - Press The Attack (2016)
    - Untitled (2016)
  - Galactic Ambitions (2016)
- Warhammer 40,000: Conquest (2014)
  - Warlord Cycle
    - The Howl of Blackmane (2014)
    - The Scourge (2015)
    - Gift of the Etherals (2015)
    - Zogwort's Curse (2015)
    - The Threat Beyond (2015)
    - Descendants of Isha (2015)
  - The Great Devourer Deluxe (2015)
  - Planetfall Cycle
    - Decree of Ruin (2015)
    - Boundless Hate (2016)
    - Deadly Salvage (2016)
    - What Lurks Below (2016)
    - Wrath of the Crusaders (2016)
    - The Final Gambit (2016)
  - Legions of Death (2016)

=== Licensed card games ===
- Cosmic Encounter: Duel
- The Lord of the Rings: The Card Game
- Marvel Champions: The Card Game
- X-Men: Mutant Insurrection

=== Unique deck games ===
- KeyForge (2018)

== Miniature games ==
- Dust Warfare (2012)
  - Zverograd (2012)
  - Hades (2012)
  - Icarus (2013)
- Star Wars: Armada (2015)
  - Armada Core Set (2015)
  - Dice Pack (2015)
  - Victory-class Star Destroyer Expansion Pack (2015)
  - CR90 Corellian Corvette Expansion Pack (2015)
  - Nebulon-B Frigate Expansion Pack (2015)
  - Assault Frigate Mark II Expansion Pack (2015)
  - Gladiator-class Star Destroyer Expansion Pack (2015)
  - Rebel Fighter Squadrons Expansion Pack (2015)
  - Imperial Fighter Squadrons Expansion Pack (2015)
  - Maneuver Tool Accessory Pack (2015)
  - Home One Expansion Pack (2015)
  - Imperial-class Star Destroyer Expansion Pack (2015)
  - Imperial Raider Expansion Pack (2015)
  - MC30c Frigate Expansion Pack (2015)
  - Rogues and Villains Expansion Pack (2015)
  - Imperial Assault Carriers Expansion Pack (2016)
  - Rebel Transports Expansion Pack (2016)
  - Interdictor Expansion Pack (2016)
  - Liberty Expansion Pack (2016)
- Star Wars: Imperial Assault (2014)
  - Dice Pack (2014)
  - Imperial Villain Packs
    - General Weiss (2015)
    - Royal Guard Champion (2015)
    - Kayn Somos (2015)
    - Stormtroopers (2015)
    - General Sorin (2016)
    - Agent Blaise (2016)
    - ISB Infiltrators (2016)
  - Scum Villain Packs
    - IG-88 (2015)
    - Boba Fett (2015)
    - Hired Guns (2015)
    - Bantha Rider (2016)
    - Dengar (2016)
    - Bossk (2016)
  - Rebel Ally Packs
    - Han Solo (2015)
    - Chewbacca (2015)
    - Rebel Troopers (2015)
    - Rebel Saboteurs (2015)
    - R2-D2 and C-3PO (2015)
    - Wookie Warriors (2015)
    - Alliance Smuggler (2016)
    - Leia Organa (2016)
    - Echo Base Troopers (2016)
    - Lando Calrissian (2016)
  - Big Box Expansions
    - Twin Shadows (2015)
    - Return to Hoth (2015)
    - The Bespin Gambit (2016)
    - Jabba's Realm (2017)
    - Heart of the Empire (2017)
    - Tyrants of Lothal (2018)
- Star Wars Legion (2017)
  - Core Game (2017)
  - Dice, Rulers, and Movement Tools (2017)
  - AT-RT Expansion (2017)
  - Rebel Troopers Unit Expansion (2017)
  - Stormtroopers Unit Expansion (2017)
  - 74-Z Speeder Bikes Expansion (2017)
  - T-47 Airspeeders Expansion (2017)
  - All-terrain Scout Transport Expansion (2017)
  - Snowtrooper Unit Expansion (2017)
  - General Veers Commander Expansion (2017)
  - Fleet Troopers Unit Expansion (2018)
  - Leia Organa Commander Expansion (2018)
  - Priority Supplies Expansion (2018)
  - Barriers Expansion (2018)
  - Desert Ruins Battlemat (2018
  - Desert Junkyard Battlemat (2018)
  - Rebel Commandos Unit Expansion (2018)
  - Han Solo Commander Expansion (2018)
  - Scout Troopers Unit Expansion (2018)
  - Boba Fett Operative Expansion (2018)
  - 1.4 FD Laser Cannon Team Unit Expansion (2018)
  - E-Web Heavy Blaster Team Unit Expansion (2018)
  - Premium Bases (2018)
  - Imperial Royal Guards Unit Expansion (2018)
  - Emperor Commander Expansion (2018)
  - Wookiee Warriors Unit Expansion (2018)
  - Chewbacca Operative Expansion (2018)
  - Jyn Erso Commander Expansion (2018)
  - Rebel Pathfinders Unit Expansion (2018)
  - Orson Krennic Commander Expansion (2018)
  - Deathtroopers Unit Expansion (2018)
  - TX-225 GAVw Occupier Combat Assault Tank Unit Expansion (2019)
  - X-34 Landspeeder Unit Expansion (2019)
  - Sabine Wren Operative Expansion (2019)
  - Bossk Operative Expansion (2019)
  - Downed AT-ST Battlefield Expansion (2019)
  - Rebel Veterans Unit expansion (2019)
  - Tauntaun Riders Unit Expansion (2019)
- Star Wars: X-Wing (2012)
  - X-Wing Core Set (2012)
  - Dice Pack (2012)
  - X-Wing Expansion Pack (2012)
  - TIE Fighter Expansion Pack (2012)
  - Y-Wing Expansion Pack (2012)
  - TIE Advanced Expansion Pack (2012)
  - Millennium Falcon Expansion Pack (2013)
  - Slave I Expansion Pack (2013)
  - A-Wing Expansion Pack (2013)
  - TIE Interceptor Expansion Pack (2013)
  - HWK-290 Expansion Pack (2013)
  - Lambda-class Shuttle Expansion Pack (2013)
  - B-Wing Expansion Pack (2013)
  - TIE Bomber Expansion Pack (2013)
  - Imperial Aces Expansion Pack (2014)
  - Rebel Transport Expansion Pack (2014)
  - Tantive IV Expansion Pack (2014)
  - Z-95 Headhunter Expansion Pack (2014)
  - TIE Defender Expansion Pack (2014)
  - E-Wing Expansion Pack (2014)
  - TIE Phantom Expansion Pack (2014)
  - Rebel Aces Expansion Pack (2014)
  - YT-2400 Freighter Expansion Pack (2014)
  - VT-49 Decimator Expansion Pack (2014)
  - Starfield and Death Star Assault Playmats (2015)
  - Most Wanted Expansion Pack (2015)
  - StarViper Expansion Pack (2015)
  - M3-A Scyk Interceptor Expansion Pack (2015)
  - IG-2000 Expansion Pack (2015)
  - Imperial Raider Expansion Pack (2015)
  - Hound's Tooth Expansion Pack (2015)
  - Kihraxz Fighter Expansion Pack (2015)
  - K-Wing Expansion Pack (2015)
  - TIE Punisher Expansion Pack (2015)
  - X-Wing The Force Awakens Core Set (2015)
  - T-70 X-Wing Expansion Pack (2015)
  - TIE/fo Fighter Expansion Pack (2015)
  - Imperial Assault Carrier Expansion Pack (2015)
  - Ghost Expansion Pack (2016)
  - Inquisitor's TIE Expansion Pack (2016)
  - Mist Hunter Expansion Pack (2016)
  - Punishing One Expansion Pack (2016)
  - Maneuver Dial Upgrade Kit (2016)
  - Imperial Veterans Expansion Pack (2016)
  - Colored Bases and Pegs (2016)
  - Heroes of the Resistance Expansion Pack (2016)
  - ARC-170 Expansion Pack (2016)
  - Special Forces TIE Expansion Pack (2016)
  - Protectorate Starfighter Expansion Pack (2016)
  - Shadow Caster Expansion Pack (2016)
- Wings of War
  - Base Games
    - Famous Aces (2004)
    - Watch Your Back! (2005)
    - Burnings Drachens (2005)
    - The Dawn of World War II (2007)
    - Fire From the Sky (2009)
  - Booster Packs
    - Recon Patrol (2006)
    - Top Fighters (2006)
    - Immelmann (2008)
    - Dogfight (2008)
    - Flying Legends (2008)
    - Eagles of the Reich (2008)
    - Hit and Run (2010)
    - Crossfire (2010)
    - The Last Biplanes (2010)
    - Revolution in the Sky (2010)
  - Deluxe Expansions
    - Balloon Busters (2010)
    - Flight of the Giants (2010)
    - World War I Revised Deluxe Set (2010)
    - The Dawn of World War II: Deluxe Edition (2010)

== Roleplaying games ==
- Anima: Beyond Fantasy
  - Core rulebook (2008)
  - Game master's toolkit (2009)
  - Gaïa 1: Beyond the Dreams (2010)
  - Dominus Exxet: The Dominion of Ki (2011)
  - Those Who Walked Amongst Us (2011)
  - Arcana Exxet: Secrets of the Supernatural (2012)
- Black Crusade
  - Core rulebook (2011)
  - The Game Masters Kit (2011)
  - Hand of Corruption (2012)
  - The Tome of Fate (2012)
- Call of Cthulhu (Nocturnum trilogy)
  - Long Shades (1997)
  - Hollow Winds (1998)
  - Deep Secrets (1999)
- Dark Heresy
  - Core rulebook (2008)
  - Game master's kit (2008)
  - Purge the unclean (2008)
  - The inquisitor's handbook (2008)
  - Disciples of the dark gods (2008)
  - Creatures anathema (2008)
  - The Haarlock's legacy 1: Tattered fates (2009)
  - The Haarlock's legacy 2: Damned cities (2009)
  - The radical's handbook (2009)
  - Ascension (2009)
  - The Haarlock's legacy 3: Dead stars (2010)
  - Blood of martyrs (2010)
  - The Black Sepulchre (2011)
  - Daemon Hunter (2011)
  - The Church of the Damned (2011)
  - Book of Judgement (2012)
  - The Chaos Commandment (2012)
  - The Lathe Worlds (2012)
- Dark Heresy Second Edition
  - Core Rulebook (2014)
  - Game Master's Kit (2014)
  - Forgotten Gods (2014)
  - Enemy Within (2014)
- Deathwatch
  - Core Rulebook (2010)
  - Game Master's Kit (2010)
  - The Emperor Protects (2010)
  - Rites of Battle (2011)
  - Mark of the Xenos (2011)
  - The Achilus Assault (2011)
  - First Founding (2011)
  - The Jericho Reach (2012)
  - Rising Tempest (2012)
  - Honour the Chapter (2012)
  - The Outer Reach (????)
- Genesys
  - Core Rulebook (2017) – Generic roleplaying system based on a variant of the Narrative Dice mechanics used in the Star Wars RPG.
  - Expanded Player's Guide
  - Game Master's Screen
  - Realms of Terrinoth (2018) – Fantasy worldbook based on the world of Mennara featured in the Runewars Miniatures Game universe.
  - KeyForge: Secrets of the Crucible – Crossover Science Fiction and Fantasy worldbook based on the world of The Crucible from the KeyForge card game universe.
  - Android: Shadow of the Beanstalk – Cyberpunk worldbook based on the Android boardgame universe.
- Grimm
  - Core Rulebook (2007)
- Only War
  - Core Rulebook (2012)
  - Game Master's Kit (2012)
  - Final Testament (2013)
  - Hammer of the Emperor (2013)
  - Enemies of the Imperium (2013)
  - No Surrender (2013)
- Rogue Trader
  - Core Rulebook (2009)
  - The Game Master's Kit (2009)
  - Lure of the Expanse (2010)
  - Into the Storm (2010)
  - Edge of the Abyss (2010)
  - The Frozen Reaches (2011)
  - Battlefleet Koronus (2011)
  - Citadel of Skulls (2011)
  - Fallen Suns (2011)
  - Hostile Acquisitions (2011)
  - The Koronus Bestiary (2012)
  - The Soul Reaver (2012)
  - The Navis Primer (2012)
  - Stars of Inequity (2012)
  - Faith and Coin (2013)
- Star Wars Roleplaying Game (three standalone games):
  - Star Wars: Edge of the Empire
    - Beta version (2012)
    - Beginner Game (2012)
    - Core Rulebook (2013)
  - Star Wars: Age of Rebellion
    - Beta version (2013)
    - Beginner Game (2014)
    - Core Rulebook (2014)
  - Star Wars: Force and Destiny
    - Beta version (2014)
- Warhammer Fantasy Roleplay
  - Shades of Empire: Organisations of the Old World (2009)
  - Career Compendium: The Ultimate Career Reference (2009)
  - Core Rulebook (2009)
  - The Adventurer's Toolkit (2009)
  - Game Master's Toolkit (2010)
  - Player's Guide (2010)
  - Game Master's Guide (2010)
  - The Creature Guide (2010)
  - Player's Vault (2010)
  - Game Master's Vault (2010)
  - The Creature Vault (2010)
  - The Gathering Storm (2010)
  - The Winds of Magic (2010)
  - The Edge of Night (2010)
  - Signs of Faith (2010)
  - The Witch's Song (2011)
  - Omens of War (2011)
  - Black Fire Pass (2011)
  - Lure of Power (2011)
  - Faith of Sigmar (2012)
  - Hero's Call (2012)
  - Dreadfleet Captains (2012)
  - Bright Order Magic (2012)
  - Faith of Shallya (2012)
  - The Enemy Within (????)
- Other franchises
  - Arkham Horror: Final Hour
  - Discover: Lands Unknown
  - Fallout
  - Fallout Shelter: The Board Game
  - The Lord of the Rings: Journeys in Middle-earth
  - Virtual
  - Twilight Imperium: Prophecy of Kings expansion
