= Elder Sign =

Elder Sign may refer to:

- Elder Sign (Cthulhu Mythos), a fictional element in the Cthulhu Mythos by H. P. Lovecraft
- Elder Sign (card game), a cooperative card and dice game published by Fantasy Flight Games
- Elder Sign: Omens, a 2011 video game developed by Fantasy Flight Games

== See also ==
- Elder Signs Press, a Michigan-based book publisher
