= Christian T. Petersen =

American game designer

- Born: United States
- Education: BA in Economics, St. Olaf College
- Occupation: Game designer
- Known for: (founder) Fantasy Flight Games, President of Asmodee North America

Christian T. Petersen is a game designer who has worked primarily on board games and role-playing games.

== Early life ==
Christian T. Petersen was born in the United States, but spent his childhood in Denmark; while he was still only just in high school there he founded the company Pegasus Spil Import which imported games from Avalon Hill into Scandinavia, and he also founded Games Weekend, the second games convention in Denmark. Petersen came back to live in the United States in 1991 and started studies for his BA degree in Economics at St. Olaf College in Northfield, Minnesota.

== Fantasy Flight Games ==
Petersen founded Fantasy Flight Publishing in June 1995 after completing four years of college. Petersen at first wanted to call this company Pegasus Publishing but he found that aside from his own first company "Pegasus" had been used as a company name too often so he chose a name evocative of the fantasy flight that a pegasus would take.

Petersen loved European comics and originally intended to use the company to republish three comics for which he had obtained the rights negotiations with European publishers: Lucky Luke, Spirou & Fantasio and Percevan. Petersen started by publishing those licensed comics, and he began importing and distributing more popular titles such as Asterix and Tintin when he found out people wanted them, and he creating Downtown Distribution and started distributing even more titles when he learned people wanted him to do that. Petersen read Comics & Games Retailer, which also printed data regularly about the gaming field, so he took his experience with Danish gaming and started with game publication by designing Twilight Imperium (1997).

Fantasy Flight Publishing became known as Fantasy Flight Games (FFG), and sold Downtown Distribution by early 1998, the last part of its comic book business, to focus on the gaming market instead. Petersen had been a fan of Call of Cthulhu for many years, and this interest led Petersen to get a license from Chaosium to have his company produce a series of supplements for Call of Cthulhu. Petersen and Darrell Hardy wrote the Nocturnum adventure trilogy for Call of Cthulhu: Long Shades (1997), Hollow Winds (1998) and Deep Secrets (1999). Petersen and Kevin Wilson designed the Game of Thrones (2003) wargame, and Doom: The Boardgame (2004).

As CEO of Fantasy Flight Games, Petersen led the company to publish more than 400 titles, making it one of the most successful publishers in the hobby games industry. In addition to his responsibilities as CEO, Petersen managed the day-to-day operations of Fantasy Flight's development and design department. Petersen designed many of Fantasy Flight's games throughout the years, including Twilight Imperium (all editions), the A Game of Thrones board game, World of Warcraft: The Board Game, and The Lord of the Rings Trivia Game, and his credits as co-designer include Diskwars and Vortex (also entitled Maelstrom) with Tom Jolly, the A Game of Thrones CCG with Eric Lang, and The StarCraft Board Game with Corey Konieczka. Christian T. Petersen served as its CEO until FFG's merger with Asmodee in 2014, at which time he moved into his role as CEO of Asmodee North America. On July 30, 2018, it was announced that Petersen would be stepping down from his role as CEO of Asmodee North America at the end of 2018.
