= Operation Hades =

Operation Hades may refer to:

- Operation Hades, which resulted in the Plutonium affair in Germany
- Operation Hades, part of Operation Ranch Hand during the Vietnam war
- Operation Hades, an expansion pack of Fantasy Flight game Dust Tactics
