= Arkham Horror: Mother's Embrace =

- Developer: Artefacts Studio
- Publisher: Asmodee Digital
- Platforms: Nintendo Switch; PlayStation 4; Windows; Xbox One
- Release: WW: March 23, 2021
- Genres: Adventure, tactical role-playing
- Mode: Single-player

Arkham Horror: Mother's Embrace is a digital adaptation of the board game Arkham Horror developed by Artefacts Studio and published by Asmodee Digital. It combines gameplay from adventure games and tactical role-playing games.

== Gameplay ==
Players control a group of investigators in the 1920s, each of whom has a special skill. As they investigate a murder mystery involving the Cthulhu Mythos, players encounter puzzles, as in adventure games. Failing the puzzles causes time to advance, and five failures causes the investigators suffer various penalties, such as performing worse in combat or losing items. Investigators who encounter distressing elements of Lovecraftian horror may suffer blows to their sanity that cause further penalties. These penalties persist throughout a scenario but can be cured afterward, when moving on to the next step in the investigation. Eventually, players come into contact with Cthulhu cultists and other enemies, who must be defeated in turn-based and tactical combat.

== Development ==
Developer Artefacts Studio is based in Lyon, France. Arkham Horror: Mother's Embrace was originally announced in 2018 as Mansions of Madness: Mother's Embrace, an adaptation of Mansions of Madness developed by Luckyhammers. By 2020, Artefacts Studio took over development, and it was reworked to be an adaptation of Arkham Horror. Asmodee Digital released it for Windows, PlayStation 4, Xbox One, and Nintendo Switch on March 23, 2021.

== Reception ==
Reception

Aggregate score
Aggregator	Score
Metacritic	(PC) 48/100 (PS4) 58/100

Review score
Publication	Score
IGN	5/10

On Metacritic, Arkham Horror: Mother's Embrace received unfavorable reviews for Windows and mixed reviews for PlayStation 4. It was one of the worst reviewed games on Metacritic in 2021. IGN said it is passable but does not modernize tropes that have become commonplace. They disliked both the combat and investigating, which they felt were simple and uninspired, respectively. It also received negative reviews from Eurogamer and 4Players.
