= Arkham Horror =

American adventure board game, first published 1987

- Box cover of the second edition
- Players: 1 to 8
- Setup time: 30-60 minutes
- Playing time: 120-240 minutes
- Chance: Moderate
- Skills: Cooperative gaming

Related games
- Mansions of Madness

Arkham Horror is a cooperative adventure board game designed by Richard Launius, originally published in 1987 by Chaosium. The game is based on Chaosium's roleplaying game Call of Cthulhu, which is set in the Cthulhu Mythos of H. P. Lovecraft and other horror writers. The game's second edition was released by Fantasy Flight Games in 2005, with a third edition in 2018.

== Overview ==
The game board is set in Lovecraft's fictional Massachusetts town of Arkham in 1926. Street, building, and outdoor locations are featured. Gates to other planes open throughout the town (represented by tokens placed on the board). Players take on the role of investigators, represented by a character card. Each investigator has several attributes (such as "sanity"), and cards representing items, spells, and other things. The investigators travel through the city, avoiding or fighting the monsters that enter through the gates, visiting city locations to acquire tools, and ultimately entering the gates.

After traveling to the other world and returning, the investigator can try to close the gate. While exploring city locations or other worlds, the investigators face random events which may benefit or harm them. As gates open, a "Doom Track" advances; if the track reaches its end, a powerful horrific creature known as the Ancient One breaks through into Arkham. In the 1987 edition of the game, this ends the game, and all players lose. In the second edition, when the doom track fills, this typically begins a final opportunity for the players to directly defeat the creature and win; otherwise, they lose.

== History ==
Arkham Horror was originally submitted to Chaosium Inc. by Richard Launius as Call of Cthulhu: The Board Game, a new strategic game based on their Call of Cthulhu role-playing game. It was edited in-house by Chaosium, who added such features as the Doom Track, a method to track progress toward the total failure of the players, and was published in 1987 as Arkham Horror. The game won the "Best Fantasy or Science Fiction Boardgame of 1987" award in the Origins Awards, becoming the first Lovecraft themed board game to achieve significant popularity.

Arkham Horror was one of several Lovecraft-based board games submitted by Launius, with other designs from the same period including 'The Trail of the Brotherhood', 'DreamQuests', and 'Imprisoned with the Pharaohs'. Arkham Horror was the only of these games to see professional publication.

The original printing of Arkham Horror sold out. Chaosium announced reprints several times, but they never occurred, and Chaosium discontinued production of the game in 1991.

In 2004 online game company Skotos acquired the rights to Arkham Horror from Richard Launius, and later arranged publication with Fantasy Flight Games. The game underwent several revisions in this process. Skotos reorganized many of the elements in the game for improved cohesion and arranged for it to more carefully follow the maps of Arkham created by Chaosium and used in their own Lovecraft Country: Arkham by Night online game. Launius added several new elements, including clue tokens and some rearrangements to the decks of cards. Finally, Kevin Wilson at Fantasy Flight massively revamped the game, throwing out a roll-and-move system as well as other concepts and also expanding much of the gameplay. The 2005 edition shares art and other elements with Fantasy Flight Games' other Cthulhu Mythos-based game: Call of Cthulhu Collectible Card Game.

The new edition was released in July 2005 and sold out, with a second reprinting also being released in 2005.

In early 2011, Fantasy Flight released Elder Sign, a game based on Arkham Horror but which provides a much faster-paced alternative. By streamlining many of Arkham Horror's mechanics and using dice to solve encounters, games of Elder Sign lasts 90 minutes on average, rather than 2–4 hours.

In 2016, at Arkham Nights, a celebration of Cthulhu games by Fantasy Flight Games, the original designer Richard Launius returned to host a special event using a modified version of the original game. Multiple games were held over the course of the weekend.

In November 2019, Aconyte Books announced a-tie in novels based on the world of Arkham Horror, titled Arkham Horror: Wrath of N’Kai. The novel is set to be published in May 2020.

A video game adaptation, Arkham Horror: Mother's Embrace, was released in March 2021.

== 1987 edition ==
The box cover of the 1987 edition of Arkham Horror

The 1987 version of Arkham Horror has the following game components: a board map of the town of Arkham; 99 playing cards with various events; 50 monster counters; two 4-page investigator rules sheets; eight investigator cards; eight pawns; and markers. The cards and tokens are illustrated with black-and-white drawings and silhouettes. The map of Arkham consists of a set of intertwined routes with a large number of spaces.

There are several locations off the routes, such as Miskatonic University or Dark's Carnival, where a player's investigator may have encounters, or where a gate to another world may appear. The other worlds themselves are in a row at the top of the game board. Encounter events in Arkham are determined by rolling a die and consulting a table for that location.

Investigators usually move a random number of spaces based on the roll of two six-sided dice. The investigator cards are pre-made, with four fixed attributes: Fast Talk, Fight, Knowledge, and Sneak. To successfully use an attribute, the player rolls one six-sided die to get a value equal or below the attribute's value. Paperclips are used to track two numbers that frequently change: Sanity and Strength.

The turns of the investigators are preceded by the "Mythos Phase", where a gate and monsters may appear. Monsters that appear move throughout the town, attacking any investigators they happen upon; seeing some monsters results in a sanity loss. In true Lovecraft fashion, if an investigator in the town loses all Sanity or Strength, they are ignored by the monsters. The collapsed investigator is transported to the Sanitarium or Hospital, as appropriate, for treatment. Such vital losses in the other worlds result in the death of the investigator, and the player must start a new one.

For each new gate that opens, the Doom Counter increases by one; the "Doom of Arkham" occurs if the Doom Counter reaches 14. If this happens, all players lose.

Victory is achieved by closing all of the gates that have opened. Closing a gate requires passing into it to another world, and taking two encounters there; upon return to Arkham, the investigator must attack the gate successfully to close it. Closing a gate reduces the Doom Counter by one.

=== Reception ===
In the April 1991 edition of Dragon (Issue 168), Ken Rolston called the game his "first choice for a board game with [fantasy role-playing game] feel. It has everything I want in this respect." Rolston was saddened that Chaosium had just discontinued production, saying, "If you see a copy of this gem, buy it. Period."

=== Reviews ===
- Games #90
- Jeux & Stratégie nouvelle formule #7 (as "Horreur à Arkham")
- Analog Science Fiction and Fact

== 2005 edition ==
=== Gameplay ===
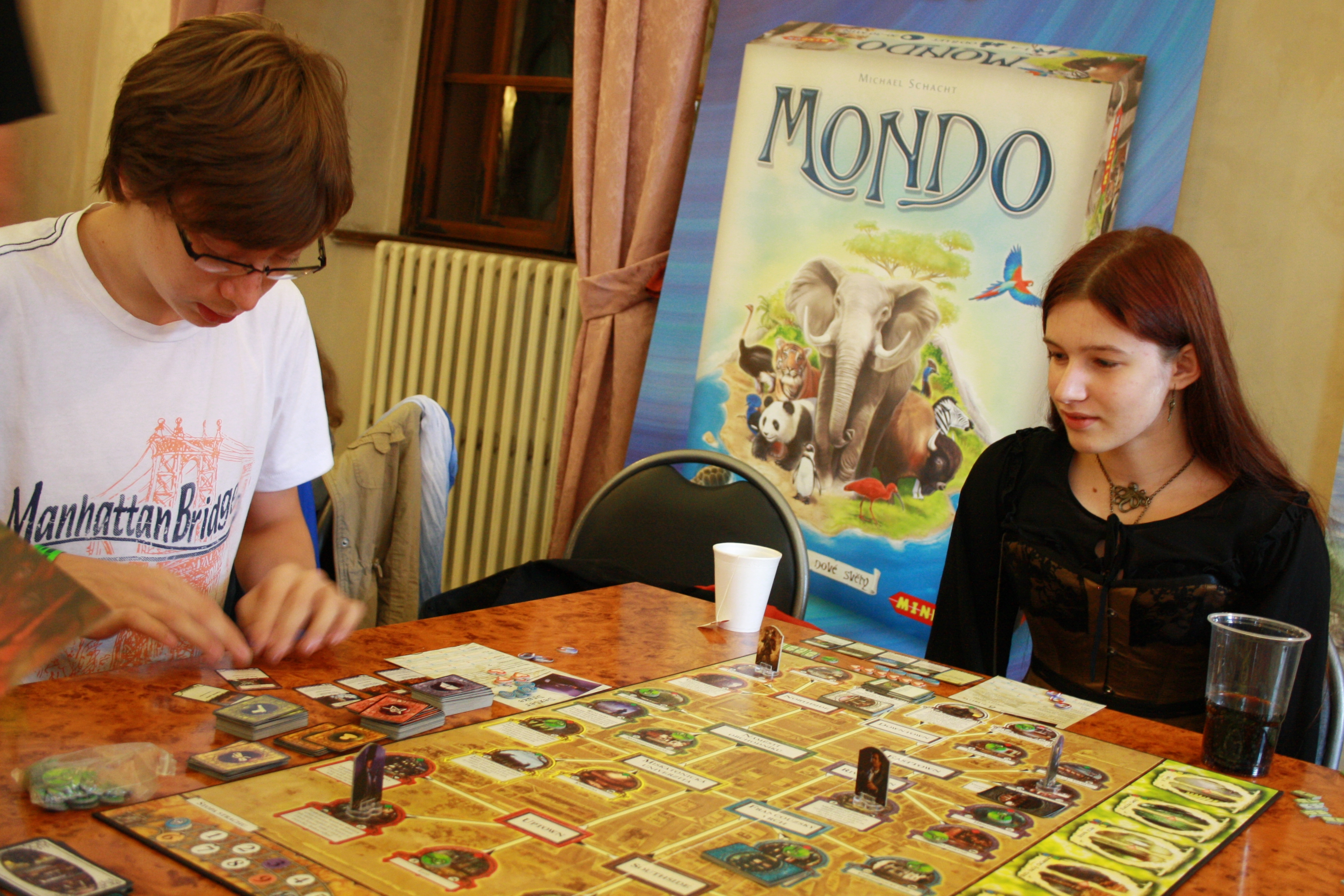
A game of Arkham Horror being played in Prague in 2012

Each player selects an investigator character that is provided with the game. These characters have three pairs of statistics to represent their strengths and weaknesses, and the ability to "slide" their current focus on each scale towards either extreme or keep it relatively average. For example, Lore and Luck is one pair - if the player maximizes their character's Lore, they simultaneously minimize their Luck.

Characters are further defined by a starting inventory and special abilities. Most importantly, each character has the stats of Sanity and Stamina. These respectively measure the character's mental stability and physical health (i.e. hit points). The back of each card includes a brief history for the character, in case players wish to add an element of roleplaying to the game.

Each player's character is placed on the game board at the location specified on their card. They are given any items specified as well as their starting Sanity and Stamina tokens. At this time, the players should also pick which Ancient One they will be attempting to defeat. This is usually done by randomly drawing the Ancient One's card, but can also be selected intentionally if the players choose to do so.

The basic resolution mechanic is to roll a number of six-sided dice equal to the statistic, plus any modifiers. Results of a five or a six on a die is considered a success. Most checks only require a single success, with the general exception of Combat rolls when fighting monsters. For instance, a card may require a Lore -1 roll. If the character has a Lore stat of 4, they would roll three dice and if at least one die lands on a five or six the character has passed the roll (and may gain a benefit), otherwise he or she has failed (and may suffer a consequence).

Characters may also become Blessed, which allows them to succeed on a four or higher; or Cursed, which means they can only succeed on a roll of six. Throughout the game, characters collect Clue tokens; a Clue token can be spent to get a bonus die during a roll (after the original roll fails to produce enough successes). There are Skill cards that can be acquired, increasing a statistic by one as well as granting an extra bonus die when the player spends a Clue token on that particular type of roll.

Each turn, the players move their characters on the board, fight or evade monsters and have Encounters at a location (by drawing cards specific to that board location). They may also purchase items at some locations, or take advantage of other special features. For example, characters who spend a turn at Arkham Asylum will regain a point to their sanity score, or they may spend $2 in-game to regain their maximum sanity. Either way, it takes the place of their normal Encounter card draw for that turn.

Characters who encounter monsters have the option to sneak past them or fight them. Fighting a monster first involves a Sanity check, needing only a single success but losing Sanity tokens indicated on the monster if the roll fails. After that check, the character may cast spells or use weapons to affect the combat. If the monster is not immediately destroyed or removed from the board, they then roll Fight plus any bonuses from weapons, items or spells. Some monsters only require a single success, while others may require several to destroy.

At the end of each turn, the first player draws a card from the Mythos deck. This causes a gate to another world to open, as well as releasing new monsters onto the board, causing existing monsters to move on the board and often adding a new effect to gameplay. If enough monsters appear on the board, they are recycled, and the terror level of Arkham increases, indicating that Arkham is slowly being completely overrun by monsters.

If the terror level rises high enough, stores begin to close and potential allies flee, and the Ancient One will awaken even faster once Arkham becomes completely infested. Weather may make it more difficult to move through the streets or a rumor might require investigators to complete an action in a certain number of turns to prevent even worse effects from happening. After the Mythos card is resolved, play passes clockwise to the next player to start a new turn.

Certain events add tokens to the Ancient One's card, representing how close it is to awakening. Typically, when a new gate opens a token goes onto the Ancient One's card. Gates may be closed by investigators through a die roll. Alternately, a gate may be sealed by spending Clue tokens, or with an Elder Sign item. Sealing a gate prevents another gate from opening in that location again, and using an Elder Sign removes a token from the Ancient One.

If the Ancient One's card reaches a specified number, it awakens and investigators must immediately deal with the threat. Combat against an Ancient One varies, but typically involves making rolls to remove tokens from it, while the Ancient One lowers their stats each turn or takes certain tokens from them. Investigators who lose all of that token type are immediately devoured and removed from the game. If the Ancient One is defeated, the players win; otherwise, the game is over and they have lost.

=== Expansions ===
Arkham Horror has received a total of eight expansions:

1. Curse of the Dark Pharaoh, released in June, 2006, with a revised version released in 2011. This expansion added many new cards to the game, including items and encounters. The theme was that a travelling museum exhibit from Egypt has arrived in Arkham, bringing with it accursed artifacts and strange happenings. Heavy emphasis is placed on Nyarlathotep, one of Lovecraft's iconic Outer Gods.
2. Dunwich Horror, released during Gen Con 2006. Based on Lovecraft's short story The Dunwich Horror, it includes a new board that is placed against the original Arkham Horror board. This new board features locations in the town of Dunwich. Investigators may visit Dunwich by travelling through the Train Station in Arkham or using certain vehicle items. In addition, the game includes new Encounter, Mythos and item cards as well as new mechanics, such as the stalking monster movement, new Great Old Ones, and new mechanics for defeated characters: a character loses their last point of Sanity, they may take a Madness card which imposes restrictions on the character and restores them to their maximum Sanity, instead of losing half of their items and clues; and when they lose their last point of Stamina, they may take a similar Injury card. Plus, a new monster, the Dunwich Horror itself, is provided as a special monster whose powers vary from combat to combat.
3. The King in Yellow, confirmed in October 2006 and released in June 2007. Like Curse of the Dark Pharaoh, it is a card-only expansion, which this time focuses on a mysterious play that is being performed in Arkham. Based on the Robert W. Chambers story The King in Yellow, this expansion introduces the mechanic of the Herald — a special card that permanently alters the game rules. The first Herald is The King in Yellow himself, which causes the Doom track to increase every time the Terror track does, unless the player takes a permanent penalty. Support for The Dark Pharaoh has since been added on the Fantasy Flight Games website as a Herald for the Curse of the Dark Pharaoh expansion. A third Herald has also been added on the Fantasy Flight Games website for the Dunwich Horror expansion.
4. Kingsport Horror, released in June 2008. It is similar to Dunwich Horror in that it is board-based rather than card-based. This expansion adds the additional locations of Kingsport, a new game element of Dimensional Rifts, and aquatic monsters that may move to any other "aquatic" location instead of following normal routes. The expansion also includes new Ancient Ones, new Investigators, new Heralds and introduces Guardians which assist the players much the way Heralds hinder them.
5. Black Goat of the Woods, released at Gen Con in August 2008. Another cards-only expansion, the set adds another Herald, a new membership similar to the Silver Twilight Lodge, a new element called Corruption, and difficulty cards that allow the player to make the game optionally easier or harder. In addition, the expansion includes additional Mythos, Gate, Encounter, Spell, Skill, and Unique and Common item cards to be incorporated into the original game.
6. Innsmouth Horror, announced on the Fantasy Flight Games Website in February 2009 and released in May 2009. The third board expansion adds the town of Innsmouth as well as 16 new investigators, 8 new Ancient Ones, and two new Heralds. Also included are new personal stories cards for investigators, monsters, and encounter cards.
7. The Lurker at the Threshold, announced in February 2010 and released in July 2010. This is a small expansion, including a new herald sheet along with over 100 location cards, new Mythos, Gate cards, spells, etc. This expansion includes 18 Gate Markers, designed to replace original ones, and introduces new challenges for investigators trying to seal them. Also introduced were Relationships, which are cards describing how the investigator to your left is related to you and grants some benefit, and a new mechanic of making pacts with the Lurker itself.
8. Miskatonic Horror, announced in February 2011 and released in July 2011. The eighth expansion adds nearly 450 new cards, including new Skill, Other World, and Mythos cards. Rather than building on the content of the base game, this expansion builds on the content of the other expansions, adding more features that can be used the more other expansions are included. New player reference sheets as well as a new Institution variant were included as well.

=== Reception ===
Ben Kuchera reviewed the game for Ars Technica, and noted that in a game with 700 tokens "brevity is not one of its strengths ... A short game is still measured in hours, and learning to play the game smoothly takes some time. Even with seasoned players, simply setting everything up can take a while, and once you begin adding expansions, the amount of space you need to enjoy the game is increased." He concluded that this may not be a game for new players, or players not used to complicated rules systems, saying, "it's a big, long, complicated game. It's only fun if you have a regular group of gaming friends who get don't mind learning something that's not immediately intuitive. But if you have the space, the time, and the friends... it's worth the investment."

Other reviews:

- Rebel Times #3 (base game)
  - Rebel Times #6 (Curse of the Dark Pharaoh expansion)
  - Rebel Times #11 (Kingsport Horror expansion)
  - Rebel Times #12 (The King in Yellow expansion)
  - Rebel Times #16 (Black Goat of the Woods expansion)

== 2018 edition ==
A third edition of Arkham Horror was released by Fantasy Flight Games on November 1, 2018. This version incorporates design elements from Eldritch Horror and Arkham Horror: The Card Game. An expansion, Dead of Night, was released on October 8, 2019. A second expansion, Under Dark Waves, re-exploring Innsmouth and Kingsport, was released on September 18, 2020. On June 11, 2021, a third expansion titled Secrets of the Order was released, this time taking players to the French Hill neighborhood and the underworld.

== Novels ==
In 2011, a series of novels were published under the Arkham Horror banner via Fantasy Flight Games, beginning with Ghouls of the Miskatonic by Graham McNeill. A new series, beginning with Wrath of N'kai by Joshua Reynolds, began publication in 2020 through Aconyte.

=== Fantasy Flight Games publications ===
==== The Dark Waters ====
- Ghouls of the Miskatonic by Graham McNeill (2011)
- Bones of the Yopasi by Graham McNeill (2012
- Dweller in the Deep by Graham McNeill (2014)

==== Lord of Nightmares ====
- Dance of the Damned by Alan Bligh (2011)
- The Lies of Solace by John French (2012s)
- The Hungering God by Alan Bligh (2013)

==== Standalone novels and novellas ====
- Feeders from Within by Peter J. Evans (2013)
- The Sign of Glaaki by Steven Savile and Steve Lockley (2013)
- The Investigators of Arkham Horror by Katrina Ostrander (2016)
- Hour of the Huntress by Dave Gross (2017)
- Ire of the Void by Richard Lee Byers (2017)
- The Dirge of Reason by Graeme Davis (2018)
- The Deep Gate by Chris A. Jackson (2018)
- To Fight the Black Wind by Jennifer Brozek (2018)
- The Blood of Baalshandor by Richard Lee Byers (2020)
- Dark Revelations by Amanda Downum (2020)

=== Aconyte publications ===
- Wrath of N'kai by Joshua Reynolds (2020)
- The Last Ritual by S. A. Sidor (2020)
- Mask of Silver by Rosemary Jones (2020)
- Litany of Dreams by Ari Marmell (2021)
- The Devourer Below by Josh Reynolds (2021)
- Cult of the Spider Queen by S. A. Sidor (2021)
- The Deadly Grimoire by Rosemary Jones (2022)
- In the Coils of the Labyrinth by David Annandale (2022)
- Secrets in Scarlet: An Arkham Horror Anthology by Charlotte Llewelyn-Wells (2022)
- Lair of the Crystal Fang by S. A. Sidor (2022)
- Shadows of Pnath by Joshua Reynolds (2023)
- The Ravening Deep by Tim Pratt (2023)
- The Bootlegger's Dance by Rosemary Jones (2024)
- Song of Carcosa by Joshua Reynolds (2024)
- Herald of Ruin: The Sanford Files by Tim Pratt (2024)
- The Forbidden Visions of Lucius Galloway by Carrie Harris (2024)
- The Nightmare Quest of April May by Rosemary Jones (2025)
