= Kevin Wilson (game designer) =

American game designer

- Occupation: Game designer

Kevin Wilson is a game designer who has worked primarily on board games and role-playing games.

== Early life and education ==
Wilson received a B.A. in Cognitive Science (Artificial Intelligence) from U.C. Berkeley in 1997, and was active in the interactive fiction community at the time. He wrote several works of interactive fiction — including Once and Future and The Lesson of the Tortoise — and founded the annual Interactive Fiction Competition and the Internet magazine SPAG.

== Career ==
Kevin Wilson has been a game designer since the late 1990s. Wilson co-designed 7th Sea (1998), the second role-playing game from Alderac Entertainment Group, with Jennifer Wick and John Wick. Wilson wrote the adventure Wonders Out of Time (2001), the sequel to Akrasia: Thief of Time (2001) in the "Eden Odyssey" series of adventures from Eden Studios. Wilson is the co-designer of the Spycraft roleplaying game.

Fantasy Flight Games hired Wilson to manage their retooling on the Legends & Lairs line, and he decided to split the line into smaller sublines made up of smaller sourcebooks.

Christian T. Petersen and Wilson designed the wargame A Game of Thrones (2003), which was one of several games published by Fantasy Flight in the American style while the company had been republishing eurogames. Wilson is the author of the RPG book Spellslinger. Petersen and Wilson created a gaming system for Doom: The Boardgame (2004), which was later revised and used in Descent: Journeys in the Dark (2006).

Wilson also designed World of Warcraft: The Board Game (2005), as well as Arkham Horror second edition (with Richard Launius). He also designed Sid Meier's Civilization: The Board Game (2010).

Wilson lives near the Twin Cities.
