= Elder Sign: Omens =

2011 video game

- Developer: Fantasy Flight Games
- Platforms: iOS; Windows PC
- Release: October 31, 2011
- Genre: Board game
- Mode: Single-player

Elder Sign: Omens is a video game developed by Fantasy Flight Games based on a board game of the same name. It was released on iOS on October 31, 2011, and on PC on November 27, 2013.

== Critical reception ==
=== iOS version ===
The iOS version has a Metacritic rating of 87% based on 5 critic reviews.

GameCritics said, "Not only is it a great use of classic horror material with top-notch production, it's a superb portable boardgame that doesn't require the effort and schedule coordination needed to gather a group of friends on the weekend." Gamezebo said, "Rather than simply porting the classics of their catalogue, Fantasy Flight Games has paired a new print release with a great digital version that should have no problem moving boxed copies of their latest game. It's a far lengthier experience than most mobile gamers will be used to in a single session, but after spending an hour in the world of Elder Sign: Omens, you'll begin to wonder how the world could survive without you." 148Apps wrote, "A fantastic, atmospheric game with absolutely gorgeous visuals and tremendous replay value. You'd have to be insane to pass this up, although you may end up that way, regardless." 4players.de wrote, "This is one of the most atmospheric games I have played on the iPad so far, even though this isn't a RPG with dialogues, quests or plot but a simple turnbased game of dice against the clock that's based on luck as well as rudimentary tactics." AppSpy said, "The Lovecraftian mythos is often used and abused as a cheap shortcut for instilling thrills or mystery in to an otherwise bland story or experience; not so with Elder Sign: Omens as it shows off the true terror, danger and madness of messing with the dark unknown in this chilling board game adaption."

=== PC version ===
The PC version earned a score of 85% by CD-Action, which wrote, "Computer adaptation of a tabletop game based on Lovecraft’s work crushes players with distinct atmosphere of ancient tomes, madness, sinister incantations, old cults and Elder Gods."
