= Diskwars =

Tabletop miniature wargame

- Designers: Tom Jolly and Christian T. Petersen, with Tod Gelle
- Publishers: Fantasy Flight Games
- Players: 2–8
- Setup time: 5–10 minutes
- Playing time: 90 minutes
- Chance: Low
- Skills: Strategy, Collecting

Diskwars is a collectible fantasy tabletop miniature wargame designed primarily by Tom Jolly and Christian T. Petersen and first published in 1999 by Fantasy Flight Games.

The game takes its name from its atypical use of cardboard disks to represent military units, commanders, monsters, and battlefield terrain features. Tabletop wargames more commonly use miniatures and scale models for these purposes. The relatively low cost of cardboard play pieces compared to metal or plastic figures was one of the game's two major marketing points. The other was its deliberately collectible nature, inspired by the success of collectible card games such as Magic: The Gathering.

The Diskwars line was discontinued but has recently been brought back by Fantasy Flight Games using the Warhammer Fantasy license.

== Components ==
Disks representing military units vary between roughly 1.5” and 4” in diameter and are printed on both sides with the units' numeric stats, point cost, racial faction, moral alignment (Good, Neutral, or Evil), and any special abilities. 4” disks are used to demarcate notable terrain features such as woods and fortifications. Smaller, roughly 1” disks are used on the sidelines to represent individual spells which are available for casting by magic-capable units. Even smaller square chits are supplied for performing volleys of projectile fire, recording wounds, and marking which units have moved or acted so far in the current turn.

== Collectibility ==
Components are printed on cardboard cards, or flats, and are die-cut for easy separation. One complete set or expansion of Diskwars can contain over 80 different flats. Flats are packaged and sold in small quantities that are partially or totally random. In addition, not all flats are produced in equal quantities, and some disks appear more than once per flat or on more than one flat.

== Gameplay ==
Players first agree upon the number of competing sides, the game's objective (for example, defeat all enemy units, defeat all enemy leaders, or be the first to establish uncontested control of a particular location), and the maximum combined point value of units and spells that each player may field.

Play proceeds in turns, during which each player in rotating order activates three of his as-yet-unactivated units (or all of them if he has less than three). An activated unit may cast a valid spell from its player's hidden stack of remaining spells, use one of its special abilities, perform a projectile attack, or move. After all disks have been activated and the results resolved, melee combat is performed between overlapping enemy disks, then a new turn begins.

Play mechanics conspicuously take the physical form of the game pieces into account. Melee engagements are determined by actual overlap between disks, with larger disks naturally able to engage more, or more disperse, enemies than smaller disks can. Moving a unit is accomplished by flipping it edge-over-edge across the playfield a number of times up to its Movement rating, so a disk's diameter is just as important as this rating in determining how much distance the disk can cover, and is more important when precise positioning is desired. Projectile fire is accomplished by dropping projectile chits from a minimum distance above the playfield; whichever disks they land on are injured, whether friend or foe.

== Reception ==
In 2000 Diskwars won the Origins Award for Best Science Fiction or Fantasy Miniatures Rules of 1999.

== Reviews ==
- Backstab #19
- Envoyer (German) (Issue 47 - Sep 2000)

== Expansions ==
- Moon Over Thelgrim (1999)
- Wastelands (1999)
- Waiqar's Path (1999)
- Broken Shadows (2001)

== Similar games ==
- Diskwars: Legend of the Five Rings (Alderac Entertainment Group)
- Star Trek: Red Alert (Last Unicorn Games)
- Deadlands: Doomtown Range Wars (Fantasy Flight Games)
- Twilight Imperium: Armada (Fantasy Flight Games)
