= Arkham Horror: Curse of the Dark Pharaoh Expansion =

Arkham Horror: Curse of the Dark Pharaoh Expansion is a 2006 board game supplement published by Fantasy Flight Games for Arkham Horror.

== Contents ==
Arkham Horror: Curse of the Dark Pharaoh Expansion is a supplement in which an Egyptian‑themed expansion adds 166 cards—new encounters, gates, spells, allies, penalties, and powerful exhibit items—usable either mixed into the base game or as a standalone visiting museum set.

== Reviews ==
- Pyramid
- Computer Games Magazine
- Rue Morgue
