= Nocturnum =

Campaign setting in the Call of Cthulhu role-playing game

Nocturnum is a campaign setting in the Call of Cthulhu role-playing game. It is one of the few materials produced for the ill-fated d20 version of the game, although it was first published for the standard CoC rules. It was created by Christian T. Petersen and published by Fantasy Flight Games.

== Publication history ==
Fantasy Flight Games published the Nocturnum trilogy of adventures over a span of three years as Long Shades (1997), Hollow Winds (1998) and Deep Secrets (1999). These adventures were set in the contemporary times, as opposed to the core Call of Cthulhu game's 1920s setting, and introduced a new mythos race and created a darker background atmosphere for the adventure. The company's Call of Cthulhu line ended after these three adventures were published. The Nocturnum books were later reprinted for d20 in 2002.

== Plot ==
The story takes place in the town of Snowflake, a small community somewhere in Colorado. The players are visiting the town for pleasure, for business, or are just passing through. The campaign begins on the road to the Clearwater Hotel, where the characters meet for the first time.

At the hotel, a woman named Cynthia Carmichael has been killed in her room, seemingly by a wild animal. The players investigate and are blamed for the murder by the local police.

In reality, Carmichael was killed by a werewolf named Ian McGuire, a slave to a Wilder Shk'ryth who plans to destroy the human race. He had been imprisoned in a nearby mountain for centuries by a local Native American tribe that had been performing a ritual to keep him trapped. He used Ian McGuire to escape.

== Reviews ==
- Dungeon #97 / Polyhedron #145
