= Runebound =

Fantasy adventure board game

- Runebound box
- Designers: Martin Wallace, Darrell Hardy
- Publishers: Fantasy Flight Games
- Years active: 2004 to present
- Players: 1–6
- Setup time: 30 minutes
- Playing time: Varies
- Chance: Dice rolling, card drawing, token flipping
- Age range: 12+
- Skills: Dice rolling, Simple arithmetic

caption=Runebound (set up)

Runebound is a high fantasy adventure board game created by Martin Wallace and Darrel Hardy and published by Fantasy Flight Games in 2004. A second edition was published in 2005. A third edition was released in 2015. In Runebound, one to six players take the roles of adventurers who seek out quests (indicated by markers on the map). The quests are then resolved with either victory for the player, or a loss of some item. Each player is seeking quests and trying to gain experience which results in greater power and combat skill.

Runebound is one of a number of fantasy games published by FFG set in the fictional world of Terrinoth including Descent: Journeys in the Dark, Rune Age, BattleLore, Dungeonquest, Runewars, and Legacy of Dragonholt, with which it shares the same heroes, artwork and some items.

The first large expansion, to Runebound, Runebound: Island of Dread, was released in 2005. Many other expansions to Runebound have been released by FFG, some are just sets of cards, others contain new maps and rule changes. Only one "large" expansion or adventure variant deck can be used at a time.

== Setting ==
The base game takes place in the realm of Terrinoth, a land covered by various terrains: plains, rivers, forests, hills, swamps, and mountains. There are 8 cities represented on the board, each with its own banner color and heraldry, including the capital city of Tamalir.

In the base scenario, "The Rise of the Dragonlords", the evil necromancer Vorakesh is trying to resurrect the High Lord of the Dragons, Margath, who was killed in the ancient Dragon Wars. In order to do so, he must gather the Dragon Runes with the help of his undead general, Sir Farrow, and their army of followers. The heroes have been charged with stopping Vorakesh's plan by either getting the Dragon Runes first, guarded by powerful dragons, or by defeating Margath himself. Along the way they will have to contend with the armies of Sir Farrow, the followers of Margath, and the monsters of the realm such as the bat-like Razorwings and ghoulish Ferrox.

== Gameplay ==
Each player assumes control over one hero of the land. The heroes each have their own unique traits including health, stamina, skills and the three primary stats of the game: Mind, Body, and Spirit. These stats are used to determine their ability to complete various challenges, such as swimming or negotiating. The stats are also used to determine their combat abilities in Ranged, Melee, and Magic phases respectively. Many heroes also have special abilities which can be used to help them in their adventures.

During the game, the heroes attempt to complete adventures of increasing difficulty, colored respectively green, yellow, blue and red. The adventures can take the form of challenges that require the hero's skill, events which affect play for all heroes, or combat with an enemy. Completing these adventures results in rewards and experience for the hero, making them more powerful based on the difficulty of the challenge.

Most adventure cards feature a battle with an enemy. Each enemy also has a skill in each of three phases: ranged combat, melee combat, and magical combat. A hero can only attack in one of these phases and must defend in the other two. However, a hero can recruit one or two allies who can attack during the other two phases of the battle.

The heroes are able to acquire gold in their adventures which can be used to purchase items that enhance their abilities such as magic swords, enchanted armor, and healing potions. As they defeat challenges, the heroes gain experience tokens which can be used to increase their starting abilities by exchanging the tokens for increased stats, stamina, or extra life. As heroes grow more powerful this allows them to tackle more difficult quests (yellow, blue, and finally red quests). Various expansion card decks change the basic game as you can gain familiars, banners, and new powers.

In the scenario included in the base game, "The Rise of the Dragonlords," the first hero to defeat Margath or complete three of the red adventure cards wins the game. Many small box expansions listed below offer variants changing the victory conditions, themes, monsters, and items available. Finishing a game can take many hours but the rules book offers some variant rules to speed up play.

== Reception ==
In a review of Runebound in Black Gate in 2011, Jeff Stehman said "There's a story running through the game that any turn of card can add to it. These can inspire." Bob Byrne also reviewed Runebound for Black Gate in 2014, and said "I think that Runebound 2nd Edition is a solid RPG board game with some useful expansions. And it comes with twelve heroes of varying abilities, so there's some replay value built in. I'd give it a try if you get a chance."

== Reviews ==
- Backstab #49

== Expansions ==
FFG has released many expansions for the game. The following is a complete list as of March 2010. This includes the following:

=== Board expansions ===
caption=Runebound: The Island of Dread

- The Island of Dread - Released in 2005. Was the first expansion released for Runebound. It features a new partial map and many new quests and treasure reward cards. It is not a stand-alone game. Most of the new map consists of sea locations with their own adventure deck.
- Midnight - Released in 2006. This is a different type of expansion in which one player takes the role of the evil Night King while the other players try to gain power such that they can beat the final host of the Night King. It is not a stand-alone game. Midnight is based on the role-playing game Midnight, a modification to Dungeons & Dragons created by FFG in 2003. This expansion is currently out of print and will most likely never see the light of day again.
- Sands of Al-Kalim - Released in 2007. It is a large expansion with a new board with an Arabian theme on which players compete to finish Story cards.
- The Frozen Wastes - Released in 2009. This expansion has an ice region as a theme and features new weather rules.
- Mists of Zanaga - Released in 2010. This expansion has a jungle theme and introduces rituals involving Primal Gods.

=== Item & Ally Card Set expansions ===
- Artifacts and Allies (2005) - This is a simple addition of more items (and allies) which the heroes can purchase from the various towns on the board. One new element added with this card set are familiars. Each hero can have one familiar in addition to the two allies. Familiars aren't very powerful but they can do useful things.
- Relics of Legend (2005) - This set of cards defines more powerful items that can be purchased by the heroes. It can be added to any Runebound game. The new items in this card set are banners, items that grant extra bonuses to your hero when you first complete a quest which charges the banner with energy.
- Champions of Kellos (2006) - This is a set of cards that define new allies and items available for purchase in the towns.
- Walkers of the Wild (2006) - New allies and item card set.
- Rituals and Runes (2008) - New allies and item card set.
- Weapons of Legend (2008) - New allies and item card set.

=== Challenge Card Set expansions ===
- The Dark Forest (2005) - Set of cards which have extra effects if played in forest hexes.
- Terrors of the Tomb (2005) - Set of cards which are all undead monster challenge quests.
- Drakes and Dragonspawn (2006) - This set of cards is designed to be added to any Runebound game. It contains more quests, and events for the heroes to conquer.
- Shadows of Margath (2006) - This set of cards is designed to be added to any Runebound game. It contains more quests, and events for the heroes to deal with. One version of this card set was created for the first version of Runebound (from 2004) but the card set was updated and reissued to be compatible with the 2nd edition rules.
- Beasts and Bandits (2008)
- Traps and Terrors (2008)

=== Adventure variants ===
- Crown of the Elder Kings (2005) - This is a deck of cards that are designed to replace many of the quest cards found in the normal game of Runebound. It creates a different story from the normal game of Runebound. This variant ends the game in a direct confrontation between players rather than battles against powerful dragons.
- The Scepter of Kyros (2005) - Another adventure deck from 2005. This variant involves invading giants.
- Avatars of Kelnov (2006) - This is a deck of cards that is designed to replace many of the quest cards found in the normal game of Runebound.
- Cult of the Rune (2006) - This is a set of 30 cards and tokens which is designed to replace many of the cards found in the normal game of Runebound. It creates a different story from the normal game of Runebound.
- The Cataclysm (2008)
- The Seven Scions (2008)

=== Character decks ===
- Battlemage (2006) - This is a set of cards for individual heroes to change their abilities. It allows you to add the powers of the Battlemage to your hero character.
- Blade Dancer (2006) - This is a set of cards for individual heroes to change their abilities. It allows you to add the powers of the Blade Dancer to your hero character.
- Runemaster (2006) - This is a set of cards for individual heroes to change their abilities. It allows you to add the powers of a Runemaster to your hero character.
- Shadow Walker (2006) - This is a set of cards for individual heroes to change their abilities. It allows you to add the powers of Shadow Walker to your hero character.
- Spiritbound (2006) - This is a set of cards for individual heroes to change their abilities. It allows you to add the powers of the Spiritbound to your hero character.
- Wildlander (2006) - This is a set of cards for individual heroes to change their abilities. It allows you to add the powers of a Wildlander to your hero character.

== All releases ==
2004

- Base game
  - Runebound (discontinued)
- Expansion deck
  - Shadows of Margath (discontinued)

2005

- Base game
  - Runebound (2nd edition)
- Expansion decks, wave 1
  - Adventure variants
    - Crown of the Elder Kings
    - The Scepter of Kyros
  - Challenge cards
    - The Dark Forest
    - Terrors of the Tomb
  - Items and ally cards
    - Artifacts and Allies
    - Relics of Legend
- Board expansion
  - The Island of Dread

2006

- Expansion decks, wave 2
  - Adventure variant
    - Avatars of Kelnov
    - Cult of the Rune
  - Challenge cards
    - Drakes and Dragonspawn
    - Shadows of Margath (2nd edition)
  - Items and ally cards
    - Champions of Kellos
    - Walkers of the Wild
- Board expansion
  - Midnight (discontinued)
- Class deck expansions
  - Battlemage
  - Blade Dancer
  - Runemaster
  - Shadow Walker
  - Spiritbound
  - Wildlander

2007

- Board expansion
  - Sands of Al-Kalim

2008

- Expansion decks, wave 3
  - Adventure variant
    - The Cataclysm
    - The Seven Scions
  - Challenge cards
    - Beasts and Bandits
    - Traps and Terrors
  - Items and ally cards
    - Rituals and Runes
    - Weapons of Legend

2009

- Board expansion
  - The Frozen Wastes

2010

- Board expansion
  - Mists of Zanaga

2015

- Base game
  - Runebound (3rd edition)

2017

- Board expansion (3rd edition)
  - Unbreakable Bonds

== Related games ==
- Descent: Journeys in the Dark
- Talisman
