= Civilization (2010 board game) =

2010 board game

Sid Meier's Civilization: The Board Game
- Civilization box cover
- Designers: Kevin Wilson
- Publishers: Fantasy Flight Games
- Publication: 2010; 16 years ago
- Players: 2-4 (2-5 with Fame and Fortune expansion)
- Playing time: 2-5 hours
- Age range: 13+
- Skills: Tactics, Strategy

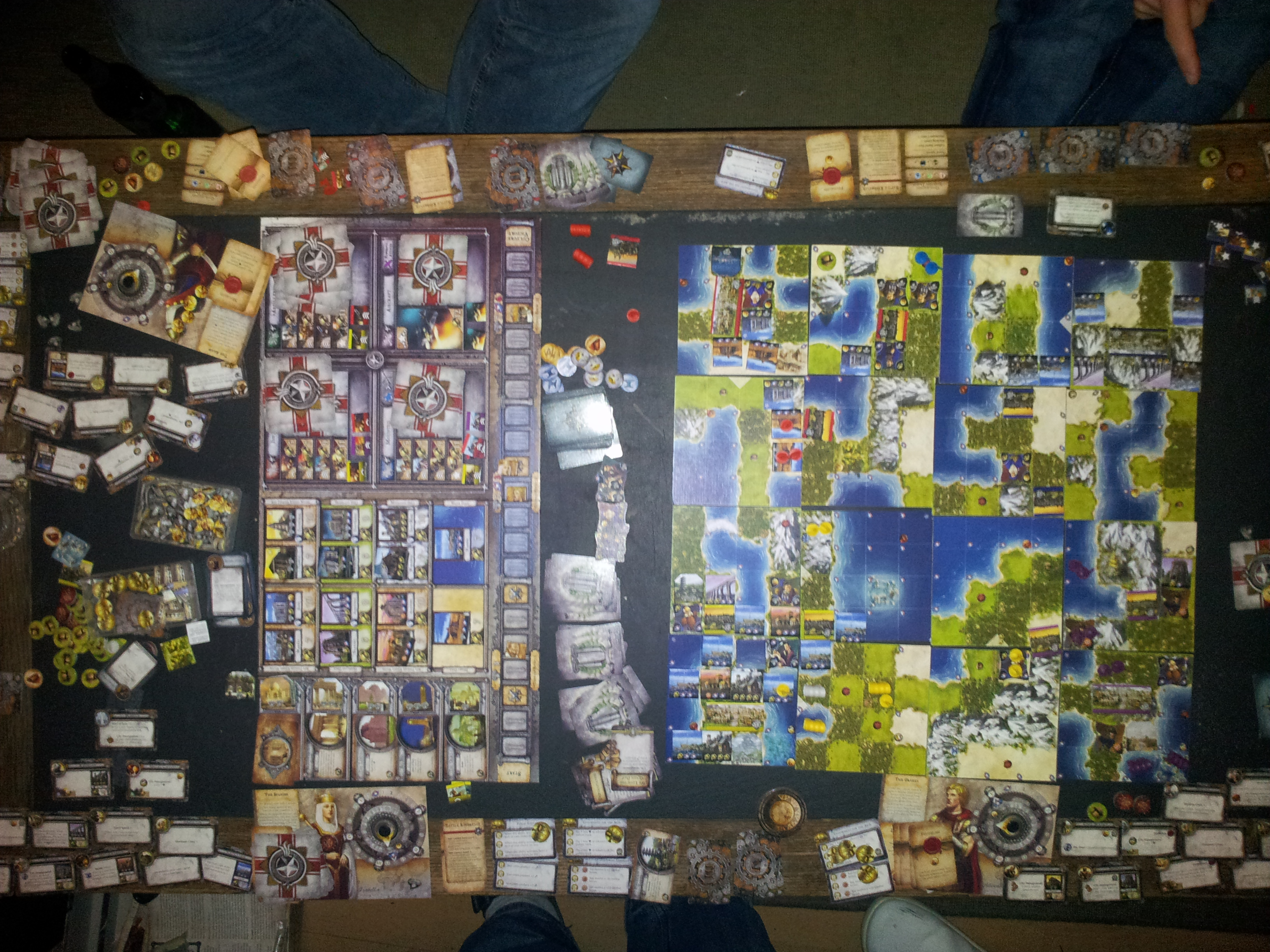
Setup of a Civilization: The Board Game including the Fame and Fortune expansion

Sid Meier's Civilization: The Board Game is a 2010 board game created by Kevin Wilson based on the Sid Meier's Civilization series of video games and published by Fantasy Flight Games. While the previous board game based on Sid Meier's Civilization, published by Eagle Games in 2002, was based on Civilization III, the 2010 version takes its primary inspiration from Civilization IV. Its expansions, Fame and Fortune and Wisdom and Warfare, also began to incorporate concepts derived from Civilization V.

== Gameplay ==
In Civilization: The Board Game, players take on one of six different civilizations (Americans, Chinese, Egyptians, Germans, Romans and Russians). The game board consists of a number of modular map tiles, which, with the exception of each civilization's unique starting map tile, are placed face-down on the board. At the start of the game, each player begins with a capital city in the centre of their own map tile, and an army and scout unit that begins in a space bordering their capital city. Each player also has a specific national power and a starting technology, depending on the civilization chosen.

Each turn in the game consists of five phases, during which players take turns performing the actions permitted in each phase:

- In the Start of Turn Phase, players may build cities, change governments, and perform start-of-turn upkeep. Players may have up to two cities (three with a technology), which are built at the present location of any of their scout units, subject to building restrictions. The tiles immediately surrounding the city is known as the "outskirts". When a technology is researched that unlocks a new form of government, players may immediately switch to the new form of government for free; in any other scenario, players must switch to the anarchy government before switching again to their desired form of government the following turn.
- In the Trade Phase, each player collects trade that is generated by their cities. The city space itself does not generate any trade; trade is only generated by the spaces that surround the spaces. Players may hold a maximum of 27 trade points at a time. Players may also negotiate on trade deals between each other during this phase. This phase is typically conducted between all players simultaneously. Trade may also be generated by scout units, and the presence of opposing army units negates trade production from a space.
- In the City Management Phase, each player may take an action for each of their cities. Each city may either produce a unit or building, gain culture points, or harvest resources. Each city may produce a figure or an unlocked unit or building costing an amount less than or equal to the number of production points in the spaces surrounding their city (hammers). Production points may not be pooled between cities, and any production points in excess of the number of points needed is lost. Like trade, scout units may also gather production for a city, and enemy units may prevent a city from accessing production points. Trade points may also be exchanged for production points. Cities devoting to the arts generate culture points rather than production, and like trade points, culture points are pooled so that they may be spent advancing a civilization's culture levels. Advancing culture levels allows players to gain culture event cards, which provide certain one-time bonuses, or Great People, which act as improved versions of buildings that may be moved between cities. Cities harvesting resources gain the resource that they harvest, which may then be spent on resource-based abilities granted by technologies. As with other forms of production, scouts may harvest on behalf of a city, and the harvesting of resources may be blockaded by enemy units.
- In the Movement Phase, players may move their armies and scouts a number of spaces on the board. The number of spaces that may be travelled is based on the technologies the players have researched. Movement may be constrained by the presence of water, depending on the technologies researched, and there is a limit on the number of units that may occupy a single space on the board. Units may also move onto a face-down map tile, turning it face up. Certain spaces on the map contain huts and villages, which represent passive and aggressive barbarians, which grant resources on discovery. Players may also engage in military conflicts with another player during this phase, with the winner of the battle being able to take assets belonging to the loser as a reward.
- In the Research Phase, players may spend trade points to research new technologies. This phase is performed simultaneously by all players. Each technology is organized into a number of ages, and technology research is governed by the "tech pyramid": new "Age I" technologies may be researched at any time, and the number of advanced technologies that the player may have at any given time is always one less than the number of technologies of the previous age that has been researched. Researching a technology of a particular age requires that the player has a minimum number of trade points, all of which are spent upon performing the research. Players with coins, gained from buildings or technologies, may retain some trade when discovering new technologies over the course of the game.

The game ends if a player reaches the last culture level, possesses 15 coins, researches a technology in the fifth level of the technology pyramid, or conquers the capital city of another player.

- To get a Culture Win, players need to dedicate their cities to art and build wonders, which generate culture tokens. When the player acquires a pre-determined number of tokens, he may advance in the culture path, gaining bonus as culture event cards and great people tokens along the way. The culture event cards has many different effects, ranging from killing enemy figures to collecting resources for free. The great people token is applied to one of the city's outskirt square, generating new better effects. When the player reaches the last culture level, he wins the game.
- To get an Economy Win, players need to gather 15 coins. The coins are acquired by gathering the resource on the map, discovering it on huts and villages, or performing tasks assigned on technology researched. For example, a technology researched may have a bonus effect that awards the player one coin for every combat victory, up to 4 coins total.
- To get a Technology Win, players need to research the last and the only fifth level technology in the game, "Space Flight". Ruled by the tech tree, the player needs a minimum of 15 techs researched to win the game this way. Players exchange a number of trade for a tech, and the higher the tech level, the higher the trade cost. Techs have many different effects, unlocking government types, upgraded units and buildings and so on.
- To get a Military Win, players need to conquer the capital city of any other player. The player can do this by moving his army to another player's capital, after which the combat starts. Each player draws randomly his maximum number of units (controlled by the maximum unit hand size, which varies). The defending city usually has a bigger default bonus than the attacking army, so the attacking army must be prepared to win the battles. Defense starting first, players alternate their units in combat, until all cards have been played. At the end of battle, both players calculate their combat bonus and the player with the higher bonus wins the battle. If the player that attacked the city wins, the game is over and that player wins the game.

== Fame and Fortune ==
In November 2011, Fantasy Flight Games released an expansion to Civilization: The Board Game titled Fame and Fortune. This expansion adds four new civilizations to the game (Arabs, Greeks, Indians and Spanish), as well as rule revisions, new map tiles that depict relics, which grant one-time bonuses for the first player to move an army to its space. The game also adds the parts necessary for a fifth player. Several new optional game mechanics have also been introduced to the game:

- Players may voluntarily remove armies and scouts from the board to form a fortress or trade caravan, respectively. Fortresses give cities a one-time bonus in defending against armies, while caravans produce a one-time production point bonus.
- A new technology permits players to expand their capital city into a metropolis. Metropolises take up two spaces instead of one, and may be expanded into water. Metropolises also gain a token defensive bonus over regular cities, gain more culture when devoted to the arts and generally produce more resources due to there being 10 spaces around the metropolis compared to 8 around the city.
- A new "Great Person" deck allows players to recruit Great Persons of a specific type rather than drawing Great Persons at random. The powers granted by Great Persons are also greatly expanded by the deck.
- A new "Investment" deck allows players to invest their accumulated coins in one of four main investments. These coins no longer count towards the 15 coins needed to win the game, but coins invested grant additional bonuses to players.

== Wisdom and Warfare ==
A second expansion entitled Wisdom and Warfare was released in August 2013. This expansion introduces six new civilizations to the game (Aztecs, English, French, Japanese, Mongols and Zulu). Unlike the previous expansion, the player limit isn't raised: the game remains a 2-4 player game (or 2-5 players if both expansions are in play).

The expansion also includes new optional features and revisions:

- Players choose up to 3 social policies, from 8 different options found on 4 double-sided social policy cards. This means each policy has a mutually-exclusive opposite, for example "Pacifism" and "Military Tradition" cannot both be chosen simultaneously. The number of social policies is the same number of cities and the social policies add benefits for each victory path, so the player may reinforce one aspect or use the social policy to compensate for a sub-developed aspect of their civilization.
- New technologies for every tree level, giving more options to the player. New, more balanced wonders for every level. New map tiles, some very different from the base game and the first expansion, also including 2 new relics. New huts and villages, with the addition of the concept of city state, which is a powerful square that counts as an outskirt of a city while the player has a figure on it. A new construction is available, shipyard, which is built over water and also gives combat bonuses.
- All 55 unit cards were replaced for new, more complex ones. Now, every card has two attributes: power and strength, working as attack and defense. Every card has a sum of power and strength equal to four, so a card may be 3/1, 2/2 or 1/3. It is possible now to have a unit enter combat with another unit and both end the combat alive. Also, at the end of combat, wounds aren't healed and only strength minus wounds (aside of other combat bonus) are counted to declare the winner. These changes made combat much more complex, and luck was reduced as every card has the same total points.
- All government cards were replaced. Now, every government gives the player a bonus, even despotism. All government cards were given a boost to its power, so now it is much more desirable to change governments during a game.
- The expansion introduced a fifth possible action for a city. Now every city may start a "building program". Essentially, the city loses its action this turn, and next turn the same city has the double number of production points. This allows for a greater number of wonders in the game, as well as allow small cities with low production to build a much needed construction.

== Reception ==
The game was well received, having an aggregated score of 7.8 out of 10 on Board Game Geek. Most reviews on the site praise the gameplay and the conversion of the PC game to table.

The Fame and Fortune expansion was even better received, with an aggregated score of 8.7 out of 10 on Board Game Geek. Most reviews praise the better distribution in reaching each winning path over the core game. The changes in the way great people are added to each player were also well received, making the culture path more desirable, and so were the relics giving a one time bonus, as the new feature also encouraged more exploring.

The Wisdom and Warfare expansion was also very well received, even though it was released 2 years after the first expansion and 3 years after the base game, having an aggregated score of 8.6 out of 10 on Board Game Geek. Most reviews praise the new civilizations, with interesting powers. The changes in combat were also well received, as it felt too random and unfair prior to the expansion.

== See also ==
- Civilization: A New Dawn, a 2017 board game also published by Fantasy Flight Games based on the Civilization series.
