= Doom: The Boardgame =

Board game based on Doom Series

Doom: The Board Game
- Cover for Doom: The Boardgame from Doom 3
- Publishers: Id Software Bethesda Softworks
- Publication: 2004; 22 years ago
- Genres: Dark Fantasy Dungeon

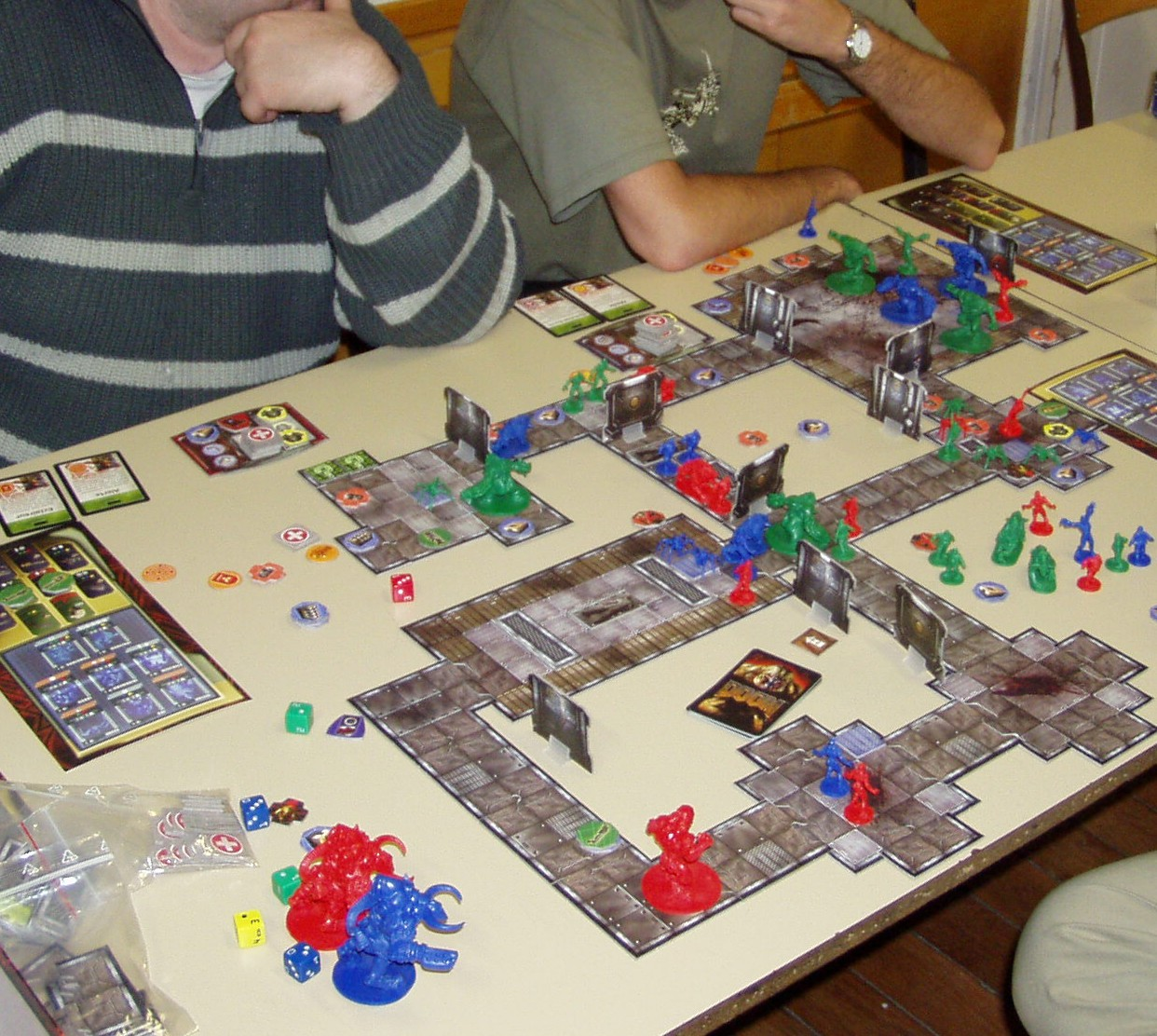
A game in progress

Cover for Doom: The Boardgame Expansion Set

Doom: The Boardgame is an adventure board game for two to four players (two to five in the 2016 edition) designed by Kevin Wilson and published by Fantasy Flight Games in 2004. The game is based on the Doom series of first-person shooter computer games, though it resembles Doom 3 more than it does the first four Doom video games.

An expansion was released for the game in 2005, called Doom: The Boardgame Expansion Set, which adds difficulty levels to the game, new game pieces and updates to some of the original rules, as well rules to play on Deathmatch and Capture the Flag.

In 2005, Fantasy Flight released Descent: Journeys in the Dark, which is based on the Doom game. Soon after this, the company ceased production of Doom.

An updated version was released by Fantasy Flight in 2016, resembling the newly released DOOM.

== Gameplay ==
Players in Doom: The Boardgame are on one of two teams: the Invaders, and the Marines. All of the Invader pieces are controlled by one player, and the rest of the players each control one marine piece. Before each game begins, the players must choose a scenario to play in. A campaign consisting of five scenarios is included with the game, and many more have been created using freeware scenario editors. The player controlling the Invaders must get six frags to win, whereas the Marines must reach the exit to win. A "frag" is given to the Invaders if a Marine dies. When a Marine dies, it must respawn between eight and sixteen spaces from where it was killed. A common opinion is that the game is biased in favor of the Invaders - especially with four players. The designer of the game, Kevin Wilson, claims that he can win equally well no matter which team he is playing. Like many board games, it is common to develop house rules (called "mods" to fit the video game theme) to balance the game to players' liking.

== Reception ==
Doom: The Boardgame was the number one-selling board game in 2004.

== Reviews ==
- Pyramid
- Rue Morgue #45
