= Virtual (role-playing game) =

Virtual is a 2003 role-playing game published by Fantasy Flight Games.

== Gameplay ==
Virtual is a game in which player characters are newly awakened sentient programs.

== Publication history ==
Shannon Appelcline noted that "FFG's last major d20 line was Horizon, which was a set of standalone 'minigames'. There were five and all, and like Dragonstar they covered non-standard settings: the post-apocalyptic Redline (2003), the fairy-tale-based Grimm (2003), the cyberpunk Virtual (2003), the weird west Spellslinger (2004) and the giant-robot world of Mechamorphosis (2004)."

== Reviews ==
- Pyramid
- Backstab
