= Fallout: The Board Game =

Narrative-based adventure board game

- Designers: Andrew Fischer; Nathan I. Hajek
- Publishers: Fantasy Flight Games
- Publication: 2017
- Players: 1-4
- Playing time: 120-180 minutes

Fallout: The Board Game is a narrative-based adventure board game published by Fantasy Flight Games. Originally released in 2017, the game is set in the fictional universe established in the Fallout video game series. It was designed by Andrew Fischer and Nathan I. Hajek.

== Gameplay ==
In Fallout: The Board Game, players take on the roles of survivors in a post-apocalyptic world, exploring the ruins of civilization and interacting with various factions, creatures, and characters from the Fallout fictional universe. The game can be played with 1–4 players, and typically takes between 2–3 hours to complete.

The game is played on a hex board that creates various configurations based on the Fallout 3 and Fallout 4 video games. Players select a character to explore the wasteland and complete various quests, from which players gain points. Quests are generated by pulling cards from a deck of more than 150 quest and encounter cards when players visit certain locations. Throughout the game, players must combat various enemies, interact with various factions, and collect equipment. Characters level up by gaining experience points using Fallout's S.P.E.C.I.A.L. system.

== Expansions ==
In 2018, Fantasy Flight Games released the first expansion based on the original Fallout and Fallout 2 video games, Fallout: New California. The expansion contains new scenarios, characters, map tiles, loot cards, and a co-op scenario. A second expansion, Fallout: Atomic Bonds, was released in 2020 and added co-op for all the existing competitive scenarios and several gameplay modifications. These include a way to fast travel, an assist die and mechanic for combat, workshop upgrades, item modifications, and player mutations.

== Reception ==
Kotaku applauded Fallout: The Board Game's quest, exploration, and storytelling systems. Ars Technica said players "will immediately be hooked on the choose-your-own-adventure plot", but critiqued the story arc for "never quite reach[ing] a climax". Polygon called Fallout: The Board Game a "surprisingly excellent board game adaptation".
