= Descent: Journeys in the Dark =

2005 board game

- The box for the game's First Edition
- Manufacturers: Fantasy Flight Games
- Designers: Jesper Ejsing, John Goodenough, Frank Walls
- Players: 2-5
- Setup time: < 30 minutes
- Playing time: 2 to 4 hours
- Chance: some

Descent: Journeys in the Dark is a two to five player high fantasy dungeon crawl published by Fantasy Flight Games in 2005. Descent was designed and produced by Kevin Wilson. The game is based on an improved version of the mechanics of FFG's licensed Doom: The Boardgame. In Descent, players take the roles of adventurers who delve into underground complexes in search of treasure (the so-called "dungeon crawl"). One player takes the role of the Overlord, who controls the enemies and plays cards to hinder the hero players. Descent differs from other games in the genre in that the Overlord player's goal is to win by exhausting the other players of victory points, rather than merely to facilitate play. The Overlord's resources are limited by the rules of the game, which require them to hoard and expend "threat" points, which are generated in response to the hero players' actions, in order to hamper the other players and to bring out additional monsters to defeat them. This mechanism is very much reminiscent of The Lord of the Rings when playing with the Sauron optional expansion.

Descent is one of a number of fantasy board games published by FFG, others include Runebound and licensed Warcraft III, World of Warcraft and several The Lord of the Rings games. Descent shares the same characters with Runebound and its expansion set as well as Runewars and the card game Rune Age. The first expansion, Descent: Well of Darkness, was released on October 26, 2006. A second expansion Descent: Altar of Despair was released February 2007 and a third expansion, Descent: Road to Legend which includes campaign rules, was released in March 2008. A fourth expansion, Descent: Tomb of Ice is also available, providing additional features. Finally, the Sea of Blood expansion creates another campaign world.

In October 2006, Board Games Online announced that they were working on an online PC version of Descent: Journeys in the Dark for their BattlePawn 3D boardgame engine. Descent was to be BattlePawn's launch title, but development on this product was terminated on 13 June 2008 following creative differences with Fantasy Flight Games.

In 2012, FFG released a redesigned second edition of the game. The redesign was primarily designed to reduce the time required for each game session. It is not compatible with the first edition; however, a conversion kit is available to bring monsters and heroes of the first edition to the second.

In November 2019, Aconyte Books, a publishing company launched by Asmodee Entertainment, announced that they will release a set of novels based on some of Asmodee Entertainment games, including Descent: Journeys in the dark. The novel, Descent–Journeys in the Dark: The Doom of Fallowhearth, was released in 2020.

== Gameplay ==
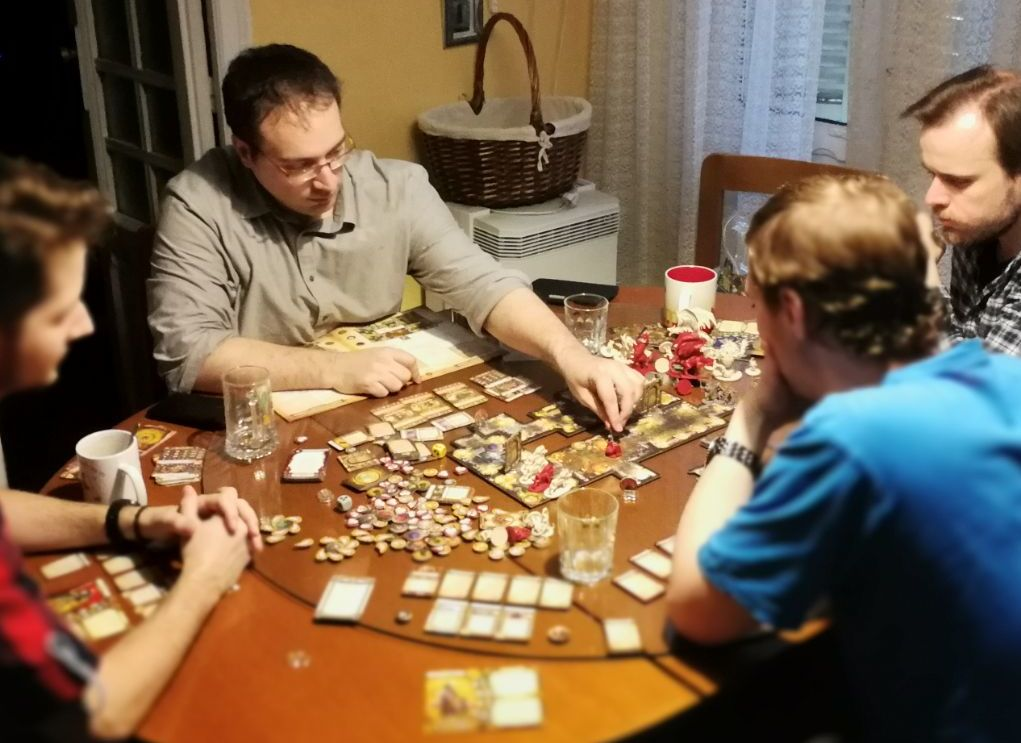
Players with the Descent board game

There are two sides, the "hero side" and the "Overlord". The heroes are attempting to complete a quest (usually kill a boss monster at the end of a set of rooms). The Overlord attempts to stop the heroes by playing traps or spawning monsters who can then be used to attack the heroes.

Each quest features a different map (a configuration of tiles). The arrangement of tiles and placement of various traps, special events, and treasures gives Descent a great deal of flexibility in comparison to many other board games. However, the players must spend somewhat more time to set up the game before it can be played.

The heroes are able to use a number of items which enhance their abilities such as magic swords, enchanted armor, healing potions, and much more. They also have a number of abilities which make them stronger and more effective than the majority of the monsters which the Overlord can summon. As the heroes find more treasure, they grow more powerful and this allows them to tackle more difficult quests. Even so, heroes are expected to die during their quest, but can be restored to life indefinitely. They merely concede some victory points in the process.

Heroes are represented as a set of cards and tokens. A primary character card identifies the character, provides initial statistics, and indicates special abilities. An additional set of three or more cards indicate special skills. A campaign game makes heroes start well below this level (one special skill instead of three) and end well above. Further cards indicate equipment carried and equipped. Tokens indicate health, stamina, potions, and statistic enhancements. Specialized tokens indicate which heroes have taken actions, indicate special preparations a character has taken, and indicate negative status effects like being poisoned.

The game features many different dice, while they are all six-sided, they contain a number of symbols (sometimes three on a single face). The different dice have different purposes (one die generally produces damage, another die generally produces range). The most powerful weapons in the game can result in the heroes rolling ten dice for a single attack, though normally heroes only roll three to five.

Game play is listed as between four and five hours to play a single quest. A total of nine quests were defined in the original game. Many more quests have been created and officially posted on the FFG website.

== Expansions ==
Since its initial release, a number of official expansions have been published. The expansions add additional quests, as well as additional options for players.

Year	Description
2006	The Well of Darkness The Well of Darkness was the first expansion released for the Descent game. The expansion provides new tiles, new heroes, and new monsters. It also adds more options and power for the Overlord. With the expansion, the Overlord player can modify his deck of cards (potential actions in the game) to include some number of more powerful traps, summoned monsters, and events. Treachery points allow the overlord to customize his/her overlord deck with specific cards of their choice. This allows the overlord to combat specific tactics or add in challenges that synergize with the current quest. The Well of Darkness contains nine new fully defined quests. Like the first game, the expansion features heroes who are also found in the board game Runebound.
2007	The Altar of Despair The Altar of Despair is the second expansion for the Descent game, released in January 2007. It offers 6 new heroes, 5 new types of monsters (such as Dark Priests and tentacled Chaos Beasts), new traps (such as crushing walls), and new quests. New terrain consists of corrupted dungeon terrain. Some minor rules and changes are also made to accommodate a new action type (prolonged actions) used in the new quests.
2008	The Road to Legend The Road to Legend is another expansion for the Descent game, released in March 2008 in the US. It is the first 'plastic-less' expansion, featuring no new miniatures but instead focusing on new campaign rules and new world stories allowing for a group of Descent adventurers to grow and develop over long-term play across several sessions. Alongside the campaign rules, there are new props and obstacles such as boneheaps, nourishing fountains, and sheltering trees. It also provides many new tile pieces and new outdoor tiles. There are new rules for leveling monsters and adventurers up to silver, gold, and diamond versions for added challenge, as well as new Overlord lieutenants and avatars to allow the forces of good to come face-to-face with the evil player's character.
2008	The Tomb of Ice The Tomb of Ice is the fourth expansion for Descent: Journeys in the Dark. Included are new plastic figures representing spectral shades, volcanic lava beetles, petrifying medusas, stealthy wendigos, and gigantic ice wyrms as well as six new heroes which are partially very distinct from the previous ones. It also introduces a new die which is used for the new invisibility ability and the so-called Feat cards which allow the heroes to perform special actions or add an extra bonus. The players' Feat cards are unknown to the Overlord and, thus, provide an element of surprise counterbalancing the Overlord's card hand.
2009	The Sea of Blood The Sea of Blood is the fifth Descent expansion, and the second 'plastic-less' expansion focusing on the rules for the campaign game, and not new miniatures. It was announced at Gen Con 2009, and officially released shortly before Christmas 2009. It provides a refined set of the Road To Legend campaign rules, alongside a completely new island based campaign setting for Descent campaigns, and several new other cards, such as treasure, to enhance the basic game. The expansion has a decidedly nautical theme, with the game gaining new mechanics allowing the party to look after and use a ship in the new setting. It contains the complete rules required to expand the basic game into the campaign game, and FFG states the game is fully compatible with all previous expansions except Road to Legend.

=== Single miniature expansions ===
Since the release of Road to Legend, Fantasy Flight has also released a number of single-figure expansions. These each provide a single detailed metal miniature to represent one of the Overlord's lieutenants, originally introduced, and represented, in that expansion as counters.

There are currently 15 of these small expansions, with 10 representing the evil characters introduced in Road to Legend, and 5 representing those from Sea of Blood

== Second Edition ==
In 2012 Fantasy Flight Games released a streamlined version Descent: Journeys in the Dark Second Edition. Along with the second edition a conversion kit was released, allowing players to use first edition monsters and heroes in the second edition game. Since then, several expansions plus hero, monster and lieutenant packs have been released for the second edition, which add quests, campaigns, secret rooms and additional overlord rules to the base game. The original first edition has been discontinued and replaced by the second edition.

== Reception ==
The first edition of the board game was nominated for 2006 Golden Geek Best Gamer's Board Game and the second edition, six years later, was nominated for 2012 Golden Geek Best Thematic Board Game

Alan R. Moon comments: "If you want something simpler than Descent, or want to start with a more basic dungeon-crawl game, TSR's old Dungeon board game, isn't bad at all. In fact, it had been my favorite dungeon-crawl for over 30 years, until Descent came along. But my bet is that once you play Descent, you won't want to play any other dungeon-crawl game again." Board Games Land have referred to is as "one of the best dungeon crawl classics out there" and Quintin Smith from Shut Up & Sit Down said that "for all that gaming has evolved D&D since it first came out, there's nothing better than that".

Other reviews:

- Rebel Times #7
  - Rebel Times #9 (Well of Darkness expansion)
  - Rebel Times #13 (The Altar of Despair expansion)

== Related Games ==
Descent borrowed and expanded mechanics from Doom: The Boardgame, released in late 2004. It also borrows from "Space Hulk", released in 1989.

Descent is set in Terrinoth, the same fantasy universe as Runebound, Runewars and Rune Age, as well as the new edition of BattleLore. For a time Dungeonquest was set in the world of Terrinoth as well, however, though still keeping the names of characters and types of monsters, FFG removed all references to Terrinoth as of the latest revised edition of the game, released in 2014.

In 2014 Fantasy Flight Games released Imperial Assault, a board game based in the Star Wars universe using a similar ruleset to Descent.

HeroQuest could be considered the grandfather of Descent, with characters assigned to the players, and equipment purchased before descending into a dungeon region to solve quests. Descent prevents the 'stalling' tactics players were capable of in HeroQuest – the deck the Overlord uses in Descent acts as a timer, so every action taken by the heroes comes at a price.
