= Elder Sign (card game) =

Tabletop game

- Elder Sign during play
- Years active: 2011 - Present
- Genres: Cooperative dice resolution
- Players: 1 - 8
- Setup time: 5 - 10 minutes
- Playing time: 1 - 2 hours
- Chance: Medium
- Skills: cooperative gaming

Elder Sign is a cooperative card and dice game, based on the Cthulhu Mythos of horror writer H.P. Lovecraft and Chaosium's Call of Cthulhu roleplaying game. It is published by Fantasy Flight Games, which also produces the Cthulhu Mythos games Arkham Horror, Call of Cthulhu: The Card Game, Mansions of Madness, and Eldritch Horror.

== Play ==
- Players randomly select a monster (known as an Ancient One) to oppose. The Ancient One requires a certain number of elder sign tokens to "seal" or imprison it. Conversely, the Ancient One can be "awakened" or released by a number of doom tokens. There are also many other less powerful monsters that can appear during the game.
- Each player chooses an investigator to play as (usually randomly), each investigator having unique abilities.
- Players take turns exploring a randomly generated room (there are Adventure cards and Other World cards). If a player succeeds at completing all of the tasks in the room they are exploring, they obtain a reward. Conversely, if they fail, they receive a penalty. If the player's investigator is devoured (either by losing all of their stamina and/or sanity), they lose what they originally had, a doom token is added to the doom track, and the player returns to play as a different investigator.
- Rooms are explored until either the Ancient One is "sealed" or "awakened". If the Ancient One is sealed, the players immediately win. If the Ancient One awakens, the players must face it in battle. This battle is designed to be extremely difficult with a low chance of success, so players must try to prevent the Ancient One from awakening at all costs.

== Reception ==
Giaco Furino of Fearnet wrote, "If you're a Cthulhu fan this game is a must." Michael Harrison of Wired.com called it "a fun, thrilling dice game".

== Reviews ==
- Rue Morgue #153

== Expansions ==
In June 2013, an expansion called Unseen Forces was released. It introduced the Blessed/Cursed mechanic. Two new dice were added - a player uses the white die when they are Blessed and the black die when they are Cursed. The Blessed die has the same sides as a green die and its result can be used to help complete adventure card tasks. The Cursed die also has the same sides as a green die but instead of using its result to aid you, if it matches the result of another die that was rolled, both dice are removed for the remainder of the adventure, making it harder to complete it. The expansion also added many new cards to the game, including optional Master Mythos cards that can be used to increase the difficulty of the game.

In February 2015, a second expansion called Gates of Arkham was released. It introduced a new game mode called 'Streets of Arkham' which completely changes the way the game is played. Instead of always having adventure cards face up, they are face down, adding a completely new unknown element to the game. There are ways to flip cards over, but typically, each player explores the streets of Arkham at their own risk, not knowing what tasks will be required to complete an adventure until the player has already committed to it. This, along with other elements, such as gate openings, make the game significantly more difficult than the normal game mode.

In March 2016, a third expansion called Omens of Ice was released. Instead of the museum or the streets of Arkham, the action takes place in Alaska. Players must gather supplies and deal with increasingly bad weather along with new monsters and Ancient Ones. Omens also adds new investigators and item cards to aid players in this multi-staged Alaskan adventure.

In April 2016, a small, print-on-demand expansion called Grave Consequences was released. This modular expansion features three new decks which increase narrative elements of the gameplay while adding difficulty. Phobia cards put limitations on investigators' choices, Epitaph cards provide boons to the surviving investigators when one of their own is devoured, and Epic Battle cards change the way the final battle with the Ancient One is played.

In February 2017, the fifth expansion (or fourth "boxed" expansion) called Omens of the Deep was released. This expansion brings the action to the Pacific aboard The Ultima Thule and introduces a new two-stage R’lyeh Rising mode of gameplay where players must first navigate the Dark Waters track and then assemble the Amulet of R’lyeh to win the game. It also introduces two new kinds of monster tokens called Deep One Legion and Missions that have their own special rules and rewards. A new Pacific Adventure deck and Mythos deck replace the base game decks while new investigator, skills, items, spells and ally cards expand the existing decks. The adventure cards in this expansion retain the format and gameplay introduced in the Gates of Arkham expansion where they are placed face down and only revealed when an investigator moves to one.

In March 2018, the fifth "boxed" expansion for Elder Sign, called Omens of the Pharaoh, was released.
