= Percevan =

- Poster of the Barsac 2015 comics festival showing Percevan, Kervin and Guimly
- Created by: Jean Léturgie; Philippe Luguy

Publication information
- Publisher: Gomme ! (prepublication); Glénat; Dargaud; Akiléos; Halyotis Editions; Fantasy Flight (in english)
Title(s)
- 1. Les Trois Étoiles d'Ingaar (1982)
- 2. Le Tombeau des Glaces (1983)
- 3. L'Épée de Ganaël (1984)
- 4. Le Pays d'Aslor (1985)
- 5. Le Sablier d'El Jerada (1986)
- 6. Les Clefs de Feu (1988)
- 7. Les Seigneurs de l'Enfer (1992)
- 8. La Table d'Émeraude (1995)
- 9. L'Arcantane Noire (1996)
- 10. Le Maître des Étoiles (1998)
- 11. Les Sceaux de l'Apocalypse (2001)
- 12. Le Septième Sceau (2004)
- 13. Les Terres sans Retour (2010)
- 14. Les Marches d'Eliandysse (2011)
- 15. Le Huitième Royaume (2013)
- 16. La Couronne du Crépuscule (2016)
- Formats: Original material for the series has been published as a set of graphic novels.
- Original language: French
- Genre: Action/adventure
- Publication date: 1981 – Present
- Main character(s): Percevan; Kervin; Guimly; Balkis; Altaïs; Shyloc'h; Sharlaan; Mortepierre; Polémic; Ciensinfus

Creative team
- Writer(s): Jean Léturgie; Xavier Fauche
- Artist(s): Philippe Luguy

Percevan is a French comic series drawn by Philippe Luguy, and written by Jean Léturgie and Xavier Fauche, first pre-published in the French comic magazine Gomme ! in 1981. The adventures take place in a medieval world where magic plays an important part. The series is more mature and darker than one might think at first sight in view of the cartoony drawings of Luguy.

== Characters ==
- Percevan : The hero. He is a knight who has traces of magic in him since "Shaarlan" entered his body.
- Kervin : A troubadour, a baladin, and Percevan's best friend. Very round, he is permanently famished.
- Guimly : little animal of the simlusnanus species.
- Balkis : Witch, after meeting Percevan she gives up black magic.
- Altaïs : Witch, sister of Balkis.
- Shyloc'h : Repulsive character and Balkis's Servant.
- Sharlaan : Wizard
- Mortepierre : Baron. Power and Wealth are the only things he desires.
- Polémic : Mortepierre's Servant.
- Ciensinfus : Evil wizard.

== Title List ==
=== Original Titles ===
Original albums as published by Dargaud:

- 1. Les Trois Étoiles d'Ingaar (1982)
- 2. Le Tombeau des Glaces (1983)
- 3. L'Épée de Ganaël (1984)
- 4. Le Pays d'Aslor (1985)
- 5. Le Sablier d'El Jerada (1986)
- 6. Les Clefs de Feu (1988)
- 7. Les Seigneurs de l'Enfer (1992)
- 8. La Table d'Émeraude (1995)
- 9. L'Arcantane Noire (1996)
- 10. Le Maître des Étoiles (1998)
- 11. Les Sceaux de l'Apocalypse (2001)
- 12. Le Septième Sceau (2004)
- 13. Les Terres sans Retour (2010)
- 14. Les Marches d'Eliandysse (2011)
- 15. Le Huitième Royaume (2013)
- 16. La Couronne du Crépuscule (2016)

=== English translations ===
Fantasy Flight has published four volumes in English, each volume collecting three original albums.

Legends of Percevan, Volume 1: The Stars of Ingaar — 2009; ISBN 978-1-58994-366-7
Legends of Percevan, Volume 2: The Realm of Aslor — 2009; ISBN 978-1-58994-422-0
Legends of Percevan, Volume 3: The Shadow of Malicorne — 2010; ISBN 978-1-58994-423-7
Legends of Percevan, Volume 4: The Seven Seals — 2010; ISBN 978-1-58994-504-3
