= Hey, That's My Fish! =

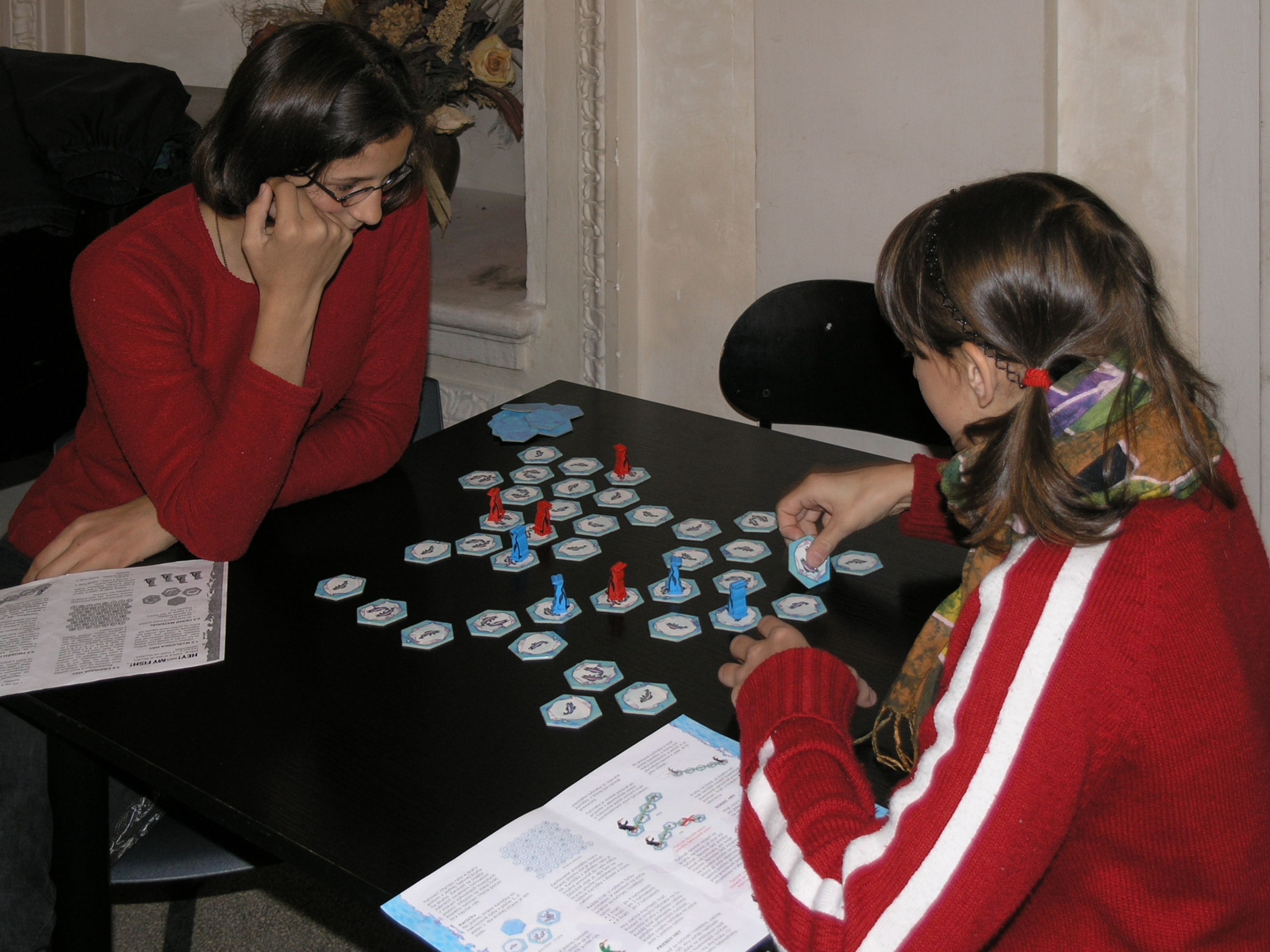
A two-player game of Hey, That's My Fish! in progress.

Hey, That's My Fish! is a 2003 board game designed by Günter Cornett and Alveydas Jakeliunas. The game is for two to four players and is produced by American game company Fantasy Flight Games.

== Rules ==
The game is about penguins trying to catch fish on the Antarctic. The game board is made of connected hexagons, each with one, two or three fish. After the game board has been built, each player chooses a colour and is assigned a number of penguins: four for a two-player game, three for a three-player game, or two for a four-player game. These penguins are then placed onto any vacant hexagon containing one fish.

On each player's turn, the player moves one of his/her penguins in a straight line as far as he/she wishes, as long as there is a continuous line of vacant hexagons between the penguin's starting and destination hexagons. Penguins can't jump over empty space or other penguins. The hexagon that the penguin started from is then removed from play, becoming the player's property.

A penguin that can't move anywhere is removed from play, along with the hexagon it is standing on. Also, any completely isolated areas that don't have any penguins on them are removed from play.

When none of the penguins are in play any more, the game ends. The player who has collected the most fish from his/her hexagons wins.

== Reviews ==
- Family Games: The 100 Best
- Rebel Times #12
