= Chaos in the Old World =

2009 board game

Chaos in the Old World is a 2009 board game published by Fantasy Flight Games.

== Gameplay ==
Chaos in the Old World is a game in which players become rival chaos gods—each with unique powers, followers, and sinister strategies—warring through corruption, conquest, and summoned horrors to reshape the Old World while battling both one another and its desperate defenders.

== Reviews ==
- Black Gate
- Rebel Times #27
- Świata Gier Planszowych #25 (as "Chaos w Starym Świecie")
