= Aye, Dark Overlord! =

Card game

- Designers: Fabrizio Bonifacio; Massimiliano Enrico
- Players: 4–6
- Setup time: 1 minute
- Playing time: 25 minutes
- Skills: Diplomacy

Aye, Dark Overlord! (Italian: Sì, Oscuro Signore!) is a storytelling card game designed by Fabrizio Bonifacio and Massimiliano Enrico. Riccardo Crosa illustrated the cards for the public release. This game won the award as the best card game in Lucca Comics and Games 2005.

Each player is a goblin servant of the evil Dark Overlord Rigor Mortis ("the Master of all Evils"), and must try to avoid punishment when an evil mission fails.

== Gameplay ==
The game begins when all epic tales end, that is when the good guys won and the evil servants go back to their palace defeated. How will they face the wrath of the Dark Overlord in front of their clear failure? In the game, one player will act as Rigor Mortis, the Dark Overlord, while the others will be his inept servants, back to the palace without having accomplished their mission; to save themselves, they will try to justify themselves, blaming the others, until the Dark Overlord decides whom to punish.
