= Eldritch Horror =

Board game

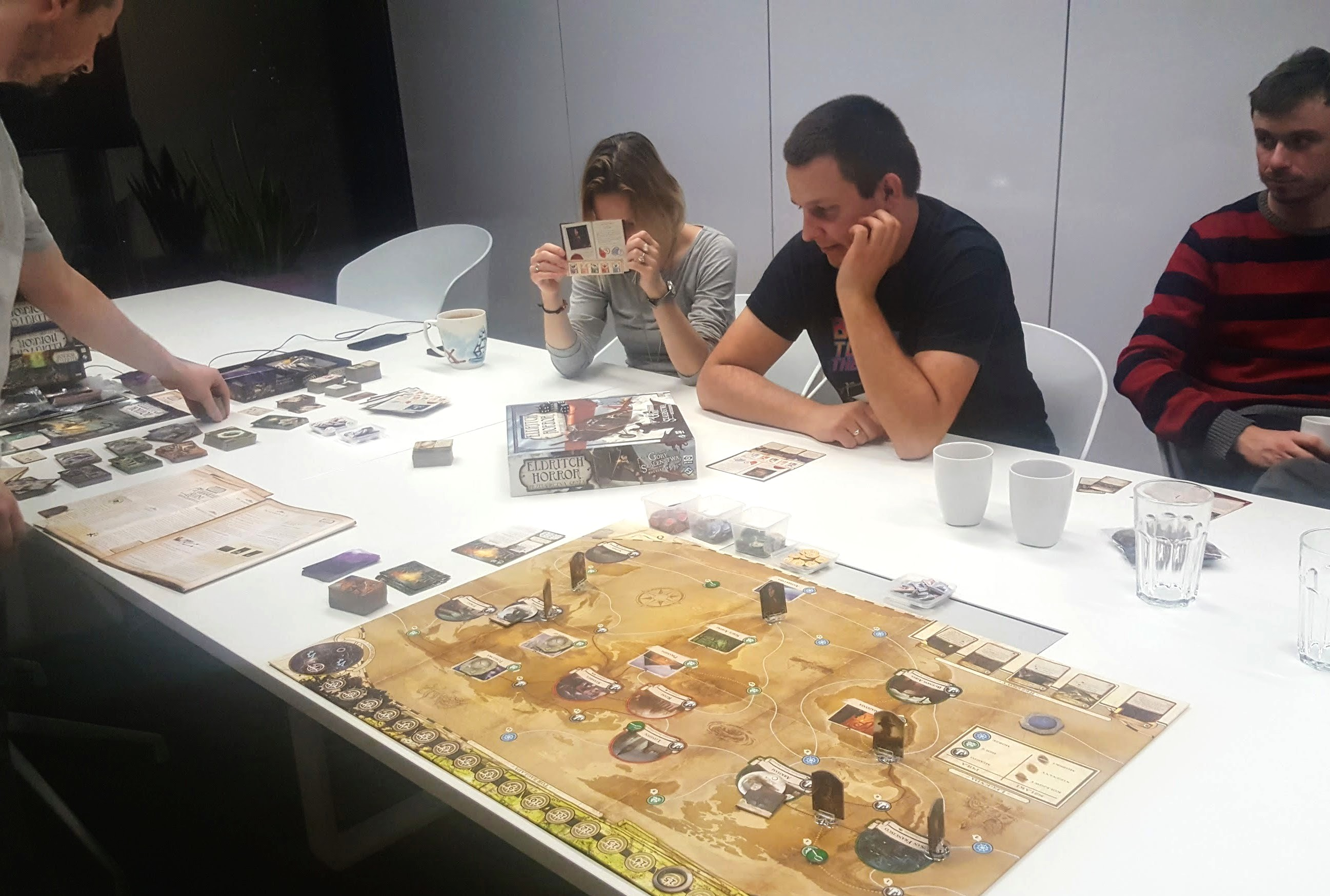
- Gamers playing Eldritch Horror board game, Poland 2017
- Publishers: Fantasy Flight Games
- Genres: Board game, Cthulhu Mythos, survival horror
- Players: 1 to 8
- Chance: Medium
- Age range: 14 and up
- Skills: Problem solving, cooperative gaming

Eldritch Horror is a tabletop strategy board game published by Fantasy Flight Games in 2013. The players explore locales around the world filled with Cthulhu Mythos horrors.

== Gameplay ==
Players cooperatively fight an ancient evil stirring from its slumber and must seal off this awakening horror before it is too late. Players travel around the globe battling monsters, solving mysteries, and equipping up, all to prevent the Ancient One from entering the world and threatening to destroy it.

Each round of the game is divided into three sections: the action phase (where each player takes actions for their character), the encounter phase (where players may draw encounter cards and interact with the world around them), and the mythos phase (where the Ancient One and his minions get an opportunity to act out their nefarious deeds).

== Expansions ==
- Forsaken Lore (30 April 2014)
- Mountains of Madness (18 December 2014)
- Strange Remnants (20 July 2015)
- Under the Pyramids (10 December 2015)
- Signs of Carcosa (6 June 2016)
- The Dreamlands (5 January 2017)
- Cities in Ruin (6 July 2017)
- Masks of Nyarlathotep (22 February 2018)
