= Mansions of Madness =

Flight games

- Mansions of Madness 2nd edition box cover
- Publishers: Fantasy Flight Games
- Publication: 2011; 15 years ago
- Years active: 2011–2016 (1st edition); 2016–present (2nd edition)
- Genres: cooperative, adventure, horror, mystery
- Languages: English, Chinese, Czech, French, German, Italian, Japanese, Korean, Polish, Portuguese, Russian, Spanish, Thai, Ukrainian
- Players: 2–5 (1st edition); 1–5 (2nd edition)
- Setup time: 10 minutes
- Playing time: 2–3 hours
- Chance: medium
- Skills: Problem solving, cooperative gaming
- Website: Mansions of Madness Second Edition

Mansions of Madness is a tabletop strategy game designed by Corey Konieczka and published by Fantasy Flight Games in 2011. Players explore a locale filled with Lovecraftian horrors and solve a mystery.

After five years, two big-box expansions, and six print-on-demand scenarios, the original Mansions of Madness was retired and replaced by Mansions of Madness Second Edition. The second edition was designed by Nikki Valens and uses an app in place of the human keeper role to run the game's scenario.

== First edition ==
Mansions of Madness requires two to five players. One player takes the role of the keeper, who is responsible for the monsters and happenings of the game; the other players take on the roles of investigators, who solve a mystery. At the beginning of the game, the players pick a storyline and set up the map accordingly. The keeper consults the rule book to make decisions about the story and to place clues and traps across the board. After setting up, the players begin at the designated starting point and if there is a main character, that player with the main character role goes first. If not, the youngest player goes first. Then the other explorers take turns exploring. Each investigator may move two spaces and carry out one action. Each investigator has a health and sanity value that is depleted when the character is wounded or scared. Each time an investigator suffers damage, the keeper may play trauma cards that inflict further penalties. For instance, an investigator might receive damage of a broken leg and be unable to move as quickly as before. or the investigator could develop nyctophobia after having an encounter with an eldritch horror. During the investigator's turn, the keeper may play mythos cards to attempt to injure the character physically or mentally, degrade or destroy their items, or otherwise set them back.

After the investigators complete their turns, the keeper gets to react. The keeper accumulates threat points equivalent to the number of investigators each turn. Threat points are a resource required to use most of the keeper's ability cards.

The keeper knows the objective from the beginning while the goal is hidden from the investigators until near the end of the game.

=== Expansions ===
Two expansions were published for the first edition of Mansions of Madness.

==== Forbidden Alchemy ====
Forbidden Alchemy was designed by Corey Konieczka, the designer of the base game, and released in 2011. It included the three new scenarios—Return of the Reanimator, Yellow Matter, and Lost in Time and Space. The expansion also contained four new investigators (Carolyn Fern, Dexter Drake, Darrell Simmons, and Vincent Lee), four new monsters (two byakhees and two crawling ones) and six new map tiles as well as additional cards and tokens. A revised printing in May 2012 included corrected cards and map set-ups for all three scenarios.

==== Call of the Wild ====
Call of the Wild was designed by Corey Konieczka and released in 2013. It included the five new scenarios—A Cry for Help, The Stars Aligned, The Mind's Veil, The Dunwich Horror, and A Matter of Trust. This expansion aimed to shift the game's focus to outdoor settings that were designed to be less linear to give players more choice in exploration and investigation. The expansion also introduced allies and non-player characters to the game and added situations where the keeper had to find clues to solve puzzles. The expansion added four new investigators (Amanda Sharpe, Bob Jenkins, Mandy Thompson, and Monterey Jack), eleven new monsters (two dark druids, two child of the goats, two goat spawns, two nightgaunts, dunwich horror, dark young, and wizard) and eleven new map tiles as well as additional cards and tokens.

=== Scenarios ===
Fantasy Flight Games released six print-on-demand scenarios separately.

1. "Season of the Witch" (2011)
2. "The Silver Tablet" (2011)
3. "Til Death Do Us Part" (2011)
4. "House of Fears" (2012)
5. "The Yellow Sign" (2012)
6. "The Laboratory" (2013)

== Second edition ==
On 4 August 2016 a second edition of Mansions of Madness was released. Aside from some minor modifications, gameplay was fundamentally the same as in the first edition but with the role of the keeper replaced by a companion app that would run through Steam on Mac or PC, Apple iOS, or Android platforms. The app expanded the gameplay in several ways including the randomisation of maps and monsters and incorporating an extended range of interactive puzzles into the app. The app allows the game to be played solo.

The second edition came with a conversion kit that allowed players who owned the first edition base game and either of its big-box expansions Forbidden Alchemy and Call of the Wild to incorporate their investigator figures, monster figures, and map tiles into the second edition game to add more variety and unlock extra scenarios. Shortly after the second edition base game was released, the two figure and tile collections Recurring Nightmares and Suppressed Memories were released to make all the first edition components available to those who did not own the first edition game or expansions.

The base game came with four scenarios of varying length and difficulty and three scenarios that could be unlocked by paying for the downloadable content (DLC). Players who owned either the first edition base game or added the Recurring Nightmares figure and tile collection could play an additional scenario. Players who owned the first edition Call of the Wild expansion or added the Suppressed Memories figure and tile collection could play an additional scenario.

=== Figure and tile collections ===
Mansions of Madness Second Edition shipped with a conversion kit that allowed those with the first edition game and either of its two expansions to use their investigators, monsters, and tiles while playing second edition scenarios. It wasn't necessary, but it did add more variety to the randomly generated game maps and monsters and gave players more choice of investigators to play. However, since production of the first edition game and expansions had ceased, Fantasy Flight Games decided to package the old game components into two new figure and tile collections and release them simultaneously. These weren't considered a true expansion but rather a re-packaging of the old, out-of-production first edition components that allowed new players to add them to their second edition game.

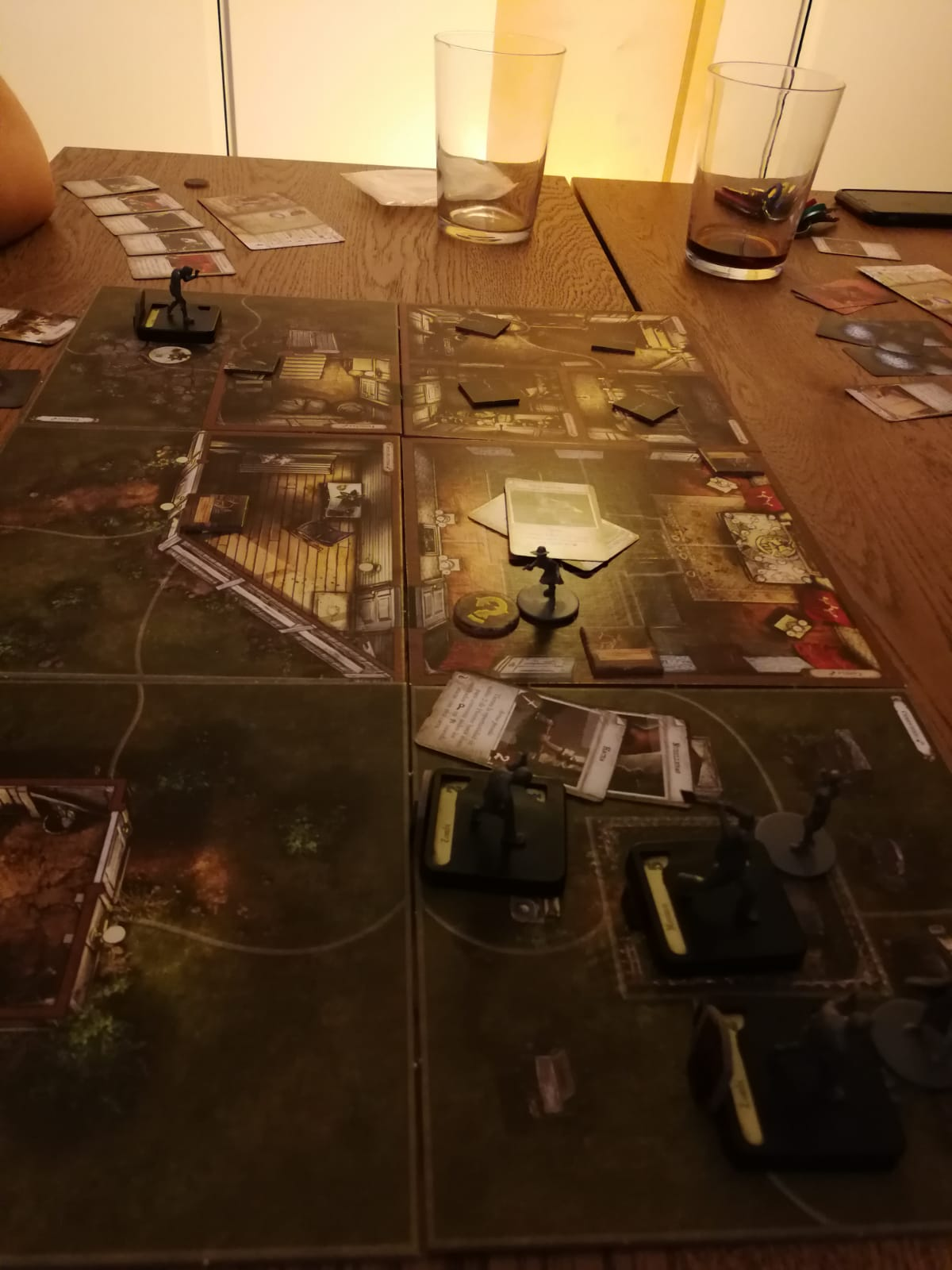
Mansion of Madness map

==== Recurring Nightmares ====
The Recurring Nightmares Figure and Tile Collection contained game components from the first edition base game—eight investigators (Jenny Barnes, Joe Diamond, Gloria Goldberg, Sister Mary, Michael McGlen, "Ashcan" Pete, Harvey Walters and Kate Winthrop), eighteen monsters (four Zombies, two Chtonians, two Cult Leaders, two Hounds of Tindalos, two Maniacs, two Mi-Go, two Witches and two Shoggoths) and fifteen double-sided map tiles. The first edition base game actually had twenty-four monster figures but the second edition base game already had the six cultists so these weren't included in this collection. This collection unlocked the "Dearly Departed" scenario for play.

==== Suppressed Memories ====
The Suppressed Memories Figure and Tile Collection contained game components from the Forbidden Alchemy and Call of the Wild expansions—eight investigators (Monterey Jack, Bob Jenkins, Amanda Sharpe, Mandy Thompson, Dexter Drake, Carolyn Fern, Vincent Lee and Darrell Simmons), fifteen monsters (two Children of the Goat, two Dark Druids, two Goat Spawns, two Nightgaunt, two Crawling Ones, two Byakhee, one Wizard, one Dunwich Horror and one Dark Young), and seventeen double-sided map tiles. This collection unlocked the "Cult of Sentinel Hill" scenario for play.

=== Expansions ===
==== Beyond the Threshold ====
The Beyond the Threshold expansion was released in January 2017 and included two new investigators (Akachi Onyele and Wilson Richards), one new monster (four Thralls) and six new double-sided map tiles, as well as additional tokens and cards that expanded the base decks. The expansion introduced key tokens and moving map tiles. The expansion unlocked two new scenarios—"Gates of Silverwood Manor" and "Vengeful Impulses".

==== Streets of Arkham ====
The Streets of Arkham expansion was released in the fourth quarter of 2017 and included four new investigators (Finn Edwards, Diana Stanley, Tommy Muldoon and Marie Lambeau), four new monsters (two Star Vampires, two Skeletons, two Hired Guns and one Lloigor), and seventeen new double-sided map tiles, as well as additional tokens and cards that expand the base decks. The expansion introduced elixir cards and improvement tokens for improving skills and a new Tower of Hanoi style puzzle type. The expansion unlocked the three new scenarios—"Astral Alchemy", "Gangs of Arkham" and "Ill-Fated Exhibit".

==== Sanctum of Twilight ====
The Sanctum of Twilight expansion was released in the first quarter of 2018 and included two new investigators (Lily Chen and Charlie Kane), one new monster (two Wraiths), and five new double-sided map tiles, as well as additional tokens and cards that expand the base decks. The expansion introduced restraint tokens and overlapping map tiles. The expansion unlocked the two new scenarios—"The Twilight Diadem" and "Behind Closed Doors".

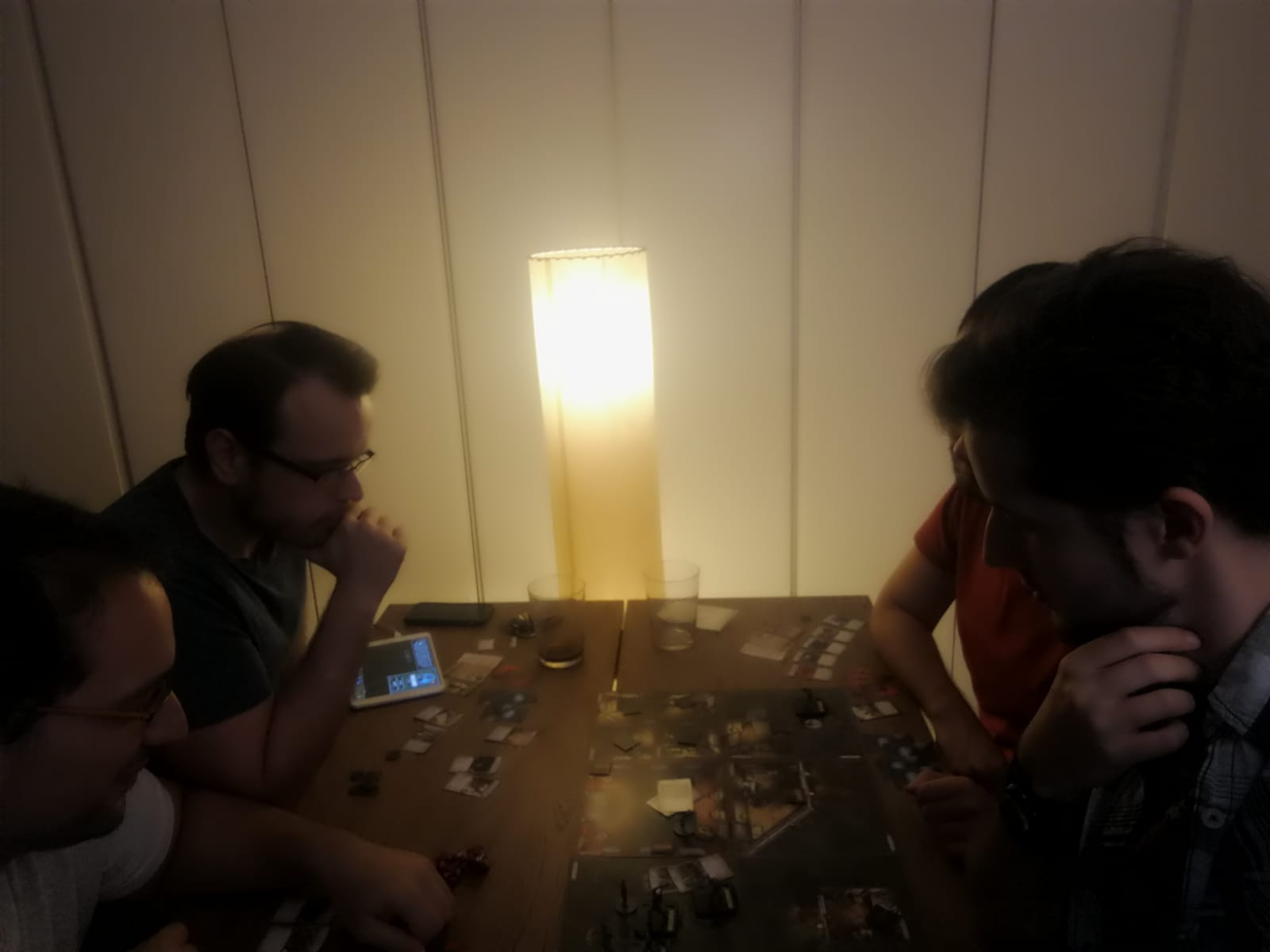
Group of friends playing Mansions of Madness

==== Horrific Journeys ====
The Horrific Journeys expansion was released in the fourth quarter of 2018 and included four new investigators (Agnes Baker, Jim Culver, Silas Marsh and Trish Scarborough), four new monsters (two Warlocks, two Dimensional Shamblers, two Hunting Deep Ones and one Formless Spawn), and eighteen new double-sided map tiles, as well as additional tokens and cards that expand the base decks. The expansion introduced agenda cards and water/rift tokens. The expansion unlocked the three new scenarios — "Murder on the Stargazer Majestic", "10:50 to Arkham" and "Hidden Depths" taking place on an airship, a train and a cruise ship.

==== Path of the Serpent ====
The Path of the Serpent expansion was released in the fourth quarter of 2019 and included four new investigators (Daniela Reyes, Leo Anderson, Norman Withers and Ursula Downs), four new monsters (two Feathered Serpents, two Temple Guardians, three Serpent Persons and one Ancient Basilisk), and seventeen new double-sided map tiles, as well as additional tokens and cards that expand the base decks. The expansion unlocked the three new scenarios — "The Jungle Awakens", "Into the Dark" and "Lost Temple of Yig".

=== Scenarios ===
Scenario	Difficulty	Duration (minutes)	Physical Requirements
"Cycle of Eternity"	2/5	60–90	base game
"Escape from Innsmouth"	4/5	90–150	base game
"Shattered Bonds"	5/5	120–180	base game
"Rising Tide"	3/5	240–360	base game
"Dearly Departed"	5/5	120–150	Mansions of Madness First Edition or Recurring Nightmares Figure and Tile Collection
"Cult of Sentinel Hill"	3/5	120–150	Call of the Wild expansion or Suppressed Memories Figure and Tile Collection
"What Lies Within"	4/5	120–150	base game + DLC (paid)
"Gates of Silverwood Manor"	4/5	120–180	Beyond the Threshold expansion
"Vengeful Impulses"	2/5	90–120	Beyond the Threshold expansion
"Dark Reflections"	3/5	180–240	base game + DLC (paid)
"Astral Alchemy"	4/5	90–120	Streets of Arkham expansion
"Gangs of Arkham"	3/5	180–240	Streets of Arkham expansion
"Ill-Fated Exhibit"	5/5	120–180	Streets of Arkham expansion
"The Twilight Diadem"	4/5	180–240	Sanctum of Twilight expansion
"Behind Closed Doors"	3/5	120–150	Sanctum of Twilight expansion
"Altered Fates"	3/5	90–120	base game + DLC (paid)
"Murder on the Stargazer Majestic"	3/5	90–150	Horrific Journeys expansion
"10:50 to Arkham"	4/5	90–120	Horrific Journeys expansion
"Hidden Depths"	5/5	120–180	Horrific Journeys expansion
"The Jungle Awakens"	3/5	90-120	Path of the Serpent expansion
"Into the Dark"	4/5	150-180	Path of the Serpent expansion
"Lost Temple of Yig"	5/5	90-120	Path of the Serpent expansion
"Turn of a Page"	5/5	120-180	base game + DLC (paid)

== Reception ==
Both the first and second editions of Mansions of Madness received favourable reviews at Eurogamer, Penny Arcade, Board Games Land, iSlaytheDragon and the Dice Tower podcast. The first edition of the game has been criticised for its complexity and the amount of time it takes to set up and play. These criticisms were largely resolved with the release of the second version. The game has been praised for its replay value, its Lovecraftian theme, and its uniqueness.

Watch It Played, a YouTube series, started out as a resource for Mansions of Madness.

== Awards and nominations ==
Mansions of Madness first and second editions have received numerous awards and nominations:

- 2011 Golden Geek Best Thematic Board Game Winner
- 2011 Golden Geek Best Board Game Artwork/Presentation Nominee
- 2011 The Dice Tower: Best Production Values
- 2011 The Dice Tower: Best Game Artwork
- 2012 As d'Or - Jeu de l'année Nominee
- 2016 The Dice Tower: Best Cooperative Game
- 2016 Golden Geek Board Game of the Year Nominee
