= List of card game designers =

A game designer is a person who invents games at the conceptual level. Outstanding game designers are recognized annually by awards such as the Spiel des Jahres and the As d'Or. The Academy of Adventure Gaming Arts & Design, a division of the Game Manufacturers Association, inducts outstanding individuals into the Hall of Fame. Mensa Select is an annual award given by American Mensa to games that are "original, challenging and well designed".

Card games can use a pack of standard playing cards or a dedicated deck. Following are some notable card game designers.

Designer	Notable work	Honors	Ref.
Dave Allsop	Magic: The Gathering		
C. Graham Baker	Gin rummy		
Elwood Thomas Baker	Gin rummy		
Michael Bennighof	Survival of the Witless		
Tom Braunlich	Star Trek Customizable Card Game		
Timothy Brown	Spellfire		
Coleman Charlton	Middle-earth Collectible Card Game		
Pavel Chuprunov	Russia Without Putin		
Rob Dougherty	Star Realms	Origins Award	
Skaff Elias	Arabian Nights, Antiquities, Legends, Fallen Empires, Ice Age, and MetaZoo		
Mike Elliott	Duel Masters Trading Card Game, Battle Spirits, and Thunderstone	Hall of Fame	
James Ernest	Brawl and Before I Kill You, Mr. Bond	Hall of Fame	
Bruno Faidutti	Citadels and Knightmare Chess	Spiel des Jahres	
Andrew Finch	Lorwyn		
Matt Forbeck	WildStorms: The Expandable Super-Hero Card Game		
Richard Garfield	Magic: The Gathering, Netrunner, KeyForge, and Android: Netrunner	Hall of Fame	
Richard Garfield	Magic: The Gathering, Netrunner, KeyForge, and Android: Netrunner	Super As d'Or	
Richard Garfield	Magic: The Gathering, Netrunner, KeyForge, and Android: Netrunner	Mensa Select	
Rob Heinsoo	Three-Dragon Ante		
Steve Jackson	Hacker, BattleCards, and Illuminati	Hall of Fame	
M. Alexander Jurkat	Battlelords		
Darwin Kastle	Star Realms	Origins Award	
Reiner Knizia	Lost Cities, Schotten Totten, and Blue Moon	Hall of Fame	
Wolfgang Kramer	6 nimmt!	Mensa Select	
Charlie Krank	Mythos	Origins Award	
Eric M. Lang	A Game of Thrones, Warhammer: Invasion, Call of Cthulhu: The Card Game, Mystick Domination, and Bloodborne: The Card Game	Hall of Fame	
Eric M. Lang	A Game of Thrones, Warhammer: Invasion, Call of Cthulhu: The Card Game, Mystick Domination, and Bloodborne: The Card Game	Diana Jones Award	
Tom Lehmann	Race for the Galaxy	As d'Or Grand Prix	
Rick Loomis	Nuclear Escalation		
Andy Looney	Fluxx		
Gene Mackles	Iota	Mensa Select	
Douglas Malewicki	Nuclear War		
Edmund McMillen	The Binding of Isaac: Four Souls		
Mike Mearls	Magic: The Gathering		
Heinz Meister	Galloping Pigs	Kinderspiel des Jahres	
Michael Menzel	Dominion		
George S. Parker	Rook		
Celia Pearce	Friendship Adventure Cards for Girls		
Christian T. Petersen	A Game of Thrones		
Andrew Rilstone	Once Upon A Time		
Merle Robbins	Uno		
Uwe Rosenberg	Bohnanza	Hall of Fame	
Mark Rosewater	Magic: The Gathering and Lorwyn	Hall of Fame	
Mike Selinker	Harry Potter Trading Card Game		
David Sirlin	Yomi		
Gertrude Strohm	Popping the Question and Novel Fortune Telling		
CA Suleiman	Vampire: The Requiem and Mummy: The Curse		
Jeff Tidball	Cthulhu 500		
Donald X. Vaccarino	Dominion	Spiel des Jahres	
Donald X. Vaccarino	Dominion	Mensa Select	
Donald X. Vaccarino	Dominion	Diana Jones Award	
Susan Van Camp	Dragon Storm		
James Wallis	Once Upon A Time		
John Wick	7th Sea and Legend of the Five Rings: Battle of Beiden Pass	Origins Award	
Teeuwynn Woodruff	Netrunner, Duel Masters Trading Card Game, Pokémon Trading Card Game, Netrunner, and Magic: The Gathering (7th edition)		

== See also ==
- History of games
- List of game designers
- List of indie game developers
- List of Magic: The Gathering artists
