= Expandable card game =

Card games where each has their own deck

Expandable card game (ECGs), also known as living card games (LCGs), (Note: The term Living Card Game is a registered trademark of Fantasy Flight Games and officially applies only to the games published by that company, which is why other publishers use different names; other names have also been used before FFG introduced the term. Their term, however, became popular among the fans, and many non-FFG games can be unofficially referred to as LCGs; for example, Shut Up & Sit Down, a board game review website, has referred to Doomtown: Reloaded, an ECG published by Alderac Entertainment Group, as such. At least one game, Android: Netrunner, has debuted as an LCG but has been rebranded as an ECG due to publisher change.) or non-collectible customizable card games (Note: The term is used as "Customizable Card Games" is one of the synonyms for the "Collectible Card Games".) - card games where each player has their own customizable deck of cards. Unlike in collectible card games (CCGs), where a player buys a starter deck of cards but then expands and improves that deck by purchasing booster packs containing a random distribution of cards, such decks are usually made from one or more sets sold as a complete whole, eliminating randomness while acquiring the cards.

Many ECGs are published by Fantasy Flight Games (FFG), which markets them under their trademarked term LCGs.

== Characteristics ==
ECGs are card games where each player has their own deck of cards. Decks for ECGs are either pre-made decks (fixed starter decks) or made from sets sold as a complete whole, eliminating randomness while acquiring the cards. Such decks can still be customized, since after non-random expansion packs are released and purchased by players, they can customize their decks according to certain deckbuilding rules.

=== Expandable Card Games vs Collectible Card Games ===
ECGs are often mistaken for CCGs. However, while these games are very similar to CCGs and can be seen as their subset (Fantasy Flight Games, for example, defines a "Living Card Game" as "a game that breaks away from the traditional Collectible Card Game (CCG) model"), they crucially lack randomness in the purchase and distribution of the cards. They are also seen as (and marketed as) costing much less than CCGs, and appeal to players who do not have time or resources to play CCGs.

According to a price guide by John Jackson Miller, such games have less of a metagame and trading dynamic compared to CCGs. The secondary market for the ECGs cards is smaller than that of CCGs, but does exist due to existence of promotional, alternate art or foil cards implemented in some of those games.

Most ECGs are sold as complete sets (instead of starter decks and booster packs containing randomized cards) and are therefore not collectible as cards (only as sets; i.e. one can purchase a non-random deck or set of their choice, and then expand it with another non-random purchase of a deck or set, if available).

Some of the games occasionally classified as ECGs were meant to be traditional CCGs with expansions containing randomized booster packs, but the booster packs were never released. Examples include Anime Madness (1996) and Calore Kids (2000). Some games have been converted into ECGs/LCGs from CCGs; for example A Game of Thrones and Call of Cthulhu: The Card Game where converted from CCGs into LCGs by their publisher.

Just like with CCGs, expansion packs or new standalone sets for successful games are released on a regular basis.

According to game historian Roger Travis, ECGs are more focused on the story narrative then regular CCGs, evoking comparison to storytelling games. They are also more likely to feature cooperative mechanics.

== History ==
According to Roger Travis, the genre has been inspired by CCGs as well as deck-building games like Dominion (Note: However, deck-building genre appeared in 2008, roughly at the same time as FFG's LCG games.) and role-playing games. In 2003 John Jackson Miller identified several games as belonging to this group, with the oldest one being Heavy Gear Fighter from 1995. The genre has been popularized by the American game company Fantasy Flight Games, which published a number of ECGs under their trademark name Living Card Games (LCGs) since 2008. One of FFGs most popular titles was Android: Netrunner, which debuted in 2012; since 2019 it has been reimplemented by Null Signal Games and rebranded as an expandable card game. Since then, ECGs have been published by other companies, such as Renegade Game Studios, publisher of Vampire: The Masquerade Rivals.

== See also ==
- Deck-building game
- Dedicated deck card game
- Digital collectible card game
- Meeple (another common term related to board games that has also been trademarked)
