= Blood Rage (disambiguation) =

Blood Rage may refer to:

- Blood Rage, a 2015 board game by CoolMiniOrNot designed by Eric Lang
- Blood Rage, a 1987 horror film directed by John Grissmer
- Bloodrage, a 1979 horror film directed by Joseph Zito
- Green Day, an American punk rock band who previously used the name before using their current name in 1989
