= Warhammer 40,000: Conquest =

Card game

- Warhammer 40,000: Conquest - core set
- Designers: Eric M. Lang
- Publishers: Fantasy Flight Games
- Publication: 2014
- Players: 2
- Setup time: < 2 minutes
- Playing time: ~ 1 hour
- Chance: Some
- Age range: 13 and up
- Skills: Card playing, Logic, Strategy
- Website: Warhammer 40,000: Conquest

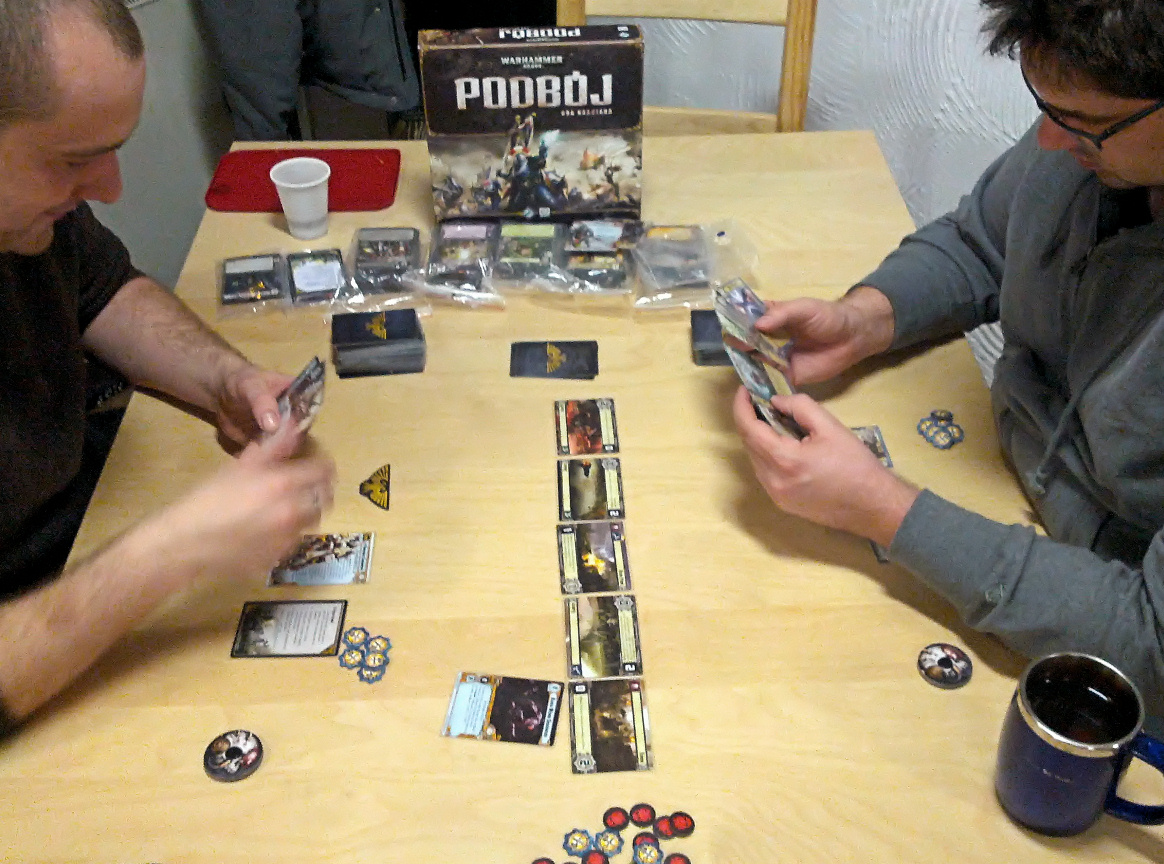
Gameplay for 2 players

Warhammer 40,000: Conquest was a Living Card Game (LCG) produced by Fantasy Flight Games from 2014 to 2017, set in Games Workshop's Warhammer 40,000 universe.

It was announced in March 2014 and was released October 3, 2014. The game featured two players competing to win a series of battles on a different planets while simultaneously securing the resources of other planets that will have battles on subsequent turns. Fans of the game praised the strategic element of having multiple distinct battle fields as a feature that distinguished it from other card games. On September 9, 2016, Games Workshop announced that Conquest would be discontinued in February 2017, as a result of Games Workshop's failure to renew Fantasy Flight Games' contract because of a conflict between Games Workshop and Fantasy Flight Games' parent company, Asmodee. The game still has a small community of players who play with the cards that were printed before the game's discontinuation in 2017, and some fans have made unofficial expansions to expand the small card pool.

== Extensions ==
=== Core set ===
Core Set includes 7 playable factions: Space Marines, Chaos, Eldar, Dark Eldar, Tau, Orks, and Astra Militarum (former Imperial Guard).

=== Deluxe extensions ===
Each deluxe expansion contains 3 copies of every card.

- The Great Devourer which adds Tyranids as a playable faction.

- Legions of Death which adds Necrons as a playable faction.

=== Cycles ===
Every cycle has 6 packs associated with it. And every pack contains 3 copies of every card released in that pack.

- WarLord cycle: Each pack contains various cards to improve Space Marines, Chaos Space Marines, Eldar, Dark Eldar, Tau, Orks and Imperial Guard

- The Howl of Blackmane
  - New Warlord: Ragnar Blackmane (Space Marine)
- The Scourge
  - New Warlord: Ku'gath plague father (Chaos)
- Gift of the Ethereals
  - New Warlord: Aun'shi (Tau)
- Zogwort's Curse
  - New Warlord: Old Zogwort (Ork)
- The Threat Beyond
  - New Warlord: Torquemada Coteaz (Astra Militarum)
- Descendants of Isha
  - New Warlord: Urien Rakarth (Dark Eldar) & Baharroth (Eldar)

- Planetfall Cycle: Each pack contains various cards to improve Space Marines, Chaos Space Marines, Eldar, Dark Eldar, Tau, Orks, Imperial Guard and Tyranids.

- Decree of Ruin
  - New Warlord: Broderick Worr (Astra Militarum) & Commander Starblaze (Tau)
- Boundless Hate
  - New Warlord: Archon Salaine Morn (Dark Eldar) & Ba’ar Zul the Hate-Bound (Chaos)
- Deadly Salvage
  - New Warlord: Gorzod (Ork)
- What Lurks Below
  - New Warlord: Subject: Ω-X62113 (Tyranid)
- Wrath of the Crusaders
  - New Warlord: Chaplain Mavros (Space Marine)
- The Final Gambit
  - New Warlord: Talyesin Fharenal (Eldar)

- Death World Cycle: Each pack contains various cards to improve Space Marines, Chaos Space Marines, Eldar, Dark Eldar, Tau, Orks, Imperial Guard, Tyranids and Necrons

- Jungles of Nectavus
  - New Warlord: Sathariel the Invokator (Chaos)
- Unforgiven
  - New Warlord: Epistolary Vezuel (Space Marine)
- Slash and Burn
  - New Warlord: Grigory Maksim (Astra Militarum)
- Searching for Truth
  - New Warlord: Illuminor Szeras (Necrons)
- Against the Great Enemy
  - New Warlord: Jain Zar (Eldar)
- The Warp Unleashed
  - New Warlord: Vha’shaelhur (Chaos)

== Card Types ==
In Warhammer 40K Conquest, there are 6 main types of cards:

- Warlords: commanders; powerful combatants. If a player's Warlord dies, he loses the game.
- Army units: main combatants; these units are deployed on Planets to do battle.
- Support cards: played in your HQ and have various game effects.
- Attachments: placed onto a Warlord or an Army unit to grant them extra attack or health.
- Events: played during the battle for single-turn effects that can drastically change the game.
- Planets: places players deploy Warlord and Army units to. A player wins the game if he manages to win three planets with the same symbol.

== World Champions ==
2014 Jeremy Zwirn playing Captain Cato Sicarius / Space Marines

2015 Varun Khetarpal playing Packmaster Kith / Dark Eldar

2016 Nathan Gardner playing Packmaster Kith / Dark Eldar

== Reviews ==
- Casus Belli (v4, Issue 13 - Jan/Feb 2015)
