= Eric Lang =

Eric Lang may refer to:

- Eric M. Lang, game designer
- Eric Lang (ice hockey) (born 1975), ice hockey player and coach
