= XCOM: The Board Game =

Board game

XCOM
- Designers: Eric Lang
- Publishers: Fantasy Flight Games
- Publication: 2015
- Genres: Board game

XCOM: The Board Game is a 2015 science-fiction themed cooperative board game, set in the XCOM universe, published by Fantasy Flight Games and designed by Eric Lang.

== Honors ==
- 2015 Spiel der Spiele Griffin Scroll Winner

== Reviews ==
- Casus Belli (v4, Issue 14 - Mar/Apr 2015)
