= Android: Netrunner =

Expandable card game

- Android: Netrunner original core set box
- Designers: Richard Garfield, Lukas Litzsinger, Damon Stone, Michael Boggs
- Publishers: Fantasy Flight Games
- Publication: 2012
- Players: 2
- Setup time: < 5 minutes
- Playing time: 30-60 minutes
- Chance: Some
- Skills: Card playing, logic, bluffing, strategy

Related games
- Call of Cthulhu, Game of Thrones Card Game

Android: Netrunner is an expandable card game (ECG) produced by Null Signal Games, previously by Fantasy Flight Games. It is a two-player game set in the dystopian future of the Android universe. Each game is played as a battle between a megacorporation and a hacker ("runner") in a duel to take control of data. It is based on Richard Garfield's Netrunner collectible card game, produced by Wizards of the Coast in 1996.

The game was launched in 2012. In 2017, a second edition of the core set was announced which replaced some of the original cards with cards from the first two expansion cycles. In 2018, Fantasy Flight Games' license with Wizards of the Coast ended, and the game was discontinued, with Reign and Reverie being the company's last expansion. During its FFG era, the game was known as a Living Card Game (LCG), which is an FFG-trademarked term for ECGs. After a brief pause, since 2019, the game has been produced by Null Signal Games (initially, Project NISEI), who release new compatible expansions and run organized tournament events.

== Gameplay ==
Like the original, the game is asymmetric and involves two players, one playing a hacker called "Runner" and the other playing a Corporation ("the Corp"). The goal of both players is to collect victory points (called "Agenda points") to a threshold of 7, but only the Corp's deck contains Agenda cards that are worth these points.

Both players only have a certain amount of game actions available in their respective turns. These actions can be used to draw additional cards, gain a currency called credits to pay for playing cards or using effects on them, or playing cards in different manners depending on the card type. Both sides have a card type for a one-time effect after which the card is placed in the discard pile of the side, but most cards are "installed" and remain on the table until they are discarded for an effect or removed by the other side.

The Corp can install Agendas or other valuable game cards called Assets or Upgrades. Such cards are placed into Servers, and other cards called ICE can be placed as countermeasures that protect these Servers. Rather than paying for the cost of a card when it is installed, all cards the Corp installs are placed face down and can be turned up later by paying its cost to activate them when the Corp wishes to or the Runner interacts with the card (this does not take a Click action). Cards discarded by the Corp are also placed face down in the discard pile. Installed Agendas can be advanced with a game action and if their requirements are fulfilled they can be scored, at which point they can also unlock additional gameplay benefits to the Corp. Other cards that are either beneficial to the Corp or detrimental to the runner can also be advanced, strengthening their effects and obfuscating which cards are Agendas and which are not or placing traps and ambushes for the Runner. The Corp's hand, deck and discard pile also each represents a Server that needs to be protected.

In their turn the Runner can play their cards for the respective cost on the card to improve their options or gain resources. However, their main goal is to perform "runs" which attack one of the Corp's Servers. In Runs they can utilize cards such as Programs that can disable ICE cards or bypass them. Once they have passed all ICE on a Server, they access all cards installed in that Server, and, depending on which Server they attacked, either a random card from the Corp's hand, the top card of the Corp's deck or all cards in the discard pile. If the runner accesses an Agenda card, they steal it and add it to their score area. Other cards can be placed into the Corp's discard pile if the Runner pays a cost to do so.

Some gameplay effects, such as certain ICE the Runner did not properly disable, will deal damage to the Runner which takes the form of discarding a random card from the Runner's hand. If they need to discard more cards than they are able to, they are "flatlined" and lose the game. Meanwhile the Corp is forced to draw a card every turn. This will force Agenda cards into their hand they need to prevent the runner from stealing, and if they are required to draw cards from a depleted deck they lose the game.

== Differences from the original ==
While the game retains much of the gameplay of the original, there are some key differences:

- The original Netrunner game was sold in randomized booster packs and semi-random starter decks, similar to Magic: The Gathering and other collectible card games. Fantasy Flight's version has been built like its other Living Card Games. The expansions are sold in fixed, non-random sets, either as monthly packs ("Data Packs"), or, less frequently, deluxe box expansions. While this approach virtually eliminates the secondary card market, card speculation, and draft formats, it also promotes an equal playing field and game play over the value of the cards.
- Fantasy Flight reprinted the original card set and various data packs after they sold out; this is similar to the company's support of its other Living Card Games. Collectible card games (like Magic) do not reprint card sets, preferring to re-build the card base and help support a secondary card market and card pricing speculation.
- The setting for the original game was based on the Cyberpunk 2020 RPG. The game has been moved to Fantasy Flight's Android setting.
- The original game had only two factions: Corp and Runner. The new version splits the two factions into four Corps (Jinteki, NBN, Haas-Bioroid, and the Weyland Consortium) and three core Runner types (Anarch, Criminal, and Shaper) as well as 3 Runner mini-factions (Adam, Apex, and Sunny Lebeau). Every deck must have an identity card from one of these factions. This card may grant one or more special abilities and sets deck-building constraints.
- A deck cannot have more than three copies of a single card (by name) in it, unless specifically stated on the card. In the original game, no limit was imposed.
- In the original game, the corp had a maximum deck size for specific numbers of agenda points (for example, 18-19 agenda points meant a maximum deck size of 45 cards, 20-21 agenda points meant max 50 cards, and so on). In the new game, the relationship is reversed; a deck size interval is tied to a number of agenda points (for example, a 45-49 card deck must have 20-21 agenda points). This means that the corporation must decide between using the lower number for more consistency, the higher number for lower agenda density, or somewhere in between.
- Some terminology has changed: bits have been replaced with credits, actions replaced by clicks, and data forts replaced by servers. Also, some card types have been renamed (for example, Prep cards are now Events).
- Some mechanics have been simplified or otherwise altered.
  - In the original game, the "trace" mechanic was a blind bid, with both players revealing their bids simultaneously. Now traces are done openly, with the Corp bidding first, followed by the Runner.
  - In the original game, the Corporation would lose the game if they received 7 Bad Publicity tokens. In Android: Netrunner the Corporation can have any number of Bad Publicity tokens without fear of losing, but each Bad Publicity token gives the Runner a free "temporary use" credit to use during each run.

Due to these changes, cards from the two games are not interchangeable. Richard Garfield has stated that "almost all [changes] are reasonable simplifications or elaborations on the original mechanics", and that he is "confident that care was taken not to change for the sake of change."

== Fantasy Flight Games releases ==
=== Cycles ===
Each Data Pack contained 60 cards, had a complete playset of new cards (typically three copies each of twenty cards), and was part of a six-pack "cycle". A new pack was released monthly during the cycle; between cycles the wait was typically three to four months.

==== Genesis ====
Expansion Name	Release date	Expansion Icon
What Lies Ahead	December 2012	Wireless
Trace Amount	January 2013	Wireless
Cyber Exodus	February 2013	Wireless
A Study in Static	March 2013	Wireless
Humanity's Shadow	May 2013	Wireless
Future Proof	June 2013	Wireless

==== Spin ====
Expansion Name	Release date	Expansion Icon
Opening Moves	September 2013	Microphone
Second Thoughts	November 2013	Microphone
Mala Tempora	December 2013	Microphone
True Colors	January 2014	Microphone
Fear and Loathing	February 2014	Microphone
Double Time	March 2014	Microphone

==== Lunar ====
Expansion Name	Release date	Expansion Icon
Upstalk	July 2014	Waxing Moon
The Spaces Between	August 2014	Waxing Moon
First Contact	September 2014	Waxing Moon
Up and Over	October 2014	Waxing Moon
All That Remains	November 2014	Waxing Moon
The Source	December 2014	Waxing Moon

==== SanSan ====
Expansion Name	Release date	Expansion Icon
The Valley	April 2015	Sun
Breaker Bay	April 2015	Sun
Chrome City	May 2015	Sun
The Underway	July 2015	Sun
Old Hollywood	August 2015	Sun
The Universe of Tomorrow	September 2015	Sun

==== Mumbad ====
Expansion Name	Release date	Expansion Icon
Kala Ghoda	January 2016	Blank Flag
Business First	March 2016	Blank Flag
Democracy and Dogma	March 2016	Blank Flag
Salsette Island	April 2016	Blank Flag
The Liberated Mind	May 2016	Blank Flag
Fear the Masses	June 2016	Blank Flag

==== Flashpoint ====
Expansion Name	Release date	Expansion Icon
23 Seconds	July 2016	Titan Transnational Credit Sign
Blood Money	August 2016	Titan Transnational Credit Sign
Escalation	October 2016	Titan Transnational Credit Sign
Intervention	November 2016	Titan Transnational Credit Sign
Martial Law	December 2016	Titan Transnational Credit Sign
Quorum	January 2017	Titan Transnational Credit Sign

==== Red Sands ====
Expansion Name	Release date	Expansion Icon
Daedalus Complex	February 2017	Centurion Helmet
Station One	March 2017	Centurion Helmet
Earth's Scion	May 2017	Centurion Helmet
Blood and Water	June 2017	Centurion Helmet
Free Mars	July 2017	Centurion Helmet
Crimson Dust	August 2017	Centurion Helmet

==== Kitara ====
Expansion Name	Release date	Expansion Icon
Sovereign Sight	December 2017	Leafless Tree
Down the White Nile	February 2018	Leafless Tree
Council of the Crest	March 2018	Leafless Tree
The Devil and the Dragon	April 2018	Leafless Tree
Whispers in Nalubaale	May 2018	Leafless Tree
Kampala Ascendent	May 31, 2018	Leafless Tree

=== Deluxe expansions ===
Deluxe expansions are released between cycles. Deluxe expansions originally focused on two factions (one Corporation and one Runner) and contain three copies of 55 cards. The fourth and fifth deluxe expansions break from this pattern; the fourth introduces three new Runner "mini-factions" along with its focus on a Corporation, while the fifth includes cards for all 7 factions and 3 mini-factions.

Expansion Name	Release date	Factions	Expansion Icon
Creation and Control	July 2013	Haas-Bioroid, Shaper	Brain
Honor and Profit	May 2014	Jinteki, Criminal	Helix
Order and Chaos	January 28, 2015	Weyland, Anarch	Eye
Data and Destiny	October 28, 2015	NBN, Runner mini-factions	Trifold
Reign and Reverie	June 2018	All factions	Omega

=== Narrative campaign expansions ===
Narrative campaign expansions include new player cards (including Runner and Corp identities), printed player dashboards (referred to as "PAD sheets") to hold stickers that will affect future games played in the same campaign setting, and packs of secret campaign cards and stickers. A Core Set is required to play a narrative campaign expansion.

Expansion Name	Release date	Factions	Expansion Icon
Terminal Directive	April 30, 2017	Criminal, Shaper, Haas-Bioroid, Weyland	Heartbeat

== Null Signal Games releases ==
=== Ashes ===
Expansion name	Release date	Expansion icon
Downfall	March 2019	Beanstalk
Uprising	December 2019	Beanstalk

=== Magnum Opus reprint ===
Expansion name	Release date	Expansion icon
Magnum Opus	July 2019	Magnum Opus

=== System ===
Expansion name	Release date	Expansion icon
System Gateway	March 2021	Portal
System Update 2021	March 2021	21 in circular arrows

=== Borealis ===
Expansion name	Release date	Expansion icon
Midnight Sun	July 2022	Globe with ripple effect
Parhelion	December 2022	Globe with ripple effect

=== Liberation ===
Expansion name	Release date	Expansion icon
The Automata Initiative	July 2023	Silhouette of a sabiá bird
Rebellion Without Rehearsal	March 2024	Silhouette of a sabiá bird

=== Elevation ===
Expansion name	Release date	Expansion icon
Elevation	April 2025	a stylized space elevator rising over natural mountains

=== Vantage Point ===
Expansion name	Release date	Expansion icon
Vantage Point	March 2026	a stylized trapezoid eye with a hexagonal pupil

=== River ===
Expansion name	Release date	Expansion icon
Ante Up	January 2027 (Scheduled)	a diamond hovering over rippling water

== Formats ==
Null Signal Games supports and maintains multiple formats for organized play. Many of these formats are affected by rotation, where cards from older sets are removed from the format and replaced with newly released cards.

=== Standard ===
The Standard format is the most popular among players. As of March, 2026, Standard contains the following sets:

- System Gateway
- Elevation
- The Ashes Cycle (Downfall and Uprising)
- The Borealis Cycle (Midnight Sun and Parhelion)
- The Liberation Cycle (The Automata Initiative and Rebellion Without Rehearsal)
- Vantage Point

The release of Elevation in April 2025 caused the Red Sand Cycle and the Kitara Cycle to rotate from the format. With this release, Standard contains no more cards from the FFG era except a few reprints included in early NSG sets.

The Standard format also has a ban list, currently the Standard Banlist 26.08. Any cards on the ban list are not to be used in Standard format-legal play.

=== Startup ===
The Startup format is a subset of the cards available in the Standard format. The startup format contains:

- System Gateway
- Elevation
- The most recent fully completed card cycle (currently Vantage Point which is a cycle of a single set.)
- All sets in any current incomplete card cycle (currently none)

In September 2024, the Null Signal Games Balance Team introduced a ban list and deckbuilding restrictions for the Startup format.

=== Eternal ===
The Eternal format consists of nearly every set of cards printed for Android: Netrunner by Fantasy Flight Games or Null Signal Games.

In place of a ban list, the Eternal format contains a points list, currently the Eternal Points List 26.03. Each Eternal format-legal deck may spend up to 7 points from the points list. When any number of a card on the points list is used, that number of points is counted. Any cards listed as "Banned" may not be used.

=== Other formats ===
Many more formats have been created for the game. These include, but are not limited to, Snapshot, Random Access Memories, and Draft, as well as many player-created formats.

== Organized play ==
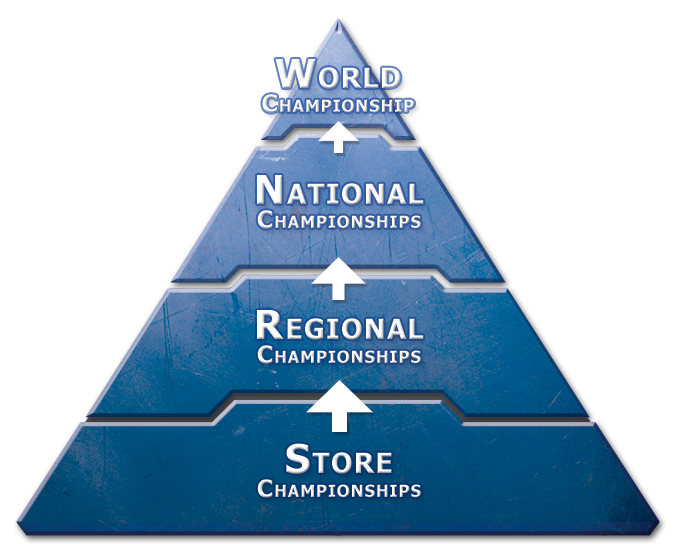
The four levels of FFG's competitive Netrunner play

=== Fantasy Flight Games era (2012–2018) ===
Android: Netrunner World Championships occurred annually during Fantasy Flight's World Championships. National, regional, and store championships precede this; each event's first-place winner receives a first-round bye in the following level of tournament play. Android: Netrunner tournaments follow a Swiss-system similar to that of Magic: the Gathering, though with a key difference: only two games are played, with each player playing as the Corporation and Runner once. In most tournaments, however, after a certain number of rounds all except the top eight or sixteen players are cut from the tournament. The tournament then shifts to double-elimination bracket, eventually crowning a winner.

Game Night Kit (GNK) tournaments are also run at times between other organized play events and usually follow the same structure, but without any byes to other events being available as prizes.

=== Null Signal Games era (2019–present) ===
Organized Netrunner events include a series of casual and competitive tournaments held every year, leading up to the World Championships, as detailed in the Null Signal Games Organized Play Policies. These events include, but are not limited to Circuit Openers, and National, Continental, and World Championships. Some of the events (excluding the World Championships) are held online, many using Jinteki.net.

Most events follow a single-sided or double-sided Swiss-system. In a double-sided Swiss tournament, each round sees each player playing once as the runner, and once as the corporation. In single-sided Swiss, there is one game per round, and players are paired such that they play a nearly even number of games as the runner and as the corporation. For events with more than 16 players, after a set number of rounds, the players with the best result from the Swiss rounds compete in the "top cut" to decide the tournament winner.

Players entering a tournament are never required to have officially printed cards. Proxies (printed stand-in cards) are usually permitted, as long as they are acceptable according to the Organized Play Policies.

There is no competitive criteria to enter the World Championships.

Null Signal World Championship locations and dates
Year	Location	Date
2022	Toronto	October 7–9
2023	Barcelona	October 13–15
2024	San Francisco	October 18–20
2025	Edinburgh	October 17–19
2026	Montreal	October 2–4

=== Online play ===
The Android: Netrunner community also conducts games online via Jinteki.net, which is a free and open-source web platform with rule implementation.

One can also try the game and learn the rules on Chiriboga which is a free and open-source web platform which consists the sets System Gateway and System Update 2021.

== Reception ==
Tripp J. Crouse for the Quad-City Times said that "The rulebook is helpful to lean the basic structure of the game, but some questions came up in the game testing with my roommate that weren't readily accessible in the rulebook. Luckily, the Internet has several online forums and fan sites with Q&As so we could find solutions to our dilemmas."

Android: Netrunner has won the 2012 Best Card Game and 2012 Best Two Player Game, at the 2012 BoardGameGeek Golden Geek Awards.
