= A Game of Thrones: Second Edition =

Card game by Fantasy Flight Games

A Game of Thrones: The Card Game Second Edition
- Designers: Christian T. Petersen, Eric M. Lang, Nate W.S. French, Damon Stone
- Publishers: Fantasy Flight Games
- Players: Two-Six^{1}
- Setup time: < 5 minutes
- Playing time: 1 - 2 hours
- Chance: Some
- Age range: 14 and up
- Skills: Card playing Arithmetic
- ^{1} Game can also be multiplayer or in teams.

A Game of Thrones: The Card Game Second Edition (or AGoT, for short) is a Living Card Game (LCG) produced by Fantasy Flight Games from 2015 to 2020. It is based on A Song of Ice and Fire, a series of novels written by George R. R. Martin. The second edition of this LCG, it is not backwards compatible with the first edition that preceded it.

It was launched in 2015. In 2019 FFG announced they will slow down releases for the game, due to "exhausting available content from [the] books". 2020 saw the release of the de facto final expansion in the series (described at that time as "the beginning of a new release model"). Since then unofficial expansions have been released by a volunteer organization called G.O.T. (Global Operation Team).

In the game, players assume the leadership of one of the great houses of Westeros vying for control of King's Landing and the Iron Throne. To accomplish this, players launch military attacks against their opponents, undermine their opponents’ plans with intrigues of their own, and make power plays to win the support of the realm.

== Reception ==
The game was praised that its "presentation is very strong [...] while the presence of a separate reference book makes the main rule book manageable for new players [...] The text on some cards could be clearer, such as when a card may be played on a character controlled by an opponent" Other reviews criticized two-player options noting that it "is at its best with four" yet others praised that "the game really shines is in its attention to the flavor, theme, and atmosphere of the stories that inspired it—not just in terms of its lavish artwork, but in the way it captures the essence of the series in its core mechanics." The game's Core Set was nominated for the 2015 Golden Geek as both Best Card Game and Best 2-Player Board Game.

== Rules ==
The game is played in a phases with each player interacting during a phase. From the official rules:

A Game of Thrones: The Card Game can be played by two or more players. A two-player game uses the joust format, while a game with three or more players uses the melee format.

In the game, each player plays as one of eight great factions vying to influence and control the Iron Throne and gain power in Westeros. Each player controls two decks: a draw deck that provides the forces a player’s faction has at its command each round, and a special plot deck that is used to develop and manage a long term strategy.

Over the course of the game the players engage one another in military, intrigue, and political conflicts, until a single player emerges victorious. The first player to amass 15 power wins the game.

== Sets and expansions ==
A Game of Thrones LCG Core Set and Deluxe Expansions
Set	Release date
A Game of Thrones : Second Edition (Core Set)	October 2015
Wolves of the North	April 2016
Lions of Casterly Rock	November 2016
Watchers on the Wall	April 2017
House of Thorns	October 2017
Sands of Dorne	March 2018
Kings of the Isles	December 2018
Fury of the Storm	May 2019
Dragons of the East	November 2019

A Game of Thrones LCG chapter packs
Cycle	Chapter Pack	Release date
Westeros Cycle	Taking the Black	December 2015
Westeros Cycle	Road to Winterfell	January 2016
Westeros Cycle	The King's Peace	February 2016
Westeros Cycle	No Middle Ground	March 2016
Westeros Cycle	Calm Over Westeros	April 2016
Westeros Cycle	True Steel	May 2016
War of the Five Kings Cycle	Across the Seven Kingdoms	July 2016
War of the Five Kings Cycle	Called to Arms	August 2016
War of the Five Kings Cycle	For Family Honor	October 2016
War of the Five Kings Cycle	There is My Claim	November 2016
War of the Five Kings Cycle	Ghosts of Harrenhal	January 2017
War of the Five Kings Cycle	Tyrion's Chain	February 2017
Blood and Gold Cycle	All Men are Fools	March 2017
Blood and Gold Cycle	Guarding the Realm	May 2017
Blood and Gold Cycle	The Fall of Astapor	June 2017
Blood and Gold Cycle	The Red Wedding	July 2017
Blood and Gold Cycle	Oberyn's Revenge	August 2017
Blood and Gold Cycle	The Brotherhood Without Banners	September 2017
Flight of Crows Cycle	The Archmaester's Key	November 2017
Flight of Crows Cycle	Journey to Oldtown	December 2017
Flight of Crows Cycle	Kingsmoot	January 2018
Flight of Crows Cycle	Favor of the Old Gods	February 2018
Flight of Crows Cycle	The Faith Militant	April 2018
Flight of Crows Cycle	Someone Always Tells	May 2018
Dance of Shadows Cycle	The Shadow City	June 2018
Dance of Shadows Cycle	The March on Winterfell	July 2018
Dance of Shadows Cycle	Streets of King's Landing	August 2018
Dance of Shadows Cycle	Music of Dragons	September 2018
Dance of Shadows Cycle	In Daznak's Pit	October 2018
Dance of Shadows Cycle	Daggers in the Dark	November 2018
King's Landing Cycle	At the Gates	April 2019
King's Landing Cycle	City of Secrets	June 2019
King's Landing Cycle	Pit of Snakes	July 2019
King's Landing Cycle	Beneath the Red Keep	July 2019
King's Landing Cycle	The Blackwater	August 2019
King's Landing Cycle	Long May He Reign	September 2019
Premium Packs	The Things We Do for Love	January 2020
