= Duelyst =

2016 video game

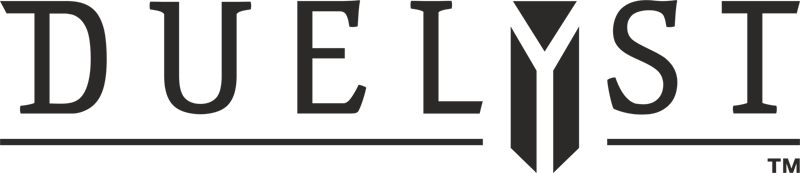
- Developer: Counterplay Games
- Publisher: Bandai Namco Entertainment
- Producer: Keith Lee
- Designers: Eric Lang; Kevin Holmes; June Cuervo
- Programmers: Emil Anticevic; Collin Hover; Marwan Hilmi; Michael Kanter; Robert Cook
- Artists: Glauber Kotaki; Anton Fadeev
- Composer: Ben MacDougall
- Platforms: Microsoft Windows, MacOS, Linux
- Release: April 27, 2016
- Genres: Collectible card game, Turn-based Strategy
- Mode: Multiplayer; single-player

Duelyst is a free and open-source digital collectible card game and turn-based strategy hybrid developed by Counterplay Games, who initially self-published the title but was later published by Bandai Namco. It had been released in an open beta period in 2015, and the full game was released on April 27, 2016. Due to declining player counts, servers for Duelyst were shut down on February 27, 2020.

On January 10, 2023, the complete source code and assets for the game were uploaded to GitHub under the CC0 license.

== Gameplay ==
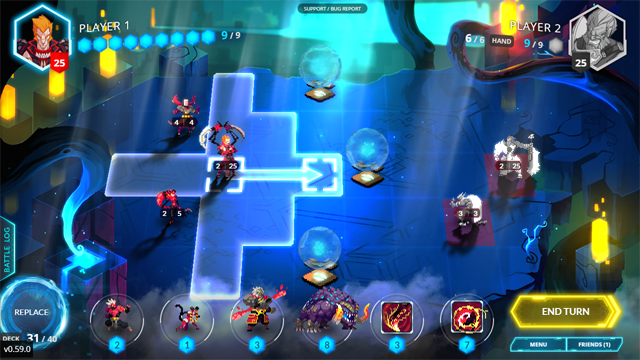
Games are played on a 5 × 9 grid. Here, a general's movement range is highlighted.

In Duelyst, two players battle across a tactical battlefield, taking turns in which they play and position minions and spells, represented by cards drawn from a custom built deck, until one of the players eliminates the enemy general. There are six factions in Duelyst, each with its own unique characteristics that affect strategy and gameplay of the decks the player builds.

The game offers a practice mode, puzzle-like challenges, a ranked season ladder and a draft-style tournament mode.

== Development ==
Duelyst development was led by Keith Lee, a former lead producer at Blizzard Entertainment, who co-founded Counterplay Games. Lee cites the Fire Emblem and Front Mission series as inspirations for the game. Duelyst was designed to accommodate short play sessions, a game lasting around ten minutes on average.

The game was part funded through a Kickstarter crowdfunding campaign, raising $137,707 in April 2014. Originally intended to follow an up-front pricing model, the game switched to a free-to-play model in 2015. The developers believed that a free-to-play model would allow for ongoing updates to the game rather than relying on less regular expansion packs. The game entered open beta testing in October 2015, and was released in April 2016 on both Microsoft Windows and OS X platforms. The iOS version, however, was subsequently removed, and the game exists only for Windows. The first major expansion "Denizens of Shim'zar" was released in August 2016. A second expansion, "Rise of the Bloodborn" was released in December 2016. A third, "Ancient Bonds" followed in March 2017. The fourth, "Unearthed Prophecy" was released in July 2017. The fifth, "Immortal Vanguard" was released in November 2017. The sixth and latest expansion, "Trial of Mythron" was released in November 2018.

Originally self-published, it was announced in July 2017 that the game would henceforth be published by Bandai Namco Entertainment, who would take on responsibilities for marketing and customer support.

Counterplay announced in January 2020 that due to declining player counts, the online servers for Duelyst will be shut down on February 27, 2020 at 3PM PST, and the game will become unplayable after that. Three years later, the studio announced that the code and game would be available as an open source project.

== Reception ==
Reception

Aggregate score
Aggregator	Score
Metacritic	82/100

The game was well received and holds a rating of 82/100 on reviews aggregation website Metacritic, based on 14 reviews. Tom Marks, writing in PC Gamer, described Duelyst as his favourite card game after Hearthstone and awarded the game 84% in his review. Matt Cox, in his review for Rock, Paper, Shotgun, praised Duelyst in comparison to its competitors, adding that the game "does so much more by slapping on a whole other game to the tried and tested CCG formula".
