= Star Wars: The Card Game =

Card game by Fantasy Flight Games

- Designers: Eric M. Lang
- Publishers: Fantasy Flight Games
- Publication: 2012
- Players: 2 (up to 4 with Expansions)
- Setup time: < 5 minutes
- Playing time: 60 minutes
- Chance: Some
- Age range: 10 and up
- Skills: Card playing, Logic, Bluffing, Strategy

Star Wars: The Card Game is a Living Card Game (LCG) produced by Fantasy Flight Games published from 2012 to 2018. It is a two-player card game set in the Star Wars universe. It puts one player in command of the light side of the Force (with the affiliations Jedi, Rebel Alliance, and Smugglers And Spies making up the light side), and one player in command of the dark side of the Force (made up of Sith, Imperial Navy, and Scum And Villainy affiliations). The Balance of the Force expansion allows multi-player games. The game is set within the time-frame of the original Star Wars trilogy.

Each player has a deck of objective cards representing various missions plus a deck of player cards of units (characters, vehicles, droids and creatures), events, enhancements and fates. Each objective is linked to a set of five player cards. Deck construction consists of choosing which objectives are to go into your objective deck, then adding each of those objective's set of five player cards to your player deck. Game play consists of deploying cards to your tableau, attacking your opponent's objectives, defending your own objectives, and committing cards to the Force Struggle.

The dark side player wins if the Death Star dial reaches 12, with this dial increasing by one on each dark side turn, effectively putting a timer on the game. It may also be increased by winning the Force struggle, destroying light side objectives, and via card effects. The light side player wins by destroying three dark side objectives before the Death Star dial reaches 12.

== Expansions ==
=== Cycles ===
Like other Living Card Games, each card cycle consists of six packs of pre-determined cards—referred to as “force packs”—that focus on a particular theme or setting from within the Star Wars universe, including story elements that have only made an appearance in the formerly canon expanded universe now known as “Star Wars Legends.” Each force pack increases players' deck-building options with sixty cards (ten cohesive objective sets with six cards in each objective set). Deluxe expansions, released between each card cycle, add a larger volume of cards to the game than an individual force pack and primarily focus on two different factions in the game, one from the light side and one from the dark side.

On January 10, 2018, Fantasy Flight Games announced that the release of the final force pack of the Alliances cycle, the sixth card cycle of the game, would mark the end of additional content for the game.

==== Hoth ====
The Hoth cycle invokes a powerful sense of location, and create a sense that the players are fighting over a specific place—in this case, Hoth. The light side player is asked to establish and defend Echo base. On the flip side, the dark side player has extra incentive to go after specific light side objectives to drive the Rebels from Hoth.

| Expansion Name | Release date |
|---|---|
| The Desolation of Hoth | December 2012 |
| The Search for Skywalker | January 2013 |
| A Dark Time | February 2013 |
| Assault on Echo Base | March 2013 |
| The Battle of Hoth | May 2013 |
| Escape from Hoth | June 2013 |

==== Echoes of the Force ====
In the Echoes of the Force cycle, Star Wars: The Card Game experiences dramatic changes taking shape as both sides learn to better channel the power of the Force. Its balance has implications that reach far beyond damaging dark side objectives or advancing the Death Star dial. The cycle turned out to be a huge boost for light side play as it provided many answers against the dominant Sith decks. By the end of the cycle, several cards were either "errataed" or put on a restricted list due to the growing dominance of mainly Jedi decks.

| Expansion Name | Release date |
|---|---|
| Heroes and Legends | February 2014 |
| Lure of the Dark Side | March 2014 |
| Knowledge and Defense | April 2014 |
| Join Us or Die | June 2014 |
| It Binds All Things | July 2014 |
| Darkness and Light | August 2014 |

==== Rogue Squadron ====
In the Rogue Squadron cycle, Star Wars: The Card Game introduces mechanics to recreate the challenge and tension of dogfighting. Pilot cards can be played as normal units or attached to vehicles, unlocking new powers and card combinations.

| Expansion Name | Release date |
|---|---|
| Ready for Takeoff | March 2015 |
| Draw Their Fire | April 2015 |
| Evasive Maneuvers | May 2015 |
| Attack Run | June 2015 |
| Chain of Command | July 2015 |
| Jump to Lightspeed | September 2015 |

==== Endor ====
The Endor cycle adds Mission cards, which are added to a command deck. When played, they become objectives under your opponent's control, and you can attack these to reap rewards.

| Expansion Name | Release date |
|---|---|
| Solo's Command | December 2015 |
| New Alliances | January 2016 |
| The Forest Moon | March 2016 |
| So Be It | April 2016 |
| Press the Attack | May 2016 |
| Redemption and Return | July 2016 |

==== Opposition ====
The Opposition cycle focuses on the struggles between pairs of factions: Jedi and Sith, Rebel Alliance and Imperial Navy, Smugglers and Spies and Scum and Villainy.

| Expansion Name | Release date |
|---|---|
| Ancient Rivals | August 2016 |
| A Wretched Hive | September 2016 |
| Meditation and Mastery | November 2016 |
| Scrap Metal | December 2016 |
| Power of the Force | February 2017 |
| Technological Terror | April 2017 |

==== Alliances ====
The Alliances cycle focuses on the friendships that emerge out of hardship and necessity and introduces new affiliation cards for each faction.

| Expansion Name | Release date |
|---|---|
| Allies of Necessity | July 2017 |
| Aggressive Negotiations | August 2017 |
| Desperate Circumstances | November 2017 |
| Swayed by the Dark Side | December 2017 |
| Trust in the Force | February 2018 |
| Promise of Power | Q2 2018 |

=== Deluxe expansions ===
| Expansion Name | Release date | Description |
|---|---|---|
| Edge of Darkness | July 2013 | “Edge of Darkness” adds 132 total cards (22 unique objective sets) that feature the dark side’s Scum and Villainy or the light side’s Smugglers and Spies. |
| Balance of the Force | December 2013 | “Balance of the Force” introduces new rules, 154 new cards, and a multiplayer Death Star dial to introduce two distinct multiplayer formats, two-versus-two team play and challenge decks. |
| Between the Shadows | January 2015 | “Between the Shadows” introduces 156 new cards. It includes two copies each of 24 unique objective sets and one copy each of 2 limited objective sets. This expansion focuses on the Jedi and Scum and Villainy factions. |
| Imperial Entanglements | October 2015 | "Imperial Entanglements" introduces 156 new cards. It includes two copies each of 24 unique objective sets and one copy each of 2 limited objective sets. This expansion focuses on the Imperial Navy and the galaxy’s Smugglers and Spies. |
| Galactic Ambitions | May 2016 | "Galactic Ambitions" introduces 156 new cards. It includes two copies each of 24 unique objective sets and one copy each of 2 limited objective sets. This expansion focuses on the Sith and the Rebel Alliance factions. |

== Organized Play ==
=== Tiers of Organized Play ===
==== Seasonal Tournament Kits ====
Seasonal Tournament Kits are the foundation of Organized Play. With three four-month seasons each year (Spring, Summer, and Winter), players can find a large variety of tournaments, game nights, and leagues at their local stores. Seasonal events are a place for newer players to experience organized tournaments and experienced players to try a new deck or alternative format, such as 2v2.

==== Store Championships ====
Store Championships kick off Organized Play each year in style. With Store Championships, you will find players of varying skill, more prizes than your weekly game night or league, and loads of fun. Store Championships are also a great chance to play in a more competitive event at your local store and vie for bragging rights and the title of Store Champion.

==== Regional Championships ====
Regional Championships are your chance to join a community that spans beyond your town or city. Regional Championships are exclusive events and offer a precious first-round bye at the country’s National Championship. Win a Regional Championship and prove to everyone that you should be taken seriously!

==== National Championships ====
National Championships are all about meeting others from across your country and seeing how you stack up against the best your country has to offer. Get to know other top players in your country and form new friendships. Compete against your fellow compatriots for the right to be crowned National Champion and a first-round bye at World Championships!

==== North American Championships ====
North America invites all competitors from around the globe to compete for prizes and prestige at the North American Championship, hosted at Gen Con in Indianapolis, IN.

==== World Championships ====
World Championships are the culmination of Organized Play each year and the fires from which champions are forged. Each November, hundreds of players from around the world arrive for five days of gaming at FFG’s very own Games Center. Play for your chance at being named World Champion and earn the right to work with the designers on creating a card for the game!

Previous world champions and cards designed
| Year | World champion | Card designed | Set card was included in |
|---|---|---|---|
| 2013 | Dennis Harlien | Vader’s Meditation Chamber | Galactic Ambitions |
| 2014 | Mick Cipra | Kyle Katarn | Galactic Ambitions |
| 2015 | Tom Melucci | Wookiee Champion | Aggressive Negotiations |
| 2016 | Brad Emon | Darth Vader | Worlds 2018 |
| 2017 | Mick Cipra | It's Beautiful | Worlds 2018 |
| 2018 | Javier Maldonado | N/A | N/A |
