= Warhammer: Invasion =

Card game

- Designers: Eric M. Lang
- Publishers: Fantasy Flight Games
- Publication: 2009
- Players: 2
- Setup time: < 2 minutes
- Playing time: ~ 1 hour
- Chance: Some
- Age range: 13 and up
- Skills: Card playing, Logic, Strategy

Warhammer: Invasion is a Living Card Game (LCG) (variant of collectible card game) designed by Eric M. Lang and produced by Fantasy Flight Games from 2009 to 2013, set in the Warhammer Fantasy universe. Like Fantasy Flight's other LCGs, Invasion is sold as a core set, which can be played on its own, or built upon with expansion packs. Each pack has a fixed set of 3 copies each of 20 cards. There are six factions in Invasion: Dwarves, Empire, Orcs, Chaos, High Elves, and Dark Elves. The first four have decks in the core set, while the elves' decks are available in the Assault on Ulthuan expansion.

Each player has a board called a "capital", which is divided into 3 zones: Battlefield, Quest, and Kingdom. The Battlefield is the area where attacks are launched, Quest determines how many cards are drawn each turn, and Kingdom determines how many resources are gathered each turn. Resources are spent to play cards. Each unit has a power rating that adds to the zone they are played into. For example, a unit with a power of 2 would add 2 damage to attacks when played into the Battlefield, 2 additional resources per turn if played into the Kingdom, or 2 additional cards drawn if played into the Quest zone.

Each zone has a base defense of 8, which may be modified with cards. A zone's defense may be lowered by damaging it, usually by attacking from the Battlefield. Once a zone's defense is at or below zero, that zone is destroyed. (The player can still use it as normal, but it is marked with a "burning" token.) The player who succeeds at destroying at least two of their opponent's zones wins the game.

The Cataclysm expansion added a multiplayer mode to the game, and the Hidden Kingdoms expansion introduced four new factions, with their own capitals: Lizardmen, Wood Elves, Skaven, and Undead. Fantasy Flight has announced that Hidden Kingdoms will be the last expansion for the game.

== List of Expansions ==
=== Battle Packs ===
Battle packs are released in "cycles" of six. Each pack contains three copies of 20 cards. (The Corruption Cycle, however, was printed under a different format, so each pack has three copies of 10 cards and one copy of 10 other cards.)

==== The Corruption Cycle ====
| Expansion Name | Release date |
|---|---|
| The Skavenblight Threat | November 2009 |
| Path of the Zealot | December 2009 |
| Tooth and Claw | February 2010 |
| The Deathmaster's Dance | March 2010 |
| The Warpstone Chronicles | April 2010 |
| Arcane Fire | May 2010 |

==== The Enemy Cycle ====
| Expansion Name | Release date |
|---|---|
| The Burning of Derricksburg | June 2010 |
| The Fall of Karak Grimaz | July 2010 |
| The Silent Forge | September 2010 |
| Redemption of a Mage | October 2010 |
| The Fourth Waystone | November 2010 |
| Bleeding Sun | December 2010 |

==== The Morrslieb Cycle ====
| Expansion Name | Release date |
|---|---|
| Omens of Ruin | March 2011 |
| The Chaos Moon | March 2011 |
| The Twin Tailed Comet | April 2011 |
| Signs in the Stars | June 2011 |
| The Eclipse of Hope | July 2011 |
| Fiery Dawn | August 2011 |

==== The Capital Cycle ====
| Expansion Name | Release date |
|---|---|
| The Inevitable City | September 2011 |
| Realm of the Phoenix King | November 2011 |
| The Iron Rock | November 2011 |
| Karaz-a-Karak | December 2011 |
| City of Winter | January 2012 |
| The Imperial Throne | February 2012 |

==== The Bloodquest Cycle ====
| Expansion Name | Release date |
|---|---|
| Rising Dawn | April 2012 |
| Fragments of Power | June 2012 |
| The Accursed Dead | June 2012 |
| Vessel of the Winds | August 2012 |
| Portent of Doom | September 2012 |
| Shield of the Gods | October 2012 |

==== The Eternal War Cycle ====
| Expansion Name | Release date |
|---|---|
| Days of Blood | November 2012 |
| Oaths of Vengeance | December 2012 |
| Battle for the Old World | January 2013 |
| Glory of Days Past | February 2013 |
| The Ruinous Hordes | March 2013 |
| Faith and Steel | April 2013 |

=== Deluxe Expansions ===
Deluxe expansions add new elements to the game, including new card types, rules, etc. All deluxe expansion provide three copies of each unique card, except for Assault on Ulthuan, which contains 1, 2, or 3 copies of each card, similar to the core set.

| Expansion Name | Release date |
|---|---|
| Assault on Ulthuan | March 2010 |
| March of the Damned | October 2010 |
| Legends | June 2011 |
| Cataclysm | July 2013 |
| Hidden Kingdoms | November 2013 |

The release of Hidden Kingdoms was the end of FFGs development of the game.
