= Blood Rage (board game) =

2015 strategic board game

- Blood Rage board game box cover
- Designers: Eric Lang
- Illustrators: Henning Ludvigsen, Mike McVey, Adrian Smith
- Publishers: CMON Limited (2015)
- Players: 2-4
- Setup time: 10 minutes
- Playing time: 60-90 minutes
- Chance: Moderate
- Age range: 13+
- Skills: Strategy, tactics, logic

Related games
- Kemet, Chaos in the Old World, El Grande

Blood Rage is a Viking themed board game designed by Eric Lang and published by CMON Limited in 2015. Each player controls a clan of mythological Vikings seeking glory as Ragnarok approaches. Played in three ages or rounds, Blood Rage features card drafting, battles and territory control via forces represented by sculpted plastic miniatures. All conflicts are resolved through playing cards, and cards are also used to improve and differentiate the different clans and the leaders, warriors, ships and monsters at their command.

Based in part on Lang's 2007 design Midgard, the game was originally released on Kickstarter, raising just under $1 million. The game was well received, landing on the recommended list for the 2015 Kennerspiel des Jahres award for strategy game of the year.

== Gameplay ==
At the beginning of each of the game's three ages or rounds, each player is dealt eight cards, keeping one and passing the rest to the player on their left, until players have six cards. There are cards which give bonuses in battle, upgrades which give special abilities to a player's forces or allow players to recruit monsters to fight on their behalf, and quests give short term victory point objectives. Each player's clan of Viking forces begins the same but quickly differentiates itself based on the drafted cards.

After drafting cards, each player takes turns sequentially, using the game's resource, Rage, to perform actions. These include upgrading a clan's abilities and forces, having those forces invade the map, or pillaging provinces. Pillaging further improves one's clan and scores points and can lead to battles with other players. Battles are resolved without luck - players secretly play a card and add that to the strength of their forces in that region to determine the winner.

At the end of each age, a portion of the board is removed as Ragnarok approaches, sending any forces on that part of the map to Valhalla and earning players glory (victory points) for each of their forces that were thus destroyed. The game supports a variety of different strategies depending on which cards the players draft, from controlling territories, winning battles, or even having one's own forces be destroyed, if a player has drafted cards that give points and bonuses for being defeated.

In strategies and mechanics, the game merges the traditions of American style games and eurogames, combining the conflict and strong theme prevalent in the former with the statistics, upgrades and lack of chance common in the latter.

== Release and Reception ==
Blood Rage was originally inspired by Lang's 2007 design Midgard. The game was launched on Kickstarter by CMON in March 2015 and delivered in November, and which point the game became widely available. One of the most publicized Kickstarter campaigns for designer board games of the year, the game was sold through Kickstarter to almost 10,000 backers, generating revenues of almost $1 million.

Blood Rage has received consistently positive reviews. Writing for Ars Technica, Aaron Zimmerman praised the card driving system allowing strategic depth and the lack of randomness in the "diceless, card-driven combat" system, and concluding that it was "a ton of fun". Ben Guarino from Inverse also commented on the swiftness of the game rounds, strategic combinations enabled by the card drafting, and tension. The components, including the plastic miniatures which represented, the mythical monsters and Viking soldiers which battle on behalf of the players, were also met with positive reception. Charlie Theel for Ars Technica latter said that Blood Rage "confirmed Eric Lang as one of the preeminent modern board gaming designers." The game was also on the recommended list for the 2015 Kennerspiel des Jahres award.

In 2019, CMON ran a Kickstarter campaign for a digital version of the game, which cost $15.

== Awards and honors ==
Blood Rage has received the following awards:

- 2016 Kennerspiel des Jahres Recommended
- 2016 International Gamers Award - General Strategy: Multi-player Nominee
- 2016 SXSW Tabletop Game of the Year Nominee
- 2016 Goblin Magnifico Nominee
- 2015 Meeples' Choice Nominee
- 2015 Golden Geek Board Game of the Year Nominee
- 2015 Golden Geek Best Thematic Board Game Nominee
- 2015 Golden Geek Best Strategy Board Game Nominee
- 2015 Golden Geek Best Board Game Artwork/Presentation Nominee
