= Doomtown =

Collectible card game

- Cardback to the original Deadlands card game.
- Designers: David Williams (classic); Mark Wootton (Reloaded, from Williams's design)
- Publishers: Pinnacle Entertainment Group (1998–2001, 2014–present); Pine Box Entertainment (2017–present); Alderac Entertainment Group (2000–2001, 2014–2016); Wizards of the Coast (1998–1999); Five Rings Publishing Group (1998)
- Players: 2–6
- Playing time: Approx 45 min
- Chance: Some
- Skills: Card playing; Arithmetic; Basic reading ability

Doomtown (originally Deadlands: Doomtown, later rereleased as Doomtown: Reloaded) is an expandable card game based on the Deadlands role-playing game. It was originally a collectible card game (Deadlands: Doomtown) that ran from 1998 through 2001, published by Wizards of the Coast (WotC) under license to Pinnacle Entertainment Group until January 2000, when WotC quit production and the license transferred to Alderac Entertainment Group; its last expansion for many years was Do unto Others from 2001. In 2014 the game was revived (as Doomtown: Reloaded) with updated rules and sold in non-randomized expansions.

During the game, each player builds locations in the town and fights for overall control. Doomtown sets itself apart from other card games in that each card doubles as a playing card, which impacts both deck building and gameplay. Players resolve certain in-game situations (such as combat) with a hand of poker, accentuating the Old West atmosphere of the game.

Doomtown is also a heavily story-driven game, with many tie-ins to the events of Deadlands at-large. In both its iterations, players are given opportunities to affect the story line, such as through tournaments where players vote on characters getting to live or die.

== Setting and story ==
=== Deadlands ===
Deadlands is a role-playing system set in the fictional Weird West, an alternative history blending elements of the American wild west, horror, and steampunk. The game is largely set between 1876 and 1879.

In 1863, a vengeful Sioux shaman known as Raven conducted a ritual known as the Reckoning, which weakened the border with the spiritual realm, unleashing terrible creatures, spirits, and undead. In addition, many people became able to harness various forms of magic, both demonic and holy. The Reckoning also caused most of California's coast to sink, leaving plateaus jutting from the ocean (a locale known as the Great Maze).

Around the same time, a new super-fuel known as ghost rock was discovered, which spurred the equivalent of a gold rush to the Great Maze, as well as a leap forward into an era of steampunk technology.

Also differentiating the setting from history, the American Civil War is still ongoing through 1879, with both the Union and Confederacy pushing westward. There are also various other sovereign powers, such as the Sioux Nation, Coyote Confederation, Nation of Deseret, and City of Lost Angels.

=== Deadlands: Doomtown ===
In its original printing run (1998–2001), Doomtown was set in Gomorra, a boomtown on the edge of the Great Maze. Due to a preponderance of ghost rock in its vicinity, various factions fight for control of the town.

As the town grew and factions arrived, the conflict between the peacekeeping Law Dogs and an outlaw gang called the Blackjacks escalated toward a climactic shootout at high noon. The violence rocked the town, but greater conflict brewed in the background.

The second story arc focuses on the Whateley family and the Flock. Despite attempts by Confederacy and Union agents to stop them, the Flock and Whateleys succeed in using a mother lode of ghost rock in the middle of town to summon a demon from Hell. The demon destroys much of the town but is defeated along with the Flock. Surviving factions race to build rail lines and control Gomorra's ghost rock reserves. The leader of the Flock returns with the backing of Lost Angels, and uses a ritual to cause a catastrophe known as the Storm, razing the town and killing almost all of its residents.

==== Factions ====
- Blackjacks: A local outlaw gang, constantly robbing the town and populace. Their founder, Blackjack, holds a grudge against the Sweetrock Mining Company. Released in Episode 1&2.
- Law Dogs: The law of the town, they pursue fugitives and dispense justice. Released in Episode 1&2.
- Collegium: Mad scientists and researchers who use ghost rock to power their gadgets. Released in Episode 1&2.
- Sweetrock Mining Company: Corporation headquartered back East, who use extensive capital and aggressive tactics to control the mines. Released in Episode 3.
- Whateleys: A notorious family of hucksters involved in witchcraft, demonology, and hexes. They are rumored to breed with abominations. Released in Episode 4.
- Sioux Union: A nation formed by Native American tribes, with a local representation of warriors and shamans working to expel evil from Gomorra. Released in Episode 5.
- Maze Rats: A band of pirates loyal to Chinese forces out of Shan Fan (i.e. San Francisco) that raid the local mines. Released in Episode 6.
- Texas Rangers: Agents of the Confederacy, charged with a policy to "shoot or recruit" supernatural forces. Released in Episode 7.
- The Agency: Agents of the Union, these "men in black" are tasked with eradicating abominations and evil. Released in Episode 8.
- The Flock: A cult in Gomorra that employs holy magic, and has a different member personifying each of the deadly sins. Released in Episode 9.

=== Doomtown: Reloaded (AEG era) ===
The Reloaded iteration of Doomtown, published initially by Alderac Entertainment Group (AEG), picks up in Gomorra about a year after the events of the Storm. There was enough remaining ghost rock to encourage rebuilding Gomorra, aided by the rail lines.

An escalating conflict builds between the Law Dogs and the Sloane Gang of outlaws, culminating in a high noon shootout and a dead sheriff. A mysterious illness sweeps through town, and the secretive Fourth Ring circus open a sanitarium for relief efforts, while the Morgan Cattle Company use 'mad science' in search for a cure. The Fourth Ring are revealed to be turning the townsfolk into zombies. They unleash this horde on Gomorra, but are thwarted by the combined efforts of the other factions. Under new leadership, the Sloane Gang take over and force the Law Dogs into exile.

==== Factions ====
- Law Dogs: The law and order of the town, representing the sheriff's office (including mad scientists working to develop an advanced arsenal) and various religious figures with access to holy magic.
- Sloane Gang: A violent gang of outlaws that threaten the town. They use unholy magic in service of their crimes.
- Morgan Cattle Company: A ranching powerhouse which has branched out into mining and mad science.
- The Fourth Ring: A mysterious circus which is actually an association of abominations and unholy spellcasters working on behalf of the Reckoner known as Pestilence.
- Eagle Wardens: An independent organization spearheaded by people from various Native Americans tribes, who use shamanic magic to thwart evil.
- 108 Righteous Bandits: A loose gang of outlaws, transients, kung fu disciples, East Asian immigrants, and religious figures. They steal from the rich on behalf of the exploited masses.

=== Doomtown: Reloaded (PBE era) ===
Picking up in the immediate aftermath of the AEG era of publication, Pine Box Entertainment (PBE) broadened the story's horizons to encompass the wider world of Deadlands. It follows various characters fleeing Gomorra in the aftermath of the town's destruction by the Fourth Ring and the Sloane Gang.

The exiles run into nefarious villains such as the Servitors, representatives of the four Reckoners (known by some as the Four Horsemen), and become involved in the gunfight at the O.K. Corral.

==== Factions ====
When the game transitioned from AEG to Pine Box, all cards remained legal, so the factions remained the same mechanically. However, the factions were realigned thematically to account for the wider setting the game now covered, and were given the new names seen below. The more specific factions from the AEG era became considered aspects of the broader factions.

- Anarchists (formerly the 108 Righteous Bandits)
- Entrepreneurs (formerly Morgan Cattle Company)
- Fearmongers (formerly The Fourth Ring)
- First Peoples (formerly the Eagle Wardens)
- Law Dogs (now encompassing more than Gomorra's law)
- Outlaws (formerly the Sloane Gang)

== Release history ==
=== Deadlands: Doomtown (1998 to 2001) ===
During the game's initial development, Doomtown was advertised as Doomtown: The Legend of Caine County. It was being developed by Five Rings Publishing (FRP), which was acquired by Wizards of the Coast (WotC) as part of the TSR buyout. WotC thus acquired Doomtown and released the game's first set.

The game was an instant success: Doomtown won the 1998 Origins Awards for Best Trading Card Game and Best Graphic Presentation of a Card Game. WotC produced the initial run of 'episodes' (a series of smaller expansions under the FRP's Rolling Thunder distribution model of frequent small expansions), the Pine Box Edition (a more traditional base set as the game transitioned to a more typical collectible card game release model), Shootout at High Noon (a set of two fixed decks to pick up and play), and the next three expansions.

When WotC's contract with Pinnacle Entertainment Group (the owner of the Deadlands property) ended in 1999, they chose not to renew. Alderac Entertainment Group then acquired the rights to publish Doomtown from Pinnacle, and released a new base set, Boot Hill Edition, in 2000. This was followed by three traditional expansions and a final box set of fixed cards as the final expansion upon the game's cancellation. That last expansion was Do unto Others from 2001.

==== Timeline ====
Name	Year	Size	Expansion symbol
Episodes 1 & 2	1998	156	none
Episode 3	1998	52	none
Episode 4	1998	52	Club suit
Episode 5	1998	52	Club suit
Episode 6	1998	52	Club suit
Episode 7	1998	53	Diamond suit
Episode 8	1998	52	Diamond suit
Episode 9	1998	51	Diamond suit
Pine Box Edition	1999	320	Heart suit
Shootout at High Noon	1999	73	Down-pointing triangle
Mouth of Hell	1999	181	Spade suit
A Reaping of Souls	1999	181	Latin Cross
Revelations	1999	182	Ω (omega)
Boot Hill Edition	2000	319	Outlined Greek Cross
Ashes to Ashes	2000	158	White star
Eye for an Eye	2000	157	Four dot punctuation
Do unto Others	2001	199	Cross of Jerusalem

=== Doomtown: Reloaded (AEG era, 2014 to 2016) ===
After the final set of Doomtown classic, fans kept the game alive by holding their own tournaments and making fan content. Eventually, via a flier from the 2014 GAMA Trade Show, it was revealed that Doomtown: Reloaded would be released by AEG in 2014, with updated rules and sold in non-randomized expansions as an expandable card game. The base set was released at GenCon 2014, where the inaugural tournament was held.

After the initial base set of 145 cards, expansions fell into one of three size categories: Pine Boxes (40–42 cards), Saddlebags (21–23 cards), or Faction Pack (42 cards). From 2014 to 2016, AEG released these expansions on a regular schedule of three Saddlebags followed by a Pine Box. In 2015, they inserted an extra release into the schedule, the Faction Pack "Immovable Object, Unstoppable Force", which introduced the 108 Righteous Bandits and Eagle Wardens as factions (the other four factions had all been introduced in the base set).

Throughout its run, AEG also released Organized Play kits which stores could order to offer as prize support in tournaments, containing various knickknacks such as playmats, and alternate art promos of various cards. In 2016, AEG announced that they would no longer be producing new content for the game and halting tournament support.

==== Timeline ====
Name	Year	Type	Expansion code
Doomtown: Reloaded	2014	Base set	DTR
New Town, New Rules	2014	Saddlebag	NTNR
Double Dealin'	2014	Saddlebag	DD
Election Day Slaughter	2015	Saddlebag	EDS
Faith and Fear	2015	Pine Box	F&F
Frontier Justice	2015	Saddlebag	FJ
No Turning Back	2015	Saddlebag	NTB
Nightmare at Noon	2015	Saddlebag	N@N
Immovable Object, Unstoppable Force	2015	Faction Pack	IOUF
The Light Shineth	2015	Pine Box	TLS
Dirty Deeds	2015	Saddlebag	DDeeds
Foul Play	2015	Saddlebag	FP
Bad Medicine	2015	Saddlebag	BadM
Ghost Town	2016	Pine Box	GT
The Curtain Rises	2016	Saddlebag	TCR
A Grand Entrance	2016	Saddlebag	AGE
The Showstopper	2016	Saddlebag	TSs
Blood Moon Rising	2016	Pine Box	BMR

=== Doomtown: Reloaded (PBE era, 2017 to present) ===
In early 2017, the newly formed company Pine Box Entertainment (staffed by fans of Doomtown) announced that they had contracted with Pinnacle Entertainment Group to produce new expansions for Doomtown and continue organized play. As part of this partnership, Pine Box would work with PEG to bring more elements from the Deadlands RPG into the game.

In September 2017, PBE and PEG launched the Kickstarter for the first expansion in this new era, "There Comes a Reckoning". It successfully funded in 10 minutes, and raised over $170,000 in total. After fulfillment of that expansion and its stretch goals in 2018, the game returned to traditional releases through Pinnacle with "Too Tough to Die" that autumn . The third expansion by Pine Box ("Out for Blood") was released in the third quarter of 2019.

==== Timeline ====
Name	Year	Expansion code
There Comes a Reckoning	2018	TCaR
Too Tough to Die	2018	2T2D
Out for Blood	2019	O4B
Hell's Comin' with Me	2020	HCWM
Welcome to Deadwood	2020	W2D
Weird West Edition	2021	DT2

== Gameplay ==
Doomtown, like most collectible card games, has two places where a player can show their skill and creativity: deck construction and playing skill.

=== Terms ===
The game uses the terms below to define the game mechanics. Some of these terms are printed on certain cards, while others are produced or mentioned in the game during play.

- Ghost Rock (GR): The money of the game. Used to buy or pay upkeep on items, dudes, etc.
- Production and Upkeep: Production gives a specified number of GR per turn, while upkeep costs a specified number of GR per turn to keep the card in question.
- Influence: A characteristic of some Dudes, it shows how much the town populace knows, fears or respects them, and is used to prevent another player from winning and controlling deeds.
- Control: A characteristic of some Deeds, which shows how important the structure is to the town, and is used to win the game.
- Victory Points: Like control, but it is won in game and cannot be taken away.
- Bullets: The combat prowess of a Dude. The higher it is, the more cards you can use to make a poker hand. There are two types of bullets, Draw and Stud (affecting the hand similarly to draw and stud poker).
- Outfit: The faction a dude belongs to. Dudes that belong to no specific outfit are called Drifters.
- Pull: Drawing the top card of your (or sometimes an opponent's) Deck. This is used to determine if Spells or Gadgets are successful, or other game effects.
- Draw Hand: A hand of poker.
- Shootout: The combat phase of the game.
- Cheatin': A Draw hand that has two or more cards with the same rank and suit (such as two aces of spades), not counting jokers. These hands are "illegal" and may be punished by Cheatin'! action cards.
- Boot: When a card is used, it is usually booted (turned sideways) to indicate this.
- Fear Level: This changed with each expansion as storyline progressed. The higher this is, the nastier the town has become.
- Boot Hill: The graveyard of the game's cards. In contrast to the discard pile, the Boot Hill isn't reshuffled into the deck when the deck becomes depleted.

=== Deck construction ===
There are eight types of cards in Doomtown: Actions, Dudes, Goods, Events, Deeds, Spells, Improvements, and Jokers. Each of those cards uses a specific Playing card suit: spades (Dudes), clubs (Actions), hearts (Goods/Events/Spells), diamonds (Deeds/Improvements). Players use a variable number of each type of card (depending on their focus) to construct their deck. Furthermore, each card has a rank (1–13, from ace to king). In some types (Dudes and Goods) cards with high rank are generally more powerful, while in the others (Deeds and Actions) cards with low rank are generally more powerful. Each Doomtown deck resembles a poker deck, but with one major difference: players are allowed to include multiples of a specific rank-suit combination, at the risk of making some of their poker hands illegal. This way, players not only have to choose cards with useful powers, but also have to choose cards that will allow them to draw good poker hands. Outfits are also represented by a home card which gives starting funds, starting income and a useful ability.

==== Restrictions ====
- Each deck must be exactly 52 cards plus one Outfit card and up to two Jokers.
- There can be no more than four copies of a card with the same name in a deck.
- There can be no more than four copies of a card with the same value and suit in a deck.

==== Types of cards ====
- Deeds: These are used for two reasons, to provide income and to win the game. Deeds have three defining stats - control, cost, and production/upkeep. Some deeds have actions or restrictions on them
- Dudes: These are your gang, ranging from old-style Wild West desperadoes and lawmen, to Lovecraftian witches and mad scientists. Each dude belongs to a specific outfit (except for drifters) denoted by a small icon below the character's influence. Dudes are used to conduct your business and disrupt your opponent's plans, and are often expendable.
- Goods: The normal stuff your dudes will equip and use, from Horses and New Hats to Death-Ray contraptions and mystical Bullets.
- Spells: These are used by the different spellcasters and come in three types – hexes (used by hucksters), Spirits (used by shaman) and Miracles (used by blessed).
- Events: Random stuff that happens in town. Events are not played directly, but take effect when they appear in your draw hand during a gambling phase. Only one event per player can resolve each gambling phase.
- Actions: These are all the nasty surprises you will play on your opponent(s). They are divided into Noon actions (playable on their own), Shootout actions (played during a shootout), and Reactions (played in response to another action).
- Jokers: You can have up to two Jokers in your deck. There are various Jokers to choose from - some are simply wild cards, while others have secondary abilities but restricted usage (e.g. only in shootouts) or only when making a 'pull' (a one-card pull to determine the outcome of something within the game.

==== Deck focus ====
Players usually employ a strategy of focusing their deck on doing one thing well, with many viable goals to choose from. Some outfits are better equipped for some goals; for instance, Blackjacks (the game's outlaw gang) usually have good shootout stats and other offensive abilities. Below are some popular deck types. Players may mix two or more types, such as a shootout deck that partly relies on spells.

- Shootout: These decks focus on hunting down and killing the opponent's most influential characters, so that they can win the game with just a few Control Points. Usually full of action cards.
- Spellslinging: These decks focus on using one or two characters packed with spells to manipulate the game. For example, one could use spells to reduce the opponent's influence until the end of the turn, again enabling a win with just a few Control Points.
- Hiding/Turtling: These decks focus on pumping out more control points than the opponent could handle, and winning without much bloodshed, in effect "buying the town". The Sweetrock faction is notorious for this. Another variation of this type is the Collegium's first outfit ability, which gives control points for building Mad Science gadgets.
- Flooding: Overwhelming the opposing player by putting as many deeds as possible into play as quickly as possible.

=== Rules ===
The game is played in turns (called "days"). Each turn consists of four phases. During High Noon, beginning with the Gamblin' winner, players alternate taking one action at a time; a player who passes may still act later in the same phase, and the phase ends only when both players pass in immediate succession. In each phase, players play one action each until they all pass consecutively. (In contrast, in Magic: The Gathering, each player may perform as many actions in a row as desired.) When all phases are complete, a new turn begins.

==== Phases ====
- Gambling Phase is a round of lowball poker, where the worst hand wins. The winner gets one GR from each of the other players and wins initiative, gaining the first action in the following phases of play (with actions then proceeding clockwise). In this phase, very illegal decks may be punished, because players cannot manipulate their cards to avoid an illegal hand (as in shootouts).
- Upkeep Phase is a round in which players to gather GR from deeds with production and pay GR for the upkeep of cards (or discard cards to avoid paying upkeep).
- High Noon is the main part of each turn, in which players can buy deeds and goods, recruit new dudes for their gang, move dudes around to take control of other deeds, start shootouts, and generally promote their strategy while disrupting that of the opponents.
- Nightfall is the end of each turn, when scores are counted and a win may be declared. Otherwise, each player prepares for the next turn: booted cards are unbooted and play hands are refilled. The player with the most influence at nightfall is rewarded with an extra bonus card for their play hand.

==== Movement ====
Movement is a major part of the game. Dudes must move from one place to another, and their ability to do so is based on the physical arrangement of the deeds. A deadly shootout hand may be useless if unable to catch the opponent's dudes while they are moved around town to disrupt businesses.

==== Victory conditions ====
The game is won when, during Nightfall, one player has more control + victory points than the highest total influence of a single opponent. (In a later rules revision, a variant called for beating the "lowest total influence", which leads to quicker multiplayer games for tournaments.)

Control points are acquired by controlling deeds that provide them. Deeds are controlled by the player with the most influence at the deed; if there is a tie then the owner of the deed controls it (even if they're not involved in the tie). Some goods also have control points.

Victory points are given by meeting a condition of a card. For example, the Law Dogs outfit grants a victory point each time their controller kills a wanted dude with more than one influence or puts a wanted dude in jail. Some jobs earn victory points as well.

==== Uniqueness ====
Due to the game's emphasis on storylines, dudes and deeds are unique; if one copy is in play (or in Boot Hill), a second copy cannot be played by any player. (Some exceptions are made for particularly common archetypes, such as the random drifting gunman or the dingy saloon.) The game employs "card memory": if a dude or deed card is changed (e.g. a dude's influence is permanently reduced), discarded, and then played again, the changes upon the card will remain in effect. The previous two points changed with Doomtown: Reloaded. Cards became unique to each player not to all players. Therefore each player could have the same card in play with the same name. Also, there is no longer card memory with that release / rule set.

==== Shootouts ====
There are situations when a player desires to control a location or kill an opposing dude. This is accomplished through game combat, called a "shootout", which is modelled on a poker faceoff. The default way to engage in a shootout is to call-out the opposing dude, who may either refuse or stay and fight. If he stays, both players gather a posse of their dudes and drifters for the shootout.

The shootout has two phases: the action phase and the draw phase. During the action phase, players perform shootout actions, either from their hand (e.g. 'Sun in Yer Eyes' or 'Out of Ammo'), or printed on cards in their posse. Shootout actions are used to influence the posse's combat potential, by increasing the player's bullet rating or reducing the opposing posse's bullet rating.

During the draw phase, each player draws as many cards as the bullet rating allows: five cards, plus extra cards for Stud bullets, plus the option to discard and replace cards for Draw bullets (done as one lump group). Each player then tries to form the best poker hand from their cards. Due to jokers and Cheatin', five of a kind is possible. The Dead Man's Hand (ace of spades, ace of clubs, eight of spades, eight of clubs and jack of diamonds) is ranked highest. Each poker hand has a rating from 1 (high card) to 10 (dead man's hand), and the losing player suffers a number of casualties equal to the difference in ratings. (In case of ties, each player suffers one.) After that, if neither player wishes to withdraw, the shootout continues for another round.

A typical shootout strategy is to force the opponent's most crucial dudes (usually those with high influence) to enter an unfavorable shootout. Various action cards allow this, such as 'Ambush', 'Don't Like Yer Looks!' and 'Massacre'.

== Reviews ==
- Backstab #9
- Backstab #10 (Sweetrock)
- Rue Morgue #12
