= Eric M. Lang =

Canadian game designer

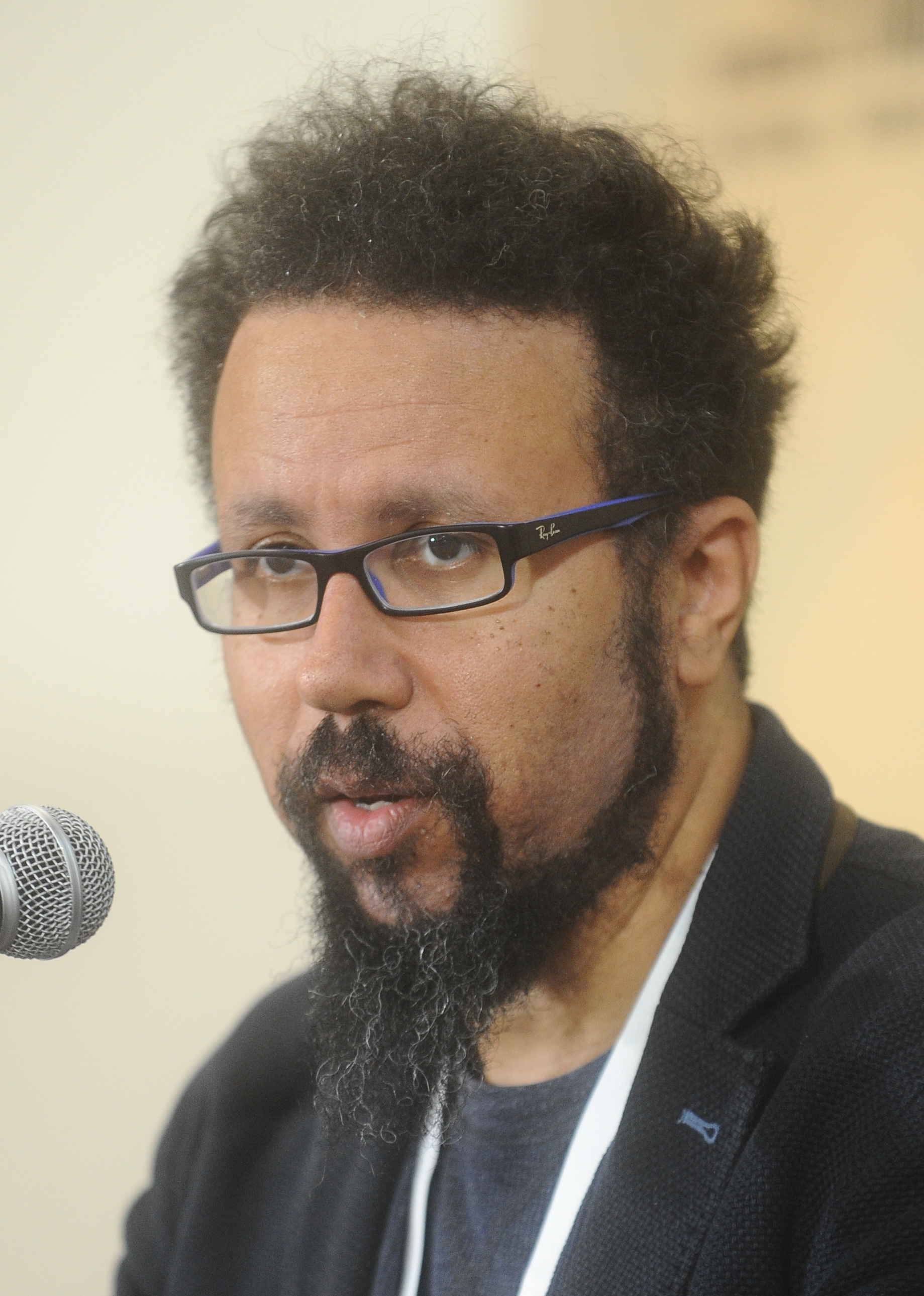
- Lang in 2017
- Born: Montreal, Quebec, Canada
- Occupation: game designer
- Years active: 2000–present
- Notable work: A Game of Thrones: The Card Game; Call of Cthulhu: The Card Game; Blood Rage

Eric M. Lang is a Canadian game designer. He began his career as a playtester for FASA before publishing his first game, Mystick independently in 2000. He has since worked with publishers Fantasy Flight Games, WizKids and CMON, among others. He is the recipient of the 2016 Diana Jones Award. In March 2017, Lang became CMON's director of game design. Lang left his position with CMON in September 2020 to focus on freelance work and activism in the board game industry.

== Controversy ==
In July 2020, Lang was temporarily suspended from Twitter after expressing support for Black Lives Matter. Lang attributed the ban to a targeted harassment campaign, and his account was later reinstated.

== List of games ==
- A Game of Thrones: The Card Game (2002)
- A Song of Ice & Fire: Tabletop Miniatures Game (2018)
- Arcadia Quest (2014)
- Ancestree (2017)
- Ankh: Gods of Egypt (2021)
- Blood Rage (2015)
- Bloodborne: The Card Game (2016)
- Call of Cthulhu: The Card Game (2004)
- Chaos in the Old World (2009)
- Cthulhu: Death May Die (board game) (2018)
- Dice Masters (with Mike Elliott) (2014)
- Dilbert: The Board Game (2006)
- Duelyst (video game) (2016)
- Disney Sidekicks (2021)
- Fantasía S.A. (2008)
- Frenzy (2003)
- Kaosball: The Fantasy Sport of Total Domination (2014)
- Marvel United (2020)
- Marvel United: X-Men (2021)
- Midgard (2009)
- Mystick: Domination (2000)
- Secrets (2017)
- Senator (with Kevin Wilson, 2004)
- Quarriors! (with Mike Elliott) (2011)
- Rising Sun (2018)
- Star Wars: The Card Game (2012)
- The Godfather: Corleone's Empire (2017)
- The Others (2016)
- Trains and Stations (2013)
- Warhammer 40K: Conquest (2014)
- Warhammer: Invasion (2009)
- XCOM: The Board Game (2015)
