= Fantasy Flight Games =

American game company

Coordinates: 45°0′56″N 93°11′5″W

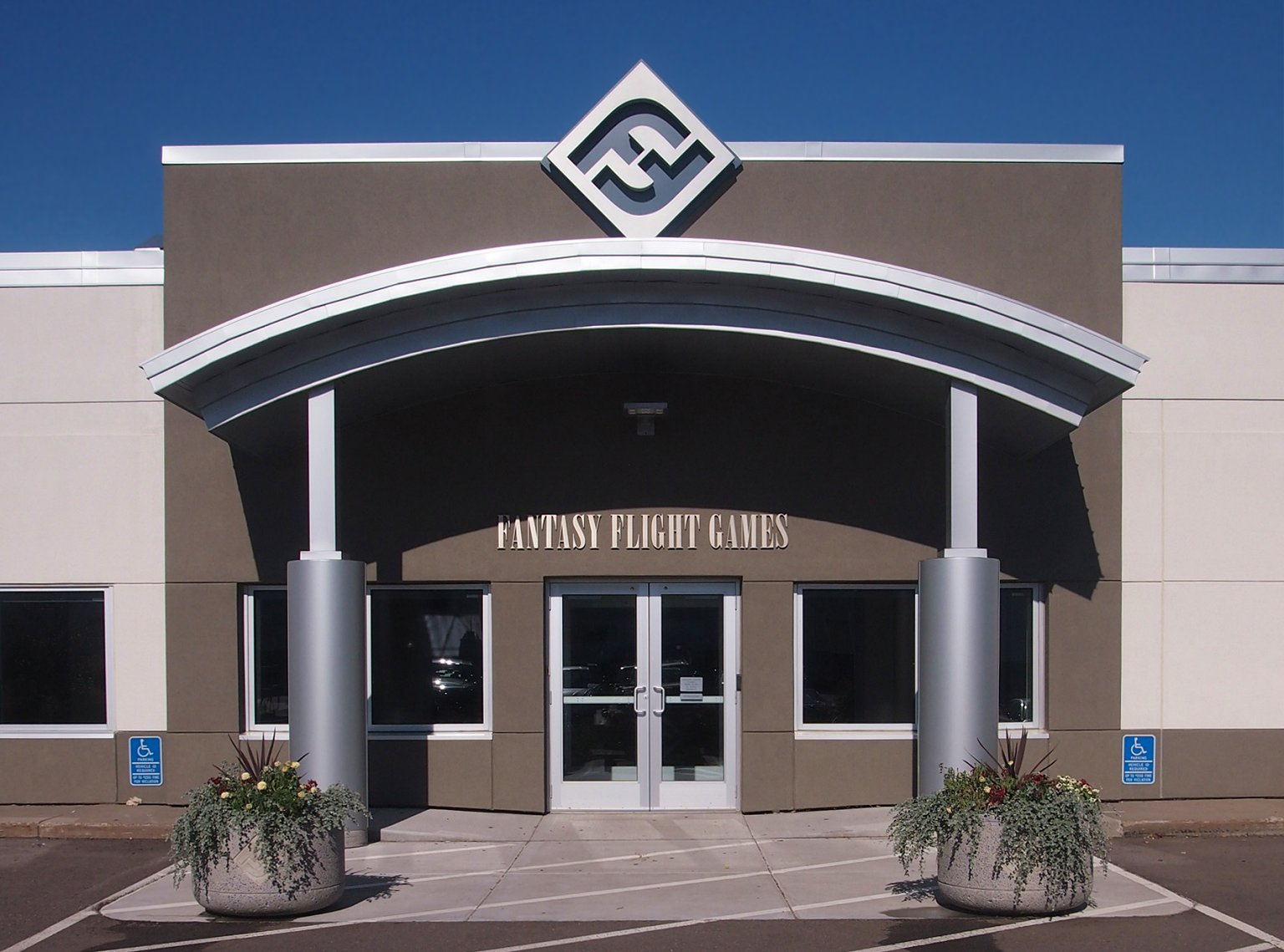
- Main entrance of the Fantasy Flight Games headquarters in Roseville, Minnesota
- Type: Division
- Industry: Tabletop games
- Founded: 1995; 31 years ago
- Founder: Christian T. Petersen
- Headquarters: Roseville, Minnesota, United States
- Key people: Chris Gerber (CEO)
- Products: Role-playing games, board games, card games, dice games
- Number of employees: 64 (2010)
- Parent: Asmodee North America (2014–present)
- Website: fantasyflightgames.com

Fantasy Flight Games (FFG) is a game developer based in Roseville, Minnesota, United States, that creates and publishes role-playing, board, card, and dice games. In 2014, it became a division of Asmodee North America.

== History ==
Fantasy Flight Publishing was founded in 1995 by its CEO Christian T. Petersen. Since the release of its first game product (Twilight Imperium) in 1997, the company has been doing business as Fantasy Flight Games (FFG). Since that time, FFG has become one of the biggest names in the hobby games industry, being a marketplace leader in board games and maintaining strong businesses in the card game, roleplaying game, and miniature game categories.

From 2000 through 2008, FFG produced a series of supplements and adventures for Dungeons & Dragons 3rd edition under the Open Gaming License. This series was collectively known as Legends & Lairs. These books included supplements for classes, expanded magic, and environments, as well as a series of Instant Adventure booklets.

In 2008, FFG partnered with Games Workshop to represent Warhammer and Warhammer 40,000 settings in role-playing, board, and card games. FFG announced the end of that partnership on September 9, 2016. Effective February 28, 2017, FFG no longer offers for sale any games made in conjunction with Games Workshop.

In August 2011, Fantasy Flight Games acquired the license for card, miniature and role-playing games set in the Star Wars universe. They have also created board and card games for the well-known licenses Game of Thrones, Battlestar Galactica, and The Lord of the Rings, as well as board games based upon popular computer games: Doom: The Boardgame, StarCraft: The Board Game, and World of Warcraft: The Board Game. They are also known for revising and reprinting popular or cult classic games, including Cosmic Encounter, Arkham Horror, Talisman, and Netrunner.

From 2010 to 2013 FFG was Dust Studio's partner in publishing and distributing Paulo Parente's miniature wargame Dust Tactics. Commenting on the shift in 2013 Petersen stated “it became clear that Paolo and the Dust games would be better served by a partner who specializes in the unique business of miniature games.”

Fantasy Flight Games was known for their game franchise Midnight, which was also made into a movie called Midnight Chronicles by the company's short-lived Landroval Studios. As of 2012, it appears that Midnight is no longer produced or supported by Fantasy Flight.

On November 17, 2014, it was announced that Fantasy Flight Games had agreed on a merger with French board game publisher Asmodée Éditions.

Asmodee has helped to bring some of Fantasy Flight's board games to digital form, and in October 2017, Asmodée and Fantasy Flight announced the formation of Fantasy Flight Interactive, a division of the merged companies to bring more of Fantasy Flight's physical board games to digital implementations. However, as part of a company-wide layoff, Fantasy Flight opted to close Fantasy Flight Interactive in January 2020.

In December 2019 through January 2020 Asmodee announced they were moving towards focusing on Fantasy Flight Games' core boardgame-, dice- and card- games. Their tabletop role-playing games like Star Wars and Genesys will move to Edge Entertainment and Miniatures games like X-wing and Armada to Atomic Mass.

== Games ==
=== Living Card Games ===
Living Card Game is a term trademarked by Fantasy Flight Games for expandable card games. FFG defines a "Living Card Game" as a variant of collectible card games. LCGs have regular expansions and deck construction like CCGs, but do not have the "blind buy purchase model" of CCGs. Instead of randomized starter decks and booster packs, LCGs have starter sets and expansion packs with fixed non-randomized distribution of cards. Their starter sets come with pre-constructed starter decks, and are designed to be self-contained; they can be played by themselves or expanded for constructed play with expansions. Expansion packs are released on a monthly or near-monthly basis, each containing 60 cards, with a number of copies of each unique card equal to the limit of the number of copies a player is allowed in their deck (e.g. three copies of each card in an Android: Netrunner pack). Larger "deluxe" expansions are released less frequently, and typically contain many more cards and sometimes introduce new game mechanisms.

Many games from other companies use a similar distribution model, but because "Living Card Game" and its initials "LCG" are registered trademarks of Fantasy Flight Games, other publishers do not use this term. For example, Upper Deck Entertainment relaunched VS System in 2015 as an LCG-style game but markets it as a "Two-Player Card Game" or "2PCG" and similar Doomtown: Reloaded was called an "expandable card game".

Fantasy Flight Games currently prints the following LCGs:

- The Lord of the Rings: The Card Game (2011)
- Arkham Horror: The Card Game (2016)
- Marvel Champions: The Card Game (2019)

Fantasy Flight Games has previously printed the following LCGs:

- Call of Cthulhu: The Card Game (2008–2015)
- A Game of Thrones: The Card Game (first edition) (2008–2015)
- A Game of Thrones: The Card Game Second Edition (2015–2020)
- Warhammer: Invasion (2009–2013)
- Android: Netrunner (2012–2018)
- Star Wars: The Card Game (2012–2018)
- Warhammer 40,000: Conquest (2014–2017)
- Legend of the Five Rings: The Card Game (2017–2021)

Fantasy Flight has also printed Blue Moon Legends, which is a comprehensive collection of Blue Moon and its expansions. Although it has similar gameplay and a fixed card set like a Living Card Game, it was not released in the Living Card Game line.

=== KeyForge ===
Fantasy Flight Games published the card game KeyForge in 2018. Created by Magic: The Gathering designer Richard Garfield, KeyForge differs from other collectible card games (CCGs) in that the game uses procedural generation to create unique decks. Commonly, CCGs are sold in pre-built decks or boosters packs. Fantasy Flight Games calls KeyForge a "unique deck game" because each deck contains a procedurally designed character unique to that deck called an Archon. IGN described the game as "a bold new idea and a vastly different kind of game format", but questioned the randomization model, speculating that "people won't be spending tons of money on single rare cards, but that may have been replaced with spending tons of money on random deck boxes in the hopes of getting lucky with a great card combination. On June 22, 2022, it was announced that Ghost Galaxy had acquired KeyForge from Fantasy Flight Games.

== Awards ==
=== 2016 Origins Awards ===
- Board Game - Star Wars: Imperial Assault, designed by Justin Kemppainen, Corey Konieczka, and Jonathan Ying
- Miniatures Game - Star Wars Armada, designed by James Kniffen, Christian T. Petersen
- Role-Playing Game - Star Wars: Force and Destiny, designed by Jay Little
