= Mystick Domination =

Card game

Mystick Domination is a 2000 card game published by Anoch Game Systems.

== Gameplay ==
Mystick Domination is a game in which players embody powerful Mysticks who battle for worldly domination by wielding Tarot magic to manipulate, deceive, and outlast their rivals.

== Reviews ==
- Pyramid
- Backstab #21
