= Call of Cthulhu: The Card Game =

Card game based on the Cthulhu Mythos

- Call of Cthulhu CCG's card back design
- Designers: Eric M. Lang, Nate French, James Hata, Damon Stone
- Publishers: Fantasy Flight Games
- Players: 2
- Setup time: < 2 minutes
- Playing time: ~ 30 minutes^{1}
- Chance: Some
- Age range: 14+
- Skills: Card playing Arithmetic
- ^{1} Games may take much longer or shorter depending on a deck's play style and the number of players.

Call of Cthulhu: The Card Game (formerly the Call of Cthulhu Collectible Card Game) is an out-of-print card game produced and marketed by Fantasy Flight Games from 2004 to 2015. It is based on Chaosium's Call of Cthulhu role-playing game, the writings of H. P. Lovecraft, and other Cthulhu Mythos fiction.

It was launched in 2004 as a collectible card game (CCG). In 2008, Fantasy Flight moved the game over to its Living Card Game (LCG) format, which retains the deck-building aspect of collectible card games, but without the random distribution. The game final expansion was released in 2015.

It shares art and characters with FFG's other Cthulhu Mythos products Arkham Horror and Elder Sign.

== Overview ==
Chaosium had previously been involved in the collectible card game (CCG) business in the mid-1990s, printing Mythos, its Cthulhu mythos CCG. Chaosium discontinued the game in 1997 after poor sales. In 2004, Chaosium instead licensed the property to Fantasy Flight Games (FFG), allowing FFG to produce the official Call of Cthulhu Collectible Card Game. It was designed by Eric M. Lang as a more accessible introduction to gaming in the Mythos environment and to provide a fast and lively interplay with the usual elements of the mythos (e.g. arcane tomes and secrets, paranormal investigations, the elder gods and their terrible servants, dark sinister plots, inhuman conspiracies, and dangers from beyond the stars). The game is nominally set in 1928.

FFG staffer Darrell Hardy developed the background for the game. Most of the storyline text (including card names and flavor text) was written by creative developer Pat Harrigan. In the Living Card Game format, the original story line was penned by Nate French, with the help of Dan Clark. Since 2010 all story lines have been created by the game's current developer Damon Stone.

== The game ==
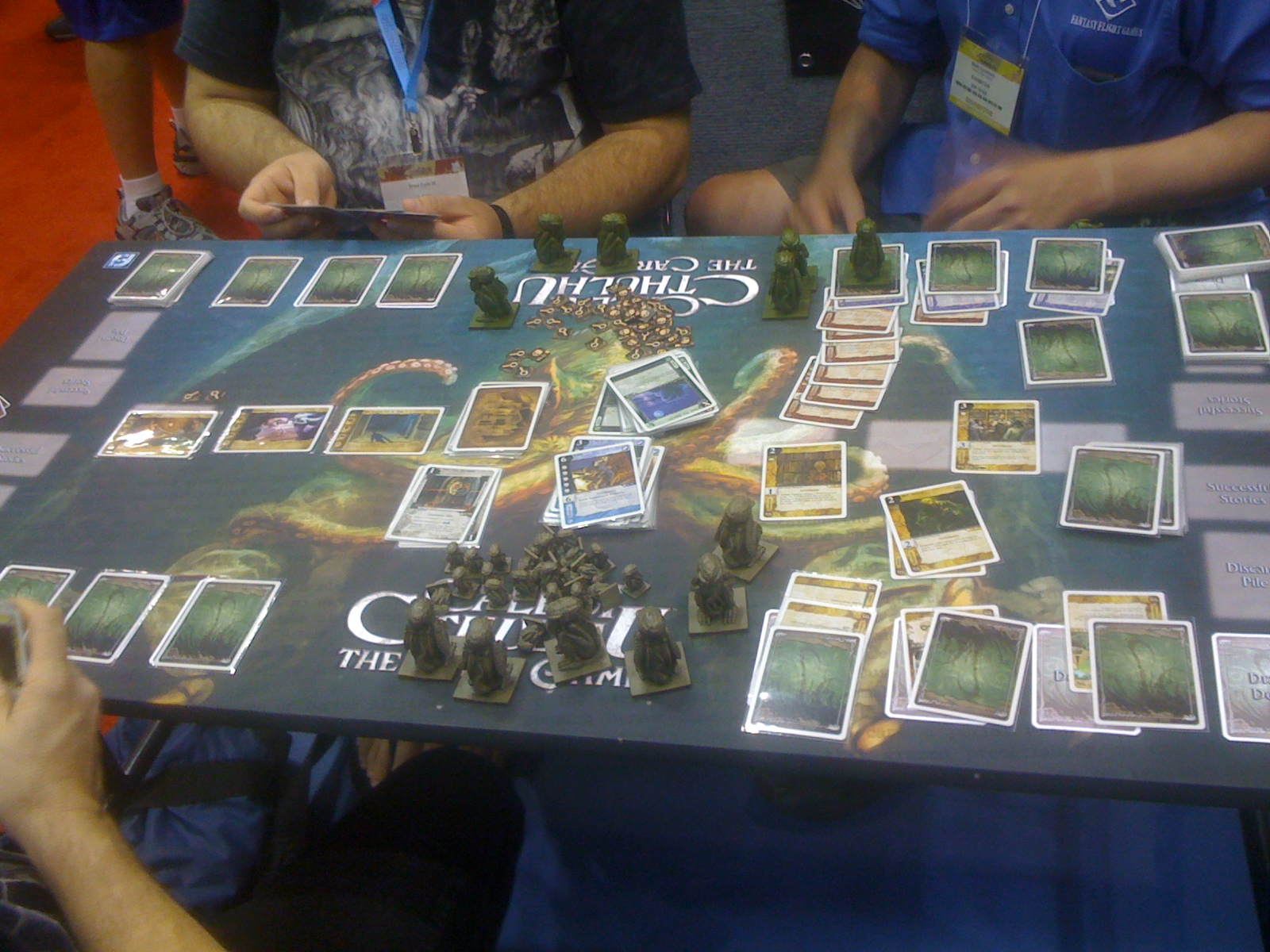
A game in progress at Gen Con Indy 2009

Players attach resources (taken from the cards in their hand) onto blank placeholder cards known as domains, later "draining" them by putting a drain counter on them to play various cards. Both players compete to complete stories by winning success tokens. Five success tokens wins a story; three stories wins the game. Players typically assign character cards to stories, to win struggles and gain these success tokens. Additionally, the first player to run out of cards to draw from loses the game, making deck destruction another potentially effective strategy.

=== The cards ===
Five types of card exist in Call of Cthulhu: Story Cards, Character cards, Event cards, Support cards and Conspiracy cards. All cards (except story cards) have a cost and belong to a faction (described below). Various cards have subtypes (such as investigator, tome, or location).

- Story cards come from a shared deck, and are the object of the game. Players compete by placing "success tokens" on these story cards. Once a player has placed 5 success tokens they win the story, earning the option to execute (or ignore) the effect written on it. Once a player has 3 story cards they win the game. Standard players use the 10 latest story cards, of which 3 randomly chosen are in play at any time. The Nameless City is a special promotional Story card that requires 10 success tokens but allows a player to win the game instantly. Another promotional story card is named "The Challenge From Beyond" (after a story written in collaboration by H.P. Lovecraft and four of his correspondents), and has the opposite effect: it cannot be won like a normal story, but players may draw extra cards by scoring "successes" at it.
- Character cards are a player's agents, used to attempt to complete stories. They possess a skill rating (used to succeed at stories) and may also have icons, which indicate the card's abilities during the icon struggle phase of play.
- Event cards have one-time effects and do not remain in play.
- Support cards have persistent effects, incurring lasting benefits or hindrances.
- Conspiracies are introduced in "Conspiracies of Chaos." These function similar as Story cards but are played from the players' decks.

=== The factions ===
There are eight factions in Call of Cthulhu, as well as "neutral" cards (light grey in color) that are not part of any faction. A card may only be played if a domain with that faction attached is drained (neutral cards can be paid for using any faction).

- The Agency: This "investigator" faction comprises the Blackwood Detective Agency, law enforcement agencies, and others involved in criminal justice. Its symbol is a badge, and its color is blue.
- Miskatonic University: This "investigator" faction represents the academic prowess of Lovecraft's fictional Miskatonic University, as well as other academic groups. Its symbol is a scroll, and its color is gold.
- The Syndicate: This "investigator" faction represents the underworld element of human society, including mobsters, killers and journalists. It mainly focuses on Danny O'Bannion's gang and its contacts. Its symbol is a dollar sign in a triangle and its color is dark brown.
- The Order of the Silver Twilight: This "investigator" faction is a later addition to the game and is based on the secret cabal of the same name from the Call of Cthulhu mythos, whose members must pass through successive ranks of occult initiation and ritual to emerge into the inner sanctum of the Order, there to pursue their quest for ultimate earthly - and unearthly - power. Its symbol is a trident in a cross, and its color is silver grey.
- Cthulhu: This "mythos" faction includes Cthulhu himself, as well as his associated cultists and monsters (such as deep ones and shoggoths). Its symbol is a squid, and its color is green.
- Hastur: This "mythos" faction centers on Hastur, especially his King in Yellow aspect, as well as his worshippers and minions, largely human psychopaths and monstrous Byakhees, as well as werewolves. Its symbol is the Yellow Sign, and its color is yellow.
- Yog-Sothoth: This "mythos" faction centers on Yog-Sothoth, and the scholars who worship it, as well as various trans-dimensional beings including Nightgaunts and Star vampires; it also hosts several undead monsters. Its symbol is a key, and its color is purple.
- Shub-Niggurath: This "mythos" faction centers on Shub-Niggurath and the many, many monsters she is responsible for creating (notably Dark Young, ghouls, and Dholes). Its symbol is a goat's head, and its color is red.

== Availability ==
The Call of Cthulhu card game is currently produced in the form of a core set, featuring cards from 7 factions, neutral cards, story cards, success/wound tokens, a full-colour manual, a game board, and Cthulhu-shaped domain markers. (The 8th faction, Order of the Silver Twilight, does not appear in the core set.) The game is ready to play and decks can be made quickly by combining cards from two of the factions along with several neutral cards.

=== Collectible Card Game ===
Older products may still be available from retailers, though these cards have black borders and different backs. Official tournaments so far have been "white border only", so it is not necessary to chase down the older cards. The only reasons to do so are for fun or to complete a collection, though if intended for play, sleeves are required to disguise the different backs.

CCG sets

- Arkham Edition (1st base set)
- Unspeakable Tales (1st expansion)
- Forbidden Relics (2nd expansion)
- Eldritch Edition (2nd base set)
- Masks of Nyarlathotep (3rd expansion)
- Forgotten Cities (4th expansion)

Arkham Edition and Eldritch Edition also included "Premium Starter Sets" that contain two playable decks, primarily consisting of reprints from the normal sets, and a series of promo cards given as attendance awards for participating in official tournaments.

Each booster pack contains 11 cards (including 3 'uncommon' and 1 'rare'). In addition, the Arkham and Eldritch base sets offered starter sets with fixed contents, designed to introduce players to the game.

In May 2006, Fantasy Flight Games announced their decision to cease releasing cards in a CCG format, and to instead begin releasing smaller sets of cards as single decks with fixed contents in the LCG format. These "Asylum Packs" would be released once-a-month, and were initially designed to be compatible with the CCG cards. Released approximately once a month, these expansions were designed to increase the players' card pool in a balanced and affordable way. Three copies of twenty new cards are introduced in each pack, for a total of 60 cards. The initial printings of the sets included varying quantities of each card to echo the rare, uncommon, and common rarities of the original game, and this distribution may still be found in some out-of-print packs. Casual gamers can play using a single core set and have the option of using supplemental packs if they want to.

Original Asylum Packs

- Spawn of Madness (first pack)
  Asylum Pack III - Conspiracies of Chaos cover
- Kingsport Dreams (second pack)
- Conspiracies of Chaos (third pack)
- Dunwich Denizens (fourth pack)

=== Asylum Packs ===
The Asylum Packs proved to be very popular, encouraging Fantasy Flight to convert the entire game into the LCG format. On February 5, 2008, Fantasy Flight announced that they would be publishing a new "Core Set" of cards in October 2008, incompatible with the original CCG cards, and that two additional Asylum Packs, The Mountains of Madness and Ancient Horrors, would be published to follow the existing Asylum Packs and complete the first cycle, "Forgotten Lore"; all six packs were reprinted in 2011 as pieces of a unified set, with a single set icon and continuous numbering. Fantasy Flight continued printing monthly Asylum Packs, arranged into six-piece cycles, for several years.

Forgotten Lore

- Spawn of Madness
- Kingsport Dreams
- Conspiracies of Chaos
- Dunwich Denizens
- At the Mountains of Madness
- Ancient Horrors

Summons of the Deep

- The Spawn of the Sleeper
- The Horror Beneath the Surface
- The Antediluvian Dreams
- The Terror of the Tides
- The Thing from the Shore
- The Path to Y'ha-nthlei

The Dreamlands

- Twilight Horror
- In Memory of Day
- In the Dread of Night
- The Search for the Silver Key
- Sleep of the Dead
- Journey to Unknown Kadath

The Yuggoth Contract

- Whispers in the Dark
- Murmurs of Evil
- The Spoken Covenant
- The Wailer Below
- Screams from Within
- The Cacophony

The Rituals of the Order

- The Twilight Beckons
- Perilous Trials
- Initiations of the Favored
- Aspirations of Ascension
- The Gleaming Spiral
- That Which Consumes

Ancient Relics

- The Shifting Sands
- Curse of the Jade Emperor
- The Breathing Jungle
- Never Night
- Into Tartarus
- Shadow of the Monolith

Revelations

- Written and Bound
- Words of Power
- Ebla Restored
- Lost Rites
- The Unspeakable Pages
- Touched by the Abyss

=== Deluxe Expansions ===
In July 2012, Fantasy Flight announced that they would switch to a new distribution model: instead of the near-monthly Asylum Packs, there would be one 165-card deluxe expansion every four months, beginning with Seekers of Knowledge.

- Secrets of Arkham (110 cards) Fantasy Flight has announced that the reprint will have 3 copies of each player card (i.e. 150 deck cards and 10 story cards), like the other deluxe expansions. It will be released early 2014.
- The Order of the Silver Twilight (165 cards)
- Seekers of Knowledge (165 cards)
- The Key and the Gate (165 cards)
- Terror in Venice (165 cards)
- Denizens of the Underworld (165 cards)
- The Sleeper Below (165 cards)
- For The Greater Good (165 cards)
- The Thousand Young
- The Mark of Madness

== Gaming milestones ==
=== Yithian Deck ===
In May 2006, as a special promotion, copies of the Yithian deck were handed out to tournament organisers. The Yithian deck was a purposely unbalanced deck, ignoring normal deck-building rules and featuring overpowered cards representing Yithians. Since these cards are so overpowered, they are illegal in normal tournament play. This Yithian Tournament had the following special rules:

- The first-place finisher challenges the Yithian deck, as played by the tournament organizer.
- If the first-place finisher is defeated, the second-place finisher takes his spot, and so on.
- All challengers must use the same deck they played in the tourney.
- The first player to defeat the Yithian deck takes a copy of the deck home.

The Yithian Deck consists of the following promo cards:

- Y1 Pnakotic Elder x6
- Y2 Great Race Scientist x6
- Y3 Yithian Soldier x6
- Y4 Master of Time and Space x8
- Y5 Displaced x4
- Y6 Library at Pnakotus x8
- Y7 Traveller of Aeons x2

=== Player Designed Cards ===
The winners of the Call of Cthulhu World Championship are invited to design a card that is released within the other products. These cards usually have a high power level, and the art features the likeness of the person that designed it. A number of these cards depict Tom Capor's character, the Archmage Magnus Arcanis.

Card	Tournament	Player	Artist	Appears in
Assistant to Dr. West	2005 Worlds	Gregory Gan; Pittsburgh, PA	Patrick McEvoy	Forgotten Cities expansion
Mentor to Vaughn	2006 Worlds	Christopher Long; State College, PA	Patrick McEvoy	Kingsport Dreams asylum pack
Descendant of Eibon	2007 Worlds	James Black; Pittsburgh, PA	Henning Ludvigsen	The Terror of the Tides asylum pack
Harry Houdini	2008 Worlds	Scott Ferguson	Tony Foti	The Cacophony asylum pack
The Mage Known as Magnus	2009 Worlds	Tom Capor	Henning Ludvigsen	That Which Consumes asylum pack
Hall of Champions	2010 Worlds	Tom Capor	Tiziano Baracchi	Written and Bound asylum pack
The Festival	2011 Lieges	Graham Hill	Tiziano Baracchi	The Key and the Gate expansion
The Mage's Machinations	2011 Worlds	Tom Capor	Tiziano Baracchi	Terror in Venice expansion
Thaumaturgical Insight	2012 Nationals	Tom Capor	Damon Westenhofer	The Mark of Madness expansion
The Archmage, Arcanis	2012 Worlds	Tom Capor	Mark Behm	The Mark of Madness expansion
The Archmage's Attaché	2013 Nationals	Tom Capor	Tiziano Baracchi	The Thousand Young expansion
Jeremiah Kirby	2013 Worlds	Jeremy Zwirn	Romana Kendelic	The Thousand Young expansion
Seer of the Gate	2014 Worlds	Jeremy Zwirn	Jarreau Wimberly	The Mark of Madness expansion
A New Day	2015 Worlds	Tom Capor	Adam Schumpert	Given out as gifts during various events
A New Day	Also depicts Tom Capor's gaming group of Jon Lekse, Selene Parkhurst, and Rhett Jenkins

=== Game Night Kit ===
On December 18, 2012, Fantasy Flight announced retailer-incentive "Game Night Kits", meant to serve as demo kits and encourage new players to get into the series. The kits include alternate art versions of existing cards to be used as prizes, as well as a unique deck box, promotional poster, and two sets of specialized wound tokens.

== Programs ==
=== Servitor Program ===
Fantasy Flight Games have set up the Servitor program to help tournament organizers by giving tournament support, like promo cards, Sanity Certificates and access to special promotional items like the Yithian Deck, to give away as prizes.

=== Sanity Redemption ===
Older products in the line come with Sanity Points on the packaging, which range from 1 Sanity Point on boosters, to 5 on Asylum packs. Servitors are given Sanity Certificates to hand out to tournament winners. These Sanity Points could be redeemed until June 30, 2008 for items like promo cards or T-shirts.

== Awards ==
- In 2005, Flagship magazine awarded the Call of Cthulhu CCG the title "Best Card Game of 2005."
- In 2008, InQuest Gamer magazine voted the Call of Cthulhu CCG the number 57 ranking Game of All Time saying that it "broke new ground with domain-based resource mechanics and great integration of the requisite horror and madness themes."

== Reviews ==
- Pyramid
- Rue Morgue #87

== Discontinuation ==
On the September 22, 2015, it was announced that Fantasy Flight Games would cease all tournament support and stop developing new expansions after the 2015 World Championship. The Mark of Madness expansion, focusing on Hastur, was the last expansion, completing a cycle of expansions for all 8 factions. In total the game had 10 deluxe box expansions and 7 cycles of 6 asylum packs through the years. Fantasy Flight Games announced that they will keep the ability to reprint already released expansions on demand.

== See also ==
- Mythos, a collectible card game based on the Cthulhu Mythos universe.
- List of collectible card games
