= 2018 in games =

This page lists board and card games, wargames, miniatures games, and tabletop role-playing games published in 2018. For video games, see 2018 in video gaming.

== Games released or invented in 2018 ==
- The Binding of Isaac: Four Souls
- The Devil's Level card game
- Decrypto
- Dominaria (a Magic the Gathering set)
- Everdell
- Heroes of Land, Air & Sea
- Just One
- KeyForge
- The Quacks of Quedlinburg
- Rising Sun
- Root
- Star Wars: X-Wing Second Edition
- Take the Galaxy

== Game awards given in 2018 ==
- Lisboa won the Spiel Portugal Jogo do Ano.
- Azul won the Spiel des Jahres.
- The Quacks of Quedlinburg won the Kennerspiel des Jahres.
- Dragon's Breath won the Kinderspiel des Jahres.
- Zweihänder won "Best Game" among the 2018 ENnie Award winners.

== Deaths ==
Date	Name	Age	Notability
January 31	William O'Connor	47	Artist for Dungeons & Dragons and Magic: The Gathering
April 2	Laura Roslof	69	Illustrator for Palace of the Silver Princess
June 25	Garry Spiegle	72	Co-founder of Pacesetter Ltd
September 12	Carl Sargent	65	Game designer on Fighting Fantasy and Greyhawk
September 16	Layman Allen	91	University professor who designed the game WFF 'N PROOF
September 29	Duke Seifried	83	Miniatures sculptor
October 11	Greg Stafford	70	Game designer and founder of Chaosium

== See also ==
- List of game manufacturers
- 2018 in video gaming
