= National Academic Games Project =

The National Academic Games Project is the oldest continuously running program involving the Academic Games competitions in the United States. The earliest tournaments took place in the late 1960s on the campus of Nova High School in Davie, Florida. Nova was the beta test site for "Propaganda", and other games. Today, participating schools include Hancock County, West Virginia's Weir and Oak Glen middle and high schools; South Park, Pennsylvania schools; Suncrest Middle School and Morgantown High School, West Virginia schools; and many Michigan teams.

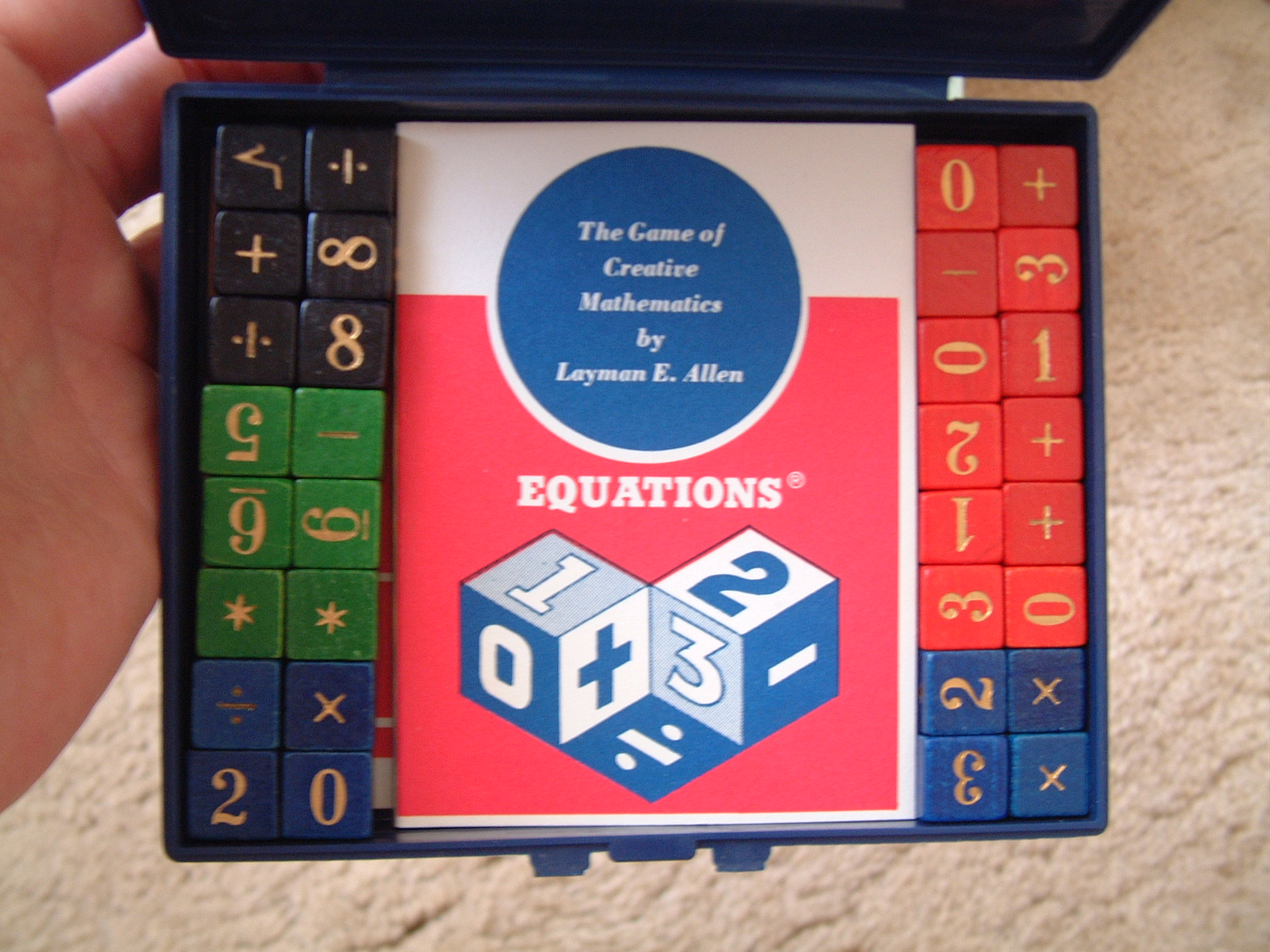
"Equations" an Academic Game by Layman E. Allen (circa 1969)

== Leaders ==
Robert (Bob) W. Allen was the founding father of The National Academic Games Project and what has become The National Academic Games Tournament. He and his brother, Professor Layman E. Allen of the University of Michigan, are the authors of the seven games that are played at the National Academic Games Tournament. Bob Allen is the author of The LinguiSHTIK Game, The Presidents’ Game (originally called “A Man called Mr. President”), World Card (originally called “Americard-Euorocard”), and the principal author of The Propaganda Game, while Layman Allen is the author of WFF 'N PROOF: The Game of Modern Logic, EQUATIONS: The Game of Creative Mathematics, and the principal author of ON-SETS: The Game of Set Theory.
