= Seinfeld (surname) =

Seinfeld is an Ashkenazi Jewish surname. Notable people with the surname include:

- Jerry Seinfeld (born 1954), American comedian and actor
  - Jerry Seinfeld (character), his character on the TV series
- Evan Seinfeld (born 1965), lead singer of Biohazard, second cousin of Jerry Seinfeld
- Jessica Seinfeld (born 1971), American author and philanthropist, wife of Jerry Seinfeld
- John H. Seinfeld (born 1942), American professor and scientist
- Natan Seinfeld (1860-1924), Polish politician
- Adam Szejnfeld (Polish pronunciation: [ˈadam ˈʂɛjnfɛlt]; born 1958), Polish politician
- Brenda Seinfeld, mother of American journalist Alison Kosik

== See also ==
- Seinfeld (disambiguation)
