= Academic Games =

- Predecessor: National Academic Games Project
- Formation: 1991
- Type: Non-Profit Organization
- Website: agloa.org

Academic Games is a competition in the U.S. in which players win by out-thinking each other in mathematics, language arts, and social studies. Formal tournaments are organized by local leagues, and on a national level by the Academic Games Leagues of America (AGLOA). Member leagues in eight states hold a national tournament every year, in which players in four divisions compete in eight different games covering math, English, and history. Some turn-based games require a kit consisting of a board and playing cubes, while other games have a central reader announcing questions or clues and each player answering individually.

== History ==
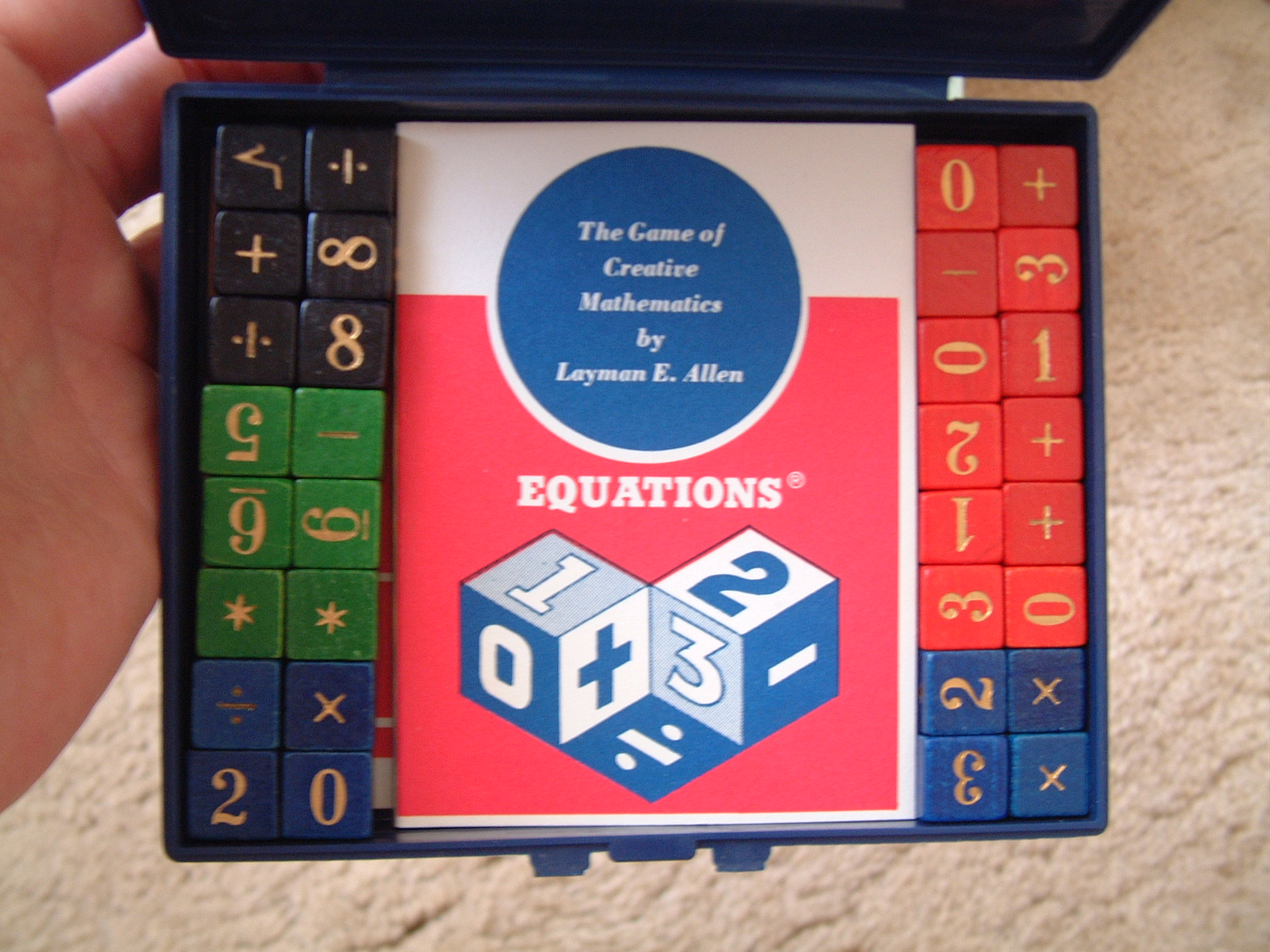
"Equations" by Layman E. Allen (circa 1969)

Before the existence of AGLOA, tournaments were held by the National Academic Games Project founded by the creator of many of the games. The earliest tournaments, in the late 1960s, were held on or near the campus of Nova High School in Davie, Florida. Nova was the beta test site for the game "Propaganda" and others. Many AGLOA leaders were involved with NAGP. The new league was created partially because of personal conflict with Robert W. Allen. Allen later sued the AGLOA for copyright, trademark, and tradename infringement.

Academic Games Leagues of America was founded in 1991 to encourage the use of Academic Games as an educational tool and as a scholar competition. Many of the games used in tournaments, however, were created as early as in the 1960s and 1970s. Most of the games played at tournaments are available from Wff 'N Proof Learning Games. Brother Neal Golden of New Orleans is the current board president of AGLOA; Rod Beard of West Bloomfield, MI is the current vice-president. Other board members represent Academic Games leagues in Florida, Georgia, Louisiana, Michigan, Pennsylvania, and West Virginia.

== Divisions ==
Academic Games players compete with other players in their own age group. These are the four age divisions in the league.

1. Minor - Grades 3-4 (Michigan Only)
2. Elementary – Grades 5-6 (Michigan) or 6 and under (States other than Michigan)
3. Middle – Grades 7–8
4. Junior – Grades 9–10
5. Senior – Grades 11–12

However, there is no restriction against playing one of your players in a higher division. Several teams have won national championships in the senior division, even though half their players belonged, agewise, in the junior division.

Games become more challenging as a player progresses through the divisions. There are often two variations of the games: basic and adventurous. Basic games have no variations or special demands players can make on game solutions. Adventurous games have a series of variation possibilities that may apply and increase in difficulty as players age.

== Games Played ==
Eight games are played in official AGLOA tournaments. Some local leagues also play other games such as On-Words (a simplified version of LinguiSHTIK).

=== Math Games ===
Two math games, Equations and On-Sets are played at AGLOA tournaments.

==== Equations ====
Equations is a mathematics game created in 1965 for 2–3 players. The game uses a playing mat with Forbidden, Permitted, and Required sections and 24 cubes, each labeled with numbers and mathematical operations. At the beginning of each "shake", one player uses up to six cubes to set a "goal." All players must use the remaining cubes to devise a solution that equals the goal or win by challenging an impossible board + goal situation.

Gameplay can become more complicated through the use of "variations" called on the game. Applicable variations differ by the player's age division. The game progresses with each player moving one cube on their turn, or alternatively challenging that they can create a solution with the cubes in play, that a solution was possible on the last turn and the player before had missed it, or challenging that it is impossible to create a solution with the cubes available. When a player calls a challenge, it is called against the player who most recently completed their move.

In a three player game, the indifferent player may choose who he sides with in the case of a challenge. A player who correctly challenges another player wins the game. The loser of a game gains two points, The winner six, and the sider (if he sided with the winner) gains four or two (if he sided with the loser). Equations games become more intricate with the use of factorials, vulgar fractions, and even logarithms, in the Senior division.

==== On-Sets ====
On-Sets is a board and cube game that teaches basic logic and set theory. This game also uses a deck of 16 cards that is used to make the "Universe". Each card contains a different combination of colored dots. The cubes contain numbers, colors and logic operators.

Players learn logic concepts such as union, intersection, empty set, complement and learn to use restrictions such as subset. Variations can also be used in On-Sets games. A player wins by using the cubes in resources to create a logical statement which equals the goal set using the numeral cubes. Challenges and multiplayer games work in a similar way to Equations game.

==== WFF 'N Proof ====
WFF 'N Proof is a board and cube game that was created by Professor Layman Allen in 1961 to teach the basics of symbolic logic. It is played with 28 cubes that contain various letters, such as p, q, C, N, A, K, E, s, r, o, and i. The game board contains a forbidden section, a permitted section, and a required section. To win the game, you have to write a proof, using the cubes to create "WFFs" (Well-Formed Formulas). This game was now adopted by AGLOA in 2013, however the game was dropped from the tournament after 2018.

=== Language Games ===
==== LinguiSHTIK ====
LinguiSHTIK is a technical game that teaches language arts and linguistics. The game has a playing mat and 23 cubes which are imprinted with the 26 letters of the alphabet.

A player has to create a word using the letters available, and the word must be used in a sentence that matches the Demands called. A demand specifies something about the sentence or word, such as number of clauses, part of speech, number of letters, etc. Challenges in LinguiSHTIK work similarly as in the other cube games with the exception of a forceout, which is called when moving any cube would result in a Challenge Win. Some concepts taught in LinguiSHTIK include sentence patterns, clauses, grammar, and verbs.

The game has elements similar to the popular word game Scrabble but adds a different element of play through grammatical demands and the shared letter pool.

==== Propaganda ====
In Propaganda, clues are read to all players by a central reader. Each player must decide, from a list, which persuasion technique that clue used, if any. There are several different sections of Propaganda techniques; the reader also specifies which section the persuasion technique is listed in.

Different leagues have different scoring methods, but the official AGLOA scoring involves a "bold" and "cautious" wager method. If you wager "bold", then you receive four points for a correct answer or lose two points for an incorrect answer. If you wager "cautious," then you receive two points for a correct answer; however, you lose nothing for an incorrect answer. A round consists of nine questions, so the highest score possible per round is 36 points, while the lowest is -18 points.

Most Propaganda clues involve statements that are likely to be heard in advertising or politics. There are six different Propaganda sections, but only four specific sections are used in each season. Sections A, B, D, and E are being used for the 2016–2017 season, and B, C, D, and F will be used for the 2017–2018 season. For 2018–2019, the sections will be A, C, D, and E. For 2019–2020, the sections will be A, B, C, and F. For 2020–2021, the sections will be B, C, D, and E. Here are all the Propaganda techniques, listed by section.

===== Propaganda Techniques =====
More complete definitions of the individual techniques can be found on agloa.org.

Section A	Section B	Section C	Section D	Section E	Section F
'Techniques of Self-Deception'	'Techniques of Language'	'Techniques of Irrelevance'	'Techniques of Exploitation'	'Techniques of Form'	'Techniques of Maneuver'
No Technique	No Technique	No Technique	No Technique	No Technique	No Technique
Prejudice	Emotional Terms	Appearance	Appeal To Pity	Concurrency	Diversion
Academic Detachment	Metaphor/Simile	Manner	Appeal to Flattery	Post Hoc	Disproving a Minor Point
Drawing the Line	Emphasis	Degrees and Titles	Appeal to Ridicule	Selected Instances	Ad Hominem
Not Drawing the Line	Quotation out of Context	Numbers	Appeal to Prestige	Hasty Generalization	Appeal to Ignorance
Conservatism, Radicalism, Moderatism	Abstract Terms	Status	Appeal to Prejudice	Faulty Analogy	Leading Question
Rationalization	Vagueness	Repetition	Bargain Appeal	Composition	Complex Question
Wishful Thinking	Ambiguity	Slogans	Folksy Appeal	Division	Inconsequent Argument
Tabloid Thinking	Shift of Meaning	Technical Jargon	Join the Bandwagon Appeal	Non-Sequitur	Attacking a Straw Man
Causal Oversimplification	—	Sophistical Formula	Appeal to Practical Consequences	—	Victory By Definition
Inconceivability		—	Passing from the Acceptable to the Dubious	—	Begging the Question

=== Social Studies Games ===
==== Presidents ====
A reader announces three clues about a particular U.S. President. Each player must individually write down which President the clue describes. Players who answer correctly on the earliest clue get more points than players that answer after more clues are given. The first clue is worth 6 points, the second is worth 4 points, and the third is worth 2 points. The 6 point clue is the hardest clue, while the 4 point and 2 point clues get progressively easier.

In the Elementary and Middle divisions, only a portion of presidents are used per season. For those divisions, ranges switch between presidents 1–17, 16-33, and 28–46 every year. In Junior and Senior divisions, however, two ranges of presidents are used every season. During a tournament, players are assisted by a gazetteer which has each president's name, birth date, birthplace, and other basic information.

==== World Events ====
This event was part of the national tournament through 2016, after which its two rounds, Current Events and Theme, were each made an independent game.

This game was originally known as “World Card.”

==== Current Events ====
This event concerns events from the past year, both foreign and domestic. It consists of a Wager Round, in which the players choose how many points they wish to wager, and a Lightning Round, in which the point values for each question are determined before the round.

In the Wager Round, players may wager two, four, or six points after being given a broad category (such as “international politics” or “arts and entertainment”). The player need not have any points to wager; thus, negative scores are possible. After the wager is made, the question is asked and the players answer. A correct answer earns as many points as were wagered, while an incorrect answer loses half that many.

In the Lightning Round, the questions are assigned point values (two, four, or six, with six questions of each value) by a panel of judges before the game starts. The questions are asked rapidly, and a correct answer earns its value; however, unlike the Wager Round, there is no penalty for answering incorrectly.

In August 2025, the AGLOA Board voted to change the format of current events and theme to remove the wager round in the Elementary division. According to the new rules, there will be two consecutive lightning rounds played with the same rules.

==== Theme ====
This event is very similar to its sister game, Current Events, which was once also a round of World Events. It is played and scored in the same fashion, with a Wager Round followed by a Lightning Round (Excluding Elementary Division as of 2025) The only notable difference is that this game concerns historical facts related to a theme chosen at the national tournament two years prior. Examples of past themes include the 1970s, the history of NASA, the Mesoamerican civilizations (Aztecs, Incas, Mayas), World War I, and the American Civil War.

The theme of the 2017–2018 season was Greek and Roman Mythology, which was chosen by vote at the 2015–2016 tournament. The theme of the 2018–2019 season was “50 Women Who Changed the World,” which included Rosa Parks, Sacagawea, and Jane Addams The theme of the 2019 - 2020 season is "The Supreme Court: Now and Then".

=== Terminology ===
Academic Games tournament has a lot of jargons. Here are some of the most common AG-related words and their meanings.

- Challenge Win or Now – A player calls Challenge Win when he can create a solution using the cubes in play, and optionally one more cube from resources. It can also be called C-A-flub or A-flub in classic version.
- Challenge Impossible or Never – Challenge Impossible is called when a player believes it is impossible to create a solution, because of a previous player's move. The player it was called against must try to create a solution, and show that there was a correct solution possible. In classic version, it is called a P-flub.
- Cube Game - Equations, LinguiSHTIK, On-Sets, and WFF 'N PROOF are categorized as cube games, being board games involving cubes in one way or another.
- Demand – A LinguiSHTIK demand can be called by stating the name of the demand and placing a green or black cube in the "Demands" section of the playing mat. The word and sentence in a player's solution must meet all demands called in that shake.
- Force Out – In the case that a game is not finished within the time limit, or that no possible moves can be made that would not create a "Now" or "Never" situation, the game goes into a force out. During a force out, players are given two minutes to create a solution. Players with a correct solution earn a 4, and the ones with an incorrect solution receive a 2, or the minimum possible for that round.
- Goal – Equations, On-Sets, and WFF 'N Proof require the first player to use cubes from resources to set a goal. This is what players try to achieve a solution to throughout the shake.
- Reading Game - Propaganda, Presidents, Current Events, and Theme are considered reading games, with a reader asking a question and players answering on a scoresheet.
- Resources – Resources are the cubes that are rolled at the beginning of each shake.
- Shake – One match of a cube game is called a shake. A shake can last anywhere from a few minutes to an hour depending on the cubes rolled and the players involved.
- Shake-off - In competition, cube games such as Equations, LinguiSHTIK, and On-Sets may have shake-offs to guarantee a winner, especially between those who have perfect scores.
- Solution – A player uses the cubes in resources to create a solution that equals the goal. A solution must be written on paper. After a solution is presented, other players check that solution.
- Stall – As a courtesy, players say the word "stall" before flipping the one-minute timer during their opponents turn. Most actions in the games have a time limit, ranging from 15 seconds to three minutes. Surpassing the time limit usually carries a small penalty of one point.
- Universe – At the beginning of an On-Sets shake, one player randomly lays out between six and fourteen unique cards containing colored dots. This collection of cards is called the universe.
- Variation – In Equations and On-Sets, players can call a total of three variations that affect that shake, or six in the Senior division. Variations are intended to make the game more interesting and more challenging for experienced players. Some examples of variations are "wilds" where one cube can represent another cube, "upside down", where an upside down number is interpreted as the number's additive inverse, etc.

== National tournaments ==
- 2026: Charlotte, North Carolina
- 2025: Arlington, Virginia
- 2024: Atlanta, Georgia
- 2023: Orlando, Florida
- 2022: Knoxville, Tennessee
- 2021: Wheeling, West Virginia (Not attended)
- 2020: Atlanta, Georgia (Not attended)
- 2019: Orlando, Florida
- 2018: Knoxville, Tennessee
- 2017: Wheeling, West Virginia
- 2016: Atlanta, Georgia
- 2015: Orlando, Florida
- 2014: Knoxville, Tennessee
- 2013: Charlotte, North Carolina
- 2012: Wheeling, West Virginia
- 2011: Kissimmee, Florida
- 2010: Cincinnati, Ohio
- 2009: Knoxville, Tennessee
- 2008: Kissimmee, Florida
- 2007: Wheeling, West Virginia
- 2006: Charlotte, North Carolina
- 2005: Baton Rouge, Louisiana
- 2004: Orlando, Florida
- 2003: Wheeling, West Virginia
- 2002: Charlotte, North Carolina
- 2001: Baton Rouge, Louisiana
- 2000: Orlando, Florida
- 1999: Wheeling, West Virginia

== See also ==
- Academic Challenge (Ohio)
- Commissioner's Academic Challenge (Florida)
- Academic Pentathlon
- Quizbowl
- Reach for the Top
- MathCounts
- Academic Decathlon
