= Preprocessing =

Preprocessing may refer to the following topics in computer science:

- Preprocessor, a program that processes its input data to produce output that is used as input to another program like a compiler
- Data preprocessing, used in machine learning and data mining to make input data easier to work with
