= Tabletop game industry =

Economic sector

The tabletop game industry is the economic sector involved in the development, marketing, and monetization of games that fall within the scope of tabletop games, which includes dice and card games. According to Statista, the tabletop game industry had an estimated market of approximately 7.2 billion U.S. dollars in 2017 and is expected to increase by 4.8 billion U.S. dollars within the next 6 years.

Since most of the game play requires offline meetings players may choose to participate via meetups or through a variety of tabletop exhibitions held around the world, which are supported by both game designers and players. Some individuals involved in the tabletop industry focus on collecting valuable game cards, games, or pieces, as they see the value of cards as far higher that its original production and sales cost. This mixture of individuals makes up a market structure that can give the board game market a variety of opportunities.

== Classification of games ==
Tabletop games are occasionally referred to as board games, but are not limited to games that require a game board to play. These games are typically based on strategy, randomness, or a combination of both. Games that are traditionally described as tabletop games includes board games, card games, dice games, paper and pencil games, tabletop role-playing games, strategy games, and tile-based games.

These types of games typically include chessboards, game pieces, figurines, cards, dice, and a variety of other accessories that vary according to the complexity of the game involved. Chess is frequently cited as a classic example of a two-player board game. Desktop games can be oriented to one or more people at the same time and the number of players varies depending on the size and rules of the game.

== Process ==
According to author and game inventor Brian Tinsman, the average tabletop game company does not create their own games but instead purchase or license them from independent inventors. These inventors will pitch their games to potential buyers after coming up with a game idea and running the prototype through several test groups and revisions. If the pitch is successful the game will be run through a publisher's art department, which will work on the game's art and graphic design while the game is refined and made ready for the production team, who will select the physical game materials and prep artwork to be run through the machines used to print the game. After this the game is typically sent to distributors, who will sell the game to mass market retailers and specialty/hobby shops. If a publisher is very large they may choose to distribute the games without using a distributor. Many North American companies use factories in China to produce their games, which can make tariffs or laws on Chinese imports of great importance to companies.

Tinsman states that for game inventors there are four major markets for tabletop games: mass market, hobby games, American specialty games, and European games. Mass market games are ones marketed to the general public, whereas hobby games are aimed at a more specific market and mostly fall into three categories: role-playing games, miniatures games, and trading card games. American specialty games are made up of games that would not fall into the prior two categories while the European game market is primarily made up of games put out by German companies, most of which are not translated into English or brought over to the United States.

== Select vendors ==
There are thousands of board game publishers around the world, here is a selection of a few of the largest.

=== Asmodee Editions (Group) ===
Asmodee is a French publisher of board games, card games and role-playing games that was founded in 1995. As of 2019 the company has 11 development studios, 11 distribution business units, and over 750 employees worldwide. Tabletop games released by Asmodee include Catan, Star Wars: X-Wing, Ticket to Ride, Arkham Horror and Pandemic.

=== Hasbro ===
Hasbro is a global play and entertainment company that has its corporate headquarters in Pawtucket, Rhode Island. The majority of its products are manufactured in East Asia. Products released by Hasbro include Monopoly, Magic: The Gathering, and the Dungeons & Dragons series.

=== Mattel ===
Mattel is an American multinational toy manufacturing company founded in 1945 with headquarters in El Segundo, California.

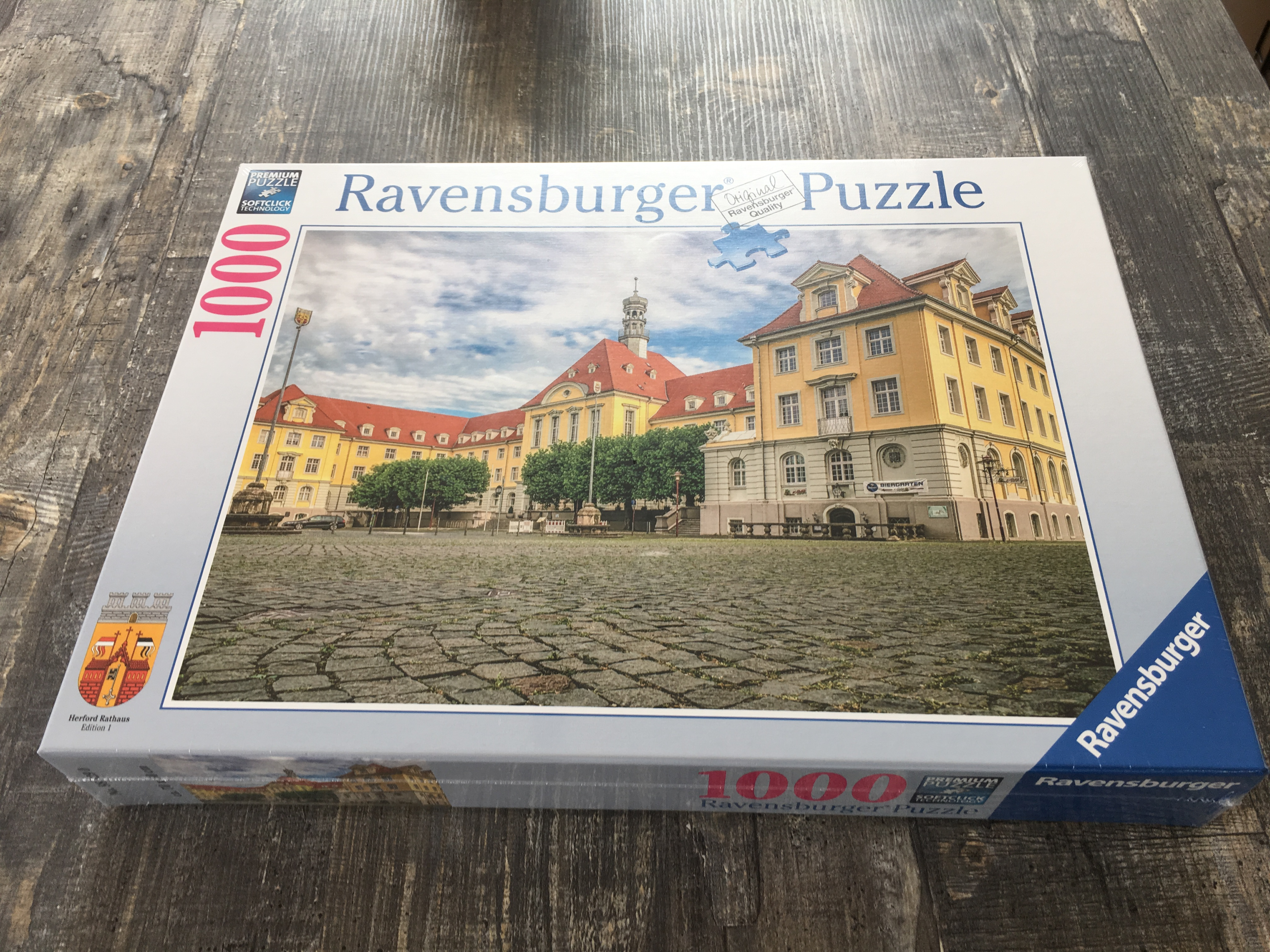

=== Ravensburger ===
Ravensburger AG is a German game and toy company and publishing house. The company is known for games such as their puzzles games series.

== Board games ==
A board game is a tabletop game that involves counters or pieces moved or placed on a pre-marked surface or "board", according to a set of rules. Some games are based on pure strategy, but many contain an element of chance; and some are purely chance, with no element of skill.

While the board gaming market is estimated to be smaller than that for video games, it has also experienced significant growth from the late 1990s. A 2012 article in The Guardian described board games as "making a comeback". Another from 2014 gave an estimate that put the growth of the board game market at "between 25% and 40% annually" since 2010, and described the current time as the "golden era for board games". The rise in board game popularity has been attributed to quality improvement (more elegant mechanics, components, artwork, and graphics) as well as increased availability thanks to sales through the Internet.

A 1991 estimate for the global board game market was over $1.2 billion. A 2001 estimate for the United States "board games and puzzle" market gave a value of under $400 million, and for United Kingdom, of about £50 million. A 2009 estimate for the Korean market was put at 800 million won, and another estimate for the American board game market for the same year was at about $800 million. A 2011 estimate for the Chinese board game market was at over 10 billion yuan. (Some estimates may split board games from collectible card, miniature and role-playing games; for example another 2014 estimate distinguishing board games from other types of hobby games gave the estimate for the U.S. and Canada market at only $75 million, with the total size of what it defined as the hobby game market at over $700 million, with a 2015 estimate suggesting a value of almost $900 million) A 2013 estimate put the size of the German toy market at 2.7 billion euros (out of which, the board games and puzzle market is worth about 375 million euros), and Polish markets, at 2 billion and 280 million zlotys, respectively. Per capita, in 2009 Germany was considered to be the best market, with the highest number of games sold per individual.

== Gaming conventions ==
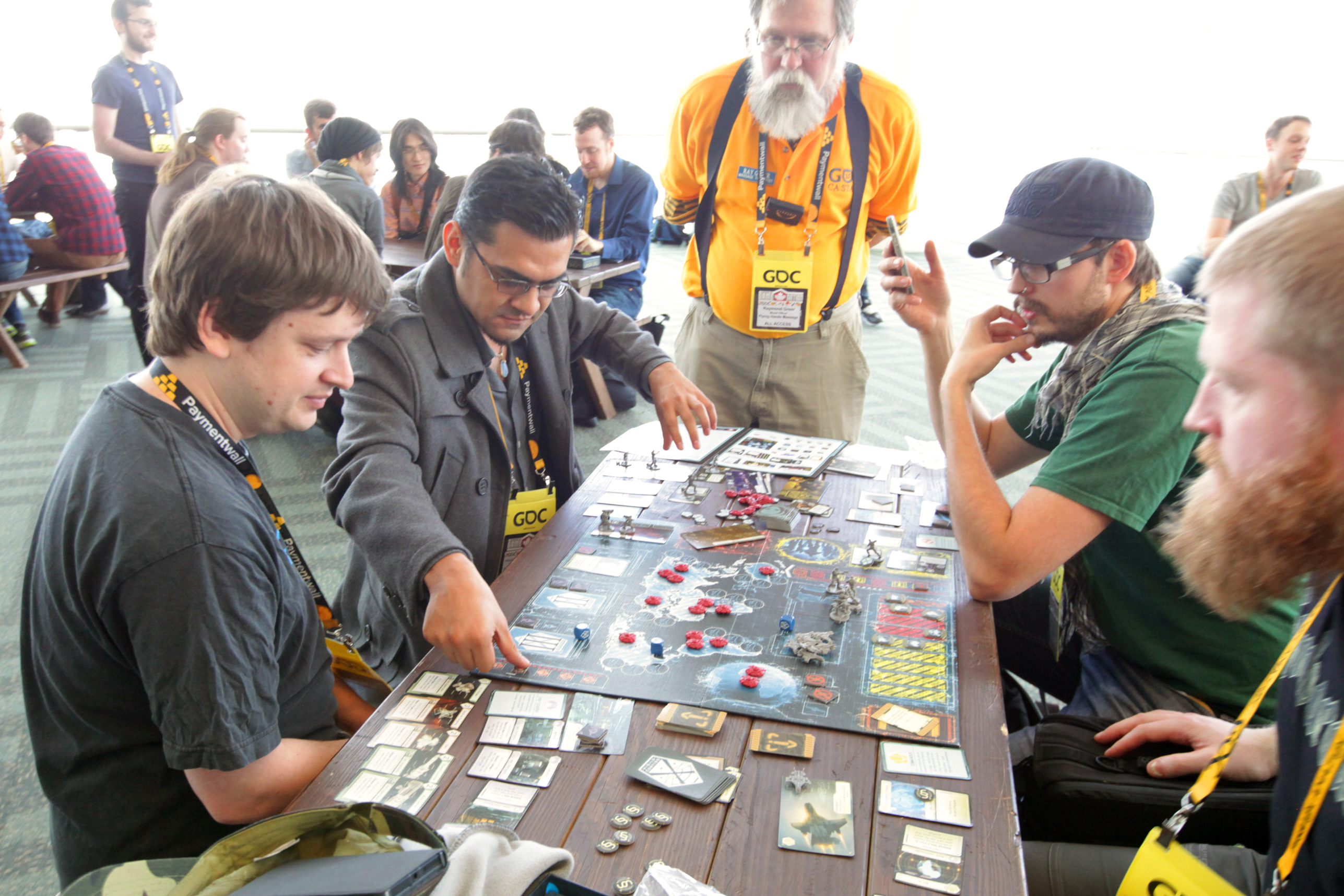

Gaming conventions are large gatherings centered on various types of games, which can include tabletop games. These conventions can range in size from small single day exhibitions to large multi-day events. Tabletop gaming conventions typically provide venues for players to conduct exhibitor activities or test board games that have not yet been released. Game conventions can often be divided into two categories: small conventions or large conventions. Small conventions are most frequently attended by local people and have between 200 and 5,000 attendees. They are often focused on bringing people together to play games and can lack showrooms. Large conventions can draw attendees from all over the country or globe and can accommodate between 15,000 and 200,000 people. There are several hundred gaming conventions around the world each year.

Conventions typically have a dealer's room or hall where attendees can purchase games from sellers. Attendees can also purchase directly from the publisher, a feature that is most common at larger conventions. Some conventions also feature a large event hall where participants can sign up to play specific games or participate in competitions.

=== Select tabletop gaming conventions ===
- BGG CON (& BGG SPRING) in Dallas, TX
- Spiel in Essen, Germany
- Gen Con in Indianapolis, Indiana
- Hellana Games - Festival of Games and History in Agliana, Italy
- Lucca Comics & Games in Lucca, Italy
- PAX Unplugged in Philadelphia, PA
- Origins Game Fair in Columbus, OH
- UK Games Expo in Birmingham, UK
