= Nova High School =

Public high school in Davie, Florida, United States

Coordinates: 26.0759°N 80.2372°W

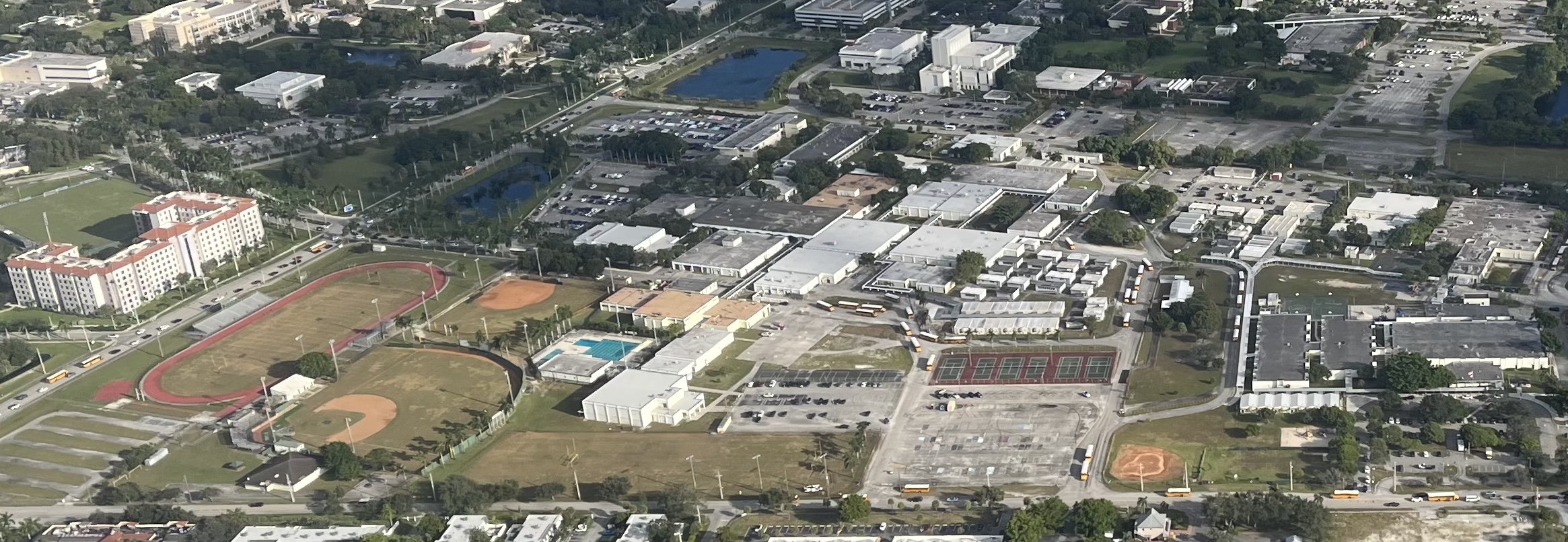
- Aerial view, October 2023

Location
- 3600 College Avenue; Davie, Florida 33314; United States

Information
- School type: Public high school Public Secondary
- Motto: We do the right thing
- Established: 1960
- Founder: Ford
- School board: BCPS
- School district: Broward County Public Schools
- Superintendent: Dr. Peter B. Licata
- School number: 1281
- School code: 1281
- Principal: Olayemi Awofadeju
- Head of school: Olayemi Awofadeju
- Staff: approx. 110
- Faculty: largest number of National Board certified teachers in the district
- Teaching staff: 89.53 (FTE)
- Grades: 9-12
- Age range: 14–19
- Classes: block schedule classes #1-4 on green day and classes #5-8 on gold day
- Average class size: 23
- Student to teacher ratio: 25.19
- Classes offered: All Advanced Placement classes plus elective and core classes
- Language: English
- Campus size: Current holding of 5,000 students daily
- Campus type: Suburban
- Colors: Green & gold
- Slogan: At Nova, we do the right thing.
- Athletics: Pat McQuaid
- Athletics conference: Broward County Athletic Association (District 5A)
- Sports: All FHSAA Sports
- Mascot: Titan & NT
- Team name: Titans
- Rival: St. Thomas Aquinas High School Western High School
- National ranking: 527
- Newspaper: Titan Times
- Yearbook: Olympian
- Feeder schools: Nova Middle School
- Affiliation: FHSAA
- Debate Coach: Jose Denis
- Student Government Association Sponsor (SGA): Taha Malik
- Athletic Director: Jason Hively
- Drama Director: D. Preston
- Director of Bands: Corey Jones
- Website: novahigh.browardschools.com

Nova High School is a public high school located in Davie, Florida, United States, and is part of the Broward County Public Schools district. It is one of four schools that comprise the Nova Center for Applied Research and Professional Development, the others being Nova Eisenhower Elementary School, Nova Blanche Forman Elementary School, and Nova Middle School. Nova Eisenhower Elementary, the newest of the three lower schools, began in downtown Fort Lauderdale, in the old Fort Lauderdale High School building, while the current facility was being built in Davie.

The Nova campus is located within the South Florida Education Center, a consortium of area institutions which include the main campuses of Nova Southeastern University, Broward College, and the McFatter Technical Center as well as regional campuses of the University of Florida and Florida Atlantic University. The school has been named a Blue Ribbon School of Excellence, and has earned a FCAT school grade of "A" every year since 1999 and only one "B" grade in the 2002–2003 year.

== History ==
Nova High School was established in 1960 and opened in September 1963 as a joint project between the Broward County Public Schools and the Ford Foundation. Known as the Nova Educational Experiment, the project aimed to create a community of schools spanning elementary to university level education in one location. Forman Field, the 545-acre site of a vacated naval aviation facility and located in the then rural areas of Broward County was chosen as the site for the project.

The Nova schools were originally jointly funded by the Ford Foundation and local sources, and were known for their progressive curricula and use of experimental teaching methods. Students were required to pass an entrance exam for acceptance and a lengthy waiting list often existed for potential students. The school year consisted of eleven months of instruction, with a one-month summer break.

Nova was the beta testing site for "Propaganda" and a number of other academic games. The earliest national academic games tournaments were held on the Nova campus during the late 1960s.

After the Nova Educational Experiment ended in the 1970s, the Ford Foundation departed, and total control of the Nova schools reverted to the Broward County Public Schools. Entrance requirements were relaxed in 1985; placement on a waiting list for entry into the schools still was required.

Nova High School was ranked as the 237th best public high school in the United States and 36th best in Florida by Newsweek in 2007, and it is listed as a Silver Medal School by the U.S. News & World Report in 2008, placing it within the top 3% of all high schools in the U.S.

== Demographics and statistics ==
As of the 2021–22 school year, the total student enrollment was 2,279. The ethnic makeup of the school was 31.6% White, 59% Black, 21.6% Hispanic, 5% Asian, 3.2% multiracial, 0.9% Native American or Native Alaskan, and 0.3% Native Hawaiian or Pacific Islander.

Nova High School was awarded a grade of "A" by the Florida Department of Education in 2002–2003 and 2004–2013. On the 2007 norm-referenced Florida Comprehensive Assessment Test (FCAT), Nova students performed nationally at the 75th percentile in reading and 82nd percentile in math. Nova faculty have, on average, 12 years of teaching experience and 49% hold advanced degrees. Average class size is 25, and the student stability rate is 97%.

=== County-sanctioned athletic programs ===
- Basketball (Boys' and Girls')
- Baseball (Boys')
- Bowling
- Cross Country (Boys' and Girls')
- Diving (Boys' and Girls')
- American football (Boys')
- Flag football (Girls')
- Soccer (Boys' and Girls')
- Swimming (sport) (Boys' and Girls')
- Diving (sport) (Boys' and Girls')
- Track and Field (Boys' and Girls')
- Tennis (Boys' and Girls')
- Softball (Girls')
- Volleyball (Boys' and Girls')
- Wrestling (Boys')
- Water Polo (Boys' and Girls')
- Golf Team (Boys' and Girls')
- Step Team (Boys' and Girls')
- Cheerleading

=== Debate team ===
Members of the Nova High School speech and debate team have won nine National Championships since the year 2000: Jeff Hannan in Student Congress (2000), Scott Jacobson in Student Congress (2002), Matt Futch in Student Congress (2004), Allison Pena in Extemp Commentary (2007), Jared Odessky in Domestic Extemporaneous Speaking and Jamaque Newberry in Dramatic Interpretation (2011), Gregory Bernstein in Congressional Debate (2013), Craig Heyne in Prose Reading (2016), and the team of Cornelia Fraser and Rafey Khan in Public Forum Debate (2017).

== Notable alumni ==
=== Entertainment ===
- Jeff Garlin, Class of 1980, comedian and actor/producer of Curb Your Enthusiasm, star of The Goldbergs
- Paige O'Hara, voice of Belle from Beauty and the Beast
- Scott Storch, Grammy Award–winning music producer
- Uffie (Anna-Catherine Hartley), electro music artist
- Justin D. Jacobson, Class of 1988, game designer and publisher
- David Bianculli, Class of 1971, television critic for National Public Radio
- Corinne Kaplan, Survivor contestant on Survivor: Gabon and Survivor: Caramoan

=== News ===
- Glenn Greenwald, Class of 1985, journalist and author
- Alison Kosik, CNN business correspondent
- Marie Murray Martin, Class of 1981, founder of the Elberta Arts Center and education writer
- Cary Tennis, Class of 1971, writer for Salon.com

=== Athletics ===
Football

- Autry Denson, Class of 1995, running back, all-time rushing yards leader at University of Notre Dame; running backs coach
- Tyrus McCloud, Class of 1993 – linebacker, NFL player
- Chris Gamble, cornerback, Carolina Panthers (2004–2012)
- Omar Smith, center, New York Giants (2002–2004)

Baseball

- Harry Chappas, MLB shortstop with Chicago White Sox (1978–1980)
- Jeff Fiorentino, MLB outfielder with Baltimore Orioles (2005–2006, 2009) and Oakland Athletics (2008)
- Doug Johns, MLB pitcher with Oakland Athletics (1995–1996) and Baltimore Orioles (1998–1999)
- Tyler Kinley, MLB pitcher with the Miami Marlins (2013-2018), the Minnesota Twins (2018), another stint with the Marlins, (2019) and active player on the Colorado Rockies.
- Mike Morse, Class of 2000, MLB outfielder/first baseman with several teams
- Anthony Swarzak, MLB pitcher with several teams

Basketball

- Mickey Dillard, NBA player for Cleveland Cavaliers (1981–1982); played collegiately at Florida State University
- Jim Thomas, played in NBA for Indiana Pacers (1983–1985), Los Angeles Clippers (1985–1986) and Minnesota Timberwolves (1990–1991); played collegiately at the University of Indiana

Soccer

- Cory Gibbs, professional soccer player for several teams and the U.S. national team

=== Other ===
- Robert F. Coleman, professor of mathematics at the University of California, Berkeley
- Nathan Connolly, Class of 1995, historian. Herbert Baxter Adams Associate Professor of History at Johns Hopkins University
- Chesley V. Morton, Class of 1969, Georgia House of Representatives 1983–1991
- Kevyn D. Orr, Class of 1979, City of Detroit emergency financial manager
- Brian A. Skiff, Class of 1973, noted astronomer at Lowell Observatory in Flagstaff, Arizona
- Ben Stark, Class of 2001, Hall of Fame player for Magic: The Gathering
