= Seinfeld (disambiguation) =

Seinfeld is an American television sitcom.

Seinfeld may also refer to:

- Seinfeld (surname)
  - Jerry Seinfeld (born 1954), American comedian, actor and star of Seinfeld
    - Jerry Seinfeld (character), his character on the TV series
- "Seinfeld" (Curb Your Enthusiasm), an episode of Curb Your Enthusiasm
