= WFF 'N PROOF =

Game of symbolic logic

WFF 'N PROOF is a game of modern logic, developed to teach principles of symbolic logic. It was developed in 1962 by Layman E. Allen, a former professor of Yale Law School and the University of Michigan.

== Rules ==
As marketed in the 1960s WFF 'N PROOF was a series of 20 games of increasing complexity, varying with the logical rules and methods available.

All players must be able to recognize a "well-formed formula" (WFF in Łukasiewicz notation), to assemble dice values into valid statements (WFFs) and to apply the rules of logical inference so as to complete a proof. Games are played by two or more people. The first player to roll the cubes sets a WFF as a Goal. Each player then tries to construct (with whatever is available) a complete logical proof of the goal. The Solution to the goal is the Premises with which they started their proof, and the Rules they used to get to the Goal.

Players take turns moving to the Essentials, Permitted Premises, or Permitted Rules sections of the mat. Any cube moved to Essentials must be used in any Solution, and must be an essential part of that solution; any cube value in Permitted Premises may be used as part of a premise; any cube value in Permitted Rules may be used as part of a Rule. Thus the players themselves shape the Solution, forcing one another to create new Solutions in response to moves.

At any point a player may challenge the last mover, if they feel the last mover has made a mistake. There are three types of Challenges. A-Flub means that the Challenger can make a Solution using the cubes in Required and Permitted and one more cube from Resources. P-Flub, or Challenge Impossible means the player believes the Mover cannot make a Solution using the cubes in Required, Permitted, and Resources. C-A-Flub means that the Challenger believes that the Mover, or some previous mover, missed an A-Flub. After a challenge, at least one player must show a correct Solution on paper.

The scoring goes like this:

The player who wins the challenge scores 10 points.
The loser of the challenge scores 6.
If there is a third player, he must side with or against the Challenger and scores points depending upon that decision.

== Name ==
The name is a play on Whiffenpoofs, an a cappella singing group established at Yale University in 1909.

== Reviews ==
- Games & Puzzles

== See also ==
- Academic Games
