= David Bianculli =

American journalist

- Born: 1953 or 1954 (age 71–72); Pittsburgh, Pennsylvania, U.S.
- Education: University of Florida, B.S., M.A.
- Occupations: Television critic; author; academic
- Years active: 1975–present
- Website: tvworthwatching.com

David Bianculli (born 1953 or 1954) is an American TV critic, columnist, radio personality, non-fiction author and university professor. Bianculli has served as the television critic for NPR's radio show Fresh Air since the Philadelphia-based show went national in 1987, and often fills in for the show's host, Terry Gross. He was the founder and editor-in-chief of the website TVWorthWatching.com, and is an associate professor of TV and film history at Rowan University in Glassboro, New Jersey.

== Early life and education ==
Bianculli showed an early interest in television, even making notes about TV shows in his childhood diary. A graduate of Nova High School in Fort Lauderdale, Florida, Bianculli received a B.S. in journalism from the University of Florida in 1975 and an M.A. in Journalism and Communication from the University of Florida in 1977. In 1995, Bianculli was named an Alumnus of Distinction by UF's College of Journalism and Communications.

== Career ==
While attending the University of Florida in Gainesville, Bianculli convinced an editor at the Gainesville Sun to let him "write a review of a brand-new TV show aimed at college kids, since I was a college kid and Gainesville was a college town." That show was Saturday Night Live. Bianculli continued writing television reviews for the Sun, at $5 per review, while completing his master's degree.

Bianculli worked as a TV critic for the Ft. Lauderdale News/Sun Sentinel from 1977 to 1980, which was followed by stints at the Akron Beacon Journal (1980–1983) and The Philadelphia Inquirer (1983–1987). In 1987, he was named TV critic for the New York Post, then jumped to the rival New York Daily News, where he remained from 1993 to 2007. Bianculli also briefly served as TV critic for the TV trade magazine Broadcasting & Cable.

On November 5, 2007, the day his farewell column ran in the New York Daily News, Bianculli launched his web magazine, TVWorthWatching.com, becoming its editor. The website was updated with news and columns until 2021.

Bianculli is the author of four books, Teleliteracy: Taking Television Seriously; Dictionary of Teleliteracy: Television's 500 Biggest Hits, Misses, and Events; Dangerously Funny: The Uncensored Story of 'The Smothers Brothers Comedy Hour', a history of the Smothers Brothers television variety show; and The Platinum Age of Television: From I Love Lucy to The Walking Dead, How TV Became Terrific. In 2011, Smokehouse Pictures, the production company owned by George Clooney and Grant Heslov, and Sony Pictures optioned the rights to Dangerously Funny.

Bianculli sits on the Advisory Council for the Fred Rogers Center for Early Learning and Children's Media at Saint Vincent College, Latrobe, PA. He is a member of the Broadcast Television Journalists Association and a founding member of the Television Critics Association.

In 2013, the website Complex included Bianculli in its list of "The 25 Best TV Bloggers Right Now".

Bianculli has been a resident of Cherry Hill, New Jersey, since 1987.

== Books ==
- The Platinum Age of Television: From I Love Lucy to The Walking Dead, How TV Became Terrific. New York: Anchor Books, 2016. Paperback: ISBN 978-1-101-91132-7; eBook: ISBN 978-0-385-54028-5.
- Dangerously Funny: The Uncensored Story of "The Smothers Brothers Comedy Hour". New York: Touchstone/Simon & Schuster, 2009. Hardback: ISBN 1439101167; Paperback: ISBN 1439101175.
- Dictionary of Teleliteracy: Television's 500 Biggest Hits, Misses, and Events. New York: Continuum Publishing Co., 1996; Syracuse: Syracuse University Press, paperback, 1997. Hardback: ISBN 0826405770; Paperback: ISBN 0815605056.
- Teleliteracy: Taking Television Seriously. New York: Continuum Publishing Co., 1992. Touchstone/Simon & Schuster, paperback, 1994. Hardback: ISBN 0826405355; Paperback: ISBN 0671882384.

Bianculli has also contributed articles or chapters to various publications. They include:

- "Twin Peaks" in The Essential Cult TV Reader. David Lavery, ed. Lexington, KY: University of Kentucky Press, 2010. ISBN 0813125685.
- "Quality TV: A U.S. TV Critic's Perspective" in Reading Quality TV: American Television and Beyond. Janet McCabe and Kim Akass, eds. London: I.B. Tauris & Co., 2007. Hardback: ISBN 1845115104 Paperback: ISBN 1845115112.
- "The CSI Phenomenon" in Reading CSI: Crime Television Under the Microscope. Michael Allen, ed. London: I.B. Tauris & Co., 2007. Paperback: ISBN 1845114280.
- "The Myth, the Man, the Legend," in Mister Rogers' Neighborhood: Children, Television, and Fred Rogers. Mark Collins and Margaret Mary Kimmel, eds. Pittsburgh: University of Pittsburgh Press, 1996. Hardback: ISBN 0822939215 Paperback: ISBN 0822956527.
- "The Theory of Evolution, According to Vonnegut (A Review of Galapagos)," in The Critical Response to Kurt Vonnegut. Leonard Mustazza, ed. Westport, Conn.: Greenwood Press, 1994. ISBN 0313286345.
