= Star Wars: X-Wing Miniatures Game =

2012 miniature war game by Jay Little

- Manufacturers: Fantasy Flight Games
- Designers: Jay (The Man) Little
- Publishers: Christian T. Peterson
- Publication: August 17, 2012
- Years active: 2012 to 2018
- Genres: Miniature wargame
- Players: 2+
- Playing time: 45-90 Minutes
- Chance: Medium (Dice Rolling)
- Age range: 14+
- Website: http://www.fantasyflightgames.com/
- Awards: 2012 Charles S. Roberts Best Science-Fiction or Fantasy Board Wargame; 2012 Jocul Anului în România Beginners; 2013 UK Games Expo Best Miniatures Range; 2013 Golden Geek Best 2-Player Board Game 2013 As d'Or - Jeu de l'Année Prix du Jury

Star Wars: X-Wing is a miniature war game designed by Jay Little and produced by Fantasy Flight Games that was released at Gen Con during August 17, 2012. It features tactical ship-to-ship dogfighting between various types of starfighters set in the fictional Star Wars universe. The game is said to be easy to learn and quick to play taking anywhere between 15 and 60 minutes from first set-up to battle's end. Each round both players give all their ships movement orders without knowing what their opponent is doing before resolving these orders while trying to shoot down enemy craft. On May 1, 2018, FFG announced X-Wing Second Edition, to be released on September 13, 2018. Although the physical models are transferable, an entire new set of rules, templates, and markers have been produced and are available through a new core set, waves, and conversion packs.

== First Edition Core game ==
The core set, which is required to play the game, includes one X-wing fighter miniature and two TIE fighter miniatures. The original core set uses X-wing and TIE fighter miniatures and pilots based on the original trilogy. A second edition of the core set with updated rules was released in 2015 as part of the promotion for Star Wars: The Force Awakens, featuring updated X-wing and TIE fighter miniatures and pilots from that movie. The Force Awakens Core Set also introduces sub-factions: The Resistance, a sub-faction of the Rebels and compatible with any Rebel ships, and the First Order, a sub-faction of the Imperials.

Rebel Pilot cards	Imperial Pilot cards	Upgrade cards:
Luke Skywalker	"Mauler Mithel"	Proton Torpedoes
Biggs Darklighter	"Dark Curse"	R2-D2
Red Squadron Pilot	"Night Beast"	R2-F2
Rookie Pilot	Black Squadron Pilot (x2)	Determination
	Obsidian Squadron Pilot (x2)	Marksmanship
	Academy Pilot (x2)	

Rebel Pilot cards	Imperial Pilot cards	Upgrade cards:
Poe Dameron	"Omega Ace"	Proton Torpedoes
"Blue Ace"	"Epsilon Leader"	BB-8
Red Squadron Veteran	"Zeta Ace"	R5-X3
Blue Squadron Novice	Omega Squadron Pilot (x2)	Wired
	Zeta Squadron Pilot (x2)	Weapons Guidance
	Epsilon Pilot (x2)	

== First Edition Expansions ==
=== Wave 1 ===
Released Date: September 14, 2012

==== X-Wing Expansion Pack ====
Pilot Cards	Torpedoes	Astromech Droids	Elite Pilot Talent Cards
•Wedge Antilles	Proton Torpedoes	•R5-K6	Expert Handling
•Garven Dreis		R5 Astromech	Marksmanship
Red Squadron Pilot			
Rookie Pilot			

==== TIE Fighter Expansion Pack ====
Pilot Cards	Elite Pilot Talent
•"Howlrunner"	Determination
•"Backstabber"	Swarm Tactics
•"Winged Gundark"	
Black Squadron Pilot	
Obsidian Squadron Pilot	
Academy Pilot	

==== Y-Wing Expansion Pack ====
Pilot Cards	Torpedoes	Secondary Weapon	Astromech Droids	Reference Cards
•Horton Salm	Proton Torpedoes x2	Ion Cannon Turret	•R5-D8	"Ion Tokens"
•"Dutch" Vander			R2 Astromech	
Gray Squadron Pilot				
Gold Squadron Pilot				

==== TIE Advanced Expansion Pack ====
Pilot Cards	Missiles	Elite Pilot Talent
•Darth Vader	Concussion Missiles	Squad Leader
•Maarek Stele	Cluster Missiles	Swarm Tactics
Storm Squadron Pilot		Expert Handling
Tempest Squadron Pilot		

=== Wave 2 ===
Release date: March 1, 2013

==== Millennium Falcon Expansion Pack ====
Pilot Cards	Crew Cards	Elite Pilot Talent Cards	Missile Cards	Modification Cards	Title Cards	Reference Cards
• Han Solo	• Chewbacca	Draw Their Fire	Assault Missiles	Engine Upgrade x2	• Millennium Falcon	Boost Action
• Lando Calrissian	• Luke Skywalker	Elusiveness	Concussion Missiles	Shield Upgrade x2		
• Chewbacca	• Nien Nunb	Veteran Instincts				
Outer Rim Smuggler	Weapons Engineer					

==== Slave I Expansion Pack ====
Pilot Cards	Crew Upgrade Cards	Elite Pilot Talent Cards	Missile Cards	Secondary Cannon Cards	Bomb Cards	Modification Cards	Title Cards	Reference Cards
• Boba Fett	Gunner	Expose	Assault Missiles	Ion Cannon	Proximity Mines	Stealth Device x2	• Slave I	Bombs Tokens
• Kath Scarlett	Mercenary Copilot	Veteran Instincts	Homing Missiles	Heavy Laser Cannon	Seismic Charges			Ion Tokens
• Krassis Trelix								
Bounty Hunter								

==== A-Wing Expansion Pack ====
Pilot Cards	Missile Cards	Elite Pilot Talent Cards	Reference Cards
• Tycho Celchu	Cluster Missiles	Deadeye	Boost Action
• Arvel Crynyd	Concussion Missiles	Push The Limit	
Green Squadron Pilot	Homing Missiles		
Prototype Pilot			

==== TIE Interceptor Expansion Pack ====
Pilot Cards	Elite Pilot Talent Cards	Reference cards
• Soontir Fel	Daredevil	Boost Action
• Turr Phennir	Elusiveness	
• "Fel's Wrath"		
Saber Squadron Pilot		
Avenger Squadron Pilot		
Alpha Squadron Pilot		

=== Wave 3 ===
Release date: September 13, 2013

==== B-Wing Expansion Pack ====
Pilot Cards	System Cards	Secondary Weapon Cards	Reference Cards
•Ten Numb	Fire Control System	Autoblaster	Ion Tokens
•Ibtisam		Proton Torpedoes	
Dagger Squadron Pilot		Advanced Proton Torpedoes	
Blue Squadron Pilot		Ion Cannon	

==== TIE Bomber Expansion Pack ====
Pilot Cards	Elite Pilot Talent Cards	Secondary Weapon Cards	Missile Cards	Bomb Cards	Reference Cards
•Major Rhymer	Adrenaline Rush	Advanced Proton Torpedoes	Assault Missiles	Seismic Charges	Bomb Tokens
•Captain Jonus				Proton Bomb	Using Bombs
Gamma Squadron Pilot					
Scimitar Squadron Pilot					

==== HWK-290 Expansion Pack ====
Pilot Cards	Crew Upgrade Cards	Secondary Weapon	Title Cards	Reference Cards
•Jan Ors	Recon Specialist	Ion Cannon Turret	Moldy Crow	Ion Tokens
•Kyle Katarn	Saboteur	Blaster Turret		
•Roark Garnet	Intelligence Agent			
Rebel Operative				

==== Lambda-class Shuttle Expansion Pack ====
Pilot Cards	Crew Upgrade Cards	System Cards	Secondary Weapon Cards	Modification Cards	Title Cards	Reference Cards
•Captain Kagi	•Darth Vader	Sensor Jammer	Heavy Laser Cannon	Anti-Pursuit Lasers x2	ST-321	
•Colonel Jendon	Rebel Captive	Advanced Sensors				
•Captain Yorr	Weapons Engineer					
Omicron Group Pilot	Intelligence Agent					
	Navigator					
	Flight Instructor					

=== Wave 4 ===
Released Date: June 26, 2014

==== Z-95 Headhunter Expansion Pack ====
Pilot Cards	Elite Pilot Talent	Modification	Secondary Weapon	Reference Cards
•Airen Cracken	Decoy	Munitions Failsafe	Ion Pulse Missiles	Ion Token
•Lieutenant Blount	Wingman		Assault Missiles	Modifications and Titles
Tala Squadron				
Bandit Squadron Pilot				

==== E-wing Expansion Pack ====
Elite Pilot Talent Cards	Skill Cards	Secondary Weapon Cards	System Cards	Astromechs	Reference Cards
•Corran Horn	Outmaneuver	Flechette Torpedoes	Advanced Sensors	•R7-T1	Boost Action
•Etahn A'baht				R7 Astromech	
Blackmoon Squadron Pilot					
Knave Squadron Pilot					

==== TIE Defender Expansion Pack ====
Pilot Cards	Elite Pilot Talent Cards	Secondary Weapon Cards	Missile Cards	Modification Cards	Reference Cards	Reference Cards
•Rexler Brath	Outmaneuver	Ion Cannon	Ion Pulse Missiles	Munitions Failsafe	Ion Tokens	Modifications and Titles
•Colonel Vessery	Predator					
Onyx Squadron Pilot						
Delta Squadron Pilot						

==== TIE Phantom Expansion Pack ====
Pilot Cards	Crew Upgrade Cards	System Cards	Modification Cards	Reference Cards
•"Whisper"	Tactician	Fire Control System	Advanced Cloaking Device	Modifications and Titles
•"Echo"	Recon Specialist		Stygium Particle Accelerator	Cloak Action
Shadow Squadron Pilot				Decloak
Sigma Squadron Pilot				

=== Wave 5 ===
Released Date: November 26, 2014

==== YT-2400 Freighter Expansion Pack ====
Pilot Cards	Crew Cards	System Cards	Elite Pilot Talent Cards	Secondary Weapon Cards	Title Cards	Reference Cards
•Dash Rendar	•Dash Rendar (crew)	Countermeasures x2	Stay on Target	Heavy Laser Cannon	Outrider	Ion Token
•"Leebo"	•"Leebo" (crew)	Experimental Interface	Lone Wolf	Proton Rockets		Boost Action
•Eaden Vrill	•Lando Calrissian (crew)					
Wild Space Fringer	Gunner					
	Mercenary Copilot					

==== VT-49 Decimator Expansion Pack ====
Pilot Cards	Crew Upgrade Cards	Elite Pilot Talent Cards	Secondary Weapon Cards	Modification Cards	Title Cards	Bomb Cards	Reference Cards
•Rear Admiral Chiraneau	Fleet Officer	Intimidation	Ion Torpedoes	Tactical Jammer x2	Dauntless	Proton Bombs	Ion Token
•Commander Kenkirk	•Mara Jade	Ruthlessness x2					Using Bombs
•Captain Oicunn	•Moff Jerjerrod						Bomb Tokens
Patrol Leader	•Ysanne Isard						

=== Wave 6 ===
Released Date: February 26, 2015

==== Most Wanted Expansion Pack ====
Pilot Cards	Crew Cards	Secondary Weapons Cards	Salvaged Astromech Cards	Elicit Upgrades	Title Cards
•N'dru Suhlak	•Greedo	Autoblaster Turret x2	•"Genius"	"Hot Shot" Blaster	BTL-A4 Y-Wing x2
•Kaa'to Leeachos	K4 Security Droid	Bomb Loadout x2	R4 Agromech x2		•Andrasta
Black Sun Soldier x2	Outlaw Tech		•R4-B11		
Binayre Pirate x2			Salvaged Agromech x2		
•Kavil			Unhinged Astromech x2		
•Drea Renthal					
Hired Gun x2					
Syndicate Thug x2					
•Boba Fett					
•Kath Scarlet					
•Emon Azzameen					
Mandalorian Mercenary					
•Dace Bonearm					
•Palob Godalhi					
•Torkil Mux					
Spice Runner					

==== StarViper Expansion Pack ====
Pilot Cards	Skill Cards	Secondary Weapon Cards	Illicit Upgrades	System Cards	Modification Cards	Title Cards	Reference Cards
•Prince Xizor	Calculation	Ion Torpedoes	Inertial Dampeners	Accuracy Corrector	Autothrusters x2	Virago	Segnor's Loop
•Guri	Bodyguard				Hull Upgrade		Modifications and Titles
Black Sun Vigo							Ion Token
Black Sun Enforcer							Boost

==== M3-A Scyk Interceptor Expansion Pack ====
Pilot Cards	Secondary Weapon Cards	Modification Cards	Title Cards	Reference Cards
•Serissu	Flechette Cannon	Stealth Device	"Heavy Scyk" Interceptor	Modifications and Titles
•Laetin A'Shera	Ion Cannon			Ion Tokens
Tansarii Point Veteran	Mangler Cannon			
Cartel Spacer				

==== IG-2000 Expansion Pack ====
Pilot Cards	Secondary Weapon Cards	Bomb Cards	System Upgrades	Illicit Upgrades	Title Cards	Reference Cards
•IG-88A	Autoblaster	Seismic Charges	Accuracy Corrector	Feedback Array x2	IG-2000	Segnor's Loop
•IG-88B	Mangler Cannon	Proximity Mines		Dead Man's Switch x2		Bomb Tokens
•IG-88C				Inertial Dampeners		Using Bombs
•IG-88D				"Hot Shot" Blaster		

=== Wave 7 ===
Released Date: August 25, 2015

==== YV-666 Light Freighter (Hound's Tooth) Expansion Pack ====
Pilot Cards	Crew Cards	Secondary Weapons Cards	Elite Talents	Illicit Upgrades	Modification Cards	Title Cards
•Bossk	K4 Security Droid	Heavy Laser Cannon	Stay on Target	Glitterstim	Ion Projector	Hound's Tooth™
•Moralo Eval	Outlaw Tech		Lone Wolf		Maneuvering Fins	
•Latts Razzi	•Bossk		Crackshot		Engine Upgrade	
Trandoshan Slaver						
Nashtah Pup Pilot						

==== Kihraxz Expansion Pack ====
Pilot Cards	Elite Pilot Talent Cards	Illicit Upgrades	Secondary Weapons
•Talonbane Cobra	Crackshot	Glitterstim	Homing Missiles
•Graz The Hunter	Predator		
Black Sun Ace	Lightning Reflexes		
Cartel Marauder			

==== K-Wing Expansion Pack ====
Pilot Cards	Crew Cards	Turrets	Secondary Weapon Cards	Bombs	Modification Cards	Reference Cards
•Miranda Doni	Bombardier	Twin Laser Turret (x2)	Extra Munitions	Conner Net	Advanced SLAM	SLAM Action
•Esege Tuketu			Advanced Homing Missiles	Ion Bombs		
Guardian Sq. Pilot			Plasma Torpedoes			
Warden Sq. Pilot						

==== TIE Punisher Expansion Pack ====
Pilot Cards	Secondary Weapon Cards	Bomb Cards	System Upgrades	Modification Cards
•Redline	Extra Munitions	Cluster Mines	Enhanced Scopes	Twin Ion Engine Mk. II
•Deathrain	Flechette Torpedoes	Ion Bombs		
Black Eight Sq. Pilot	Advanced Homing Missiles			
Cutlass Sq. Pilot	Plasma Torpedoes			

=== Wave 8 ===
Release date: March 17, 2016

T-70 X-Wing Expansion Pack

Pilot Cards	Torpedoes	Astromech Droids	Elite Pilot Talent Cards	Modifications	Tech
Ello Asty	Adv. Proton Torpedoes	Targeting Astromech	Cool Hand	Integrated Astromech	Weapons Guidance
"Red Ace"					
Red Squadron Veteran					
Blue Squadron Novice					

TIE/fo Fighter Expansion Pack

Pilot Cards	Elite Pilot Talent Cards	Tech
"Omega Leader"	Juke	Comm Relay
"Zeta Leader"		
"Epsilon Ace"		
Omega Squadron Pilot		
Zeta Squadron Pilot		
Epsilon Squadron Pilot		

==== VCX-100 (Ghost) Expansion Pack ====
Pilot Cards	Crew Cards	Elite Talents	Turrets	Bombs	Torpedoes	System Upgrades	Ship Titles
VCX Pilots:	Kanan Jarrus	Predator	Dorsal Turret x2	Conner Net	Advanced Proton Torpedoes	Reinforced Deflectors	Ghost™
•Hera Syndulla	"Zeb" Orrelios			Cluster Mines			Phantom™
•Kanan Jarrus	"Chopper"			Thermal Detonators			
•"Chopper"	Ezra Bridger						
Lothal Rebel	Hera Syndulla						
Attack Shuttle Pilots:	Sabine Wren						
•Hera Syndulla							
•Sabine Wren							
•Ezra Bridger							
•"Zeb" Orrelios							

==== TIE Advanced Prototype (Inquisitor's TIE) Expansion Pack ====
Pilot Cards	Elite Talents	Missiles	Modifications	Ship Titles
•The Inquisitor	Deadeye	Homing Missiles	Guidance Chips	TIE/v1
•Valen Rudor		XX-23 S-Thread Tracers		
•Baron of the Empire				
Sienar Test Pilot				

==== G-1A Starfighter (Mist Hunter) Expansion Pack ====
Pilot Cards	Crew Cards	Elite Talents	Cannon	System	Illicit	Ship Titles
•Zuckuss	•4-LOM	Adaptability (+/-1)(Dual) x2	Tractor Beam	Electronic Baffle x2	Cloaking Device	Mist Hunter™
•4-LOM	•Zuckuss					
Gand Findsman						
Ruthless Freelancer						

==== JumpMaster 5000 (Punishing One) Expansion Pack ====
Pilot Cards	Crew Cards	Elite Talents	Salvaged Astromech	Torpedoes	Modifications	Illicit	Ship Titles
•Dengar	•Boba Fett	Attanni Mindlink x2	R5-P8	Plasma Torpedes	Guidance Chips x2	Feedback Array	Punishing One™
•Tel Trevura	•"Gonk"	Rage	Overclocked R4				
•Manaroo	•Dengar						
Contracted Scout							

=== Wave 9 ===
Release date: September 23, 2016

==== ARC-170 Expansion Pack ====
Pilot Cards	Crew Cards	Elite Talents	Astromech Droids	Torpedoes	Modifications	Ship Titles
•Nora Wexley	Tail Gunner	Adrenaline Rush	R3 Astromech 2X	Seismic Torpedo	Vectored Thrusters 2X	Alliance Overhaul
•Shara Bey	Recon Specialist					
•Thane Kyrell						
•Braylen Stramm						

==== Special Forces TIE Expansion Pack ====
Pilot Cards	System Upgrades	Elite Talents	Tech Upgrades	Ship Titles
•"Quickdraw"	Collision Detector	Wired	Sensor Cluster x2	Special Ops Training
•"Backdraft"				
Omega Specialist				
Zeta Specialist				

==== Protectorate Starfighter Expansion Pack ====
Pilot Cards	Elite Talents	Ship Titles
•Fenn Rau	Fearlessness	Concord Dawn Protector
•Old Teroch		
•Cad Solus		
Concord Dawn Ace		
Concord Dawn Veteran		
Zealous Recruit		

==== Lancer-Class Pursuit Craft (Shadow Caster) Expansion Pack ====
Pilot Cards	Crew Cards	Elite Talents	Modifications	Illicit	Ship Titles
•Ketsu Onyo	•Latts Razzi	Veteran Instincts	Counter Measures	Rigged Cargo Chute	•Shadow Caster
•Asajj Ventress	•Ketsu Onyo		Gyroscopic Targeting	Black Market Slicer Tools (x2)	
•Sabine Wren	•IG-88D		Tactical Jammer (x2)		
Shadowport Hunter					

=== Wave 10 ===
Release date: February 2, 2017

==== Sabine's TIE Fighter Expansion Pack ====
Pilot Cards	Elite Talents	Crew	Illicit	Modification	Conditions	Ship Titles
•Sabine Wren	Veteran Instincts	•Captain Rex	•EMP Device	Captured TIE	•Suppressive Fire	•Sabine's Masterpiece
•Ahsoka Tano						
•Captain Rex						
•"Zeb"						

==== Upsilon-Class Shuttle Expansion Pack ====
Pilot Cards	Crew	Elite Talents	Tech Upgrades	Modification	Conditions	Ship Titles
•Kylo Ren	•Kylo Ren	Snap Shot (x2)	Targeting Synchronizer (x2)	ion Projector (x2)	•I'll show you the Dark Side	Kylo Ren's Shuttle
•Major Stridan	•General Hux		Hyperwave Comm Scanner (x2)		•Fanatical Devotion	
•Lieutenant Dormitz	Operations Specialist (x2)					
Starkiller Base Pilot						

==== Quadjumper Expansion Pack ====
Pilot Cards	Crew Cards	Elite Talents	Modifications	Bombs	Illicit	Tech Upgrades	Conditions
•Unkar Plutt	•Unkar Plutt	•A Score to Settle	Spacetug Tractor Array	Thermal Detonators	Scavenger Crane	Hyperwave Comm Scanner	•A Debt to Pay
•Contable Zuvio	•BoShek						
•Sarco Plank							
Jakku Gunrunner							

==== U-Wing Expansion Pack ====
Release Date: December 15, 2016

Pilot Cards	Elite Talents	Crew	Modification	System Upgrades	Torpedoes	Ship Titles
•Cassian Andor	Expertise (x2)	•Jyn Erso	Stealth Device (x2)	Sensor Jammer	Flechette Torpedoes	Pivot Wing
•Bodhi Rook		•Cassian Andor				
•Heff Tobber		•Baze Malbus				
Blue Squadron Pathfinder		•Bistan				
		•Bodhi Rook				
		Inspiring Recruit (x2)				

==== TIE Striker Expansion Pack ====
Release Date: December 15, 2016

Pilot Cards	Elite Talents	Modifications	Ship Titles
•"Duchess"	•Swarm Leader	Lightweight Frame	Adaptive Ailerons
•"Pure Sabacc"			
•"Countdown"			
Black Squadron Scout			
Scarif Defender			
Imperial Trainee			

=== Wave 11 ===
Release Date: July 13, 2017

==== TIE Aggressor Expansion Pack ====
Pilot Cards	Elite Talents	Modifications	Missiles	Turrets
•Lieutenant Kestal	Intensity	Lightweight Frame	Unguided Rockets	Twin Laser Turret
•"Double Edge"				Synced Turret
Onyx Squadron Escort				
Sienar Specialist				

==== Auzituck Gunship Expansion Pack ====
Pilot Cards	Elite Talents	Crew	Modifications
Wullffwarro	Intimidation	Tactician	Hull Upgrade
Lowhhrick	Selflessness	Breach Specialist	
Wookie Liberator		Wookiee Commandos	
Kashyyyk Defender			

==== Scurrg H-6 Bomber Expansion Pack ====
Pilot Cards	Elite Talents	Torpedoes	Missiles	Turrets	Bomb	Crew	Title	System	Salvaged Astromech
•Captain Nym (Rebel)	Lightning Reflexes	Seismic Torpedoes	Cruise Missiles x2	Synced Turret	•Bomblet Generator	Cad Bane	•Havoc	Minefield Mapped	•R4-E1
•Captain Nym (Scum)									
•Sol Sixxa									
Lok Revenant									
Karthakk Pirate									

=== Wave 12 ===
Released Date: December 8, 2017

==== Alpha-class Star Wing ====
Pilot Cards	Elite Talents	Modifications	Cannon	Missile	Titles
•Major Vynder	Saturation Salvo	Advanced SLAM	Linked Battery	Cruise Missiles	Xg-1 Assault Configuration
•Lieutenant Karsabi			Jamming Beam		Os-1 Arsenal Loadout
Rho Squadron Veteran					
Nu Squadron Pilot					

==== Phantom II ====
Pilot Cards	Astromechs	Crews	Titles
•Fenn Rau	•"Chopper"	•Maul	•Ghost
•Ezra Bridger	Flight-Assist Astromech	Courier Droid	•Phantom II
•"Zeb" Orrelios			
•AP-5			

==== M12-L Kimogila Fighter ====
Pilot Cards	Elite Talents	Missiles	Torpedoes	Salvaged Astromech	Illicit	Title
•Torani Kulda	Saturation Salvo	Scrambler Missiles	Plasma Torpedoes	•R5-TK	Dead Man's Switch	•Enforcer
•Dalan Oberos					Contraband Cybernetics	
Cartel Executioner						
Cartel Brute						

=== Wave 13 ===
==== TIE Silencer ====
Pilot Cards	Elite Talents	System	Tech	Modification	Title	Condition
•Kylo Ren	Debris Gambit (2X)	Sensor Jammer	Primed Thrusters	Autothrusters (2X)	•First Order Vanguard	•I'll Show You the Dark Side
•Test Pilot "Blackout"	Advanced Optics (2X)					
First Order Test Pilot	Threat Tracker (2X)					
Sienar-Jaemus Analyst						

==== Resistance Bomber ====
Pilot Cards	Bomb	System	Tech	Title	Modification	Condition
•"Crimsom Leader"	Conner Net (2X)	Trajectory Simulator (3X)	Targeting Synchronizer	Crossfire Formation	Deflective Platting	•Rattled
•"Cobalt Leader"	Ordnance Silos	Advanced Optics				
•"Crimsom Specialist"	Seismic Charges					
Crimsom Squadron Pilot	Thermal Detonators					

=== Wave 14 ===
==== TIE Reaper ====
Pilot Cards	Elite Talent	Crew	Title	Condition
•Major Vermell	Decoy	System Officer (2X)	Advanced Ailerons	•Optimized Prototype
•Captain Feroph		•Death Troopers		
•"Vizier"		•Director Krennic		
Scarif Base Pilot		ISB Slicer		
		Tactical Officer (2X)		

==== Saw's Renegades ====
Pilot Cards	Elite Talent	Crew	Astromech	System	Modifications	Titles
•Saw Gerrera	Crack Shot	•Saw Gerrera (Crew)	Flight-Assist Astromech	•Targeting Scrambler	Servomotor S-Foils (5X)	Pivot Wing
•Benthic Two Tubes		•Magva Yarro (Crew)				Renegade Refit (3X)
•Kullbee Sperado						
•Levan Tenza						
•Edrio "Two Tubes"						
•Cavern Angel Zealost (5X)						

=== Other Expansions ===
==== Imperial Aces ====
Release date: March 14, 2014

Pilot Cards	Skill Cards	Modification Cards	Title Cards
•Carnor Jax	Push The Limit x2	Shield Upgrade x2	Royal Guard Tie x2
•Kir Kanos	Opportunist x2	Hull Upgrade x2	
•Tetran Cowall		Targeting Computer x2	
•Lieutenant Lorrir			
Royal Guard Pilot			
Saber Squadron Pilot			

==== Rebel Aces ====
Release date: September 25, 2014

Pilot Cards	Crew Cards	Missile Cards	Modification Cards	System Cards	Title Cards
•Jake Farrell	•Jan Ors	Chardaan Refit x3	B-Wing/E2 x2	Enhanced Scopes x2	A-Wing Test Pilot x2
•Gemmer Sojan	•Kyle Katarn	Proton Rockets x2			
•Keyan Farlander					
•Nera Dantels					
Green Squadron Pilot					
Prototype Pilot					
Dagger Squadron Pilot					
Blue Squadron Pilot					

==== Imperial Veterans ====
Release date: June 30, 2016

Pilot Cards	Elite Pilot Talent	Crew	Bomb Cards	Cannon Cards	Modification Cards	Title Cards
•Maarek Stele	CrackShot	Systems Officer	Proximity Mines	Tractor Beam	Long Range Scanner	TIE /x7 x2
•Countess Ryad			Cluster Mines			TIE /D x2
•Tomax Bren						TIE Shuttle x2
•"Deathfire"						
Glaive Squadron Veteran						
Gamma Squadron Pilot						

==== Heroes of the Resistance Expansion Pack ====
Release date: October 26, 2016

Pilot Cards	Crew Cards	Astromech	Elite Pilot Talent	Illicit	Title Cards	Tech Upgrades	Modification Cards
•Han Solo	•Finn	•M9-G8	Snap Shot (x2)	Burnout Slam (x2)	•Millennium Falcon	Primed Thrusters	Integrated Astromech
•Rey	•Rey		Trick Shot (x2)		•Black One	Pattern Analyzer	Smuggling Compartment
•Chewbacca	Hotshot Co-pilot						
Resistance Sympathizer							
•Poe Dameron							
•Nien Numb							
•"Snap" Wexley							
•Jess Pava							
Red Squadron Veteran							
Blue Squadron Novice							

==== Guns for Hire Expansion Pack ====
Pilot Cards	Modifications	Condition	Illicit	Missile	Titles
•Viktor Hel	Stealth Device	Harpooned! (2X)	Ion Dischargers (2X)	Harpoon Missiles	Vaksai (2X)
•Captain Jostero	Vectored Thrusters	•Shadowed			StarViper Mk.II (2X)
Black Sun Ace	Pulsed Ray Shield (2X)	•Mimicked			
Cartel Marauder					
•Dalan Oberos					
•Thweek					
Black Sun Assassin (2X)					

==== GR75 Transport Expansion Pack ====
Release date: April 30, 2014

Pilot Cards	Cargo Cards	Crew Cards	Astromech Cards	Title Cards	Torpedo Cards
•Wes Janson	Slicer Tools	General Jan Dodonna	R5-P9	Bright Hope	Flechette Torpedo 4X
•Jek Porkins	Coms Booster	Toryn Far	R3-A2	Quantum Storm	
•Derek "Hobbie" Klivian	Shield Projector	Carlist Rieekan	R2-D6	Dutyfree	
•Tarn Mison		WED-15 Repair Droid	R4-D6		

==== CR90 Corvette Expansion Pack ====
Release date: May 22, 2014

Cargo Cards	Crew Cards	Hardpoint Cards	Team Cards	Title Cards
Coms Booster x2	•Raymus Antilles	Single Turbolasers x3	Engineering Team	Dodonna's Pride
Ionization Reactor	•Leia Organa	Quad Laser Cannons	Gunnery Team	Tantive IV
Tibanna Gas Supplies	•R2-D2(crew)		Sensor Team	Jaina's Light
Backup Shield Generator	Targeting Coordinator			
Engine Booster	C-3PO			
CR90 Corvette (FORE)	Han Solo			
CR90 Corvette (AFT)				

==== Imperial Raider Expansion Pack ====
Release date: August 13, 2015

Pilot Cards	Missile Cards	Crew Cards	System Cards	Title Cards	Cargo Cards	Hardpoint Cards	Team Cards
•Commander Alozen	Cluster Missiles	•Admiral Ozzel	Advanced Targeting Computer (x4)	•Assailer	Backup Shield Generator	Ion Cannon battery (x4)	Engineering Team
•Juno Eclipse	Proton Rockets	•Captain Needa		•Impetuous	Comms Booster	Quad Laser Cannons (x2)	Gunnery Team
•Lieutenant Colzet		•Emperor Palpatine		•Instigator	Engine Booster	Single Turbolasers (x2)	Sensor Team
Raider-class Corv. (Aft)		•Grand Moff Tarkin		TIE/x1 (x4)	Tibanna Gas Supplies		
Raider-class Corv. (Fore)		Shield Technician (x2)					
Storm Squadron Pilot							
Tempest Squadron Pilot							
•Zertik Strom							

==== Imperial Assault Carrier Expansion Pack ====
Release date: December 23, 2015

Pilot Cards	Missile Cards	Crew Cards	Elite Talents	Title Cards	Cargo Cards	Hardpoint Cards	Team Cards	Modifications
•"Scourge"	Cluster Missiles	•Agent Kallus	Expose	•Requiem	Broadcast Array	Dual Laser Turret	Ordnance Experts (x2)	Automated Protocols (x2)
•"Wampa"	Homing Missiles	•Rear Admiral Chiraneau	Marksmanship	•Suppressor	Docking Clamps			Optimized Generators (x2)
•"Youngster"	Ion Torpedoes	Construction Droid (x2)	Expert Handling	•Vector	Cluster Bombs			Ordnance Tubes (x2)
•"Chaser"								
Black Squadron Pilot x2								
Obsidian Squadron Pilot x2								
Academy Pilot x2								
Gozanti-class Cruiser								

==== C-ROC Cruiser Expansion Pack ====
Release date: Q1 2017

Pilot Cards	Turrets	Cannon	Crew Cards	Team	Modifications	Hardpoints	Titles	Cargo
C-ROC Cruiser Pilot	Heavy Laser Turret	ARC Caster (5X)	•Cikatro Vizago	IG-RM Thug Droids	Pulsed Ray Shield (5X)	Heavy Laser Turret	"Heavy Scyk" Interceptor	Supercharged Power Cells (2X)
•Genesis Red			•Azmoigan		Optimized Generators		"Light Scyk" Interceptor (6X)	Quick Release Cargo Locks
•Quinn Jast			•Jabba the Hutt		Automated Protocols (2X)		•Merchant One	
•Inaldra							•Broken Horn	
•Sunny Bounder							•Insatiable Worrt	
Tansarii Point Veteran								
Cartel Spacer								

=== Supplies/Accessories ===
- X-Wing: Dice Pack
- Star Wars Dice for iOS and Android - Dice rolling app
- X-Wing: Death Star Assault Playmat
- X-Wing: Starfield Playmat
- X-Wing: Death Star II Playmat
- X-Wing: Bespin Playmat
- X-Wing: Starkiller Base Playmat
- X-Wing: Battle of Hoth Playmat

== Competitive Tournaments ==
X-wing tournaments were frequently held at local game stores and at larger scale gaming conventions such as Adepticon, Gen-Con, and various other world wide venues. The first large tournament was held at Gen-Con 2012. World Championships were held often held at or near the Fantasy Flight Games Centers before transitioning to Adepticon beginning in 2023.

=== FFG & AMG World Champions ===
Year	Champion	Faction	Location
2012	Doug Kinney	Galactic Empire	FFG Headquarters Roseville, MN
2013	Paul Heaver	Rebel Alliance	Fantasy Flight Games Center
2014	Paul Heaver	Rebel Alliance	Fantasy Flight Games Center
2015	Paul Heaver	Rebel Alliance	Fantasy Flight Games Center
2016	Nand Torfs	Scum & Villainy	Fantasy Flight Games Center
2017	Justin Phua	Scum & Villainy	Fantasy Flight Games Center
2018	Simeon Dellapina	Scum & Villainy	Fantasy Flight Games Center
2019	Oli Pocknell	Galactic Empire	St Paul, MN
2020- 2022	Skipped	N/A	COVID-19 restrictions
2023	Niklas God	First Order	Adepticon Schaumburg, Illinois
2024	Illias Ikonomidis	Galactic Republic	Adepticon Schaumberg, Illinois

== See also ==
- Star Wars Miniatures Battles
