= Decrypto =

Spy-themed deduction board game

- Designers: Thomas Dagenais-Lespérance
- Illustrators: Fabien Fulchiron; Nicolas Rivet; Manuel Sanchez
- Publishers: Le Scorpion Masque
- Publication: 2018; 8 years ago
- Genres: Party game
- Players: 3–8
- Playing time: 15–45 minutes
- Age range: 12+
- Website: scorpionmasque.com/en/decrypto

Decrypto is a 2018 espionage-themed party game designed by Thomas Dagenais-Lespérance and published by Le Scorpion Masque in which two teams of players attempt to decode three-digit codes using clues about secret numbered words and determine the secret words of the opposing team.

== Gameplay ==
Two teams of players each draw a set of four cards showing a selection of secret words, called "keywords", which are numbered from one to four. In each round, a member of each team assumes the role of Encryptor and attempts to help their team guess a three-digit number code without the opposing team intercepting the code by giving clues referring to their team's keywords with the corresponding numbers.

Before the Encryptor's team can guess the code, the opposing team has a chance to do so following the first round. If the intercepting team succeeds in guessing the other team's code, they win an Interception Token. If a team manages to win two Interception Tokens, that team wins. Following this, the Encryptor's team can attempt to guess the code. If a team isn't able to guess the code given by their own Encryptor, they receive a Miscommunication Token. If a team manages to win two Miscommunication Tokens, that team loses. Otherwise, the game continues until one of these two win conditions is met.

In the event of a tie, each team says the four words they think are the opposing team's keywords. The team with the most correct guesses is the winner.

=== Expansions and editions ===
The Decrypto Laser Drive expansion was released in 2019 and added a set of optional rules. In each round, a category card is called and at least one of the Encryptor's clues must match the given category. If all three clues match the category the Encryptor's team receives a Laser Token, which can be spent to guess the opposing team's keywords to receive an Interception Token.

In 2023, the Decrypto: 5th Anniversary Edition was released, which featured updated cover art and a new set of secret words.

== Reception ==
In 2022, Polygon listed Decrypto as one of the "best party games," with contributor Charlie Theel writing that "Decrypto is a very unusual party game that promises dramatic highs and lows. It captures a light sense of espionage and the payoff is tremendous." Owen Duffy, writing for The Guardian, called the game "an addictively brainy challenge, and a brilliant light and simple game for big groups" and praised it for its innovative gameplay in the espionage-themed board game genre.

Decrypto was nominated for Best Party Game in The Dice Tower's 2018 Gaming Awards and was a finalist for Best Multiplayer General Strategy Game in the International Gamers Awards. It was the winner of the 2019 UK Games Expo Best Party Game People's Choice Award and the 2019 Årets spill Best Party Game Award.
