= Take the Galaxy =

Card game

- Cover Art
- Designers: Piet Schellens / Tim van Geel
- Illustrators: Tim van Geel
- Publishers: Catch Time Studio
- Publication: Q1 2018
- Players: 1–4
- Playing time: 45–60 minutes
- Chance: Medium
- Skills: Economic management; Strategic thought
- Website: Take the Galaxy - Catch Time Studio

Take the Galaxy is a competitive science-fiction card game for 1-4 players produced by Catch Time Studio. It was funded by a Kickstarter campaign, exceeding its funding goals. It currently has a rating of 7.2 on BoardGameGeek.

== Mechanics ==
Each player has an identical deck containing colonies and star ships, and there is a space deck containing planets and events. Using the resources Manpower, Science, Production and Credits, players claim planets, place colonies, and produce victory points. The winner is the player with the most victory points from planets and in token form by the end of the game. Players must adapt throughout the game because resources are not stored between turns, and players can only make use of four planets at the same time. If they wish to colonize a fifth planet, they must give up their oldest planet (though they keep the victory points from it). Starships are also available, which are a permanent benefit. Event cards can offer opportunities or impose restrictions until a player can pay the cost to complete them. Take the Galaxy can be played solitaire, with 2-4 players competing individually, or with two teams of two players each.
