= Elberta Arts Center =

Arts center in Nashville, Arkansas

Coordinates: 33°56′35″N 93°50′49″W

One of the smallest communities in the state of Arkansas to have an arts center, Nashville, Arkansas is home to the Elberta Arts Center located on downtown Main Street. The center is the home to the Elberta Arts Council and Humanities, a non-profit arts organization founded by Marie Murray Martin in February 2000. The Center features a permanent collection of various local artists and includes the neon marquee from the 1950s Elberta Theater.

== History ==
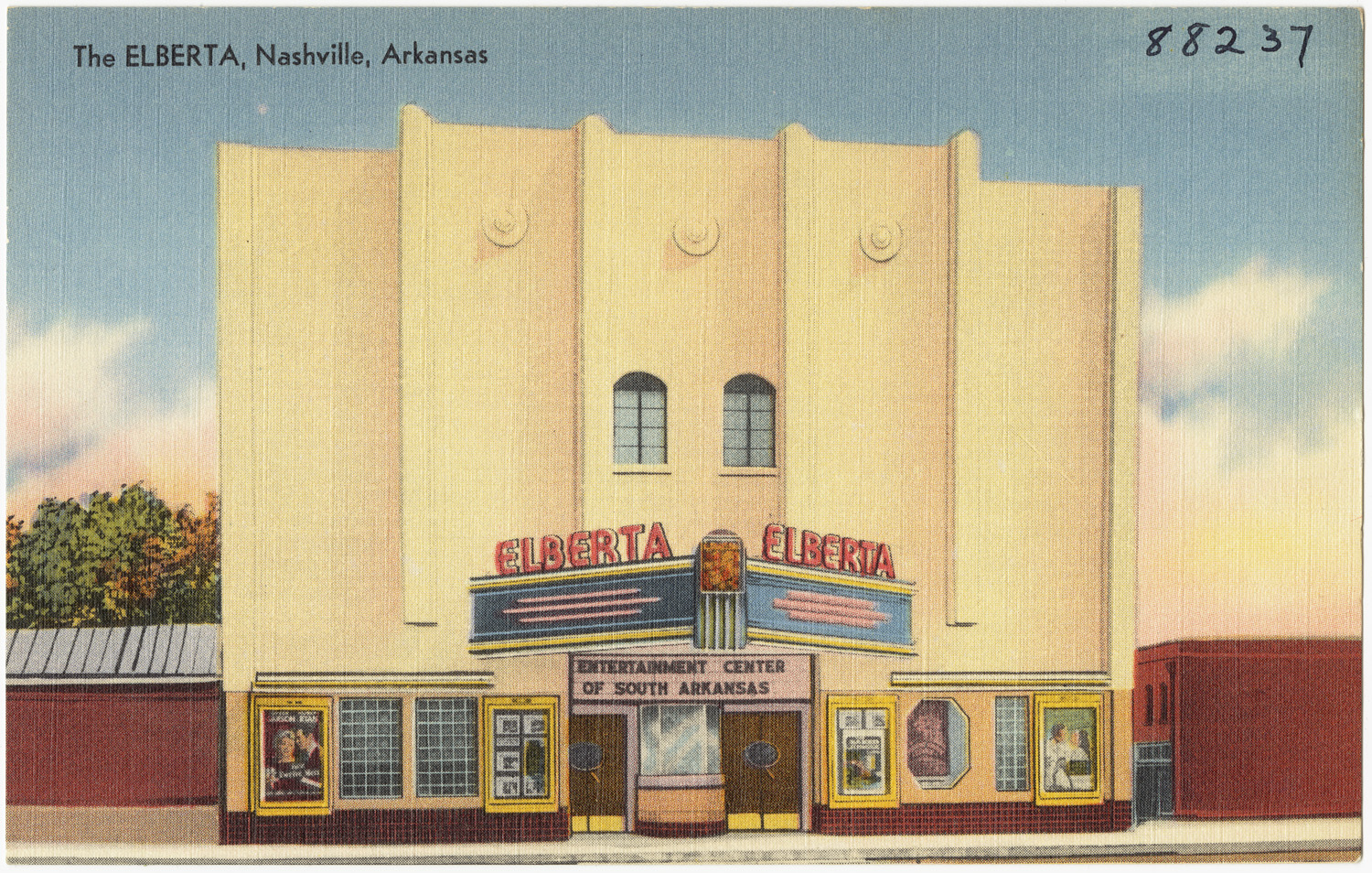
Former Elberta cinema, whose neon sign is still preserved by the modern Arts Center.

The Elberta Arts Center's grand-opening began with an artist reception honoring Lankford Moore in November 2000. Since 2000, the center has been instrumental in bringing public art to the small city. The center's first public art project was the downtown mural painted by Johnce Parrish on the corner of Main and Clark Street. The mural highlighted Howard County's long prominence in farming and its love affair with the Elberta peach.

== Charter ==
The first board of directors were Dolly Henley, director of Nashville City Parks and Recreation; Deborah D. Phillips, former-director of the Hot Springs Fine Arts Center; Becky Rockenbach, former-director of the Literacy of Howard County; Linda Spillers, R.N., Arkansas Dept. of Health IHS; Sarah Terwilliger, former-juvenile ombudsman, Arkansas Public Defender Commission; Diane Morrow, artist and owner of Henley Graphics and Marie A. Martin, founder/director of EAC and former-director of the Fine Arts Center of Hot Springs, Arkansas (2002–2004). Martin is a native of Winthrop, Massachusetts.

== Awards ==
In the summer of 2001, the Elberta Arts Council and Humanities was named among several arts organizations chosen to be a grant recipient of the Arkansas Arts Council's three year expansion arts program. The grant began in 2002 and ended in 2005.

Just two years after the center opened it was named the Nashville Chamber of Commerce Organization of the Year-2003.

The Arkansas Department of Heritage awarded the Elberta Arts Council a grant in observation of Arkansas Heritage Month. The grant funded a program called, "Preserving Howard County's Heritage." During the month of May 2007, the Center hosted activities that included a month-long quilt exhibit which was organized by the Elberta Quilter's Guild. In addition, area artisans demonstrated bladesmithing, leather-tooling and needle-work.

In 2001, Martin was nominated for an Arkansas Governor's Art Award in community development.

== Exhibits ==
Bob Tommey, famed cowboy artist shows at Elberta on Thur., July 11, 2002.

Dr. Frank Latimer, UACCH 'Reclaiming Space' June 1, 2006

Home address: 109 S. Main Street Nashville, AR 71852 870-451-9966
