= Alison Kosik =

American journalist

- Born: April 28, 1971 (age 55); Miami, Florida, U.S.
- Education: American University (BA)
- Occupation: Journalist

Alison Kosik (born April 28, 1971) is an American journalist, currently working freelance for ABC News as an anchor/correspondent, and a former business correspondent for CNN. Her first book, What’s Up With Women And Money? How To Do All The Financial Stuff You’ve Been Avoiding, was released on March 4, 2025.

== Biography ==
Kosik was born in Miami, Florida, the daughter of Brenda (née Seinfeld) and Gilbert Kosik. She attended Nova High School and graduated with a B.A. in Broadcast Journalism and Political Science from American University in Washington, D.C.

She began her career in Corpus Christi, Texas working as a reporter for KZTV-TV and KRIS-TV and then moved to West Palm Beach, Florida where she worked as a reporter and fill-in anchor for WPEC-TV/WFLX-TV. She then moved to Washington D.C. where she worked first as a business correspondent for EnergyNewsLive.com covering the energy sector; then as a reporter and anchor for the Sinclair Broadcast Group; and then as a reporter for Hearst-Argyle Television. She then accepted a position as an investigative reporter at WCBS-TV in New York City.

She joined CNN as a business correspondent covering the New York Stock Exchange. During a wave of layoffs at the end of 2022, it was announced that Kosik would be among those leaving CNN. On March 2, 2023, after 15 years with CNN, she posted on her Instagram marking her last day.

In 2023, Kosik began working as a freelance anchor and correspondent for ABC News, appearing in national segments and breaking news coverage.

Kosik received a Scripps Howard New Media Fellowship from Columbia University in 2001, and in 1999 received a Florida AP Award for Best Spot News. She was a 1993 Fellow of the International Radio and Television Society.
