= Rising Sun (board game) =

Board game

- Designers: Eric M. Lang
- Illustrators: Adrian Smith
- Publishers: CMON Limited (2018)
- Players: 3-5
- Setup time: 10 minutes
- Playing time: 90 - 120 minutes
- Chance: Low
- Skills: Strategy, Diplomacy

Rising Sun is a board game for 3 to 5 players designed by Eric M. Lang and published by CMON Limited in 2017. Rising Sun is a game about strategy, negotiation, and warfare in a feudal Japan where the ancient gods (Kami) have returned to rebuild the empire.

The game was originally released via Kickstarter, raising over $4,200,000. Rising Sun received positive reviews, and was awarded with the 2018 RPC Fantasy Award Tabletop & Miniatures Game Winner.

The name of a character in the game Kotahi, has been found to be a name used in New Zealand and the Maori word for one.

== Gameplay ==
Rising Sun takes place in a mythical version of Japan. You lead a clan to conquest and gain the favors of the Gods.

The game consists of three played seasons. Players, in order to achieve their goals, can Train, Marshall, Harvest, Recruit or Betray. Each of these phases allows different actions. At the end of the season, players resolve combat in provinces claimed by two opponents. The combat has different options: Seppuku, Hostage, Rōnin and Imperial Poets. Monsters can be obtained to support the clans.

== Release and reception ==
Rising Sun was initially sold via Kickstarter, with about 31,262 backers contributing to $4,228,060 during the campaign. It was delivered to backers in April 2018 and then released in retail stores.

Rising Sun won the 2018 RPC Fantasy Award Tabletop & Miniatures. The website BoardGameGeek gave it the score of 8/10 with close to 10,000 ratings and 2,000 comments.

The initial reception of the board game was mixed, but favored positive reviews. Ars Technica described it as "A cerebral board game of conquest, diplomacy, and betrayal" and Board Games Land noted that the game is a "showpiece that looks epic and feels grandiose".

== Expansions ==
There were four official expansion released in 2018:

- Dynasty Invasion: adds 2 new clans to the game (Moon Clan and Sun Clan), allowing it to be played by 6 players.
- Daimyo Box: contains all the exclusive stretch goals unlocked during the Kickstarter, including the Fox Clan
- Kami Unbound: new ruleset which makes the presence of the Kami even more potent
- Monster Pack: adds four monsters (Oni of Plagues, Fire Dragon, Jinmenju and Jorogumo)
