= Repetition variation =

Advertising strategy

Repetition Variation is an advertising strategy that modifies repeated ads to maintain consumer interest and effectiveness while avoiding overexposure. It aims to mitigate "wearout," a decline in engagement due to overly repetitive content.

== Overview ==
This approach includes two main types: cosmetic variation and substantive variation.

- Cosmetic variation involves minor changes, such as different colors or slight visual adjustments, that do not alter the core message.
- Substantive variation introduces significant modifications, such as changes in themes, narratives, or ad formats, to create fresh experiences while retaining the brand's identity.

== Research ==
Research has explored its impact on consumer behavior. For instance, the "Repetition/Variation Hypotheses" (1989) discusses how strategic variations in advertising can sustain consumer engagement over time. Similarly, "The Salience of Marketing Stimuli" (2012) highlights that varied marketing stimuli enhance brand recall and reduce ad fatigue by keeping the audience intrigued.

== See also ==
- DAGMAR marketing
- Behavioral retargeting
