= Layman Allen =

Layman E. Allen was a law professor at the University of Michigan. While searching for a way to motivate his Sunday School students, he invented a logic game called WFF 'N PROOF.

== Career ==
In the 1960s, University of Michigan law professor and research scientist Layman E. Allen began aiming to dispel the idea that learning must be tedious, and designed games to engage players of all ages in increasingly complex forms of abstract reasoning. By the 1970s, his creations became widely used at elementary, junior and senior high schools across the United States. By the late 1970s, W'ff 'N Proof was an academic and commercial success, with Allen estimating he sold more than 200,000 and showing a dramatic improvement on student scores in intelligence tests. Allen and his team introduced one of his games to seventh graders in inner-city Detroit schools, who continued playing the game throughout high school and went on to attend college; Allen noted that the area had a historically low rate of college-bound students, and viewed their success as strong evidence of the program's effectiveness. In the 1980s in Ann Arbor, Michigan, his academic games were used in academic competitions. Allen started the Michigan League of Academic Games.

Allen died in 2018.

== Games ==
- WFF 'N PROOF focuses on logical structure—its name derived from "Well-Formed Formula"
- Queries 'n Theories, with Peter Kugel, and Joan Ross (WFF 'N Proof) explores the concepts of the scientific method and language through gameplay. At its core, the game features a single participant called the Native, who constructs a unique language using colored chips to represent words
- Equations challenges players through mathematical problem-solving; computer version of Equations allows a student to play against a computer opponent instead of another student
- On-Sets teaches math skills
- POE is a nonsimulation mathematical game
