= Star Wars: X-Wing Second Edition =

How the x-wing has evolved

Star Wars: X-Wing Miniatures Second Edition
- Manufacturers: Atomic Mass Games
- Designers: Frank Brooks, Max Brooke, Alex Davy (Second Edition) Jay Little (First Edition)
- Publishers: Andrew Navaro
- Publication: September 13, 2018
- Years active: 2018 to 2024
- Genres: Wargaming Miniatures
- Players: 2
- Playing time: 30-45 Minutes (90 Minutes for Competitive Play)
- Chance: Medium (Dice Rolling)
- Age range: 14+
- Website: https://www.atomicmassgames.com/xwing/

Star Wars: X-Wing Second Edition is the second edition of the miniature war game designed by Jay Little and produced by Fantasy Flight Games that was first announced on May 1, 2018, with the first release on September 13 of the same year. On November 16, 2020, Atomic Mass Games (another subsidiary of Asmodee) announced that it would be responsible for X-wing and its two sister games, Legion and Armada.

The games features tactical ship-to-ship dogfighting between various factions and starfighters set in the fictional Star Wars universe. The game is played in a series of rounds wherein both players set maneuvers for each of their ships in the battle area without knowledge of the opponent's maneuvers. The game is over when one player's fleet is entirely destroyed, or the timer runs out. The second edition of the game is compatible with the Star Wars: X-Wing Miniatures first edition ship models via the conversion kits made for each of the 5 factions (First Order and Resistance are separate factions in Second Edition), however, rules, tokens, and damage cards have all been changed, meaning that you will still need to buy a Second Edition Core Set or purchase each of these components individually.

There are also Epic rules for playing more scenario based games that can involve more than 2 players and immerse your combat into the Star Wars universe.

On 13 June 2024, Atomic Mass Games announced the end of the development of the game.

== Game Description ==
Publisher's Description of the Core Set: "Enter the next era of interstellar combat in the Star Wars galaxy! In X-Wing: Second Edition, you assemble a squadron of iconic starfighters from across the Star Wars saga and engage in fast-paced, high-stakes space combat with iconic pilots such as Luke Skywalker and Darth Vader.

With refined gameplay that focuses on the physical act of flying starships, X-Wing Second Edition lets you create your own Star Wars space battles right on your tabletop. Intuitive mechanics create the tense atmosphere of a firefight while beautifully pre-painted miniatures draw you deeper into the action. Man your ships and enter the fray!"

Additional Game Description: "Featuring detailed and painted miniatures, X-Wing recreates Star Wars space battles from small engagements of only a couple of crafts, to large conflicts where multiple squadrons clash. Select and equip your ships, pick your crew, plan your attack, and complete your mission!"

Fast and visceral, X-Wing puts you in the middle of fierce Star Wars firefights. Use each craft’s unique maneuver dial to secretly plot its movement action for each turn. After each player has locked in his movement decisions, the dials are revealed and ships are moved. Pepper the enemy with blaster fire as you rush into the dogfight, or move into combat range slowly, attaining deadly target locks before you launch a devastating attack. No matter your plan of attack, you’ll be in total control throughout the tense action!"

== The Core Set ==
The X-Wing Second Edition Core Set contains two TIE/ln fighter miniatures and one T-65 X-wing miniature, along with all of the maneuver templates, dials, cards, dice, and rules that you need to play the game.

== Core set - Included Components ==
=== Ships ===
- T-65 X-Wing
- TIE/ln Fighter (x2)

=== Pilots ===
==== Rebel Pilots ====
- •Luke Skywalker
- •Jek Porkins
- Red Squadron Veteran
- Blue Squadron Escort

Ship tokens are dual-sided and have the following front/back combinations:
- Luke Skywalker / Red Squadron Veteran
- Jek Porkins / Blue Squadron Escort

==== Imperial Pilots ====
- •Iden Versio (x2 ship tokens; 1 pilot card)
- •Valen Rudor (x2 ship tokens; 1 pilot card)
- Black Squadron Ace (x2)
- •"Night Beast" (x2 ship tokens; 1 pilot card)
- Obsidian Squadron Pilot (x2)
- Academy Pilot (x2)

Ship tokens are dual-sided and have the following front/back combinations:
- Iden Versio / Black Squadron Ace
- Iden Versio / Black Squadron Ace
- Valen Rudor / Obsidian Squadron Pilot
- Valen Rudor / Obsidian Squadron Pilot
- "Night Beast" / Academy Pilot
- "Night Beast" / Academy Pilot

=== Upgrades ===
- Elusive - Talent
- Outmaneuver - Talent
- Predator - Talent
- Heightened Perception (x2) - Force
- Instinctive Aim - Force
- Sense (x2) - Force
- Supernatural Reflexes (x2) - Force
- Proton Torpedoes - Torpedo
- R2 Astromech - Astromech
- •R2-D2 - Astromech
- R3 Astromech - Astromech
- R5 Astromech - Astromech
- •R5-D8 - Astromech
- Servomotor S-foils - Configuration
- Hull Upgrade - Modification
- Shield Upgrade - Modification
- Afterburners - Modification

=== Tokens/Cardboard Assets ===
- Asteroids (x3)
- Debris Clouds (x3)
- Disarm Token
- Critical Damage Markers (x3)
- Evade Tokens (x3)
- Focus Tokens (x4)
- Force Charge Markers (x2)
- Hyperspace Markers (x2)
- Ship ID Markers #1-6 (3 of each)
- Ion Tokens (x3)
- Initiative Marker
- Lock Tokens #1-6
- Position Markers (x2)
- Shield Tokens (x4)
- Standard Charge Markers (x6)
- Stress Tokens (x5)
- T-65 X-Wing Dial ID Token
- TIE/ln Fighter Dial ID Token (x2)

The Core Set also includes the quick start guide, rulebook, 3 small ship bases, 6 standard miniature pegs, 3 movement dial pegs, the T-65 X-Wing Movement Dial, 2 TIE/ln Fighter Movement Dials, a damage deck of 33 cards, a range ruler, 11 maneuver templates, 3 defense dice, 3 attack dice, 2 T-65 X-Wing quick build Cards, 2 TIE/ln Fighter quick build cards, and the 3 pre-assembled, pre-painted miniatures.

== Factions ==
There are a total of 7 playable factions in the Second Edition of the game. Each faction is based on a side of the galaxy-wide conflicts set forth by the Skywalker Saga movies with the 7th faction being iconic characters who are unaligned across all 3 eras of conflict. While the core set features only two of the possible 7 playable factions –– the Rebel Alliance and the Galactic Empire –– the others are sold in expansion packs, or can be carried over from the first edition of the game using the aforementioned conversion kits.

- The Clone Wars
  - Confederacy of Independent Systems (CIS)
  - Galactic Republic
- Galactic Civil War
  - Rebel Alliance
  - Galactic Empire
- New Republic
  - Resistance
  - First Order
- Scum and Villainy (all conflicts)

== Expansions ==
=== Wave 1 ===
(Announced: May 1, 2018 / Released: September 13, 2018)

==== Rebel Alliance Expansions ====
- T-65 X wing Expansion Pack

- BTL-A4 Y wing Expansion Pack

==== Galactic Empire Expansions ====
- TIE/ln Fighter Expansion Pack

- TIE Advanced x1 Expansion Pack

==== Scum & Villainy Expansions ====
- Slave 1 Expansion Pack

- Fang Fighter Expansion Pack

- Lando's Millennium Falcon Expansion Pack

=== Wave 2 ===
Release Date: December 13, 2018

==== Resistance Expansion Packs ====
===== RZ-2 A-wing =====
Pilot Cards
•L'ulo L'ampar	•Tallissan Lintra	•Greer Sonnel	•Zari Bangel	Green Squadron Expert	Blue Squadron Recruit

Upgrades:
Missiles	Talent	Tech
Homing Missile	Heroic	Ferrosphere Paint
Proton Rockets		Primed Thrusters

Tokens:
Evade Token	Focus Token	ID Token 9 (x3)
Lock Tokens 9 (x3)	Shield Tokens (x2)	Small Single Turret Arc Indicator
Standard Charge Tokens (x4)	Stress Tokens (x3)	Dial ID Token
RZ-2 A-Wing Dial		

===== T-70 X-wing =====
Pilot Cards
•Poe Dameron	•Ello Asty	•Kare Kun	•Jessika Pava	•Temmin Wexley	•Nien Numb
•Joph Seastriker	•Lieutenant Bastian	•Jaycris Tubb	Black Squadron Ace	Red Squadron Expert	Blue Squadron Rookie

Upgrades:
Astromechs	Configurations	Tech	Title
•BB-8	Integrated S-Foils	Targeting Synchronizer	•Black One
BB Astromech			
•M9-G8			

Tokens:
Critical Damage Token	Evade Tokens (x2)	Focus Token
ID Tokens 12 (x3)	Ion Tokens	Lock Tokens 12 (x2)
Shield Tokens (x3)	Standard Charge Tokens (x4)	Stress Token
Weapons Disabled Token	Dial ID Token	T-70 X-Wing Dial

==== First Order Expansion Packs ====
===== TIE/fo Fighter =====
Pilot Cards
•"Midnight"	•Commander Malarus	•"Scorch"	•"Static"	•"Longshot"	Omega Squadron Ace
•"Muse"	•TN-3465	Zeta Squadron Pilot	•Lieutenant Rivas	Epsilon Squadron Cadet	•"Null"

Upgrades:
Talent	Tech
Fanatical	Advanced Optics
•Squad Leader	Targeting Synchronizer
Swarm Tactics	

Tokens:
Critical Damage Token	Evade Tokens	Focus Token
ID Tokens 13 (x3)	Shield Token	Standard Charge Tokens (x3)
Stress Tokens (x2)	Dial ID Token	TIE/fo Fighter Dial

==== Scum & Villainy Expansion Pack ====
===== Mining Guild TIE =====
Pilot Cards
•Foreman Proach	•Ahhav	•Captain Seevor	•Overseer Yushyn	Mining Guild Surveyor	Mining Guild Sentry

Upgrades:
Modification	Talent
Hull Upgrade	Elusive
Static Discharge Vanes	Swarm Tactics
	Trick Shot

Tokens:
Critical Damage Token	Evade Tokens	Focus Token
ID Tokens 10 (x3)	Jam Token	Lock Tokens 10 (x2)
Standard Charge Token	Stress Token	Tractor Token
Dial ID Token	Modified TIE/ln Fighter Dial	

=== Wave 3 ===
Release Date: March 21, 2019

==== Republic Expansion Packs ====
===== Guardians of the Republic Expansion Pack =====
====== Delta-7 Aethersprite ======
Pilot Cards
•Obi-Wan Kenobi	•Plo Koon	•Mace Windu	•Saesee Tiin	Jedi Knight

====== V-19 Torrent ======
Pilot Cards
•"Oddball"	•"Kickback"	•"Swoop"	•"Axe"	•"Tucker"	Blue Squadron Protector (x2)	Gold Squadron Trooper (x2)

Upgrades:
Astromechs	Configuration	Configuration and Modification	Force	Talents	Missiles	Modifications
R4 Astromech	Delta-7B	Calibrated Laser Targeting	Battle Meditation	Composure (x2)	Cluster Missiles (x2)	Afterburners (x2)
R4-P Astromech			Brilliant Evasion	Crack Shot (x2)	Concussion Missiles (x2)	Electronic Baffle
•R4-P17			Predictive Shot	Dedicated (x2)	Homing Missiles (x2)	Munitions Failsafe (x2)
R5 Astromech				Expert Handling (x2)	Proton Rockets (x2)	Spare Parts Canisters
				Intimidation (x2)		Static Discharge Vanes
				•Lone Wolf		Stealth Device (x2)
				Marksmanship (x2)		Synchronized Console (x3)
				Saturations Salvo (x2)		
				Swarm Tactics (x2)		
				Trick Shot (x2)		

Tokens:
Charge Tokens (x12)	Critical Hit Tokens (x3)	Evade Tokens (x3)
Focus Tokens (x3)	Force Tokens (x3)	ID Tokens 10 (x3)
ID Tokens 11 (x3)	ID Tokens 12 (x3)	Ion Tokens (x3)
Lock Tokens 10 (x2)	Lock Tokens 11 (x2)	Lock Tokens 12 (x2)
Shield Tokens (x2)	Strain Tokens (x3)	Stress Tokens (x3)
Spare Parts Obstacle Token	Gas Cloud Obstacle Tokens (x3)	Dial ID Tokens
Delta-7 Aethersprite Dial	V-19 Torrent Dial (x2)	

NOTE: Late into the production process, an error was found on the V-19 Torrent Dials. Corrected dial fronts, with the correct maneuvers, were shipped in this box in a separate plastic bag.

===== ARC-170 Starfighter =====
Pilot Cards
•"Oddball"	•"Wolffe"	•"Jag"	•"Sinker"	Squad Seven Veteran	104th Battalion Pilot

Upgrades:
Astromechs	Crew	Gunner	Modification	Talents	Torpedoes
R3 Astromech	•Chancellor Palpatine	•Clone Commander Cody	Synchronized Console	Dedicated	Proton Torpedoes
•R4-P44	•Darth Sidious	Seventh Fleet Gunner		Expert Handling	Ion Torpedoes
	Novice Technician	Veteran Tail Gunner			
	Perceptive Copilot				
	Seasoned Navigator				

Tokens:
Charge Tokens (x5)	Calculate Tokens (x2)	Critical Hit Token
Disarm Token	Focus Tokens (x2)	Force Token
ID Tokens 15 (x3)	Ion Tokens (x3)	Lock Tokens 15 (x2)
Shield Tokens (x3)	Strain Tokens (x2)	Stress Token
Dial ID Tokens	ARC-170 Starfighter Dial	

===== Delta-7 Aethersprite =====
Pilot Cards
•Anakin Skywalker	•Luminara Unduli	•Barriss Offee	•Ahsoka Tano	Jedi Knight

Upgrades:
Force	Configuration	Astromech	Configuration and Modification
Battle Meditation	Delta-7B	R3 Astromech	Calibrated Laser Targeting
Brilliant Evasion		R4-P Astromech	

Tokens:
ID Tokens 16 (x3)	Shield Tokens (x3)	Lock Tokens (x2)
Charge Tokens (x2)	Focus Token	Stress Token
Force Tokens (x3)	Dial ID Token	Delta-7 Aethersprite Dial

==== Separatist Alliance Expansion Packs ====
===== Servants of Strife Expansion Pack =====
====== Belbullab-22 Starfighter ======
Pilot Cards
•General Grievous	•Wat Tambor	•Captain Sear	Skakoan Ace	Feethan Ottraw Autopilot

====== Vulture Class Droid Fighter ======
Pilot Cards
•DFS-081	•••Precise Hunter (x2)	Separatist Drone (x2)	••Hoar Chall Prototype (x2)	Trade Federation Drone (x2)

Upgrades:
Configuration	Talents	Missiles	Modifications	Tactical Relay	Titles	
Grappling Struts (x2)	Composure (x2)	Cluster Missiles (x2)	Afterburners (x3)	•Kraken	•Soulless One	Afterburners (x2)
	Crack Shot (x2)	Concussion Missiles (x2)	Electronic Baffle (x2)	•TV-94		
	Daredevil (x2)	Energy Shell Charges	Impervium Plating			
	Intimidation (x2)	Homing Missiles (x2)	Munitions Failsafe (x2)			
	Juke(x2)	Proton Rockets (x2)	Static Discharge Vanes (x3)			
	•Lone Wolf		Stealth Device (x3)			
	Marksmanship (x2)					
	Swarm Tactics (x2)					
	Treacherous (x2)					
	Trick Shot (x2)					

Tokens:
Charge Tokens (x12)	Calculate Tokens (x12)	Critical Hit Tokens (x3)
Disarm Tokens (x3)	Focus Tokens (x2)	ID Tokens 7 (x3)
ID Tokens 8 (x3)	ID Tokens 9 (x3)	Ion Tokens (x2)
Lock Tokens 7 (x2)	Lock Tokens 8 (x2)	Lock Tokens 9 (x2)
Shield Tokens (x2)	Strain Tokens (x4)	Stress Tokens (x3)
Gas Cloud Obstacle Tokens (x3)	Dial ID Tokens	Belbullab-22 Starfighter Dial
Vulture-class Droid Fighter Dial (x2)		

== Other Supplies & Accessories ==
- X-Wing: Dice Pack
- Star Wars Dice (Dice rolling app for IOS and Android)
- X-Wing: Deluxe Movement Tools and Range Ruler
- Playmats:

- X-Wing: Death Star Assault Playmat
- X-Wing: Starfield Playmat
- X-Wing: Death Star II Playmat
- X-Wing: Bespin Playmat
- X-Wing: Starkiller Base Playmat
- X-Wing: Battle of Hoth Playmat

- Damage Decks:

- X-Wing: Rebel Alliance Damage Deck
- X-Wing: Galactic Empire Damage Deck
- X-Wing: Scum and Villainy Damage Deck
- X-Wing: Resistance Damage Deck
- X-Wing: First Order Damage Deck
- X-Wing: Galactic Republic Damage Deck
- X-Wing: Separatist Alliance Damage Deck

- Maneuver Dial Upgrade Kits:

- X-Wing: Rebel Alliance Maneuver Dial Upgrade Kit
- X-Wing: Galactic Empire Maneuver Dial Upgrade Kit
- X-Wing: Scum and Villainy Maneuver Dial Upgrade Kit
- X-Wing: Resistance Maneuver Dial Upgrade Kit
- X-Wing: First Order Maneuver Dial Upgrade Kit
- X-Wing: Galactic Republic Maneuver Dial Upgrade Kit
- X-Wing: Separatist Alliance Maneuver Dial Upgrade Kit

== See also ==
- Galac-Tac
- Star Wars Miniatures Battles
- Starweb
