= 2017 Origins Award winners =

List of award recipients

The following are the winners of the 44th annual (2017) Origins Award, presented at Origins 2018:

Category	Winner	Company	Designer(s)
Game of the Year	Gloomhaven	Cephalofair	
Best Board Game	Gloomhaven	Cephalofair	
Best Card Game	Ex Libris	Renegade Game Studios	
Best Family Game	Azul	Plan B Games	
Best Miniatures Game	Warhammer 40,000 8th Edition	Games Workshop	
Best Collectible Game	Star Wars Destiny: Awakenings Booster Pack	Fantasy Flight Games	
Best Role-Playing Game	Adventures in Middle-earth	Cubicle 7	
Best Role-Playing Game Supplement	Dungeons & Dragons: Xanathar's Guide to Everything	Wizards of the Coast	
Best Game Accessory	Terraforming Mars Organizer	The Broken Token	

== Fan Favorites ==
Category	Winner	Company	Designer(s)
Fan Favorite Board Game	Gloomhaven	Cephalofair	
Fan Favorite Card Game	Hero Realms	White Wizard Games	
Fan Favorite Family Game	Azul	Plan B Games	
Fan Favorite Miniatures Game	Warhammer 40,000 8th Edition	Games Workshop	
Fan Favorite Collectible Game	Star Wars Destiny: Awakenings Booster Pack	Fantasy Flight Games	
Fan Favorite Role-Playing Game	Starfinder	Paizo	
Fan Favorite Role-Playing Game Supplement	Dungeons & Dragons: Xanathar's Guide to Everything	Wizards of the Coast	
Fan Favorite Game Accessory	Terraforming Mars Organizer	The Broken Token	

== Academy of Adventure Gaming Arts & Design Hall of Fame ==
Eric M. Lang and Ken St. Andre
