= SXSW Gaming Awards =

Video game award

- Awarded for: Outstanding achievements in the video game industry
- Country: United States
- First award: March 7, 2014; 12 years ago
- Final award: March 12, 2022; 4 years ago
- Website: sxsw.com/awards/gaming-awards

The SXSW Gaming Awards were awards given to video games during the annual South by Southwest Festival (SXSW), held in Austin, Texas typically in March of that year. The Awards were part of the SXSW Gaming Expo which is part of the SXSW Interactive branch of the festival.

== History ==
Video games had been part of the SXSW within the SXSW Interactive branch. in 2006, the festival launched "Screenburn" as a special portion of the Interactive branch for video games, and later renamed this to SXSW Gaming in 2013.

Matthew Crump, a veteran game developer, joined SXSW in 2012 and spearheaded the efforts to create the SXSW Gaming Awards to premiere during the 2014 festival. The new awards in fifteen different categories were announced in September 2013 to be awarded during the 2014 festival. However, Crump died from a heart attack just before the festival. The event organizers opted to rename the "Cultural Innovation in Gaming" to the "Matthew Crump Cultural Innovation Award" to honor Crump's contributions to the festival.

The Gaming Awards were discontinued by SXSW in 2023 due to a desire to "streamline our festival a bit more."

== Format ==
Developers and publishers must submit their games for consideration to the festival organizers prior to a deadline; these games generally must have had public release in the preceding calendar year to the festival (for example, for the inaugural 2014 awards, games had to be released in 2013).

The festival's organizers along with a panel of industry experts review all submissions and select the top five for each of the game categories. These are then opened to public voting for the final winner for each award to be chosen.

The Gamer's Voice awards are exceptional to these: they are limited only to indie games released in the previous calendar year or the current year, and which any member of the public may nominate. The festival organizers select multiple games (typically more than five) after playing through each as nominees for the award. These games are featured in playable form at the SXSW festival to allow attendees to try them before they vote for their favorite.

The awards ceremony is held near the end of the SXSW event, with celebrity and gaming hosts presenting the awards.

The 2020 SXSW event was cancelled in light of the COVID-19 pandemic, but the award winners were still named online on March 24, 2020.

== Ceremonies ==
Year	Date	Location	Hosts
2014	March 7	Long Center for the Performing Arts, Austin, TX	Justine "iJustine" Ezarik and Smosh
2015	March 14	Austin City Limits Live at The Moody Theater, Austin, TX	Janet Varney and Mark Edward "Markiplier" Fischbach
2016	March 19	Hilton Austin Downtown, Austin, TX	Séan "Jacksepticeye" William McLoughlin and Rachel "Seltzer" Quirico
2017	March 18	Hilton Austin Downtown, Austin, TX	OMGitsfirefoxx and Xavier Woods
2018	March 17	Hilton Austin Downtown, Austin, TX	Alanah Pearce and Rich Campbell
2019	March 16	Hilton Austin Downtown, Austin, TX	Lindsay Jones and Alex Corea
2020	March 24	None	None
2021	March 20	None	None
2022	March 12	None	None

== Awards ==
=== Video Game of the Year ===
This award was named "Game of the Year" in 2014, but was renamed when the Mobile and Tabletop awards were added.

- 2014 – The Last of Us, Naughty Dog
- 2015 – Dragon Age: Inquisition, BioWare
- 2016 – The Witcher 3: Wild Hunt, CD Projekt Red
- 2017 – Uncharted 4: A Thief's End, Naughty Dog
- 2018 – The Legend of Zelda: Breath of the Wild, Nintendo
- 2019 – God of War, Sony Interactive Entertainment
- 2020 – Sekiro: Shadows Die Twice, FromSoftware/Activision
- 2021 – Hades, Supergiant Games
- 2022 – Final Fantasy XIV: Endwalker, Square Enix

=== Tabletop Game of the Year ===
- 2015 – Star Realms, White Wizard Games
- 2016 – Pandemic Legacy, Z-Man Games
- 2017 – Arkham Horror: The Card Game, Fantasy Flight Games
- 2018 – Gloomhaven, Cephalofair Games
- 2019 – Root, Leder Games
- 2020 – Paladins of the West Kingdom, Renegade Game Studios
- 2021 – The Search for Planet X, Renegade Game Studios
- 2022 – Dune: Imperium, Dire Wolf Digital

=== XR Game of the Year ===
Formally "VR Game of the Year" prior 2020

- 2018 – Resident Evil 7: Biohazard, Capcom
- 2019 – Beat Saber, Beat Games
- 2020 – No Man's Sky VR, Hello Games
- 2021 – Half-Life: Alyx, Valve Corporation
- 2022 – Resident Evil IV VR, Armature Studio/Oculus Studios

=== Indie Game of the Year ===
- 2021 – Deep Rock Galactic, Ghost Ship Games/Coffee Stain Publishing
- 2022 – Kena: Bridge of Spirits, Ember Lab

=== Matthew Crump Cultural Innovation Award ===
Awarded for a game that challenges the normal idea of video gaming, offering a culturally innovative view of the world

- 2014 – Papers, Please, 3909 LLC
- 2015 – This War of Mine, 11 bit studios
- 2016 – Undertale, tobyfox
- 2017 – That Dragon, Cancer, Numinious Games
- 2018 – Doki Doki Literature Club!, Team Salvato
- 2019 – Celeste, Matt Makes Games
- 2020 – Disco Elysium, ZA/UM
- 2021 – Dreams, Media Molecule/Sony Interactive Entertainment
- 2022 – Unpacking, Witch Beam/Humble Bundle

=== Excellence in Animation, Art, and Visual Achievement ===
Combined the three former awards.

- 2021 – Ghost of Tsushima, Sucker Punch Productions/Sony Interactive Entertainment
- 2022 – Forza Horizon 5, Playground Games/Xbox Game Studios

=== Excellence in Audio Design ===
- 2021 – Doom Eternal - id Software/Bethesda Softworks
- 2022 – Resident Evil Village, Capcom

=== Excellence in Game Design ===
Formerly "Excellence in Design and Direction"

- 2014 – Tearaway, Media Molecule
- 2015 – Middle-earth: Shadow of Mordor, Monolith Productions
- 2016 – Bloodborne, FromSoftware
- 2017 – Dishonored 2, Arkane Studios
- 2018 – The Legend of Zelda: Breath of the Wild, Nintendo
- 2019 – God of War, Sony Interactive Entertainment
- 2020 – Control, Remedy Entertainment/505 Games
- 2021 – Hades, Supergiant Games
- 2022 – Inscryption, Daniel Mullins/Devolver Digital

=== Excellence in Original Score ===
Formerly "Excellence in Musical Score"

- 2014 – The Last of Us, Naughty Dog
- 2015 – Transistor, Supergiant Games
- 2016 – Ori and the Blind Forest, Moon Studios
- 2017 – Doom, id Software
- 2018 – Nier: Automata, PlatinumGames
- 2019 – Tetris Effect, Enhance, Inc.
- 2020 – Death Stranding, Kojima Productions/Sony Interactive Entertainment
- 2021 – Ori and the Will of the Wisps, Moon Studios/Xbox Game Studios
- 2022 – Final Fantasy XIV: Endwalker, Square Enix

=== Excellence in Multiplayer ===
Formally "Best Multiplayer Game" until 2016

- 2014 – Super Mario 3D World, Nintendo
- 2015 – Super Smash Bros. for Wii U, Nintendo
- 2016 – Rocket League, Psyonix
- 2017 – Overwatch, Blizzard Entertainment
- 2018 – PlayerUnknown's Battlegrounds, PUBG Corp.
- 2019 – Fortnite, Epic Games
- 2020 – Final Fantasy XIV: Shadowbringers, Square Enix
- 2021 – Deep Rock Galactic, Ghost Ship Games/Coffee Stain Publishing
- 2022 – It Takes Two, Hazelight Studios/Electronic Arts

=== Excellence in Narrative ===
- 2014 – The Last of Us, Naughty Dog
- 2015 – The Wolf Among Us, Telltale Games
- 2016 – The Witcher 3: Wild Hunt, CD Projekt Red
- 2017 – Uncharted 4: A Thief's End, Naughty Dog
- 2018 – What Remains of Edith Finch, Giant Sparrow
- 2019 – Detroit: Become Human, Sony Interactive Entertainment
- 2020 – Disco Elysium, ZA/UM
- 2021 – The Last of Us Part II, Naughty Dog/Sony Interactive Entertainment
- 2022 – Final Fantasy XIV: Endwalker, Square Enix

=== Excellence in Technical Achievement ===
- 2014 – Grand Theft Auto V, Rockstar Games
- 2015 – Destiny, Bungie
- 2016 – The Witcher 3: Wild Hunt, CD Projekt Red
- 2017 – Battlefield 1, EA DICE
- 2018 – Nier: Automata, PlatinumGames
- 2019 – Red Dead Redemption 2, Rockstar Games
- 2020 – Death Stranding, Kojima Productions/Sony Interactive Entertainment
- 2021 – Microsoft Flight Simulator, Asobo Studio/Xbox Game Studios
- 2022 – Ratchet & Clank: Rift Apart, Insomniac Games/Sony Interactive Entertainment

== Retired awards ==
=== Excellence in Animation ===
- 2014 – Ni No Kuni: Wrath of the White Witch, Namco Bandai
- 2015 – Middle-earth: Shadow of Mordor, Monolith Productions
- 2016 – Rise of the Tomb Raider, Crystal Dynamics
- 2017 – Uncharted 4: A Thief's End, Naughty Dog
- 2018 – Cuphead, StudioMDHR
- 2019 – Marvel's Spider-Man, Sony Interactive Entertainment
- 2020 – Kingdom Hearts III – Square Enix

=== Excellence in Art ===
- 2014 – BioShock Infinite, Irrational Games
- 2015 – Child of Light, Ubisoft
- 2016 – Bloodborne, FromSoftware
- 2017 – Firewatch, Campo Santo
- 2018 – Cuphead, StudioMDHR
- 2019 – Octopath Traveler, Nintendo
- 2020 – The Legend of Zelda: Link's Awakening, Nintendo

=== Excellence in Gaming Marketing ===
- 2014 – Assassin’s Creed IV: Black Flag, Ubisoft

=== Excellence in Convergence ===
Awarded for a game that exemplifies crossover medium appeal. Formally the "Convergence Award" until 2016

- 2014 – Injustice: Gods Among Us, Warner Bros. Interactive
- 2015 – South Park: The Stick of Truth, Obsidian Entertainment
- 2016 – Batman: Arkham Knight, Rocksteady Studios
- 2017 – Batman: The Telltale Series, Telltale Games
- 2018 – Star Wars Battlefront II, EA DICE
- 2019 – Marvel's Spider-Man, Sony Interactive Entertainment

=== Excellence in Gameplay ===
- 2014 – Brothers: A Tale of Two Sons, 505 Studios
- 2015 – Middle-earth: Shadow of Mordor, Monolith Productions
- 2016 – Metal Gear Solid V: The Phantom Pain, Kojima Productions
- 2017 – Doom, id Software
- 2018 – The Legend of Zelda: Breath of the Wild, Nintendo
- 2019 – Super Smash Bros. Ultimate, Nintendo
- 2020 – Devil May Cry 5, Capcom

=== Excellence in SFX ===
- 2014 – The Last of Us, Naughty Dog
- 2015 – Alien: Isolation, Creative Assembly
- 2016 – Star Wars Battlefront, EA DICE
- 2017 – Battlefield 1, EA DICE
- 2018 – Super Mario Odyssey, Nintendo
- 2019 – Red Dead Redemption 2, Rockstar Games
- 2020 – Star Wars Jedi: Fallen Order, Respawn Entertainment/Electronic Arts

=== Excellence in Visual Achievement ===
- 2015 – Far Cry 4, Ubisoft
- 2016 – The Order: 1886, Ready at Dawn
- 2017 – Uncharted 4: A Thief's End, Naughty Dog
- 2018 – Horizon Zero Dawn, Guerrilla Games
- 2019 – God of War, Sony Interactive Entertainment
- 2020 – Sekiro: Shadows Die Twice, FromSoftware/Activision

=== Mobile Game of the Year ===
- 2015 – Hearthstone: Heroes of Warcraft, Blizzard Entertainment
- 2016 – Her Story, Sam Barlow
- 2017 – Pokémon Go, Niantic
- 2018 – Fire Emblem Heroes, Nintendo
- 2019 – Donut County, Annapurna Interactive
- 2020 – Sky: Children of the Light, Thatgamecompany

=== Most Promising New Intellectual Property ===
- 2016 – Splatoon, Nintendo
- 2017 – Overwatch, Blizzard Entertainment
- 2018 – Horizon Zero Dawn, Guerrilla Games
- 2019 – Beat Saber, Beat Games
- 2020 – The Outer Worlds, Obsidian Entertainment/Private Division

=== Trending Game of the Year ===
- 2017 – Overwatch, Blizzard Entertainment
- 2018 – PlayerUnknown's Battlegrounds, PUBG Corp.
- 2019 – Red Dead Redemption 2, Rockstar Games
- 2020 – Pokémon Sword and Shield, Game Freak/The Pokémon Company, Nintendo

=== Texas Arts Achievement ===
Awarded to a Texas-based studio or game

- 2014 – Galactic Cafe

=== Most Valuable Character ===
- 2015 – Ellie, The Last of Us
- 2016 – Lara Croft, Rise of the Tomb Raider
- 2017 – Nathan Drake, Uncharted 4: A Thief's End, Naughty Dog

=== Most Promising New Esports Game ===
Formerly "Esports Game of the Year" until 2019.

- 2017 – Overwatch, Blizzard Entertainment
- 2018 – PlayerUnknown's Battlegrounds, PUBG Corp.
- 2019 – Fortnite, Epic Games

=== Most Valuable eSports Team ===
- 2015 – Cloud9
- 2016 – Evil Geniuses

=== Most Valuable Online Channel ===
- 2015 – Rooster Teeth

=== Most Entertaining Online Personality ===
- 2016 – Greg Miller, Kinda Funny

=== Most Valuable Add-On Content ===
- 2015 – Left Behind, The Last of Us

=== Most Anticipated Crowdfunded Game ===
- 2015 – Star Citizen

=== Most Fulfilling Community-Funded Game ===
Formerly "Most Fulfilling Crowdfunded Game" until 2018.

- 2016 – Undertale, tobyfox
- 2017 – Starbound, Chucklefish
- 2018 – Night in the Woods, Infinite Fall
- 2019 – CrossCode, Deck13

=== Most Evolved Game ===
- 2019 – No Man's Sky Next, Hello Games

=== Fan Creation of the Year ===
- 2017 – Brutal Doom 64, Sergeant_Mark_IV

=== Gamer's Voice Award ===
Award to an indie game voted by the public; split into Single and Multi-player categories in 2016.

- 2014 – Nidhogg, Messhof
- 2015 – SpeedRunners, DoubleDutch Games

==== Single Player ====
- 2016 – Superhot, Superhot Team
- 2017 – Owlboy, D-Pad Studio

==== Multiplayer ====
- 2016 – Gang Beasts, Boneloaf
- 2017 – Arena Gods, Supertype Games

==== VR ====
- 2019 – Intruders: Hide & Seek, Tessera Studios
