= Hero Realms =

Card-based deck building game

- Designer: Rob Dougherty; Darwin Kastle
- Publisher: Wise Wizard Games
- Players: 2 to 4
- Age range: 12 and up
- Playing time: 20 minutes
- Website: herorealms.com

Hero Realms is a 2016 fantasy card-based deck building tabletop game designed by Rob Dougherty and Darwin Kastle and published by Wise Wizard Games. In the game, the player has to defeat opponents by purchasing cards using gold coins that deal damage points until the opponent's health points reach zero. The game features four factions of cards, which can either deal damage, give health points, or give the player a number of coins.

The game was initiated as a Kickstarter campaign in 2016 and was released the same year. Wise Wizard Games later released expansions for the game, a free-to-play video game for Windows, iOS, and Android platforms, and a spin-off, titled Hero Realms Dungeons. The game received positive reception from critics; it was also nominated for two Golden Geek Awards and won the Origins Award for the category Fan Favorite Card Game.

== Gameplay ==
The goal of the game is to defeat an opponent using cards that deal damage points such as shown in this image

Hero Realms is a fantasy card-based deck-building tabletop game with role-playing elements, which can be played between two and four players. Each player starts with 50 health points and 10 cards, including a shortsword and dagger; additional cards can be bought from the market throughout the game with gold coins. The game features role-playing elements such as four factions of cards, colored red, green, blue, and yellow. Every faction offers cards that can deal damage, give health points, or give the player a number of coins. Each player can attack another with cards dealing damage points, such as a shortsword, dagger, or a card bought from the market. When a player's health points reach zero, they are out of the game. Another type of cards are champions, divided into guards and non-guards, which when drawn remain in play indefinitely until another player takes the card down. A guard is a type of card that has defense points who protects the player and non-guard champions from being attacked.

The game's rules are similar to those of other deck-building games like Star Realms, Ascension, and Dominion. Star Realms differs from the game for being space-oriented in its looks and not having role-playing elements. The player can form several strategies, such as obtaining a build with combat cards with high damage points, a defense build with champions, or a same-faction build. Besides the base game, there are five additional character packs, including classes such as wizard, cleric, thief, ranger, and fighter, which are sold separately. Depending on the class of the character, each player starts with health points ranging from 50 to 60, and with a different set of card abilities. The game's age range is set to 12 and up. A game of Hero Realms typically lasts about 20 minutes.

In the Hero Realms video game, there are several gamemodes available, such as player vs. player, player vs. enemy, and co-op. A player can also earn experience points after each game and level up. By leveling up, a player can improve their character's abilities. The game is free-to-play and it features microtransactions.

== Development and release ==
Hero Realms was designed by Rob Dougherty and Darwin Kastle and published by Wise Wizard Games (formerly White Wizard Games). After developing Star Realms in 2014, Wise Wizard Games started a Kickstarter campaign for Hero Realms in 2016. The game was released the same year. Expansions to the game titled The Ruin of Thandar Campaign Deck, The Dragon Boss Deck, and The Lich Boss Deck were released in 2017. In 2021, Wise Wizard Games started a Kickstarter campaign for the video game version of Hero Realms; a beta version of the game was released in August 2021, while the full game was released in 2022 for Windows, iOS, and Android platforms. A stand-alone expansion, titled Hero Realms Dungeons, was successfully funded through kickstarter and was scheduled to be released in 2023 but has not been released yet.

== Reception ==
Hero Realms received positive reception from critics. Jerry Williams of RPGFan described it as "a wonderful entry-level investment". The game's additional character packs were also commended by James Floyd Kelly of GeekDad and Raven Winters of GamingTrend. Winters called it "a perfect introduction" to deck-building games and commended the fighter pack for being easy to learn. Winters, however, disliked the base game's art style, but commended the art style of the thief and wizard packs for their art style.

=== Accolades ===
Year	Award	Category	Result	Ref.
2016	Golden Geek Award	Best Card Game	Nominated	
2016	Golden Geek Award	Best 2-Player Board Game	Nominated	
2018	Origins Award	Fan Favorite Card Game	Won	
