= Sheriff of Nottingham (disambiguation) =

The Sheriff of Nottingham is the main antagonist in the legend of Robin Hood.

Sheriff of Nottingham may also refer to:

- Sheriff of Nottingham (board game)
- Sheriff of Nottingham (position), the (now ceremonial) office for the city of Nottingham

== See also ==
- Sheriff of Nottinghamshire, Derbyshire and the Royal Forests, the office for the county of Nottinghamshire from 1068 to 1566
- High Sheriff of Nottinghamshire, the (now ceremonial) office for the county of Nottinghamshire since 1568
