= Pool-building game =

A pool-building game is a game where the players build a pool of items (e.g. cards or dice) throughout the game. Some or all of the items in their pool have a resource which allows other items to be purchased from a set of items that are not in the players pool. These games have frequent recycling methods to allow the purchased items to be drawn and played later in the game.

== Pool item types ==
While there are several different types of items used in the pool, like dice or chips, the pool building genre started with Dominion, where players purchase cards from a common area and they get reshuffled into their decks. When the pool item is a card, the type of game is called a deck-building game.

== Examples ==
- Deck-building: Dominion
- Bag-building: The Quacks of Quedlinburg
- Dice-building: Quarriors!
