= Quarriors! =

Board game

Quarriors! is a pool-building game made by WizKids in which players represent a titular mystical warrior. Players roll dice which gives them "quiddity" (an in-game currency) which allows them to purchase additional Spell Dice or Creature Dice, which can then be used to attack the opponent.

Quarriors was released in 2011 and was a nominee for Dice Tower game of the year, Best family game, and most innovative game of the year.

== Gameplay ==
The games have a lot of variability because the dice that are available to purchase change in each game, so the way they interact can cause a great variety of changes in the game.

It has been praised because of the lack of shuffling needed, as the dice can be readily pulled out of the bag.

== Legacy ==
The game has had several expansions and a port to iOS.

Quarriors! was the basis for WizKids' laterDice Masters series.

== Reception ==
Quarriors has been popular with game players with many people bringing it to events like Gencon and Penny Arcade Expo. Despite not being for sale, or official representation at Penny Arcade Expo 2011, it had a lot of play time.

Quarriors won the Origins Award for "Best Family, Party or Children's Game of 2012".
