= Star Realms =

Tabletop card game

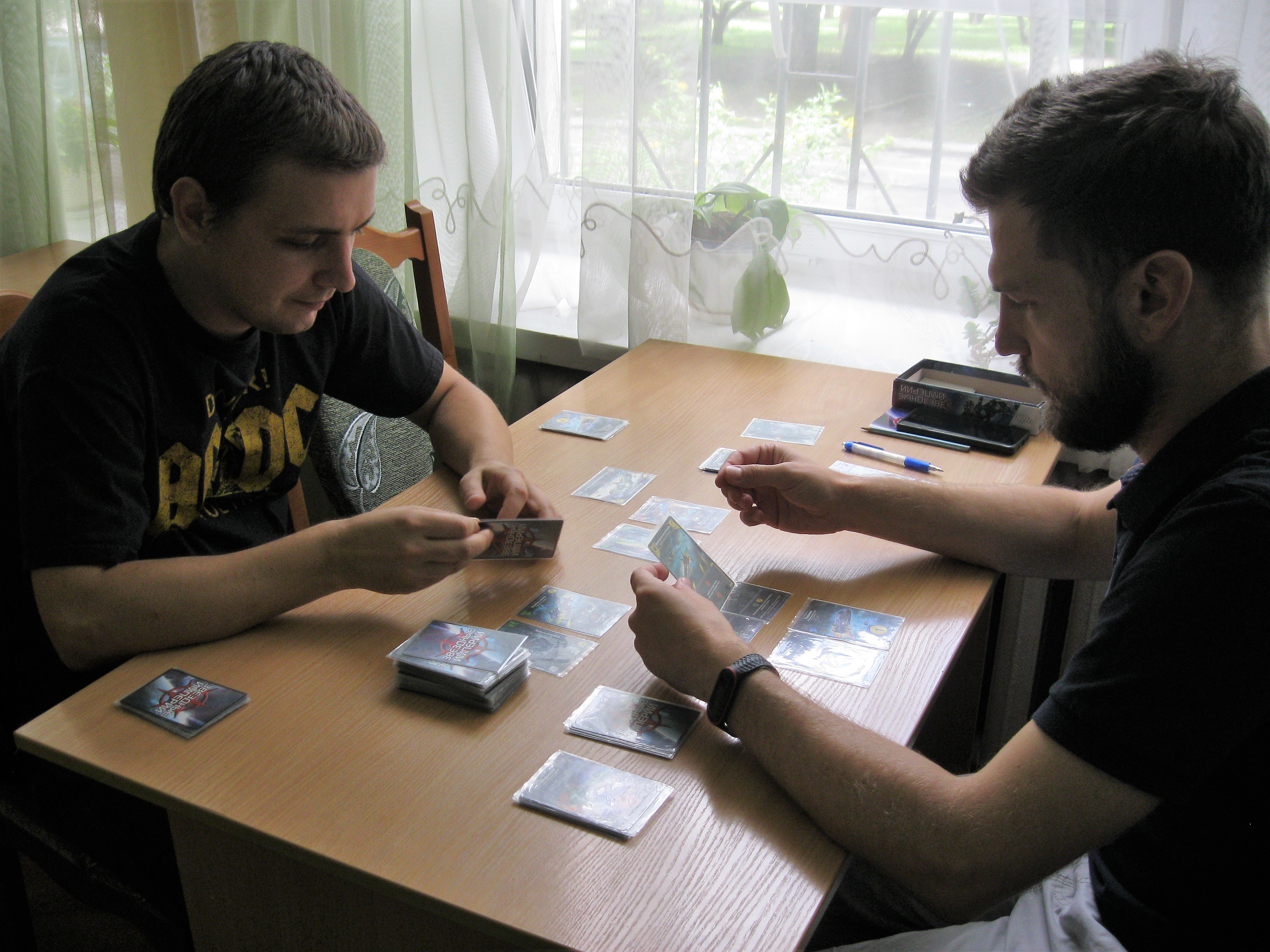
- Star Realms played by two players
- Designers: Rob Dougherty and Darwin Kastle
- Illustrators: Vito Gesualdi
- Publishers: Wise Wizard Games
- Players: 2 to 4 (adding expansions allows the game to support more players)
- Playing time: until one of the players loses all their authority.
- Chance: Card draw
- Age range: 12 and up

Star Realms is a card-based deck-building science-fiction tabletop game, designed by Rob Dougherty and Darwin Kastle and published in 2014 by Wise Wizard Games. The game started out as a Kickstarter campaign in 2013. The goal of Star Realms is to destroy opponents by purchasing cards using "trade" points and using these cards to attack an opponent's "authority" using "combat" points. The game takes place in a distant future where different factions compete to gain resources, trade and outmaneuver each other in a race to become ruler of the galaxy.

Star Realms is similar to other deck-building games, like Ascension and Dominion. The game is marketed as portable and expandable, as it comes in a small box and contains only cards and no dice or markers. In 2016, Wise Wizard Games published a fantasy version of this game called Hero Realms.

== Cards ==
The original game (core set) consists of the following:

- One 80 card Trade Deck (20 each of 4 different factions, described below)
- Two 10 card Personal Decks, consisting of two Vipers and eight Scouts each
- 10 Explorer cards
- 18 double-sided Authority cards for keeping score
- Two Rules Sheets

The cards in the core set are divided over four different factions, each with different benefits or strengths. 20 total cards from each faction appear in Trade Deck, though there are only 11 or 12 different cards in each faction because some cards have more than 1 copy. There are also Unaligned ships, consisting of the Viper and Scout cards from the starting Personal Decks and the Explorer cards.

- The Trade Federation, focused on trade and growth. Specializes in generating Trade, and they are the only faction able to generate authority. 7 ships and 5 bases.
- The Blobs, mysterious alien creatures. Specializes in generating absolutely obscene amounts of Combat and removing undesirable cards from the trade row. 8 ships and 3 bases.
- The Star Empire, former colonies of the Trade Federation. Specializes in Combat and drawing new cards and to force opponent to discard cards. 6 ships and 5 bases.
- The Machine Cult, a cult of technology focused on robotics and computerization. Specializes in removing undesirable cards and defending from opponent's attacks. 7 ships and 5 bases.

All cards have a trade cost, which is used to determine how many trade points the player needs to buy the card. Cards have either a trade value or a combat value or Authority value or a combination, giving the player a boost for purchasing cards, attacking opponents or adding authority to their total. Many cards also have a special ability, e.g. letting the player draw more cards to their hand or forcing an opponent to discard cards. Some cards also have the ability to be scrapped, which removes them from the game entirely but also gives the player some kind of benefit.

Cards are either ships, which are used and then placed in the discard pile at the end of the turn, or bases which are played and stay in play until they are destroyed by an opponent and then discarded. Bases are either a normal base or an outpost. Bases have a grey shield, and provide some kind of benefit but no protection to the player's authority or other bases. Outposts have black shields and act as protection in addition to any benefits. Outposts must be attacked first, before an opponent can attack the player or other bases. An opponent's combat points must be above or equal to the base's shield value to destroy it and move it to the discard pile.

== Setup and placement ==
The "game board" consists only of cards. Each player has their own draw deck to draw new cards from and their own discard pile where they put used cards. In the middle of the table is the "trade row", which holds the cards available for purchase. The trade row holds five cards at all times, plus a deck of "Explorer" cards that are always available for purchase. There is also a trade deck which holds unrevealed cards for purchase and a trash heap where players put cards that are removed from the game.

Each player starts out with a starting personal deck of ten ship cards and 50 points of "authority" cards. The starting deck includes eight "Scout" cards (each generating 1 trade) and two "Viper" cards (each granting 1 combat), the most basic ships. The authority cards indicate how much health the player has left.

== Gameplay ==
At the start of the game the player who goes first draws three cards and the player going second draws five cards. If there are three players, the first one has 3 in their starting hand, the second one has 4, and the third one has 5 cards.

The player whose turn it is then plays the cards from their hand in front of them, each card possibly giving a boost in trade, attack, authority, and/or granting a special ability. At the end of every turn, the player moves all played ship cards to the discard pile, then draws five cards and the next player starts their turn. Whenever the draw deck is empty and a card needs to be drawn, the player shuffles their discard pile and places it face down to form a new draw deck. New cards acquired by purchasing with trade points are first placed in the discard pile and then enter the game when the pile is reshuffled. When a card is purchased it is replaced in the trade row with a new card from the trade deck.

If a card has a scrap symbol (a trash can) it can be scrapped and permanently removed from the game. Other cards also enable cards to be scrapped without activating a scrap ability. In this way, each player builds up their own deck of cards by adding cards from the trade row and removing cards by scrapping. Each drawn hand will give different opportunities for gaining trade points or attacking the opponents with combat points.

== Winning the game ==
In order to win the players need to attack their opponents' authority using combat. If a player's authority is reduced to zero or less they are out of the game.

== Expansions ==
Wise Wizard Games have released many expansion packs plus two standalone expansions for Star Realms. Some expansions/promo cards were only available to backers of the Kickstarter campaign while other expansions are available to the public. There are some differences between the online Gambit expansion and the collectible cards.

Standalone Expansions

- Star Realms: Colony Wars (2015) - Includes new 80 card trade deck plus two 10 card starter decks for the players. When combined with the base game (or Frontiers), allows for 3 to 6 player games.
- Star Realms: Frontiers (2018) - Includes new 80 card trade deck plus four 10 card starter decks for the players. When combined with the base game (or Colony Wars), allows for 5 to 6 player games.

Expansion Packs

- Star Realms: Crisis
  - Bases & Battleships (2014) - 12 card expansion with new bases and ships.
  - Events (2014) - 12 event cards shuffled into the trade deck that have special effects when they are turned up into the trade row.
  - Fleets & Fortresses (2014) - 12 card expansion with new bases and ships.
  - Heroes (2014) - 12 hero cards that when purchased from the trade row immediately go into play and boost your game play.
- Star Realms: Gambit Set (2014) - 10 Gambit cards, 1 or 2 of which are dealt to each player at the beginning of the game and kept hidden. They can be played during the game for a bonus for the player, 3 copies of a new unaligned ship, and 4 cards describing Solo or Co-op challenges.
- Star Realms: Cosmic Gambit Set (2015) - 13 new Gambit cards, 1 or 2 of which are dealt to each player at the beginning of the game, and 1 new unaligned base. This card is place into play as a result of a Gambit card, and is scrapped when destroyed.
- Star Realms: United
  - Assault (2016) - 12 card expansion with new bases and ships, including cards with two factions.
  - Command (2016) - 12 card expansion with new bases and ships, including cards with two factions.
  - Heroes (2016) - 12 new hero cards that when purchased from the trade row immediately go into play and boost your game play.
  - Missions (2016) - 12 mission cards (3 are dealt to each player at the beginning of the game), which when completed by the player are revealed. When all 3 are completed and revealed the player wins the game.
- Star Realms: Promo Pack 1 (2016) - 15 card expansion with new bases and ships.
- Star Realms: Promo Pack 2 (2017) - 12 card expansion with new ships.
- Star Realms: Scenarios (2018) - 20 scenario cards (1 used each game) which change how the game is played.
- Star Realms Command Decks
  - The Alliance (2018) - 18 card expansion with 1 legendary commander, 12 card starter deck, 2 gambit cards, 1 mega ship and 2 score cards.
  - The Alignment (2018) - 18 card expansion with 1 legendary commander, 12 card starter deck, 2 gambit cards, 1 mega ship and 2 score cards.
  - The Coalition (2018) - 18 card expansion with 1 legendary commander, 12 card starter deck, 2 gambit cards, 1 mega ship and 2 score cards.
  - The Pact (2018) - 18 card expansion with 1 legendary commander, 12 card starter deck, 2 gambit cards, 1 mega ship and 2 score cards.
  - The Union (2018) - 18 card expansion with 1 legendary commander, 12 card starter deck, 2 gambit cards, 1 mega ship and 2 score cards.
  - The Unity (2018) - 18 card expansion with 1 legendary commander, 12 card starter deck, 2 gambit cards, 1 mega ship and 2 score cards.
  - Lost Fleet (2018) - 18 card expansion with 1 legendary commander, 12 card starter deck, 2 gambit cards, 1 mega ship and 2 score cards.
- Star Realms: Stellar Allies (2018) - 12 card expansion with new bases and ships.
- Star Realms: Frontiers Kickstarter Promo Pack (2018) - 41 card expansion with new bases and ships, as well as new event cards. Split into two expansions in the mobile app as "Frontiers Events" and "Frontiers Promos."
- Star Realms: High Alert
  - Heroes (2021) - 12 new hero cards that when purchased from the trade row immediately go into play and boost your game play.
  - Invasion (2021) - 12 card expansion with new bases and ships.
  - Requisition (2021) - 12 card expansion with new bases and ships, some of which cost less if cards of that faction have been played that turn.
  - Tech (2021) - 12 tech cards that provide abilities that can be activated each turn.
  - First Strike (2021) - 22 card expansion with new bases and ships, and two new tech cards.

== Digital game ==
Star Realms has also been released as a digital game for Android, iOS, Mac and Windows.

There are 2 gameplay differences between the games:

1. The digital version has an unlimited number of purchasable Explorers while the physical card game only has 10 Explorer cards. Although the Explorers were always intended to be unlimited for most games, the 10 provided can replicate an unlimited stack by either reusing scrapped Explorer cards, or in a game where players have run out of Explorers the players can use a proxy or decide that players can't buy any more until somebody scraps one.
2. Cards with ally abilities that include draw effects trigger immediately upon another card of the same faction entering play, rather than at the discretion of the player.

The digital game allows the player to play against other players online or play scenarios of varying difficulty against an AI.

== Awards ==
Star Realms has won many notable table top gaming awards, including:

2014 Golden Geek Awards (as voted by the members of BoardGameGeek.com)

- Best 2-Player Game
- Best Card Game
- Best Indie Game
- Best Mobile / Handheld Game

2014 Dice Tower Gaming Awards

- Best Small Publisher (Wise Wizard Games for Star Realms)
- Best Two-Player Game

2014 Origins Awards

- Fan Favorite Card Game

2015 SXSW's Table Top Game of the Year
