= Star Wars: The Deckbuilding Game =

Deck-building card game

- Box art
- Designers: Caleb Grace
- Publishers: Fantasy Flight Games; Asmodee
- Publication: March 3, 2023
- Genres: Board game Deckbuilding game
- Players: 2
- Playing time: ~30 minutes

Star Wars: The Deckbuilding Game is a deckbuilding game released by Fantasy Flight Games and Asmodee on March 3, 2023.

== Gameplay ==
Each player controls a base that represent that player's life pool, and is able to obtain another base if theirs is destroyed. The object is to destroy three bases to win the game, which is achieved by attacking the opposing player.

On their turn, a player uses the resources from the five cards in their hand to obtain new cards from a central "galaxy row", which contains cards of the Empire and Rebel factions. The player may only select from cards of their faction, and the galaxy row is reconstituted with cards from the "galaxy deck".

One innovate game mechanic is the ability of a player to attack cards still in the galaxy row before they have been obtained by other players, known as sabotage for the Rebel faction and bounty hunting for the Empire faction. These provide a reward to the player taking that action, and also deny other players from obtaining targeted cards.

Throughout the game, a Force meter records the balance in the Force, which may alter the effect of cards in favour of a particular faction.

== Reception ==
The game was generally well received. Charlie Hill of Polygon called it "absolutely brilliant". Aaron Zimmerman stated in a review for Ars Technica that the artwork is "top-notch" and the card stock is of good quality.
