= Sheriff of Nottingham (board game) =

Multiplayer board game

- Designers: Sergio Halaban, Bryan Pope, Andre Zatz
- Illustrators: David Kegg
- Publishers: [Arcane Wonders] (2014)
- Systems: Bluffing
- Players: 3-5
- Playing time: 60 minutes
- Chance: Moderate to high
- Skills: Bluffing, bribes, subtlety

Sheriff of Nottingham is a multiplayer bluffing board game designed by Sergio Halaban, Bryan Pope, Andre Zatz and originally published by Arcane Wonders as the first in their Dice Tower Essentials line. Sheriff of Nottingham was released on October 10, 2014. In the game, players take turns acting as the Sheriff while the other players try to bring goods into the city. Players must declare what goods they have in their bag and the Sheriff may choose to let them pass or inspect their goods to see if they are carrying the goods they claim. A player may lie, bribe, or mislead to get the most points scoring goods into the city without being caught.

== Game play ==
Players choose a color and select the matching board. Each player starts with 50 gold. Goods cards are then shuffled and six cards are dealt to each player with the rest going to the center of the table face down. The player with the most real cash on them will be the Sheriff first. Each round, all players not currently the sheriff have the opportunity to visit the market- where they can discard up to five of their cards and then replace those cards either with the top cards of the discard pile, or by drawing from the deck. Next players will select which goods they wish to transport into town and place them secretly in a small bag to conceal them. Once this is done, the player must declare what goods they are transporting. They may lie about the type of good, but they must be truthful about the number of cards. Players may only declare one type of good, and it must be a legal good. There are four types of legal goods: Apples, Cheese, Bread, and Chickens. All other goods are considered contraband. The bags are then handed to the Sheriff. A player may also include coins, promises of actions or cards as an incentive for the Sheriff not to inspect their goods. The Sheriff only gets to keep this bribe if they decide to let the player pass without inspection. Promises must be kept unless the promise is for a card that is not really in the bag, or for future actions. If the Sheriff inspects the goods and finds that the player was telling the truth and was not transporting any contraband goods, the Sheriff must pay the player gold equal to the total number displayed in the bottom right corner of the card. If the player was lying, they forfeit any contraband or undeclared goods AND they must pay the Sheriff gold equal to the total number displayed in the bottom right corner of the card.

The game ends after each player has been sheriff an equal number of times. Scores are tallied based on the numbers in the top right of the card. Contraband cards are generally worth more coins than legal cards. You also get 1 point for each gold remaining. Each legal type of good gives points to the "King" and "Queen"- the person with the most and second most number of that type of card.

== Expansions and editions ==
There have been multiple promo packs and cards released over the years, but the only significant expansion was called Merry Men which was released in 2017. This expansion added two deputies that could be used instead of one sheriff, a host of characters from the familiar Robin Hood story, a black market, laws, and Special Orders.

The second edition of Sheriff of Nottingham was released in June 2020.

== Reception ==
A board game review in The Wirecutter stated that Sheriff of Nottingham is "a lot of fun once you get the hang of it", but requires some time to master.

== Awards ==
Year	Ceremony	Award	Result
2014	Board Game Quest Awards	Best Thematic Game	Nominated
2014	Board Game Quest Awards	Best Card Game	Nominated
2014	Golden Geek	Best Card Game	Nominated
2014	Golden Geek	Best Family Board Game	Nominated
2014	Golden Geek	Best Family Board Game	Nominated
2014	Golden Geek	Best Party Board Game	Nominated
2014	Golden Geek	Game of the Year	Nominated
2015	SXSW Gaming Awards	Tabletop Game of the Year	Nominated
2015	Boardgames Australia Awards	Best International Game	Won
2015	Origins Award	Best Board Game	Won

== Publication and distribution ==
In 2016, CMON acquired the rights although Arcane Wonders still publishes the English editions of the game.
