= 2014 Origins Award winners =

The following are the winners of the 41st annual (2014) Origins Award, presented at Origins 2015:

Category	Winner	Company	Designer(s)
Best Board Game	Sheriff of Nottingham	Arcane Wonders	Sergio Halaban, Bryan Pope, Andre Zatz
Best Card Game	Splendor	Asmodee	Marc Andre
Best Children's, Family, & Party Game	The Hare and the Tortoise	Iello	Gary Kim
Best Collectible Card Game	Magic: the Gathering Khans of Tarkir	Wizards of the Coast	Wizards of the Coast R&D
Best Game Accessory	Wings of Glory Mat	Ares Games	Ares Games
Best Historical Board Game	Heroes of Normandie	Iello	Yann and Clem
Best Historical Miniature Figure/Line	Sails of Glory Series 2	Ares Games	Andrea Angiolino, Andrea Mainini
Best Historical Miniature Rules	Sails of Glory	Ares Games	Andrea Angiolino, Andrea Mainini
Best Historical Miniature Rules Supplements	Battleground Europe	Osprey Publishing/Warlord	Ryan Miller, Rick Priestley and Alessio Cavatore
Best Miniature Figure Rules	Golem Arcana	Harebrained Schemes	Jordan Weisman, Mike Mulvihill, Brian Poel
Best Role Playing Game	Dungeons & Dragons Players Handbook	Wizards of the Coast	Wizards of the Coast R&D
Best Role Playing Supplement	Dungeons & Dragons Monster Manual	Wizards of the Coast	Wizards of the Coast R&D

== Fan Favorites ==
Category	Winner	Company	Designer(s)
Fan Favorites—Best Board Game	Dead of Winter	Plaid Hat Games	Jonathon Gilmour
Fan Favorites—Best Card Game	Star Realms	White Wizard Games	Robert Dougherty, Darwin Kastle
Fan Favorites—Best Children's, Family, & Party Game	Gravwell: Escape from the 9th Dimension	Renegade Game Studios	Corey Young
Fan Favorites—Best Collectible Card Game	The Spoils	The Spoils USA	Ken Pilcher, Josh Lytle
Fan Favorites—Best Game Accessory	Counter Ring	Crit Success	Aaron Laniewicz
Fan Favorites—Best Historical Board Game	Heroes of Normandie	Iello	Yann and Clem
Fan Favorites—Best Historical Miniature Figure/Line	Sails of Glory Series 2	Ares Games	Andrea Angiolino, Andrea Mainini
Fan Favorites—Best Historical Miniature Rules	Sails of Glory	Ares Games	Andrea Angiolino, Andrea Mainini
Fan Favorites—Best Historical Miniature Rules Supplements	Flames of War: Barbarossa	Battlefront Miniatures	Battlefront Miniatures
Fan Favorites—Best Miniature Figure Rules	Marvel HeroClix: Guardians of the Galaxy Starter Set	WizKids Games	WizKids Games
Fan Favorites—Best Role Playing Game	Dungeons & Dragons Players Handbook	Wizards of the Coast	Wizards of the Coast R&D
Fan Favorites—Best Role Playing Supplement	Dungeons & Dragons Monster Manual	Wizards of the Coast	Wizards of the Coast R&D

== Vanguard Award Winners ==
Category	Winner	Company	Designer(s)
Vanguard Award	Marvel Dice Masters	WizKids Games	Mike Elliott & Eric Lang
Vanguard Award	Pathfinder Adventure Card Game	Paizo Publishing	Mike Selinker
