= Deck-building game =

Card game where each player creates a deck for their use

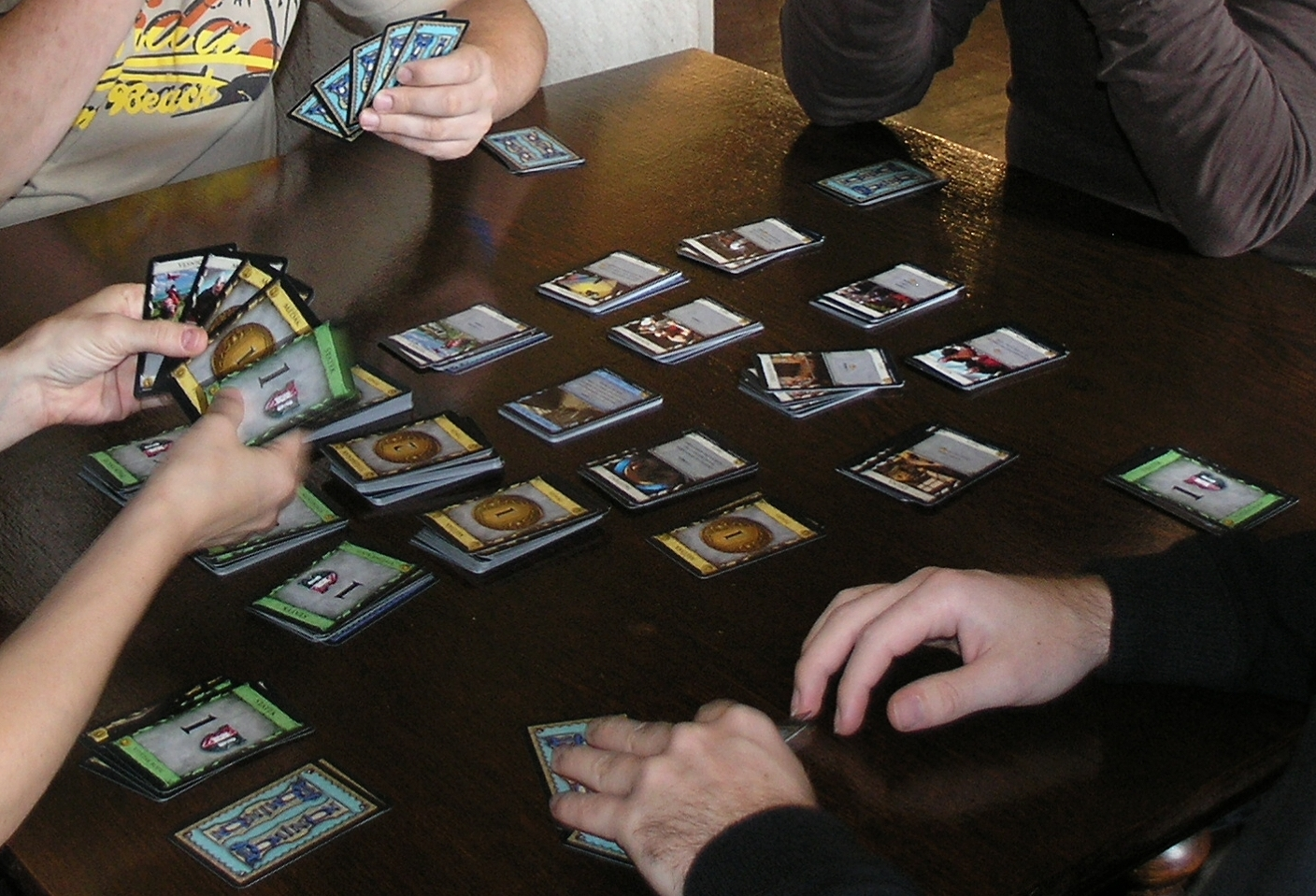
A game of Dominion; during the game players buy cards from stacks in the center of the table, to add to their deck

A deck-building game is a card game or board game where construction of a deck of cards is a main element of gameplay. Deck-building games are similar to collectible card games (CCGs) in that each player has their own deck. However, unlike CCGs, the cards are not sold in randomized packs, and the majority of the deck is built during the game, instead of before the game.

== Mechanics ==
In most deck-building games, each player starts with a small deck of cards of low value. Each turn, they draw some cards from their deck and play them, which may have various gameplay effects, and may buy more cards from a central market, thereby building their deck. The effects of playing cards often include providing the in-game currency that allows players to buy cards; other effects may include increasing the number of game actions a player may take on their turn, removing unwanted cards from the player’s deck, or attacking other players. As players buy more cards with more valuable abilities, their decks gradually become more powerful. When the player runs out of cards to draw, they shuffle their discard pile (which usually includes newly-gained cards) to create a new deck to draw from. Apart from this, however, games may vary; for instance, some are competitive, while others are co-operative.

As players do not build their decks before playing, they cannot organize a deck in advance, and must do so during play. Therefore, strategy is driven by the cards available in the market, which may vary from game to game. In some games (such as Legendary: A Marvel Deck Building Game), before the game begins, players can strategize and choose which cards go into the central market deck (the cards that can potentially be bought to increase the strength of each player’s deck).

Deck-building is the central mechanic in some games, such as Dominion or Star Realms. However, in others, such as the Mage Knight Board Game or Arkham Horror: The Card Game, it is combined with others.

If a game has similar mechanics, but does not use cards, it is frequently called a pool-building game.

== History ==
While StarCraft: The Board Game (published in 2007) was the first deck-building game, Dominion was the first popular deck-building game that set the standard for the genre. Its popularity spurred the creation of many others, including Thunderstone, Ascension: Chronicle of the Godslayer, Legendary (based on Marvel superhero comics) published by Upper Deck, and Clank! published by Renegade. In many cases, computerized versions of deck-building games are available, usually mimicking the tabletop version. For example, Dominion and Star Realms can be played online.

== List of deck-building games ==
- Aeon's End (Action Phase Games, Indie Boards & Cards, 2017)
- Arctic Scavengers (Rio Grande Games, 2009)
- Arcmage: Rebirth (Arcmage Creative Commons Games, 2018)
- Arcmage: Enchanted Realm (Arcmage Creative Commons Games, 2019)
- Arcmage: New Horizons (Arcmage Creative Commons Games, 2020)
- Arcmage: Shadow Waves (Arcmage Creative Commons Games, 2021)
- Arcmage: Changing Winds (Arcmage Creative Commons Games, 2021)
- Ascension: Chronicle of the Godslayer (Stone Blade, 2010)
- Asgard's Chosen (Mayfair Games, 2013)
- Attack on Titan (Cryptozoic, 2016)
- Capcom Street Fighter Deck-building Game (Cryptozoic, 2014)
- Cartoon Network Crossover Crisis (Cryptozoic, 2016)
- Clank! (Renegade Game Studios, 2016)
- Clank! In! Space! (Renegade Game Studios, 2017)
- DC Comics Deck-building Game (Cryptozoic, 2012)
- DC Comics Deck-Building Game: Heroes Unite (Cryptozoic, 2013)
- DC Deck-building Game: Confrontations (Cryptozoic, 2017)
- DC Deck-building Game: Dark Nights - Metal (Cryptozoic, 2020)
- Dominion (Rio Grande Games, 2008)
- Dune: Imperium (Dire Wolf Games, 2020)
- Eschaton (Archon Games, 2016)
- Forever Evil (Cryptozoic, 2014)
- G.I. JOE: Deck-Building Game (Renegade Game Studios, 2021)
- Great Western Trail (eggertspiele, 2016)
- Harry Potter™ Hogwarts™ Battle: A Cooperative Deck-Building Game (USAopoly, 2015)
- Hero Realms (White Wizard, 2016)
- Justice Society of America (Cryptozoic)
- Legendary: A Marvel Deck Building Game (Upper Deck, 2012)
- Legendary Encounters: An Alien Deck Building Game (Upper Deck, 2014)
- Legendary: A James Bond Deck Building Game (Upper Deck, 2019)
- Library of Ruina (Project Moon, 2021)
- Lost Ruins of Arnak (Czech Games Edition, 2020)
- Millennium Blades (Level 99 Games, 2016)
- Mistborn: The Deckbuilding Game (Brotherwise Games, 2024)
- Multiverse (Cryptozoic, 2017)
- Mystic Vale (Alderac, 2016)
- My Little Pony: Adventures in Equestria Deck-Building Game (Renegade Game Studios, 2022)
- Paperback Adventures (Fowers Games, 2022)
- Power Rangers: Deck-Building Game (Renegade Game Studios, 2021)
- Rick and Morty: Close Rick (Cryptozoic, 2017)
- Rick and Morty: The Rickshank Rickdemption (Cryptozoic, 2018)
- Rivals – Batman vs The Joker (Cryptozoic, 2014)
- Rivals – Green Lantern vs Sinestro (Cryptozoic, 2018)
- The Quest for El Dorado (Ravensburger, 2017)
- Shadowrun: Crossfire (Catalyst Game Lab, 2014)
- Shards of Infinity (Stone Blade, 2018)
- Slay the Spire: The Board Game (Contention Games, 2024)
- StarCraft: The Board Game (Fantasy Flight Games, 2007)
- Star Realms (White Wizard, 2014)
- Star Wars: The Deckbuilding Game (Fantasy Flight Games, 2023)
- Teen Titans (Cryptozoic, 2015)
- Teen Titans Go! (Cryptozoic, 2017)
- The Lord of the Rings: The Fellowship of the Ring Deck-Building Game (Cryptozoic, 2013)
- The Lord of the Rings: The Two Towers Deck-Building Game (Cryptozoic, 2013)
- The Lord of the Rings: The Return of the King Deck-Building Game (Cryptozoic, 2014)
- Thunderstone (Alderac, 2009)
- Trains (OKAZU Brand, Alderac, 2012)
- Transformers: Deck-Building Game (Renegade Game Studios, 2021)
- Viscounts of the West Kingdom (Garphill Games, 2020)
- Warring Kingdom (2014)

== Deck-building in video games ==
Deck-building elements can be used as part of larger video games, such as Kingdom Hearts: Chain of Memories and Metal Gear Acid which integrate deck-based combat systems into established game series.

Roguelike deck-building games are games that combine deck-building with procedurally generated scenarios and rewards, a fundamental principle of roguelike games. These games require the player to build their deck as they play, usually having to add cards from a random selection as a reward for completing objectives. While the first known example of such a game was Dream Quest in 2014, the genre gained momentum with the release of Slay the Spire in 2017.

== See also ==
- Dedicated deck card game
