= Arkham Horror: The Card Game =

2016 American deck-building card game

- Designers: Nate French and MJ Newman; Duke Harrist, Nicholas Kory, Waleed Ma'arouf
- Publishers: Fantasy Flight Games
- Publication: 15 November 2016
- Years active: 2016 – present
- Genres: Co-operative living card game (LCG) with deck building
- Languages: English, German, French, Portuguese, Spanish, Italian, Greek, Polish, Czech, Russian, Ukrainian
- Players: 1 – 4
- Setup time: 10 – 15 minutes (excluding deck building)
- Playing time: 60 – 120 minutes
- Chance: Some (card drawing, deck building, skill tests)
- Skills: Card playing, deck building, logic, strategy
- Materials required: All included, expansions optional but all require base game.
- Media type: Playing cards
- Website: Arkham Horror: The Card Game — Fantasy Flight Games

Arkham Horror: The Card Game is a cooperative living card game produced by Fantasy Flight Games since 2016. It is set in the universe of Chaosium's Call of Cthulhu role-playing game which is itself based on the Cthulhu Mythos of H. P. Lovecraft and other cosmic horror writers. The title refers to Lovecraft's fictional town of Arkham, Massachusetts which is mentioned in many Mythos stories.

== Release ==
News of the game was originally leaked in May 2016, before being officially announced in August of that same year. It made its first limited public release at Arkham Nights 2016 to a sold-out crowd.

In its original release format, as a game in Fantasy Flight Games' Living Card Game line, there was a regular release of non-random deluxe expansions that start a story or campaign with two playable scenarios, followed by multiple smaller expansions (known as mythos packs) that continue and conclude each campaign story with six additional playable scenarios.

With the announcement of Edge of the Earth in 2021, Fantasy Flight stated future cycles would simply be released in two larger boxes, one containing all of the campaign's scenarios and the other the campaign's player cards. During a Gen Con livestream in September 2021, Fantasy Flight head of studio Chris Gerber announced all previous expansions would be re-released in the new format, too.

Periodically, Fantasy Flight Games has also released "Standalone Adventures" that are unique playable experiences that do not connect to any other campaigns.

As of the release of The Scarlet Keys in 2022, the lead designer MJ Newman has stepped back from her role as the lead developer of the game to become a senior designer at FFG. Designer Josiah "Duke" Harrist was announced as lead designer with Nick Kory, previously of the MythosBusters Podcast, also joining the design team.

== Mechanics ==
Campaign play is the default mode of the game, allowing a player to progress through a series of scenarios. In campaign play, choices made in scenarios have lasting effects, altering the story and how later scenarios play out. Each scenario has multiple paths of divergence offering multiple playthroughs with differing experiences each time.

When players prepare to play, they first choose an investigator, most of them having a primary class of Guardian, Survivor, Rogue, Seeker, or Mystic. Each investigator deck receives cards that represent weaknesses of their investigator, one specific to each investigator, and one "basic" - drawn at random from a general pool. Investigators will also possess one or more unique cards that represent that individual's specific advantages or abilities, often complementing the backstory of that investigator. Each investigator also has different starting statistics (Willpower, Intellect, Combat, and Agility) which will be tested throughout the game. Players then build their decks from cards in their collection, conforming to the deck-building limits outlined by their investigator.

During the game, the investigators work together to progress their investigation towards a positive outcome by fulfilling the requirements set out by the Act deck. However, there are forces working against the investigators, represented by the Agenda deck and encounter deck. Each turn, a doom counter is added to the Agenda deck, acting as a timer for the investigators to complete their objectives. When the total number of doom in play reaches the doom threshold of the agenda card, the agenda will advance, often to negative consequences.

During the Investigation phase, the investigators each take up to three actions. Among other options, actions include playing cards from hand or activating those already in play, moving to or investigating locations and fighting or evading enemies. Depending on the card, cards played from hand during the investigation phase may enter an investigator's play area as an ongoing bonus (an "asset") or simply provide a powerful one-time effect and be discarded upon use (an "event"). Many cards have a resource cost which must be paid to play the card. While cards generally require an action to play, some are "fast" and do not require an action to be played.

The Investigation phase is followed by the Enemy, Upkeep, and the Mythos phases, representing the forces working against the investigators each round. Investigators may have to deal with effects or enemies that attack their sanity, health or simply their progression towards their main goal (the Act deck).

Investigators will be eliminated from a scenario if they receive horror or damage equal to their sanity or health respectively. Investigators eliminated in this way will receive permanent mental or physical trauma. This means investigators repeatedly defeated in scenarios can become progressively weaker as the campaign progresses. Investigators will, however, receive experience from scenarios (even after defeat), which can be spent to improve each investigator's deck. At certain points in a campaign, failure may lead to investigators being killed or driven insane, eliminating them from the campaign. Players may choose to replace an eliminated investigator with a new one, however the replacement investigator begins with no experience.

== Expansions ==
The main story expansions are grouped into "cycles" that each constitute a complete player campaign. The first six cycles (The Dunwich Legacy to The Innsmouth Conspiracy) consist of one Deluxe Expansion followed by six mythos packs. Deluxe expansions contain new investigators, about 60 new player cards and the first two scenarios of a campaign, while mythos packs contain about 24 new player cards and a single scenario of a campaign. These are listed below in order of release date, which is also the order in which they are meant to be played. Later cycles, starting with Edge of the Earth, have abandoned the deluxe/mythos format and are instead split into two releases, an "investigator expansion" (featuring all of the new player cards) and a "campaign expansion" (featuring all scenarios of the campaign). This new format release has since been retroactively adopted for the previous cycles. New players seeking all cards in a particular campaign now need only purchase the two new-format boxes ("investigator expansion" and "campaign expansion"), these two boxes between them collect every card contained in the prior release format ("deluxe expansion" and six "mythos packs").

Standalone scenarios are scenarios that exist outside of a campaign/cycle and are self-contained. As such, a player does not need any other expansions to play them or encounter cards from the core box—only the player cards. Stand-alone scenarios are at times printed in house at Fantasy Flight Games and are referred to as Print on Demand (POD). This means the card quality in that case is lower than the packs shipped from overseas but Fantasy Flight Games can push these packs faster out to players at conventions or (in the case of Curse of the Rougarou and Carnevale of Horrors) for general release.

Upgrade expansions (the "return to" boxes) are akin to the "nightmare packs" from the Lord of the Rings LCG. However, instead of just increasing the difficulty, these expansions provide an alternate way to play through the campaign with alternate story effects. They also include a small selection of new player cards (e.g. the first box includes 20 player cards).

=== Introduction of "Environment" concept ===
On 7 February 2025, Fantasy Flight Games announced the introduction of an "Environment" concept into all of their cooperative LCGs, including Arkham Horror. There are two environments for Arkham Horror: The Current Environment and the Legacy Environment.

The Current Environment consists of "core set, any other evergreen (perpetually in print) expansions, as well as the newer expansions that have not yet been retired." The Legacy Environment consists of "any product that has ever been printed for the game." Thus, newer products will exist in both environments while retired products will only exist in the Legacy environment.

On 11 July 2025, Fantasy Flight Games announced the beta version of the new "Environment" concept which clarified that the three most recent expansions would be used for the Current format and included a new the Limited environment where player could include "any [t]hree different investigator expansions of your choice". Fantasy Flight Games also indicated that along with the original or revised core set, the starter decks released as of 2025 would be part of all formats.

=== Cycles ===
==== The Dunwich Legacy ====
Expansion Name	Release date	Type	Environment
The Dunwich Legacy	12 January 2017	Deluxe Expansion	Both
The Miskatonic Museum	16 February 2017	Mythos Pack	Both
The Essex County Express	16 March 2017	Mythos Pack	Both
Blood on the Altar	13 April 2017	Mythos Pack	Both
Undimensioned and Unseen	11 May 2017	Mythos Pack	Both
Where Doom Awaits	8 June 2017	Mythos Pack	Both
Lost in Time and Space	6 July 2017	Mythos Pack	Both
The Dunwich Legacy Investigator Expansion	25 February 2022	Investigator Expansion	Legacy
The Dunwich Legacy Campaign Expansion	18 March 2022	Campaign Expansion	Both

==== The Path to Carcosa ====
Expansion Name	Release date	Type	Environment
The Path to Carcosa	14 September 2017	Deluxe Expansion	Both
Echoes of the Past	26 October 2017	Mythos Pack	Both
The Unspeakable Oath	24 November 2017	Mythos Pack	Both
A Phantom of Truth	21 December 2017	Mythos Pack	Both
The Pallid Mask	25 January 2018	Mythos Pack	Both
Black Stars Rise	22 February 2018	Mythos Pack	Both
Dim Carcosa	22 March 2018	Mythos Pack	Both
The Path to Carcosa Investigator Expansion	27 May 2022	Investigator Expansion	Legacy
The Path to Carcosa Campaign Expansion	1 July 2022	Campaign Expansion	Both

==== The Forgotten Age ====
Expansion Name	Release date	Type	Environment
The Forgotten Age	10 May 2018	Deluxe Expansion	Both
Threads of Fate	14 June 2018	Mythos Pack	Both
The Boundary Beyond	19 July 2018	Mythos Pack	Both
Heart of the Elders	16 August 2018	Mythos Pack	Both
The City of Archives	13 September 2018	Mythos Pack	Both
The Depths of Yoth	11 October 2018	Mythos Pack	Both
Shattered Aeons	15 November 2018	Mythos Pack	Both
The Forgotten Age Investigator Expansion	17 February 2023	Investigator Expansion	Legacy
The Forgotten Age Campaign Expansion	17 March 2023	Campaign Expansion	Both

==== The Circle Undone ====
Expansion Name	Release date	Type	Environment
The Circle Undone	31 January 2019	Deluxe Expansion	Both
The Secret Name	14 March 2019	Mythos Pack	Both
The Wages of Sin	4 April 2019	Mythos Pack	Both
For the Greater Good	2 May 2019	Mythos Pack	Both
Union and Disillusion	6 June 2019	Mythos Pack	Both
In the Clutches of Chaos	5 July 2019	Mythos Pack	Both
Before the Black Throne	26 July 2019	Mythos Pack	Both
The Circle Undone Investigator Expansion	9 June 2023	Investigator Expansion	Legacy
The Circle Undone Campaign Expansion	14 July 2023	Campaign Expansion	Both

==== The Dream-Eaters ====
Expansion Name	Release date	Type	Environment
The Dream-Eaters	27 September 2019	Deluxe Expansion	Both
The Search for Kadath	15 November 2019	Mythos Pack	Both
A Thousand Shapes of Horror	13 December 2019	Mythos Pack	Both
Dark Side of the Moon	10 January 2020	Mythos Pack	Both
Point of No Return	7 February 2020	Mythos Pack	Both
Where the Gods Dwell	6 March 2020	Mythos Pack	Both
Weaver of the Cosmos	5 June 2020	Mythos Pack	Both
The Dream-Eaters Investigator Expansion	10 May 2024	Investigator Expansion	Legacy
The Dream-Eaters Campaign Expansion	5 July 2024	Campaign Expansion	Both

==== The Innsmouth Conspiracy ====
Expansion Name	Release date	Type	Environment
The Innsmouth Conspiracy	2 October 2020	Deluxe Expansion	Both
In Too Deep	6 November 2020	Mythos Pack	Both
Devil Reef	4 December 2020	Mythos Pack	Both
Horror in High Gear	22 January 2021	Mythos Pack	Both
A Light in the Fog	19 February 2021	Mythos Pack	Both
The Lair of Dagon	19 March 2021	Mythos Pack	Both
Into the Maelstrom	21 May 2021	Mythos Pack	Both
The Innsmouth Conspiracy Investigator Expansion	13 September 2024	Investigator Expansion	Legacy
The Innsmouth Conspiracy Campaign Expansion	11 October 2024	Campaign Expansion	Both

==== Edge of the Earth ====
Expansion Name	Release date	Type	Environment
Edge of the Earth Investigator Expansion	19 November 2021	Investigator Expansion	Legacy
Edge of the Earth Campaign Expansion	3 December 2021	Campaign Expansion	Both

==== The Scarlet Keys ====
Expansion Name	Release date	Type	Environment
The Scarlet Keys Investigator Expansion	30 September 2022	Investigator Expansion	Both
The Scarlet Keys Campaign Expansion	18 November 2022	Campaign Expansion	Both

==== The Feast of Hemlock Vale ====
Expansion Name	Release date	Type	Environment
The Feast of Hemlock Vale Investigator Expansion	16 February 2024	Investigator Expansion	Both
The Feast of Hemlock Vale Campaign Expansion	23 February 2024	Campaign Expansion	Both

==== The Drowned City ====
Expansion Name	Release date	Type	Environment
The Drowned City Investigator Expansion	7 March 2025	Investigator Expansion	Both
The Drowned City Campaign Expansion	4 April 2025	Campaign Expansion	Both

=== Standalone scenarios ===
Expansion Name	Release date	Environment
Curse of the Rougarou	17 November 2016	Both
Carnevale of Horrors	8 December 2016	Both
The Labyrinths of Lunacy	7 June 2018	Both
The Eternal Slumber	6 December 2018	Both
The Night's Usurper	6 December 2018	Both
Guardians of the Abyss	6 December 2018	Both
The Blob that Ate Everything	3 July 2020	Both
Murder at the Excelsior Hotel	25 October 2019	Both
Barkham Horror: The Meddling of Meowlathotep	18 September 2020	Both
War of the Outer Gods	4 December 2020	Both
Machinations Through Time	4 February 2022	Both
Fortune And Folly	14 April 2023	Both
The Midwinter Gala	23 August 2024	Both
Film Fatale	15 August 2025	Both

=== Upgrade expansions ===
Expansion Name	Release date	Environment
Return to the Night of the Zealot	28 June 2018	Both
Return to the Dunwich Legacy	10 January 2019	Both
Return to the Path to Carcosa	6 September 2019	Both
Return to the Forgotten Age	7 August 2020	Both
Return to the Circle Undone	27 August 2021	Both

=== Investigator starter decks ===
Expansion Name	Release date	Environment
Harvey Walters	28 August 2020	Both
Winifred Habbamock	28 August 2020	Both
Jacqueline Fine	28 August 2020	Both
Stella Clark	28 August 2020	Both
Nathaniel Cho	28 August 2020	Both
Tommy Muldoon	17 April 2026	Both
Carolyn Fern	17 April 2026	Both
André Patel	17 April 2026	Both
Marie Lambeau	17 April 2026	Both
Miguel de la Cruz	17 April 2026	Both

== Novellas ==
Asmodee's publishing house Aconyte Books released several tie-in novellas for Arkham Horror: The Card Game, each focused around a specific investigator. Each novella comes with 5 promo cards: 1 alternate art investigator card, 1 alternate art mini investigator card, 1 replacement signature card, 1 replacement signature weakness, and 1 rules card for using the replacement cards in the game.

Expansion Name	Release date	Investigator focus	Author
Hour of the Huntress	13 October 2017	Jenny Barnes	Dave Gross
Ire of the Void	7 December 2017	Norman Withers	Richard Lee Byers
The Dirge of Reason	22 February 2018	Roland Banks	Graeme Davis
To Fight the Black Wind	5 April 2018	Carolyn Fern	Jennifer Brozek
The Deep Gate	7 June 2018	Silas Marsh	Chris A. Jackson
The Blood of Baalshandor	5 June 2020	Dexter Drake	Richard Lee Byers
Dark Revelations	6 November 2020	Gloria Goldberg	Amanda Downum
