= Ascension: Deckbuilding Game =

2010 deck-building card game and 2011 video game

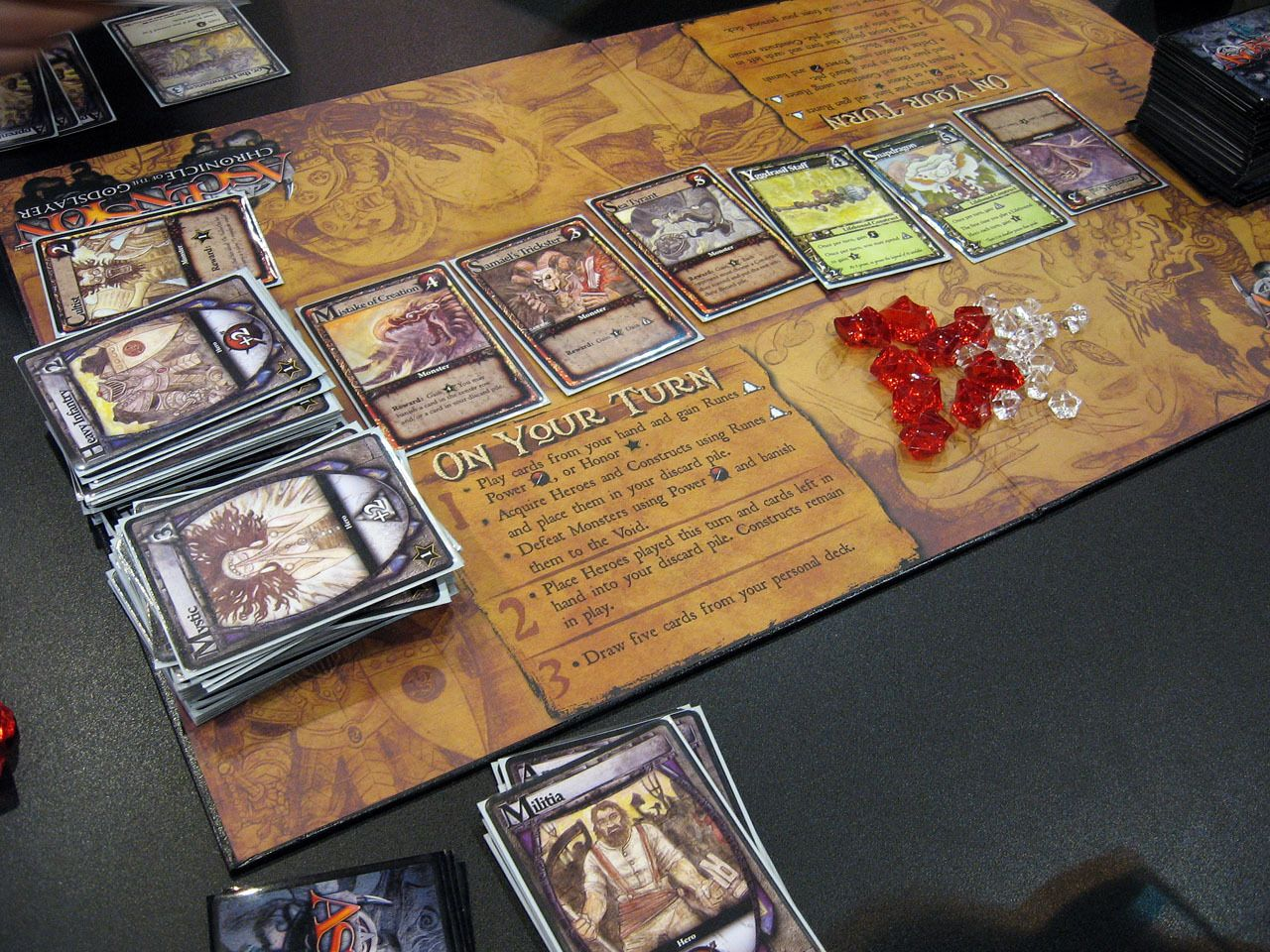
- Demo of Ascension at Spiel 2010
- Developer(s): Playdek
- Publisher(s): Playdek
- Platform(s): iOS, Android
- Release: iOS; June 30, 2011; Android; August 14, 2014
- Mode(s): Single-player, 2-4 Players, 2-6 Players with Expansions

Ascension: Deckbuilding Game (formerly Ascension: Chronicle of the Godslayer) is a 2010 deck-building card game created by American studio Stone Blade Entertainment (originally known as Gary Games), headed by professional Magic: The Gathering player Justin Gary. The main designers of the game are Justin Gary, Brian Kibler, Rob Dougherty and John Fiorillo. The game is available both in physical and digital formats; the iOS version, developed by Playdek, was released on June 30, 2011, and was later released for Windows on December 16, 2014. Ascension Tactics, a spin-off with similar mechanics, was funded on Kickstarter in August 2020.

== Expansions ==
Ascension has received various major expansions since its release. Note that these years are for the release of physical copies; currently, as of 2024 the digital game lacks the Skulls and Sails and Curse of the Golden Isles expansions.

- Return of the Fallen (2011)
- Storm of Souls (2011)
- Immortal Heroes (2012)
- Rise of Vigil (2013)
- Darkness Unleashed (2013)
- Realms Unraveled (2014)
- Dawn of Champions (2015)
- Dreamscape (2015)
- War of Shadows (2016)
- Gift of the Elements (2017)
- Valley of the Ancients (2017)
- Delirium (2018)
- Deliverance (2018)
- Skulls and Sails (2019)
- Curse of the Golden Isles (2021)

== Reception ==
In a review of Ascension: Chronicle of the Godslayer in Black Gate, Bradley Beaulieu said "this is a great, easy to learn, fast-moving game with lots of replay potential. As you learn the game and the cards, you'll start to find more synchronicity between the various cards and factions, so your appreciation (not to mention your ability to win) grows the more you play."

== Video game ==
The video game version of Ascension features the option to battle against AI and online players, and received various expansion packs via DLC. It received largely positive reviews from critics, who praised the gameplay, but criticized the lack of a single-player campaign or story mode, and the fact that the PC version was largely unchanged from the mobile version rather than accounting for the change in platform.

=== Reception ===
The mobile version of Ascension received an aggregate score of 84/100 on Metacritic. Jonathan H. Liu of Wired stated that the development team did "a good job translating the game from cards to an app", but also said that "some of my original reservations about the game still held true in either format".
