= Rob Dougherty =

American Magic: The Gathering player

Robert R. Dougherty
- Born: August 9, 1969 (age 57)
- Nationality: (United States) American
- Pro Tour debut: 1996 Pro Tour New York
- Winnings: US$146,252
- Pro Tour wins (Top 8): 1 (5)
- Grand Prix wins (Top 8): 1 (6)
- Median Pro Tour Finish: 131
- Lifetime Pro Points: 309
- Planeswalker Level: 48 (Archmage)

Robert R. Dougherty (born August 9, 1969) is a professional Magic: The Gathering player from Framingham, Massachusetts. He was inducted into the Magic Hall of Fame in November 2006. He is also a tournament organizer and the founder of Your Move Games. Your Move Games is a team as well as the name of a chain of game stores owned by Dougherty.

Dougherty is also a game designer and the CEO of Wise Wizard Games. Their deck building game Star Realms has won numerous awards, including the 2015 SXSW Tabletop Game of the Year Award, four Golden Geek Awards for Best 2-Player Game, Best Card Game, Best Indie Game and Best Handheld Game, two Dice Tower Awards for Best Two-Player Game and Best Small Publisher, and Best Card Game: Fan Favorite at Origins 2015. He has designed Epic Card Game, the EpicTCG and Battleground Fantasy Warfare. He has also worked on Hero Realms, Ascension: Chronicle of the Godslayer, Solforge, and the VS Trading Card Game.

== Accomplishments ==
Season	Event type	Location	Format	Date	Rank
1998–99	Pro Tour	New York	Block Constructed	30 April–2 May 1999	5
1999–00	Pro Tour	Washington D.C.	Team Limited	3–5 September 1999	1
1999–00	Grand Prix	St. Louis	Team Limited	13–14 May 2000	3
1999–00	Grand Prix	Pittsburgh	Team Limited	24–25 June 2000	4
2000–01	Pro Tour	Chicago	Standard	1–3 December 2000	4
2000–01	Grand Prix	Columbus, Ohio	Team Limited	27–28 January 2001	1
2000–01	Masters	Tokyo	Team Limited	15–18 March 2001	5
2001–02	Grand Prix	Las Vegas, Nevada	Extended	8–9 December 2001	6
2001–02	Masters	San Diego	Standard	10–13 January 2002	5
2001–02	Masters	Osaka	Team Limited	14–17 March 2002	6
2001–02	Pro Tour	Osaka	Block Constructed	15–17 March 2002	3
2002–03	Grand Prix	Cleveland	Block Constructed	7–8 August 2002	8
2002–03	Pro Tour	Houston	Extended	8–10 November 2002	2
2003–04	Grand Prix	Washington D.C.	Team Limited	17–18 April 2004	3

Last updated: 20 April 2009
Source: Wizards.com

Other accomplishments:

- Magic Hall of Fame class of 2006
- Top 4 at Pro Circuit-Indianapolis (2005) (VS System)
