= Epic Card Game =

Strategy card game

- Card back of Epic Card Game
- Designer: Robert Dougherty
- Publisher: Wise Wizard Games
- Playing time: 20 minutes
- Website: epiccardgame.com

Epic Card Game is a strategy card game created by Wise Wizard Games. It was released in 2015 after a successful Kickstarter crowdfunding campaign.

Epic can be played with two or more players who act as gods in conflict, playing champions who fight against the other players. Unlike collectible card games, each set of Epic contains every card. The game can be played as a drafting or sealed deck card game, and preconstructed decks can also be used to play.

In early 2017, another Kickstarter campaign was successfully funded for a digital video game version of Epic. As of February 2020, the app is available for free.

== Gameplay ==
Example of gameplay, from the digital app for the game.

Players begin with 30 health. If this health goes to zero, the player is eliminated. On each player's turn, each player has one "gold" point. Some cards cost one gold to play; others cost zero. At most one gold value card may be played by each player each turn. Cards played may be events or champions. Events have an immediate effect and are discarded after use; champions stay in play until either "broken" (sent to the discard pile), "banished" (placed on the bottom of that player's face-down deck), or "returned to its owner's hand". Players have many possible actions, depending on the combination of cards they play: do damage to the health of the other player(s) or their champion card(s) in play, break or banish a champion in play, create "token" champions, cause a player to draw more cards, or bring back cards from a discard pile.

The game continues until a player wins by either eliminating all their opponents or having no cards left when they need to draw.

== Expansions ==
Tyrants, the first expansion to Epic, was released in March 2016. Each of four packs includes 12 new cards. The second expansion, Epic Uprising, was released in December 2016. Epic Pantheon was released in 2018.

== Tournaments ==
The 2016 World Championship of Epic was held in November in Massachusetts. The top prize was $25,000, and a total of $100,000 prizes were awarded. The champion was John Tatian.

The 2017 World Championship of Epic was held in November in Massachusetts. The top prize was $15,000, and a total of $50,000 prizes were awarded. The champion was John Tatian again.

In 2019, Wise Wizard Games ran their first Epic 10K Championship at Origins Game Fair.
