= Wise Wizard Games =

Board and card game company

- Industry: Collectible card games
- Founded: 2013; 13 years ago
- Founder: Rob Dougherty
- Headquarters: Framingham, Massachusetts, USA
- Products: Epic Card Game, Star Realms, Hero Realms
- Website: wisewizardgames.com

Wise Wizard Games LLC (formerly White Wizard Games) is a games company founded in 2013. They are the creators of Star Realms, Epic Card Game, Hero Realms, and Sorcerer. The company CEO, Rob Dougherty, and Creative Director, Darwin Kastle, are both in the Magic The Gathering Hall of Fame.

== Awards and recognition ==
Wise Wizard Games has won more than seven game-of-the-year awards for their popular card-based deck building science-fiction tabletop game, Star Realms. This includes the 2014 Origins Award winners for Star Realms in the category Fan Favorites—Best Card Game, and the South by Southwest award for Tabletop Game of the Year in 2015.

Wise Wizard Games have received many positive reviews for Hero Realms (funded through a successful Kickstarter Campaign which raised over $555,000), Star Realms as well as for Epic Card Game (funded through a successful Kickstarter campaign which raised over $585,000).

== Name change ==
On March 15, 2021, White Wizard Games LLC, announced that the company name had been changed to Wise Wizard Games, stating a desire to have a name that best represents their vision and community. The company has plans to grow, including development of a new arena strategy game designed by Richard Garfield. Future reprints of games will use the updated company name.
