= Dominion (card game) =

Deck-building card game

- Box cover art
- Designers: Donald X. Vaccarino
- Publishers: Rio Grande Games
- Players: 2 to 4 (up to 6 with additional base cards)
- Setup time: 5–10 minutes
- Playing time: ~30 minutes
- Chance: Medium
- Skills: Resource management, Planning

Dominion is a card game created by Donald X. Vaccarino and published by Rio Grande Games. Originally published in 2008, it was the first deck-building game, and inspired a genre of games in that category. As of 3 October 2026, sixteen expansions to the game have been released.

In Dominion, each player takes turns drawing from their own personal deck of cards. Each player's deck starts identical, but players can purchase new cards from a common supply to upgrade their deck; these new cards can then be drawn and used on future turns. Players seek to build the strongest deck with the most victory points needed to win the game.

The game has a medieval theme with card names referencing pre-industrial, monarchical, and feudal social structures. It is possible to compare the game with collectible card games such as Magic: The Gathering.

When Dominion was released at the Spiel game fair in 2008, it was voted "best game of the fair" by the Fairplay polls. The next year it won the Spiel des Jahres and Deutscher Spiele Preis awards. It was one of five winning games in American Mensa's 2009 MindGame competition. By 2017, more than 2.5 million copies of Dominion and its expansions had been sold worldwide.

== Gameplay ==
=== Cards and setup ===
Two to four players compete to gather the most victory points by strategically building a deck of cards. Each player starts with a deck containing a few weak cards, using which they acquire more cards with different and more powerful abilities. Some cards provide in-game currency; others let the player perform more actions or buy more cards per turn; others let them draw more cards, attack the other players, or remove unwanted cards from their decks, among other functionality. As players improve their decks, they also think about how to improve their scores by scoring victory points.

Dominion has been compared to the "draft" gameplay style of collectible card games where players vie for the best deck from a common pool of cards.

Cards are classified into types, listed at the bottom of each card. The six types in the base set are:

- Victory cards have a victory point value at the end of the game but usually have no use while the game is in progress.
- Curse cards are like Victory cards but have a negative victory point value.
- Treasure cards generate coins which can be used to buy other cards during the Buy phase.
- Action cards have many kinds of effects, but by default only one may be played per turn.
- Attack cards hurt other players, such as by forcing them to discard cards from their hand or gain Curse cards.
- Reaction cards can be triggered out of turn in response to certain events, such as other players' Attacks.

Cards may have more than one type. For instance, an Action might also be an Attack. Certain cards are affected by other cards' types; for instance, some Reactions are triggered when another player uses an Attack card.

Cards are divided into two groups: base cards, which are present in every game, and kingdom cards, of which each game has a different assortment. The base cards consist of Curse cards, three kinds of Treasure, and three kinds of Victory cards. Kingdom cards are mostly actions, but some have other types, including Treasure and Victory. There is one pile of each card in the game; once the pile is empty, players can no longer buy that card. Together, these cards form the supply. A few cards from expansions change the rules in fundamental ways.

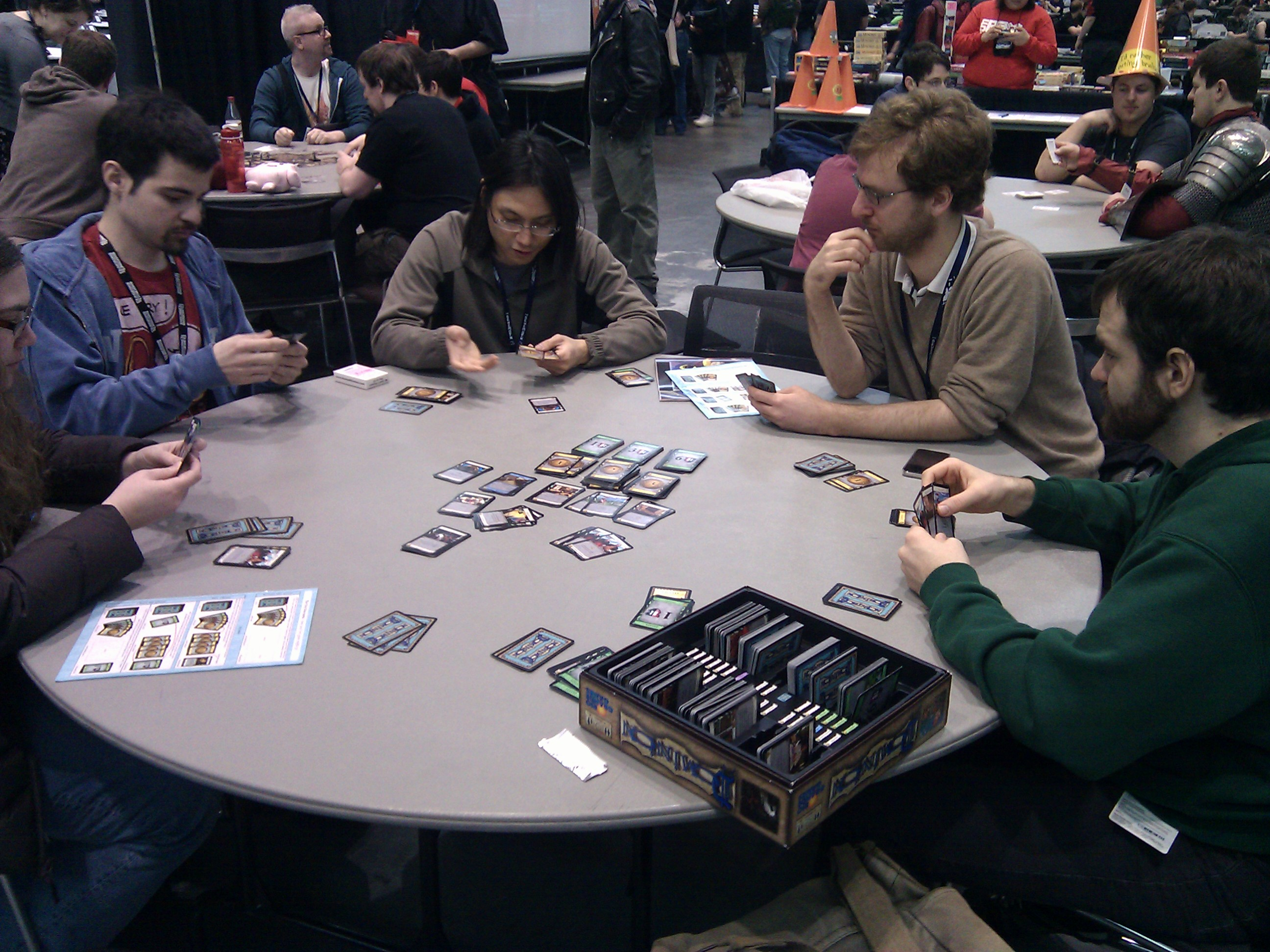
A game of Dominion in progress at the 2011 PAX East exposition

To begin a game, players decide on the kingdom cards to be used, by either selecting them or choosing randomly. Cards from different sets of Dominion can be mixed freely. Each player gets a starting deck of seven Copper cards, low-valued treasure, and three Estate cards, low-value victory points. Each player shuffles their deck and draws the top five cards to form their hand.

=== During play ===
Each turn, the player gains one action and one buy. The player performs the following phases in order (abbreviated as "ABC" as a mnemonic):

- Action phase: The player can play one Action card from their hand, following the card's printed instructions. By default only one Action card may be played, but some cards have instructions that give the player permission to play additional Action cards that same turn.
- Buy phase: The player can play any Treasure cards they want from their hand, generating coins. Then they may use the coins they have generated in their Action and Buy phases to purchase a card from the supply; if the player has no coins, they may still buy a card with a zero coin cost. By default only one card may be bought, but if a player has generated additional buys earlier in the turn, they may divide their coins among multiple purchases. Bought cards are added to the player's discard pile (and will later be shuffled into their deck).
- Clean-up phase: The player collects their hand and all played cards and places those into their discard pile. They then draw five new cards from their deck. Unused actions, buys, and coins do not carry over to future turns.

If the player must draw a card from an empty deck, they shuffle their discard pile to create a new deck. Some Action cards can trash cards, removing them from players' decks and into the Trash pile, where they are out of the game (though a few actions from expansions can recover them).

The game ends under one of two conditions: when the stack of Province cards (the highest-value Victory card) has been exhausted, or when any three stacks in the supply have been emptied. Players count the number of victory points in their decks, and the player with the highest score wins.

Since possessing Victory cards is often necessary to win the game, but they typically have no value during gameplay, players must balance the acquisition of Victory cards with Action and Treasure cards that maintain the player's ability to play effective turns. Usually, the game's main strategy is to build a deck that maximizes the player's ability to draw hands that can buy Provinces.

== Expansions ==
Several expansions to Dominion have been released. The basic set is simple, and each expansion adds more complexity, typically through the addition of new kingdom cards and additional rules, such as adding new card types or changing the composition of each players' starting deck.

Some expansions have added "landscapes" to the game setup. These are distinguished from cards by having landscape orientation rather than portrait, and do not enter the players' hand or deck, but are either resolved immediately or placed in the players' play areas. These have different effects on the game; for example, the Adventures expansion introduced the ability to buy Events, which provide immediate bonuses. Other expansions have introduced tokens for tracking game progression. The Prosperity expansion introduced victory point tokens, which can be earned by playing certain kingdom cards; these increase players' scores but do not dilute their decks with victory cards. If players use kingdom cards that require these non-supply card stacks or tokens, these are set up alongside the supply prior to play.

Many reviews recommend buying expansions to increase the variety of the game. Cards from different sets may be freely mixed with each other.

- Intrigue introduced cards with multiple uses, which the player must choose between when they play the card, and Victory cards which have another type and provide an ability or bonus. Intrigue has been recommended as the first expansion to purchase after the base set for play.
- Seaside' introduced Duration cards, which have effects that occur on the player's next turn. It also added tokens and mats which track their effects.
- Alchemy was the first set to introduce a new base card: Potion, a Treasure card which is needed to buy the expansion's kingdom cards.
- Prosperity's theme is wealth. It introduced two new base cards: a Victory card, Colony, that gives 10 victory points, and a Treasure card, Platinum, which gives 5 coins. It also introduced new Treasures and victory point tokens, which increase the players' score but are not part of their deck.
- Cornucopia has a theme of variety. Some of its cards reward players for having different cards in their deck. It includes a card which causes an extra kingdom pile to be added to the game. It also introduced cards from outside the supply that cannot be bought or gained normally, but have special methods which can be used to gain them.
- Hinterlands introduced cards which have special effects when gained or bought. It includes several cards which benefit other players when gained or used. Its second edition added a reaction sub-theme.
- Dark Ages has two themes: trashing cards, and upgrading them to better ones. It adds shelter cards that begin in each player's starting deck. Many features of the set's cards increase a player's deck size with cards that are not very useful. It introduced new ways to gain non-supply cards, ways to play cards from the supply without needing to buy them, cards which can replace players' starting Victory cards, and cards which have effects when they are trashed. Two piles contain copies of several differently-named cards.
- Guilds is themed around complex uses of money. It introduced coffers, which are tokens that save money for later. It introduced cards which players may 'overpay' for; the extra money spent provides immediate bonuses.
- Adventures introduced Travelers, and Reserve cards, a variant of Duration cards. Travelers are normal kingdom cards that are exchanged for a more powerful card until you reach the last upgrade. Like Durations, Reserve cards stay on the board when you play them; unlike Durations, they do not automatically return on the next turn. It also introduced Events, the first landscapes. It introduces new durations that have effects beyond your next turn, Hireling and Champion. It also adds bonus tokens that help or hurt a player later on.
- Empires introduced cards with a debt cost. When buying these cards, the player receives debt tokens, which they must later pay off. There are also split piles, in which a cheaper card sits on top, and once all copies of that have been purchased, a second card is available; most pairs have a synergistic relationship. Like Adventures, it includes Event cards. It also introduces Landmarks, landscapes which add more ways to gain or lose victory pointsm and gathering cards, which gather victory point tokens to be gained after some special effect.
- Nocturne introduced a new phase of the turn, Night. During the Night phase, which occurs after the Buy phase, players may play Night cards. The expansion also introduced Fate and Doom cards, which provide random bonuses and penalties from the Hex and Boon decks. There are also cards which play cards in the Trash pile; States, which have lingering effects on a player; and cards which replace players' starting Coppers with new Treasures called Heirlooms.
- Renaissance introduced Projects, Artifacts, and villager tokens, and features a trashing theme. Projects are landscapes which provide a permanent bonus if bought. Artifacts are persistent effects which are won by one player at a time, and are associated with a particular kingdom card. Villagers act as saved actions, spent on any later turn to allow them to play an additional action; they are similar to coffers, recurring in this set from Guilds.
- Menagerie introduced exile mats, Ways, additional Event cards, and cards which make use of the special Horse card. The exile mat temporarily removes cards from the player's deck or lets them acquire cards indirectly. Ways are landscapes; if a Way is in the game, a player playing an Action card may follow the Way's text rather than the printed text of the Action. Horse cards are in a special pile, cannot be purchased directly, and are returned to that pile when played.
- Allies introduced favor tokens. These are gained from Liaison cards and can provide benefits or be spent for various purposes using Allies, a new landscape. It also features split piles, returning from Empires, but with the variation that these piles may be rotated, allowing the other cards to be bought before exhausting the first type. These split piles have 4 copies of 4 different cards.
- Plunder introduced Loot and Traits. Loots are valuable Treasures that can only be gained via the effects of certain Action and Treasure cards. Traits are landscapes that modify all the cards in a particular pile. It also includes Treasures, Durations, and Events.
- Rising Sun introduces Shadow cards, which a player can play from their deck rather than their hand, and Prophecies, which are rule changes that will come into effect later in the game. It uses existing mechanics of Debt and Events. The expansion's theme is inspired by feudal Japan, with card names including Samurai and Ronin.
- In December 2025, the name and box art were revealed on Facebook for an upcoming expansion, Arcana.

== History ==
=== Initial development ===
Vaccarino was a software developer in the 1980s and 1990s. He created supplements for Dungeons & Dragons and created games based on existing board games. After the release of Magic: The Gathering in 1993, he began designing more seriously, created a 90-card fan expansion, Edge of the World, and became an informal contributor towards additional Magic works; for these contributions, he is credited in the official Magic rulebook. Vaccarino has said that Magic inspired him to design games. Later, he developed several game ideas and discussed them with Richard Garfield, the creator of Magic.

In 2006, Vaccarino invented the deck-building mechanic while working on a fantasy adventure card game called "Spirit Warriors II". Before showing the game to his gaming group, he struggled with the mechanics and spent a weekend stripping it down to its core elements. Specifically, encountering problems with introducing new cards over the course of the game, Vaccarino opted to simply have all cards available at the start. The game immediately became popular with his gaming group, overshadowing the usual staples, including Magic, for the next two years.

With this success, Vaccarino began looking to publish. During the 2007 Origins Game Fair, Vaccarino demonstrated the game with interest from Rio Grande Games. Shortly after he signed with Rio Grande, BoardGameGeek's columnists Valerie Putman and Dale Yu requested permission from Rio Grande to develop the game. During development, Dominion was called "Castle Builder", and then, later, "Game X". Yu suggested the final name of Dominion. Early on, Vaccarino had planned for the game to grow through expansions. However, he aimed to ensure that, if the game did take off, early expansions would not create incompatible sets of cards. In a post to BoardGameGeek, Vaccarino stated that he had originally planned seven expansions. He later brought cards into the base game that were originally planned for expansions.

=== After release ===
Through expansinos, Vaccarino has added new rules to prevent undesirable game situations and add new mechanics. In 2016, Rio Grande Games began releasing a second edition of several expansions, improving layout and adjusting card effects. In base game and Intrigue, some cards were removed, and more powerful ones were added. Upgrade packs for players who already owned the first editions of these sets were also sold. Second edition versions of the Seaside, Prosperity, Hinterlands, Cornucopia, and Guilds expansions were released in 2022 and 2024.

== Releases ==
Numerous expansions have been released for Dominion, and mini-expansions, most consisting of a set of a single kind of kingdom card, have been released as promotional items. Intrigue has been recommended as the first expansion to purchase after the base set for play. Vaccarino originally planned to stop expanding the game after Guilds, though he conceded:

"Still, it’s likely that at some point the publishers will want another expansion and, well, I like to be friendly. So I can't guarantee that Guilds is the end of the line, but you can at least think of it as a dividing point between regular expansions and occasional expansions."

Two "Big Box" sets have been released. The first contained Dominion First Edition, Alchemy, Prosperity, and the promotional cards Envoy and Black Market. Later editions included alternate promotional cards: Walled Village and Governor. This was released in 2010 and is no longer available. Big Box II was released in 2016, and contains Dominion Second Edition, Intrigue Second Edition, and additional base cards for 5 and 6 player games.

After the release of Menagerie in 2020, Dominion included 585 differently named cards and landscapes (such as events), and there were 366 kingdom card piles, including the 6 each in the 1st Edition Base and Intrigue releases that were later replaced. In 2021, researchers calculated that there were over 66 sextillion possible unique game combinations.

Since the game and its expansions feature over 4,000 individual cards, Rio Grande Games has licensed manufacturers' creation of containers to store all the cards into one or two boxes.

Name	Release Date	Type	Cards	Kingdom Card Piles
Dominion	October 2008 (1st ed); October 2016 (2nd ed)	Base game	500	25 (1st ed); 26 (2nd ed)
Envoy	November 2008	Promotional card	11	1
Black Market	March 2009	Promotional card	11	1
Intrigue	July 2009 (1st ed); October 2016 (2nd ed)	Expansion	500 (1st ed); 300 (2nd ed)	25 (1st ed); 26 (2nd ed)
Seaside	October 2009 (1st ed); June 2022 (2nd ed)	Expansion	300	26 (1st ed); 27 (2nd ed)
Stash	February 2010	Promotional card	11	1
Alchemy	May 2010	Expansion	150	12
Prosperity	October 2010 (1st ed); June 2022 (2nd ed)	Expansion	300	25
Cornucopia	June 2011	Expansion	150	13
Walled Village	June 2011	Promotional card	11	1
Hinterlands	October 2011 (1st ed); July 2022 (2nd ed)	Expansion	300	26
Governor	October 2011	Promotional card	11	1
Base Cards	June 2012	Replacement cards	250	0
Dark Ages	August 2012	Expansion	500	35
Guilds	June 2013	Expansion	150	13
Prince	June 2014	Promotional card	11	1
Adventures	April 2015	Expansion	400	30
Summon	Autumn 2015	Promotional Event	1	0
Empires	June 2016	Expansion	300	24
Dominion Update Pack	October 2016	Replacement cards	80	7
Dominion Intrigue Update Pack	October 2016	Replacement cards	80	7
Sauna/Avanto	October 2016	Promotional card (split pile)	11	1
Nocturne	November 2017	Expansion	500	33
Dismantle	December 2017	Promotional card	11	1
Renaissance	November 2018	Expansion	300	25
Captain	July 2019	Promotional card	11	1
Church	July 2019	Promotional card	11	1
Menagerie	March 2020	Expansion	400	30
Allies	March 2022	Expansion	400	31
Seaside Update Pack	June 2022	Replacement cards	100	9
Prosperity Update Pack	July 2022	Replacement cards	100	9
Hinterlands Update Pack	July 2022	Replacement cards	100	9
Plunder	December 2022	Expansion	500	40
Marchland	February 2024	Promotional card	13	1
Cornucopia & Guilds Update Pack	March 2024	Replacement cards	100	8
Rising Sun	September 2024	Expansion	300	25
Arcana	2026 (predicted)	Expansion	?	?

== Digital versions ==
Several unofficial online implementations of Dominion existed before there was a licensed online version. Rio Grande Games requested that these be discontinued after the official online implementation was released. One of these unofficial implementations, dominion.isotropic.org, was used by Dominion designer Donald X. Vaccarino and his playtesters during the development of new cards, even after the site was closed to the public.

A licensed browser-based online implementation of Dominion, hosted by Goko, went live in early March 2013. It was originally intended to be released to the public on August 16, 2012, but because of bugs and sever load, it was withdrawn from public release and returned to beta testing. The official app provided the base Dominion game free to play, and cards from the expansions available for a fee. In October 2015, the official Goko online implementation of Dominion transitioned to a new official 2.0 online implementation developed by Making Fun. Making Fun honored all purchases made by customers from the original Goko implementation, but in February 2016, John Welch, CEO of Making Fun, announced that the license granted to Making Fun by Rio Grande Games to develop the official online Dominion game was set to expire at the end of 2016 and would not be renewed.

From January 1, 2017, development of the official online Dominion game is licensed to Shuffle iT, a company formed by two high-ranked Dominion players. They were dissatisfied with prior online implementations of Dominion and proposed their new approach to Vaccarino, who was impressed with what the two developers were able to do and gave them the license.

Temple Gates Games released a licensed version of Dominion for Microsoft Windows, iOS and Android devices in early access in October 2021. This game included artificial intelligence using neural networks for its computer opponents, which the developers claim was advanced enough to be able to learn new cards that were not used in training. The game offers a free-to-play base Dominion game, with paid downloadable content for each of the card game's expansions.

== Reception ==
Dominion set won the Spiel des Jahres, the Deutscher Spiele Preis, an Origins award and a Diana Jones Award. It and the expansions have sold more than 2.5 million copies and have been translated into 18 languages: Chinese, Czech, Dutch, Finnish, French, German, Greek, Hungarian, Italian, Japanese, Korean, bokmål Norwegian, Polish, Portuguese, Romanian, Russian, Spanish and Swedish.

Dominion is one of the first deck-building games. Many board games, including Mage Knight Board Game and many video games, such as Slay the Spire, use deckbuilding as a core game mechanic.

Dominion has been praised for its speed, simplicity, and strategic depth. Reviewers have noted the game’s replayability. However, it has been criticised as "almost abstract" and weakly themed, and has been described as "multiplayer solitaire", although a minor issue in the playability.

=== Dominion and the Kennerspiel Des Jahres ===
The Spiel des Jahres is a highly prestigious prize, primarily intended for family games. The winner is generally purchased in large volume within Germany. Dominion received this prize in 2009. Two years later, a second prize, Kennerspiel des Jahres, was created, intended for more complex games aimed at audiences of adults; the name literally means "Expert-game of the year". Dominion's prize had received backlash, as some families considered it too complex for a family game. This has been credited as an influential event in the establishment of the Kennerspiel prize. In both the year prior to Dominion's award, and the year following, complex games received ad-hoc special prizes, which had been awarded intermittently in earlier years. It has been stated that 2009 was notable in that a complex game received an award, but crowded out the 'main' family-game award.

=== Awards ===
- 2008 Origins Award for Best Traditional Card Game
- 2008 Meeples Choice Awards
- 2009 Spiel Des Jahres
- 2009 Deutscher Spiele Preis
- 2009 Mensa Select
- 2009 Golden Geek Award (Game of the Year & Card Game of the Year)
- 2009 Diana Jones Award for Excellence in Gaming
- 2009 Origins Award, Best Card Game
- 2009 BoardGamer.ru (Russia), Best Card Game of the Year
- 2009 Boughtalot.ru, best game of the year
