= List of Deadlands: The Weird West publications =

This is a list of the publications released for the roleplaying game Deadlands: The Weird West, published by Pinnacle Entertainment Group. The game was originally released using its own custom rules, and has since been published using the d20 system, GURPS and Savage Worlds rules.

The Deadlands world was expanded with a post-apocalyptic setting entitled Deadlands: Hell on Earth; a list of the publications for this setting can be found here.

== Deadlands: The Weird West ==
The original Deadlands system used a custom set of rules and was published by Pinnacle Entertainment Group.

=== Core Rulebooks ===
Title	Description	Publication year
Deadlands: The Weird West Roleplaying Game	Core rulebook	1996
The Quick & The Dead	Expanded general rules	1997
Tales o' Terror: 1877	Expanded setting detail, advances in-game chronology one year	1998
Weird West Player's Guide	Core rulebook	1999
Marshal's Handbook	Core rulebook	1999
Deadlands Classic: 20th Anniversary Edition Core Rulebook	Core rulebook	2017

=== Character Classes ===
Title	Description	Publication year
Book o' the Dead	New rules for playing undead characters	1997
Ghost Dancers	Expanded rules for playing shaman characters	1998
Hucksters & Hexes	Expanded rules for playing magical characters	1998
Fire & Brimstone	Expanded rules for played blessed and holy characters	1998
Law Dogs	Expanded rules for playing law enforcement characters	1998
Lone Stars: the Texas Rangers	New rules for playing Texas Ranger characters	2001
The Agency: Men in Black Dusters	New rules for playing Agency characters. It's also a tie-in with the Deadlands: Doomtown card game.	2003

=== Locations ===
Title	Description	Year
The Great Maze	Boxed set including maps and a rulebook detailing the labyrinth of chasms that was once California, an adventure, and rules for martial arts characters	1997
City o' Gloom	Boxed set of maps and information for setting adventures in Salt Lake City, as well as advanced rules for mechanical augmentations and a game called skullchucker	1997
Lost Angels	Maps and information for setting adventures in Los Angeles	1998
River o' Blood	Boxed set including maps and rulebooks for setting adventures in New Orleans or on a Mississippi riverboat, as well as an adventure and rules for voodoo	1998
Back East: The North	Maps and information for setting adventures in the Northern states of America	1999
Back East: The South	Maps and information for setting adventures in the Southern states of America	1999
Doomtown or Bust!	Maps and information for setting adventures in the town of Gomorrah, California, a tie-in with the Deadlands: Doomtown collectible card game	1999
South o' the Border	Maps and information for setting adventures in Mexico	1999
Boomtowns	Boxed set including descriptions of several towns, an adventure, and tiles for designing new towns for use in Deadlands or Great Rail Wars.	2000
The Collegium	Information for setting adventures in the Distinguished Collegium of Interspatial Physics, as well as new inventions and expanded rules for Mad Scientist characters. It's also a tie-in with the Deadlands: Doomtown card game.	2000
The Great Weird North	Maps and information for setting adventures in Canada	2002

=== Adventures ===
Title	Description	Publication year
Devils Tower 1: The Road to Hell	The first part of a high-level adventure set in Salt Lake City.	1998
Devils Tower 2: Heart o' Darkness	The second part of the Devil's Tower adventure	1998
Devils Tower 3: Fortress o' Fear	The epic Devil's Tower adventure comes to its conclusion	1998
Canyon o' Doom	An adventure which sends the players in search of the City of Ghouls in the depths of the Grand Canyon.	1999
Bloody Ol' Muddy	An ancient evil awakes beneath the waters of the Mississippi	1999
Ghost Busters	A top Agency operative, known only as the Ghost, is kidnapped from Gomorrah, and the posse track him down.	2000
Rain o' Terror	A Mad Scientist's airship is stolen, along with a weapon of terrible power, and the posse must race against time to get it back.	2000
Dead Presidents	The posse start by looking into suspicious activity in Gomorra and end up being involved in an enormous, nationwide conspiracy.	2000

=== Dime Novels ===
Deadlands Dime Novels were works of short fiction, primarily starring undead gunslinger Ronan Lynch, which also included maps and statistics which gamemasters could use to incorporate elements from the story into their game.

Title	Product Number	Description	Year
Perdition's Daughter	PEG9000 (DN#1)	Details Ronan's background and his battle against an evil cult.	1996
Independence Day	PEG9001 (DN#2)	Ronan is hired by Wyatt Earp and Batt Masterton to keep the peace in Dodge City on the Fourth of July.	1996
Night Train	PEG9002 (DN#3)	Ronan finds himself aboard the legendarily haunted Night Train. Includes a scenario for Deadlands: The Great Rail Wars.	1997
Under a Harrowed Moon pt. 1: Strange Bedfellows	PEG9003 (DN#4)	Ronan must ally with a pack of werewolves against a common foe in an official crossover with White Wolf's Werewolf: The Wild West setting	1997
Under a Harrowed Moon pt. 2: Savage Passage	PEG9004 (DN#5)	Ronan and his companions cross worlds from the Weird West to the Savage West along with their werewolf companions	1998
Under a Harrowed Moon pt. 3: Ground Zero	PEG9005 (DN#6)	The conclusion to the trilogy; both worlds hang in the balance as the heroes battle the evil Dr. Hellstromme. Includes a tie-in scenario for Deadlands: The Great Rail Wars.	1998
The Forbidden God	PEG9006 (DN#7)	Ronan Lynch is crossing the Great Salt Flats of Utah when he stumbles across an ancient Spanish galleon miles from any ocean.	1998
Adios, A-Mi-Go!	PEG9007 (DN#8)	Ronan finds himself face to face with the terrors of the Cthulhu Mythos in an official crossover with Chaosium's Call of Cthulhu	1998
Skinners	PEG9008 (DN#9)	Ronan must battle a horror that wants to skin him alive on a haunted Mississippi riverboat.	1999
Worms!	PEG9009 (DN#10)	Ronan finds himself in the town of Hilton Springs, Nevada, which is on brink of destruction by Mojave Rattlers, enormous underground sand worms.	1999

=== Miscellaneous ===
Title	Product Number	Description	Year
Marshal Law	PEG1009	Package containing a GM screen, revised character sheets and two new adventures	1996
Smith & Robards catalog [c.1877]	PEG1004	Additional equipment and inventions	1997
Rascals, Varmints & Critters	PEG1006	Catalogue of monsters and antagonists	1998
Twisted Tales	PEG1007	Notebook for players to keep notes on their adventures, as well as a set of expanded character sheets	1998
Hexarcana	PEG1032	Additional rules for huckster characters as well as new spells	1999
Marshal's Log	PEG1022	Notebook for Marshal (GM) to keep adventure notes and NPC details	1999
Rascals, Varmints & Critters II: The Book of Curses	PEG1029	Catalogue of monsters and antagonists	2000
The Black Circle: Unholy Alliance	PEG1036	Information on a conspiracy amongst a number of Deadlands villains, including Black River, the Bayou Vermillion, and the Whateley family. It's also a tie-in with The Great Rail Wars miniatures rules and the Deadlands: Doomtown card game.	2000

=== Accessories ===
Title	Product Number	Description	Year
Poker Decks	PEG2007	Package containing 2 54-card poker decks. The artwork uses Deadlands personalities for the Face Cards	1997
Ghost Rock Dice	PEG2016	Package containing a set of 6 black polyhedral dice with white numbering (d4, d6, d8, d10, d12, and d20)	?
Poker Chips	PEG2017	Package containing 70 plastic mini poker chips (40 white, 20 red and 10 blue)	?

=== Cardstock Cowboys ===
Cardstock Cowboys were a line of 3D stand-up figures that could be used for miniature-based combat in Deadlands games, available in a series of themed packs.

Title	Product Number	Description	Publication year
Starter Pack	PEG2701	A basic set of standups matching the starting archetypes and common enemies of the main game	2000
Horrors of the Weird West	PEG2702	Standups of all monsters from both volumes of Rascals, Varmints & Critters	2000
Infernal Devices	PEG2703	Standups for a wide variety of mechanical constructions	2000

=== Fiction ===
Title	Description	Publication year
A Fistful O' Dead Guys	A collection of short stories set in the Deadlands setting	1999
For A Few Dead Guys More	A second collection of short stories set in the Deadlands setting	1999
The Good, The Bad, and The Dead	The final collection of short stories set in the Deadlands setting	1999

== Deadlands: The Weird West d20 ==
In 2001, Wizards of the Coast, produced a set of Deadlands rulebooks using their d20 system.

Title	Description	Year
Deadlands: d20	Core rulebook	2001
Horrors o' the Weird West	Catalogue of monsters and antagonists	2001
The Way of the Brave	Expanded rules for playing Native American characters	2001
The Way of the Dead	Expanded rules for playing undead characters	2001
The Way of the Gun	Expanded rules for playing gunslinger characters	2001
The Way of the Huckster	Expanded rules for playing magical characters	2001
The Way of the New Science	Expanded rules for playing Mad Scientist	2001
The Way of the Righteous	Expanded rules for played blessed and holy characters	2001

== Deadlands Reloaded ==
In 2006, Pinnacle Entertainment Group again began publishing Deadlands using their Savage Worlds rules, under the name Deadlands: Reloaded. It requires the original Savage Worlds rulebook to use. In 2012 they began publishing Savage Worlds rulebooks for the Hell on Earth setting as well.

=== Core Rulebooks ===
Title	Description	Publication year
Player's Guide	Core rulebook for players. Contains Savage Worlds rules for the Deadlands setting and updates the in-game year to 1879. Available in both standard size and smaller "Explorer's Edition"	2006
Marshal's Handbook	Core rulebook for gamemasters. Contains Savage Worlds rules for the Deadlands setting and updates the in-game year to 1879. Available in both standard size and smaller "Explorer's Edition"	2006
Deadlands: The Weird West; Savage Worlds Adventure Edition	Core rulebook revised for compatibility with SWADE. The timeline updates the in-game year to 1884 and the metaplot has been retconned to remove the Confederacy as a faction.	2021

=== Adventures ===
Savage Worlds adventures come in two formats - Savage Tales, which are designed as standalone adventures, and Plot Point campaigns, which are looser in design and made up of a series of self-contained adventures which link together and build to a climax over time, with the intention that smaller events be woven throughout at the GM's discretion.

Title	Description	Publication year
Coffin Rock	A Savage Tale which finds the posse in the tiny town of Coffin Rock as all hell breaks loose	2008
Don't Drink the Water	A Savage Tale in which the posse travel to Mexico, avoid the foreign legion and get mixed up in a revolution	2009
Doomtown: A Fight They'll Never Forget	Set in the fallout of a conspiracy that lead to the very public murders of Roderick Byre and Wilbur Crowley—Gomorra's latest mayoral candidates. This takes place prior to the Plot Point Campaign The Flood.	
The Flood	A Plot Point campaign which involves the posse in the Great Rail Wars and the battle to secure California's ghost rock supplies, pitting them against the evil Reverend Grimme. Includes new rules for martial arts and steam vessels as well as extensive details on California's Great Maze.	2009
Murder on the Hellstromme Express	The posse find themselves on a train packed with Mad Scientists, travelling to Kansas Scientific Exposition, all competing for a contract with Hellstromme Industries	2009
Night Train 2: For Whom the Whistle Blows	A sequel to the classic Deadlands adventure Night Train. Baron LaCroix returns with a revitalised terror weapon and a new plan to win the Great Rail Wars	2010
Saddle Sore	A set of encounters and short adventures designed for use while the posse travels from one point in the Weird West to another	2010
Devil's Night	A Savage Tale set in Wichita, Kansas, in which several people have fallen into comas, and the locals claim that the Devil is coming to claim their souls. The adventure was released as a free PDF and requires the Savage Worlds Horror Companion.	2011
Blood Drive 1: Bad Times on the Goodnight	The first part of the Blood Drive campaign, which sees the posse join a cattle drive that spans the length of the Weird West. The three modules may be played as separate adventures or one after the other.	2012
Blood Drive 2: High Plains Drovers	The second part of the Blood Drive campaign	2012
Guess Whose Coming To Donner	The posse travel to Truckee Pass in the Sierra Nevadas to locate a missing party, and find themselves falling foul of cannibalistic locals	2012
The Last Sons	A Plot Point campaign which involves the posse in the ongoing war between Native American and government factions in the disputed territories. Includes expanded rules for shaman characters as well as extensive new detail on The Agency and the Texas Rangers, as well as several self contained Savage Tales, one of which is a Reloaded conversion of the classic Deadlands adventure Night Train.	2012
Return to Manitou Bluff	Clover Mesa, better known as Manitou Bluff, was once the dumping grounds for the dregs of the Great Maze, and now that a motherlode of Ghost Rock has been uncovered, the Wasatch Rail Corporations, Kang's Triad and more are going to war for it.	2012
Blood Drive 3: Range War!	The conclusion of the Blood Drive campaign.	2012
Dead Men Walkin’	This is Shane Hensley's personal convention adventure he usually runs by invitation only for players up for a little more abuse and mayhem than usual.	2015
Stone and a Hard Place	The third Servitor Plot Point Campaign. Stone and a Hard Place details the strange locales, characters of the American Southwest, provides new Edges and abilities for Harrowed and hexslingers, new Setting Rules to emulate Death's grip on the land, Savage Tales, abominations, and a Plot Point Campaign that pits a posse against Stone!	2015
Perilous Parcels: All the Purty Little Horses	This adventure introduces a series of One Sheet adventures.	2016
Twilight Protocol	Texas Rangers and U.S. Agents are working together to unravel one of Hellstromme's plots, and your posse gets caught in the crossfire!	2016
Paradise Lost	An unscheduled train is rolling into the station, it's bringing Hell with it–just maybe not the one you'd expect given the author of this nightmare, John “Night Train” Goff.	2017
Knights with no Armor	A veteran level adventure set along the Mexican border.	2017
Good Intentions	The fourth and final Servitor Plot Point Campaign. It involves the plans of Dr. Hellstromme in the Nation of Deseret. It includes rules for new-and-improved Blessed, Metal Mages, new gear, infernal devices and steam-augmentations. It also has details on strange locales in and around the City o’ Gloom, an Adventure Generator customized for the region, a herd of new Savage Tales.	2017
A Tale of Two Killers	The posse arrives in Dante's Ferry, a town surrounded by Deadlands. There's weird horrors to confront and a showdown involving Jasper Stone (the "Deathly Drifter") and The Cackler (the oldest Harrowed).	2020

=== One Sheet adventures ===
Title	Description
Eyes Like Embers	Four specimens of a new type of nosferatu are on the loose in a S&R train yard.
...Is That You?	A suspenseful little tale when your pistoleros pass through the Spotswood Trading Post in Roswell.
Mound of Doom	An adventure against giant ants.
Perilous Parcels: Ruckus at Worm Creek	Delivering packages for the Smith & Robards’ Express Delivery Service
Perilous Parcels: Salt o’ the Earth	Delivering packages for the Smith & Robards’ Express Delivery Service
Shotgun Wedding	After chasing the Shaw Gang to Canyon Diablo, cowpokes find themselves in a Rail War!
Showdown at Canyon Diablo	After chasing the Shaw Gang to Canyon Diablo, cowpokes find themselves in a Rail War!
Strikebreakers	A strike leader needs help.
Soul-Stealer Box, The	This tale is a tough one, Marshal! To succeed, your heroes need to use wits as well as brawn.

=== Locations ===
Title	Description	Publication year
Territory Guide #1 - Newfoundland: Rock of Ages	Information, maps and adventure ideas for locations in Newfoundland	2004
Trail Guide: The Great Northwest	Information, maps, several Savage Tales and a mini Plot Point campaign set in Montana, Oregon, Washington, and Idaho.	2010
Trail Guide: South o' the Border	Information, maps and adventure ideas for locations in Mexico, including several Savage Tales and a mini Plot Point campaign	2010
Trail Guide: Weird White North	Information, maps and adventures detailing the North, including Alaska and British Columbia	2011
Trail Guides: Volume I	An omnibus containing The Great Northwest, South o' the Border and Weird White North	2012
Ghost Towns	Maps and information on seven minor towns around the Weird West, as well as rules and tools for quickly creating new towns on the fly.	2012

=== Fiction ===
Title	Description	Publication year
Beast of Fire	A Dime Novel in which the posse find themselves trapped between the Menominee Indians of Northern Wisconsin and the Manitou who preys on them. Contains stats for playing the original Deadlands, d20 and Savage Worlds rules.	2005
Deadshot	A Dime Novel featuring the town of Hoba Hills, which is hosting a quickdraw competition in which the posse becomes involved. Only Savage Worlds rules are provided.	2006
Frostbite	A Dime Novel - In a small town on Mount Frostbite, the posse must solve a series of murders which may lead back to an old evil in the town's history. Only Savage Worlds rules are provided.	2006
Deluge: A Novel of the Flood	A novelization of the Deadlands: The Flood plot-point campaign by John Goff	2008

=== Miscellaneous ===
Title	Description	Publication year
Marshal's Screen	A gamemaster's screen with quick reference tables on the back. Comes bundled with the Murder on the Hellstromme Express Savage Tale.	2009
1880 Smith & Robards Catalog	Expanded equipment list and new rules for Mad Science and steam augmentations, as well as backstory on the Smith & Robards corporation	2011
Conversion Guide	Convert between Reloaded and Classic Deadlands	

=== Accessories ===
Title	Description	Publication year
Deadlands Weird West Bennies	A set of 20 white Bennie chips, 10 red Bennie chips, 5 blue Bennie chips and 5 yellow Legendary Bennie chips. Each denomination has artwork depicting a major character from the Deadlands universe.	?
Deadlands Weird West Extra Bennies	A set of 30 white Bennie chips, 15 red Bennie chips, and 5 blue Bennie chips. This completes a Bennie set to have the original 50:25:10:5 ratio of the Classic Deadlands Fate Chips pool.	?
Map Pack 1: Temple of the Sun	A detailed map of an Aztec temple for use in miniature combat	2012
Skullchucker Arena Combat Map	A 24- by 30-inch Skullchucker map with a 1″ grid.	
Blood, Sweat, and Gears: The Chase	Atmospheric original music for Deadlands: Good Intentions.	
Cackler Graphic Novel	The Cackler is looking for a blood relative that may change the face of Deadlands forever.	
Art of the Weird West	The amazing art that has shown us this savage world of six-guns, sorcery, monsters, and magic!	

=== Archetypes ===
Each publication features several pregenerated character with art, background, and statistics.

Title	Description
Heroes o’ Gloom Archetypes	Six archetypes fit for the City o' Gloom.
Lone Killers of the Southwest	Five deadly real-life gunmen.
Stone and a Hard Place: The Tombstone Seven	Seven characters ready to play Stone and a Hard Place

=== Deadlands Noir ===
- Tenement Men (Kickstarter Exclusive Dime Novel) (2012; PDF)

== GURPS Deadlands ==
Also in 2001, a number of Deadlands rulebooks using the GURPS system were released under license by Steve Jackson Games

Title	Description	Publication year
GURPS Deadlands: Weird West	Core rulebook	2001
Dime Novel 1 - Aces and Eights		2001
Dime Novel 2 - Wanted: Undead or Alive		2001
Hexes	Expanded rules for magical characters	2002
Varmints	Catalogue of monsters and antagonists	2003

== Deadlands: The Great Rail Wars ==
Deadlands: The Great Rail Wars was a skirmish oriented miniatures game produced by Pinnace Entertainment Group for the Deadlands setting. The following are the rulebooks and expansions published for the game.

Title	Description	Publication year
Deadlands: The Great Rail Wars	Boxed set including the core rulebook, miniatures and cards needed to start playing.	1997
Reinforcements	Extra copies of the unit cards in the original boxed set, as well as blank troop cards for creating new units.	1997
Derailed	Adds rules for oversized land, air and sea rigs, as well as trains, including the required troop cards, upgrade cards and counters.	1998
A Fist Full of Ghost Rock	Includes expanded rules for duels, experience and veteran troops, as well as a number of new scenarios.	1998
Dogs o' War	Adds a number of new troops for every faction, as well as a new scenario which follows on from one of those included in A Fist Full of Ghost Rock	1998
Cry Havoc	Adds two new hero classes, as well as new spells, Harrowed powers, gizmos, Edges and Hindrances. Adds new rules for battlefields, duelling and weather effects.	1998
High Noon	A free PDF version of the miniatures rules that was available on the website.	2000
Raid on Roswell	A scenario focused on a mysterious flying disc seen over Fort 51, and the race between the various Rail Barons to secure its mysteries for themselves.	2001
Deadlands: The Great Rail Wars	The revised Second Edition core rulebook.	2001

== Novels ==
- Deluge: A Novel of the Flood, a novelization of the Deadlands: The Flood plot-point campaign (by John Goff, 2008)
- Deadlands: Ghostwalkers (by Jonathan Maberry, published by Tor Books in 2015)
- Deadlands: Thunder Moon Rising (by Jeffrey Mariotte, published by Tor Books in 2016)
- Deadlands: Boneyard (by Seanan McGuire, published by Tor Books in 2017)

== Comics ==
- Deadlands One Shot (Pinnacle and Image Comics, 1999)
- Deadlands: Black Water (Pinnacle, Image Comics and Visionary Comics, 2012)
- Deadlands: Death was Silent (Pinnacle, Image Comics and Visionary Comics, 2012)
- Deadlands: Massacre at Red Wing (Pinnacle, Image Comics and Visionary Comics, 2012)
- Deadlands: The Devil's Six Gun (Pinnacle, Image Comics and Visionary Comics, 2012)
- Deadlands: The Kid (Pinnacle, Visionary Comics, 2012)

== Other ==
- Fist Full Of Zombies - an All Flesh Must Be Eaten sourcebook with conversion notes from Deadlands to Unisystem (Eden Studios, 2004)
