= Deadlands: Lost Colony =

- Deadlands: Lost Colony cover
- Designers: Shane Lacy Hensley, John R. Hopler
- Publishers: Pinnacle Entertainment Group
- Publication: 2002
- Genres: Alternate history, science fiction, horror
- Systems: Custom

Deadlands: Lost Colony (or "Deadlands: the Way-Out West") is a genre-mixing alternate history roleplaying game which combines the science fiction and horror genres. The tropes of Western fiction are also prominent. It was written by Shane Lacy Hensley and David D Hillman and originally published by Pinnacle Entertainment Group. Lost Colony is the third game in the Deadlands setting, following on from Deadlands: The Weird West and Deadlands: Hell on Earth.

== Plot ==
The story is a continuation of that featured in the Deadlands: Hell on Earth roleplaying game. Shortly before the Last War, a devastating nuclear war that allowed the Reckoners to ravage the Earth and turn it into a nightmarish wasteland seen in Hell on Earth, a trans-dimensional gateway called the Tunnel was created between Earth and a distant planet called Banshee. The planet was rich in Ghost Rock, and small outposts were established in order to harvest it and ship them back to Earth. On Banshee, the human colonists had a number of run-ins with the local species, called Anouks, causing a war of their own. As the Last War heated up on Earth, the Tunnel was closed, leaving no way for the colonists on Banshee to return to Earth. Now they must make new lives on the planet, surrounded by hostile Anouks and various bands of human radicals. Uneasy tensions and a long, grueling war have left both the human colonists and the Anouks with massive death tolls, and fights occasionally still break out between the two. In addition, horrific supernatural monsters are beginning to appear on the planet as a consequence of the Reckoners, who (unbeknownst to the Banshee colonists) have found themselves also stranded on Banshee.

== Character types ==
As a continuation of Deadlands: Hell on Earth, Lost Colony features a number of similar character types to both the Weird West and Hell on Earth. Sykers, Harrowed, and Cyborgs are available as playable options, and while not expressly stated, many other character classes such as Hucksters, Martial Artists and Blessed are also playable. The following character classes are unique to Lost Colony:

- Colonial Rangers - Similar to the Law Dogs from Deadlands: the Weird West, the Colonial Rangers are an organized collective of law enforcers. The Rangers are the body of law for the human colonists on Banshee. Their numbers and equipment are stretched thin, and some miners and companies simply ignore them. However, the group is very influential in the game, and are one of the "Big Player groups" of the setting.
- Mutes - This new arcane background centers around the reconstruction of objects. Mutes, or Transmuters, use a special nanobot implant to reshape items from one form to another. A Mute needs a roughly similar number of components in order to construct something, and must have a schematic for the desired loaded into his cybernetic systems. They are a similar class to the Mad Scientists and Junkers of the previous settings, though they their own hangups and dark secrets.
- Anouk Warriors - Lost Colony is unique in that humans are no longer to sole playable character type. Anouk Warriors form the bulk of the Anouk tribes. Physically stronger and more magically attuned than humans, Anouks have a series of abilities that allow them to manipulate a common substance called Tannis. While most Anouks are similar to Indian Braves from Deadlands or Savages from Hell on Earth, some Anouks opt for human equipment instead of traditional arms.
- Anouk Shamans - In addition to Anouk Warriors, tribal Shamans can be played. On top of the Warriors' Tannis-related abilities, Shamans get a number of other powers.
- Banshee Born - An odd and potentially magical character type, Banshee Born are humans born on Banshee, as opposed to being from Earth. The Anouks say that these Banshee Born humans are more favored by the planet, and some have manifested magical powers. Players can either choose the free Banshee Born edge at character creation, or opt for the more special, more expensive version of the edge. The more expensive edge increases the potential of gaining these new magical abilities.

Savage Worlds re-boot adds new character options:

- Breakers - Replace Mutes. During the EXFOR and Hellstromme Industries clash the former infected the Mutes equipment with a virus which made creating new things impossible. From that time they can only destroy and disrupt.
- Guardian - Certain characters are chosen after death by the living planet of Banshee and are re-born as Guardians. Equipped with a set of powers they are inclined to protect her.
- Razorjacks - Characters who get access to magical powers after being implanted by the Hellstromme Industries with an experimental cybernetics device containing a malevolent spirit.

== Releases ==
The game was preceded by the card game Deadlands: Lost Colony - Showdown, by the Clay and Susan Griffith novel called Banshee Screams, and the Hell on Earth lead-in adventure The Unity. Lost Colony saw only two rulebooks released, as well as the novel Banshee Screams, before Pinnacle Entertainment Group ceased publication of Deadlands material. In 2020 Pinnacle released Deadlands: Lost Colony as a setting book, using Savage Worlds Adventure Edition rules.

Title	Description	Year
Deadlands: Lost Colony	The core rulebook	2002
Lost Colony Companion	Expanded rules and setting detail	2002
Banshee Screams	A novel set on Banshee, featuring rookie Colonial Ranger Debbi Dallas, whose investigation of a conspiracy in the town of Temptation leads her into a battle between colonists, anouks, bandits and an ancient evil. The novel is designed as an introduction to the world of Lost Colony and is written by Clay and Susan Griffith.	2002
A Billion Miles from Home	A Savage Worlds scenario about a journey to the outer fringes of the Faraway system to discover the fate of the long-lost Bosphorous.	2019
Deadlands: Lost Colony	Reboot of the game as a setting book for Savage Worlds. The action takes place after the events from the earlier publications. Contains The Demon You Know plot point campaign.	2020
GM Screen with Widowmaker adventure	Game Master's screen with a supplement about running games on space stations. Includes a description of such facility (the title "Widowmaker") with two scenario ideas.	2020
Hellstromme Triumphant!	Short story about Vanessa, daughter of infamous Dr. Darius Hellstromme, rumoured to be a clone of his late wife. Includes also Out of the Frying Pan, a tale of Darius' first trip into the Abyss.	2020
Deadlands: Lost Colony figure flats	PDF with paper miniatures to be printed and used during a game.	2020
Deadlands: Lost Colony – Maw of Oblivion	Plot point campaign which takes place in the Faraway system, where the player characters will face the Reckoner, Famine. Contains space-oriented rules expansion (new character options and gear, space travel and combat rules), includes a gazeteer with information on the people and places of the Belt and scenario ideas.	2024
Deadlands: Lost Colony – Black City Map Pack 1	Wet and dry erasable maps presenting the interior of alien Black Cities.	2024

== See also ==
- List of Deadlands: The Weird West publications
- List of Deadlands: Hell on Earth publications

== Reviews ==
- Pyramid
