= List of Savage Worlds books =

The following is a listing of commercially released books from Pinnacle Entertainment Group and licensees for the Savage Worlds role-playing and miniatures game. This does not include various free downloads. Accessories such as card decks, screens and miniatures are also not listed.

== Great White Games/Pinnacle Entertainment Group ==
=== Core rules ===
- Savage Worlds: Fast! Furious! Fun! (1st Edition, 2003; hardcover. Revised edition, 2004; hardcover)
- Savage Worlds: Explorer's Edition)(1.5 Edition, 2007; digest-sized softcover)
- Savage Worlds: Deluxe Edition (2nd edition, 2011; hardcover)
- Savage Worlds: Deluxe Explorer's Edition (2.1 Edition, 2012; digest-sized softcover)
- Savage Worlds: Adventure Edition (2.2 Edition, 2019; hardcover. 2.2 Edition {version 4.2}, 2019; PDF.)

=== Savage Settings series ===
- Evernight: The Darkest Setting of All (2003; hardcover)
- East Texas University / Degrees of Horror (2014; hardcover)
- 50 Fathoms: High Adventure in a Drowned World (2003; hardcover)
- 50 Fathoms Companion (2004; PDF)
- Necessary Evil: Supervillains Must Rise Where Heroes Fall (2004; hardcover)
- Low Life: The Rise of the Lowly (2005; hardcover)
- Rippers: Horror Roleplaying in the Victorian Age (2005; hardcover)
- Rippers Companion (2007; PDF)
- The Savage World of Solomon Kane (2007; hardcover)
- Solomon Kane: Travelers' Tales (2008; softcover)
- The Savage Foes of Solomon Kane (2010; hardcover)
- Slipstream (2008; hardcover)
- Necessary Evil: Explorer's Edition (2009; softcover)
- Solomon Kane Bennies (2009)
- Necessary Evil Bennies (2010)
- Slipstream Bennies (2010)
- Lankhmar: City of Thieves (2015: hardcover)
- Lankhmar: Savage Seas of Nehwon (2018: hardcover)
- The Savage World of Flash Gordon RPG (2018; hardcover)
- The Savage World of Flash Gordon: Kingdoms of Mongo (2018; hardcover)

=== Weird Wars ===
- Tour of Darkness (2004; hardcover)
- Necropolis 2350 (2006; softcover)
- Weird War Two (2009; hardcover)
- Weird War Two Bennies (2009)
- Weird Wars Rome (2013)
- Weird War One (2016)

=== Deadlands ===
- Deadlands: Reloaded! (2006; hardcover)
- Deadlands: Coffin Rock (2008; softcover)
- Deadlands: The Flood, Plot Point Campaign (2009; PDF, hardcover)
- Deadlands: The Flood Player's Guide (2009; free PDF)
- Deadlands: Marshal's Screen / Murder on the Hellstromme Express adventure (2009; hardcover gamemaster's screen, softcover booklet)
- Deadlands: Don't Drink the Water (2009; PDF)
- Deadlands: Murder on the Hellstromme Express (2009; PDF)
- Deadlands Fate Chips (2009)
- Deadlands: Saddle Sore (2010; PDF)
- Deadlands Trail Guide: South o' the Border (2010; PDF)
- Deadlands Player's Guide (2010; 2nd Printing; hardcover)
- Deadlands Marshal's Handbook (2010; 2nd Printing; hardcover)
- Deadlands: For Whom the Whistle Blows–Night Train 2 (2010; PDF)
- Deadlands Trail Guide: The Great Northwest (2010; PDF)
- Deadlands: The 1880 Smith & Robards Catalog (2011; PDF/softcover)
- Deadlands Trail Guide: Weird White North (2011; PDF)
- Deadlands: Devil's Night (2011; free PDF)
- Deadlands Player's Guide (2012; 3rd Printing; softcover)
- Deadlands Marshal's Handbook (2012; 3rd Printing; softcover)
- Deadlands: The Last Sons, Plot Point Campaign (2012; PDF, hardcover)
- Deadlands: The Last Sons Player's Guide, (2012; free PDF)
- Deadlands: Guess Who's Coming to Donner (2012; PDF)
- Deadlands: Trail Guides, Volume I (2012; PDF/softcover)
- Deadlands: Return to Manitou Bluff (2012; PDF/softcover)
- Deadlands: Bad Times on the Goodnight (Blood Drive I) (2012; PDF)
- Deadlands: Temple of the Sun (Map Pack 1) (2012; PDF)
- Deadlands: High Plains Drovers (Blood Drive II) (2012; PDF)
- Deadlands: Ghost Towns (2012; PDF/softcover)
- Deadlands: Range War! (Blood Drive III) (2012; PDF)

==== Deadlands: Hell on Earth ====
- Deadlands: Hell on Earth Reloaded (2012; PDF, hardcover)

==== Deadlands Noir ====
- Tenement Men (Kickstarter Exclusive Dime Novel) (2012; PDF)

=== Standalone RPGs ===
- Pirates of the Spanish Main (2007; hardcover)
- Space 1889: Red Sands (2010; hardcover)
- The Sixth Gun Role-Playing Game (2015; hardcover & Paperback)

=== Skirmishes ===
- Rippers: The Horror Wars (2004; softcover)
- Modern Ops (2005; print-on-demand)

=== Genre toolkits ===
- Fantasy Bestiary Toolkit (2005)
- Fantasy Gear Toolkit (2005)
- Fantasy World Builder Toolkit (2005)
- Fantasy Character Generator Toolkit (2005)
- Science Fiction Bestiary Toolkit (2005)
- Science Fiction Gear Toolkit (2006)
- Science Fiction World Builder Toolkit (2006)
- Pulp Gear Toolkit (2006)
- Pulp GM's Toolkit (2006)
- Horror Bestiary Toolkit (2006)
- Horror Companion (2011)
- Horror GM's Toolkit (2007)
- Fantasy Companion (2009; softcover)
- Science Fiction Companion (2013)
- Super Powers Companion (2009; softcover)
- Super Powers Companion: Second Edition (2013)
- Horror Companion (2012; softcover)
- Super Powers Companion (SWADE, 2022 PDF/hardcover)
- Fantasy Companion (SWADE, 2022 PDF/2023 hardcover)
- Horror Companion (SWADE, 2023 PDF/2024 hardcover)
- Science Fiction Companion (SWADE, 2024 PDF/2025 hardcover)

=== Adventures ===
- Privateer's Bounty (2003)
- Screamers (2003)
- On the Rocks (2003)
- Rise Alabama (2004)
- Noble Deceit (2004)
- Zombie Run (2004)
- Highwater War (2004)
- Smugglers Cove (2004)
- Prisoner of Pain (2004)
- Through the Cathode Ray Tube (2005)
- The Black Ankh (2005)
- Tales from the Forlorn Hope (2006)
- The Third Hand (2006)
- The Templar Legacy (2008)
- Death on Dartmoor (2008)
- The Night of Thoth (2008)
- Heart of Steel (2009)
- Bayonets, Buttons, & Blood (2009)
- Weird Wars: Island of Dreams (2011)

== Adamant Entertainment ==
=== Setting ===
- MARS (2009; PDF and softcover)
- Thrilling Tales (2009; PDF and softcover)

== Atomic Overmind Press ==
=== Setting ===
- The Day after Ragnarok (2009; PDF and softcover)

== Battlefield Press, Inc ==
=== Settings ===
- Sherwood: The Legend of Robin Hood (2009; PDF and softcover)
- Gaslight: Victorian Fantasy (2009; PDF and softcover)
- Eldritch Skies (2014; PDF and hardcover)
- Agents of G.A.I.A. (2018; PDF and hardcover)
- The Dinosaur Protocol (2019; PDF and hardcover)
- Pulp Fantastic (2020; PDF and hardcover)
- Bloodshadows: Chronicles of Guf (2022; PDF and softcover)
- Kaisers Gate (2025; PDF and hardcover)

=== Supplement ===
- Distant Vistas (2014; PDF and hardcover)
- Bloodshadows: Adversaries and Abominations (2022; PDF and softcover)

== FunSizedGames ==
=== Setting ===
- Streets of Bedlam: A Savage World of Crime + Corruption (2012; PDF and softcover)

=== Adventure ===
- Streets of Bedlam: Five-Story Drop (2013; PDF and softcover)

== Melior Via ==
=== Setting ===
- Accursed (2013; PDF and hardcover)

=== Supplement ===
- World of Morden (2016; softcover and hardcover)

=== Adventure ===
- Ill Omens (2014; softcover)

== GG Studio ==
=== Settings ===
- Enascentia (2013; PDF and softcover)
- Freak Control (2014; PDF and softcover)
- Ultima Forsan (2014; PDF and softcover)
- Warage - L'Alba degli Eroi (2014; PDF and softcover)

=== Supplements ===
- Deadlands: Messico & Nuvole (2014; PDF and softcover)
- Enascentia - Dietro lo Schermo (2014; PDF and softcover)

== Triple Ace Games ==
=== Settings ===
- Necropolis 2350 (2008; hardcover)
- Sundered Skies (2008; hardcover)
- Necropolis 2350: 2351-55 Update (2009; PDF and softcover)
- Hellfrost Player's Guide (2009; hardcover)
- Hellfrost Bestiary (2009; hardcover)
- Hellfrost Gazetteer (2009; hardcover)
- Sundered Skies Companion (2010; PDF and softcover)
- Hellfrost Encounters Book 1 (2010; PDF and hardcover)
- Hellfrost Expansion (2010; PDF and softcover)
- Wonderland No More (2011; softcover)

=== Genre toolkits ===
- Savage Worlds Handbook: Perilous Places & Serious Situations (2008; PDF)

=== Adventures ===
==== Daring Tales of Adventure ====
- #1: To End All Wars and Chaos on Crete (2008; PDF)
- #2: Web of the Spider Cult (2008; PDF)
- #3: Treasure of the Templars (2008; PDF)
- #4: The Talons of Lo-Peng (2008; PDF)
- #5: Sky Pirates of the Caribbean (2008; PDF)
- #6: The Palladium Peril (2008; PDF)
- #7: The Twelfth Gate (2008; PDF)
- #8: Terror of the Z-Bomb (2008; PDF)
- #9: Island of Terror (2009; PDF)
- #10: Kingdom of the Blood Gods (2009; PDF)
- #11: The Hands of Kali (2009; PDF)
- #12: Legacy of Tunguska (2009; PDF)
- #13: The Devil's Chalice (2009; PDF)
- #14: The Sword of Avalon (2009; PDF)
- #15: The Muramasa Curse (2009; PDF)
- #16: Empire of the Black Pharaoh (2009; PDF)
- Compendium #01 (2009; Softback)
- Compendium #02 (2009; Softback)
- Compendium #03 (2009; Softback)
- Compendium #04 (2010; Softback)
- Xmas DTA Special 2008: The Tale of the Fabulous Four (2008; PDF)
- Xmas DTA Special 2009: Rocket Nazis on the Orient Express (2009; PDF)

==== Daring Tales of Chivalry ====
- #1: A Knight's Tale (2008; PDF)
- #2: Death at the Joust (2008; PDF)
- #3: The Danbury Curse (2009; PDF)
- #4: Castle Fairstone & The Madness of Sir Stephen (2009; PDF)

==== Daring Tales of the Space Lanes ====
- #1: Waylaid on Wayland & Gunboat Diplomacy (2009; PDF)
- #2: Bad Debts (2009; PDF)
- #3: Robot Rumble (2009; PDF)
- #4: The Last Journey of The Exodus (2009; PDF)
- #5: The Black Guardian (2010; PDF)
- #6: The Stealer of Light (2010; PDF)
- #7: Deadly Chant (2010; PDF)
- #8: The Doomsday War (2014; PDF)

==== Hellfrost ====
- N1: Lair of the Vermin Lord (2009; PDF)
- N2: The Dark Seed (2009; PDF)
- N3: Shadow of Darkness (2009; PDF)
- N4: Pirates of the Crystalflow (2009; PDF)
- N5: The Eoster Festival (2010; PDF)
- S1: The Siege of Watchgap Fort (2009; PDF)
- S3: Descent Into Madness (2009; PDF)
- S2: The Lost City of Paraxus (2009; PDF)
- V1: The Heart of Winter (2009; PDF)
- V2: Against the Elements (2009; PDF)
- S4: The Ice Fiend and Other Tales (2010; PDF)
- V3: The Web of Deceit (2010; PDF)
- H1: Sins of the Father (2010; PDF)
- H2: The Blood of Godhammer (2010; PDF)
- L1: The Frost Giant's Hold (2010; PDF)
- S5: The Fey Tower and The Deadly Glade (2011; PDF)
- V4: Death in the Mire (2011; PDF)
- H3: The Blood Tide (2011; PDF)
- Compendium #1: Saga of the Frost Giants (2011; softcover)
- Compendium #2: Novice Adventures (2011; softcover)

==== Necropolis 2350 ====
- Tales from the Frontline #01 (2008; PDF)
- The Long Sleep (2008; PDF)
- The Last Word (2008; PDF)
- The Broken Seal (2009; PDF)
- Tales from the Frontline #02 (2009; PDF)
- Opener of the Ways (2010; PDF)
- Echoes (2010; PDF)

==== Sundered Skies ====
- The Ice Tower (2008; PDF)
- Fate of the Summoner (2008; PDF)
- Blade of Destiny (2008; PDF)
- Mind Thief (2009; PDF)
- The Race (2009; PDF)
- Within the Skies (2010; PDF)
- Mists of Savannah (2010; PDF)

==== Wonderland No More ====
- Egg of Seven Parts (2008; PDF)

=== Supplements ===
==== Daring Tales of Adventure ====
- Daring Tales Guide to Rocket Rangers (2011; PDF)
- Daring Tales Guide to Elite Nazi Units (2011; PDF)

==== Daring Tales of the Space Lanes ====
- Sector 01 (2010; PDF)
- Combat Hazards (2010; PDF)

==== Hellfrost ====
- Hellfrost Calendar (2010; PDF)
- Region Guide #1: Sacred Places (2010; PDF)
- Region Guide #2: The Liche Lands (2010; PDF)
- Region Guide #3: The Magocracy (2010; PDF)
- Region Guide #4: Orcmark (2010; PDF)
- Region Guide #5: Vestmark (2010; PDF)
- Region Guide #6: The Withered Lands (2010; PDF)
- Region Guide #7: Shattered Moor (2010; PDF)
- Region Guide #8: The Ten Seas (2010; PDF)
- Region Guide #9: Drachenlands (2010; PDF)
- Region Guide #10: Heligioland (2010; PDF)
- Region Guide #11: Ertha's Realm (2010; PDF)
- Region Guide #12: Witchwood (2010; PDF)
- Region Guide #13: Royalmark (2010; PDF)
- Region Guide #14: Veermark (2010; PDF)
- Region Guide #15: Crystalflow Confederacy (2010; PDF)
- Region Guide #16: Alantaris Isle (2010; PDF)
- Region Guide #17: The Great Swamp (2010; PDF)
- Region Guide #18: The Freelands (2010; PDF)
- Region Guide #19: Unclaimed Lands (2010; PDF)
- Region Guide #20: The Mistlands (2010; PDF)
- Region Guide #21: Chalcis (2010; PDF)
- Region Guide #22: Midmark (2010; PDF)
- Region Guide #23: The Battlelands (2010; PDF)
- Region Guide #24: Aspiria (2010; PDF)
- Region Guide #25: Ostmark (2010; PDF)
- Region Guide #26: Nordmark (2010; PDF)
- Region Guide #27: Angmark (2010; PDF)
- Region Guide #28: Blackstone Barony (2010; PDF)
- Region Guide #29: Barony of Cul (2010; PDF)
- Region Guide #30: Barony of Trond (2010; PDF)
- Region Guide #31: Cairn Lands (2010; PDF)
- Region Guide #32: Coglelund (2010; PDF)
- Region Guide #33: Freetown (2010; PDF)
- Region Guide #34: The Frozen Forest (2010; PDF)
- Region Guide #35: Giant's Throne (2011; PDF)
- Region Guide #36: The Glittersands (2011; PDF)
- Region Guide #37: Heldalund (2011; PDF)
- Region Guide #38: Icedale Freeholds (2011; PDF)
- Region Guide #39: Lakeland (2011; PDF)
- Region Guide #40: The Vale (2011; PDF)
- Region Guide #41: Seithrby (2011; PDF)
- Region Guide #42: Sutmark (2011; PDF)
- Region Guide #43: Angarion (2011; PDF)
- Region Guide #44: The Borderlands (2011; PDF)
- Region Guide #45: The Abyss (2011; PDF)
- Region Guide #46: Godsheim (2011; PDF)
- Region Guide #47: Isles of the Seareavers (2011; PDF)
- Resource Management (2011; PDF)
- Heroes & Villains 1 (2011; PDF)
- Heroes & Villains 2: Spellcasters (2011; PDF)
- Creature Guide Bufomi (2011; PDF)
- Creature Guide Kreana (2011; PDF)

== Daring Entertainment ==
=== Settings ===
==== Dawn of Legends ====
- Dawn of Legends (2009; PDF and softcover)
- Dawn of Legends Support Bundle (2009; PDF)

==== War of the Dead ====
- War of the Dead: Chapter One (2010; PDF and softcover)
- War of the Dead: Chapter Two (2011; PDF and softcover)
- War of the Dead: Chapter Three (2011; PDF and softcover)
- War of the Dead: Chapter Four (2012; PDF and softcover)

==== Super Powers Unleashed ====
- Super Powers Unleashed (2017; PDF and softcover)

=== Adventures ===
- G.E.T. Into Action: The Rising Storm (2009; PDF)
- War of the Dead: Dead of Night (2010; PDF)
- War of the Dead: Food For Thought (2010; PDF)
- War of the Dead: Outbreak at Hopewell (2010; PDF)
- Super Heroes Unleashed: Little Tin Gods (2017; PDF)

=== Supplements ===
- War of the Dead: The Paper Dead (Set 1) (2010; PDF)
- War of the Dead: Fan-Created Support (2010; PDF)
- War of the Dead: The Survivors (2010; PDF)
- War of the Dead: Values of Survival (2010; PDF)
- War of the Dead: The Survivors (Part 2) (2010; PDF)
- War of the Dead: The Digital Dead (2011; PDF)

== Evil DM Productions ==
=== Source book ===
- Legends of Steel (2009; hardcover)

== Gun Metal Games ==
=== Settings ===
- Interface Zero (2010; PDF and hardcover)
- Totems of the Dead: Player's Guide to the Untamed Lands (2011; PDF and hardcover)
- Totems of the Dead: Game Master's Guide (2011; PDF and hardcover)
- Interface Zero 2.0 (2014; PDF and hardcover)

== Happy Monster Press ==
=== Settings ===
- Children of the Apocalypse (2018; PDF and print-on-demand)
- Legion of Liberty: Superheroes of 1776 (2019; PDF and print-on-demand)

== Knight Errant Media ==
=== Settings ===
- Titan Effect: The Role-playing Game (2018; PDF and print-on-demand)
- Titan Effect RPG: Declassified Edition (2022; PDF and print-on-demand)

== Legion Publishing ==
=== Adventures ===
- Savage Features #1: Out of Sight (2004)
- Savage Features #2: The Last Round (2005)
- Savage Features #3: They Came From Beyond Space (2005)
- World of Meridian #1 - The Hunt (2005)
- World of Meridian #2 - All that Glisters (2006)
- World of Meridian #3 - Neveredge Falls (2003/2006)

=== Deadlands adventures and source books ===
- Deadlands Dime Novel #1 - Beast of Fire (2005; print-on-demand)
- Deadlands Dime Novel #2 - Deadshot (2006; print-on-demand)
- Deadlands Dime Novel #3 - Frostbite (2006; print-on-demand)
- Deadlands Territory Guide - Newfoundland: Rock of Ages (2004)

=== Weird Wars adventures ===
- Weird War II Mission Manual #1 - Bridge Across Time (2004)
- Weird War II Mission Manual #2 - Ice Fang (2004)
- Weird War II Mission Manual #3 - Gods of Destruction (2005)
- Weird War II Mission Manual #4 - Demonic Artillery (2005)

== Pirate Press ==
=== Setting ===
- The Battle for Oz (2014; PDF, hardcover, and softcover)

== Reality Blurs ==
=== Setting ===
- Runepunk (2007; hardcover)
- Ravaged Earth: The World of High-Powered Pulp (2008; softcover, regular and deluxe (color) editions)
- Runepunk: Darksummer Nights (2009; softcover)
- Runepunk: Steam & Shadow (2009; PDF)
- Agents of Oblivion: Player's Guide (2009; PDF)
- Realms of Cthulhu (2009; hardcover)
- Iron Dynasty: Way of the Ronin (2010; softcover)
- Agents of Oblivion - The Perfect Cocktail of Horror and Espionage (2011; PDF and softcover)
- Ravaged Earth: Revised Second Edition (2013; PDF and softcover)
- Karthador: Swashbuckling Science Fiction (2013; softcover)

=== Adventures ===
- Agents of Oblivion: Starfall Jungle (2005, PDF)
- Iron Dynasty: Journey to Red Temple (2005, PDF)
- Relics & Rumors #1 (2009, PDF)
- Relics & Rumors #2 (2009, PDF)
- Amazing Exploits #1: Quest for the Lost Oasis (2009, PDF)
- Old School Fantasy #1: A Keg For Dragon (2010, PDF and softcover)
- Relics & Rumors #3 (2010, PDF)
- Relics & Rumors #4 (2010, PDF)
- Old School Fantasy #2: Darkness Over Keryhk Nhor (2010, PDF and softcover)
- Old School Fantasy #3: Hunger of the Iron Mage (2010, PDF and softcover)
- Mythos Tales #1: Belly of the Beast (2011, PDF)
- Iron Dynasty: Kesshi Tales #1: The Wise Men & The Woods (2011, PDF)
- Iron Dynasty: Kesshi Tales #2: The Demon's Heart (2011, PDF)
- Iron Dynasty: Kesshi Tales #3: Fresh Blood (2011, PDF)
- Runepunk: Jobbers Tales #1: Whither Be Witherspoon? (2011, PDF)
- Old School Fantasy #4: Slave Pens of Moss Stone (2011, PDF)
- Old School Fantasy #5: Call of the Crow (2011, PDF)
- Old School Fantasy #6: Tangle in the Silver Vines (2011, PDF)
- Old School Fantasy #7: Rot & Ruin (2011, PDF)
- Old School Fantasy #8: Light & Dark (2011, PDF)
- Old School Fantasy #9: Hand of the Harbinger (2011, PDF)

=== Source books ===
- Powers & Perils: Orwell Industries (2006, softcover)
- Iron Dynasty Guidebook #1: Ikusa Kokoro (2011, PDF)
- Iron Dynasty Guidebook #2: Sorimizu (2011, PDF)
- Iron Dynasty Guidebook #3: Uma-Ko Ryoudo (2011, PDF)
- Runepunk Guidebook #1: GreyMesa (2011, PDF)

== Ronin Arts ==
=== Source book ===
- Starships! (2005)

== Savage Mojo ==
=== Settings ===
- Shaintar: Immortal Legends - Player's Guide (2005; softcover)
- Savage Suzerain (2009; hardcover)
- Savage Suzerain Player's Guide (2009; PDF)
- Suzerain - Dogs of Hades (2010; hardcover)
- Suzerain - Noir Knights (2010; hardcover)
- Suzerain - Shanghai Vampocalypse (2010; PDF)
- Suzerain - Caladon Falls (2010; PDF)

== Silver Gryphon Games ==
- Wellstone City (2010; PDF)
- Wellstone City Chronicles - Two Bit Thugs (2010; PDF)
- Wellstone City Chronicles - Burning Crosses(2010; PDF)
- Wellstone City Chronicles - A Death Undeserving (2010; PDF)
- Camp Wicakini (2010; PDF)
- Wellstone City (2010; softcover)
- The Pine Ridge Horror (2010; PDF)
- Zombacalypse (2010; PDF)
- Zombacalypse (2010; softcover)
- Wellstone City Chronicles - Schroedinger's Box (2011; PDF)
- Camp Wicakini - Part II (2011; PDF)
- Red Blizzard (2012; PDF)
- Wellstone City Chronicles - The Ranch Raid (2012; PDF)
- Wellstone City Chronicles - Two Bit Thugs (2012; PDF)
- Camp Wicakini 3: Wanagi Mato Lives! (2012; PDF)
- Wellstone City Chronicles - Breaking Murphy (2012; PDF)
- Wellstone City Chronicles - Wellstone City Encounter Deck (2011; PDF)

== Sneak Attack Press ==
- Broken Earth (2014; PDF and hardcover)

== 12 to Midnight, Inc. ==
=== Adventures ===
- Last Rites of the Black Guard (2003)
- Weekend Warriors (2004)
- Bloodlines (2004)
- Innana's Kiss (2004)
- Brainwashed (2005)
- Skinwalker (2006)
- Jerry's Midnight Tales (2006)
- Fire in the Hole (2006)
- The Beast Within (2007)
- Chickens in the Mist (2007)

=== Source books ===
- Green's Guide to Ghosts (2005)
- Fear Effects (2005)

== VampJac Productions ==
=== Setting ===
- Vampire Earth Sourcebook (2005; print-on-demand)

== WorldWorks ==
=== Adventures ===
- Something Below (2007)
- Dinas Fford: The Seeds of War (2007)
