= City o' Gloom =

Role-playing game supplement

- Box cover art by Tom Fowler
- Designers: Shane Hensley; John Goff; Hal Mangold
- Illustrators: Thomas J. Biondolillo; James A. Crabtree; Paul Daly; Kim DeMulder; Tom Fowler; Geoff Hassing; Ashe Marler; Allen Nunis; Andy Park; Jay Rozen; Loston Wallace
- Publishers: Pinnacle Entertainment Group
- Publication: 1998
- Genres: Western horror steampunk RPG

City o' Gloom is a supplement published by Pinnacle Entertainment Group in 1998 for the horror role-playing game Deadlands that describes Salt Lake City, called the "City o' Gloom" because of the endless fog emanating from the industrial zone.

== Description ==
City o' Gloom is a boxed set that contains the following:

- A 128-page softcover book, "The Guide to the City o' Gloom": After a brief introduction, the book is divided into three sections, all narrated by Six-Hundred-Pound Sally, an autocopter pilot working for Smith & Robards, a company of mad scientists and inventors.
  - "Posse Territory": Sally relates the history of Salt Lake City and its establishment as the capital city of the independent State of the Desert, ruled by the Mormon church and its fanatical secret police. The state of the present-day city is covered, with special focus on the church and its armed wing. Notable sites of the city are also detailed as well as the Junkyard industrial zone. Finally, the favorite two sports of the city are explained: Skullchucker (teams of five try to score goals with skulls); and the Pit (gladiatorial combat).
  - "No Man's Land": Some important artifacts of the city.
  - "Marshall's Handbook": Background information for the Marshall (gamemaster), including the city's true history and dark secrets, notable personalities and companies, and many non-player characters, both potential friends and potential enemies of the player characters.
- A 32-page B&W book, "A Short Treatise on the Augmentation of the Human Body": Explains how to upgrade player characters with cybernetic augmentations.
- Another 32-page booklet, "Thaumaturgical Diffusion": New spells.
- A large double-sided color map.
- A sheet of die-cut counters for use in Pit combats.
- a cardstock battlemap of the Pit.

== Publication history ==
In 1996, Pinnacle Entertainment Group published the innovative role-playing game Deadlands, which mixed the Western and horror genres and added a bit of steampunk. It was moderately successful — critic Eric Baker noted "Deadlands is the first role-playing game to ever make a success of a Wild West background" — and several supplements and adventures were subsequently published, including 1998's City o' Gloom, a boxed set designed by Shane Hensley, John Goff and Hal Mangold, with box cover art by Tom Fowler, and interior art by Thomas J. Biondolillo, James A. Crabtree, Paul Daly, Kim DeMulder, Geoff Hassing, Ashe Marler, Allen Nunis, Andy Park, Jay Rozen, and Loston Wallace.

== Reception ==
In Issue 11 of the French games magazine Backstab, Michaël Croitoriu commented, "With its cocktail of religion, science, tyranny, and secret war, City o' Gloom has everything it takes to become the Marshalls' favorite adventure setting. " Croitoriu concluded by giving this book a rating of 8 out of 10, saying, "Given the challenge that Salt Lake City presents, it is unlikely that the players will be able to resist its call for long.

In the December 1998 issue of Realms of Fantasy, Eric Baker bemoaned the lack of an index, writing, "Given all this information, a good index would have been a nice addition to the books, or at least a more detailed Table of Contents. Page references in the first section do at least direct GMs to the proper page in the back of the book, but then the back pages don't refer the GMs back to the proper front ones." Despite this, Baker concluded, "If you've been longing to add more machines and devices to your Deadlands game, then this is the supplement for you. If you've wanted to run adventures in Utah and you don't mind working to find the information you need, then you should also pick up City o' Gloom. If, however, you are new to Deadlands and are looking for a place to start, this isn't it."

In the French games magazine Casus Belli, Slawick Charlier noted that the material in the boxed set was "remarkably dense, packed with ideas and source material. There is certainly plenty to do in the city of the infamous Dr. Hellstrom!" Charlier concluded, "City o' Gloom is, without a doubt, the most successful geographical guide in the entire product line. However, Salt Lake City is a highly unique location, defined by the omnipresence of the wildest inventions imaginable. A conscientious gamemaster should only send their players there if they intend to emphasize this particular facet of the Deadlands universe."
