= Matt Forbeck =

American author and game designer

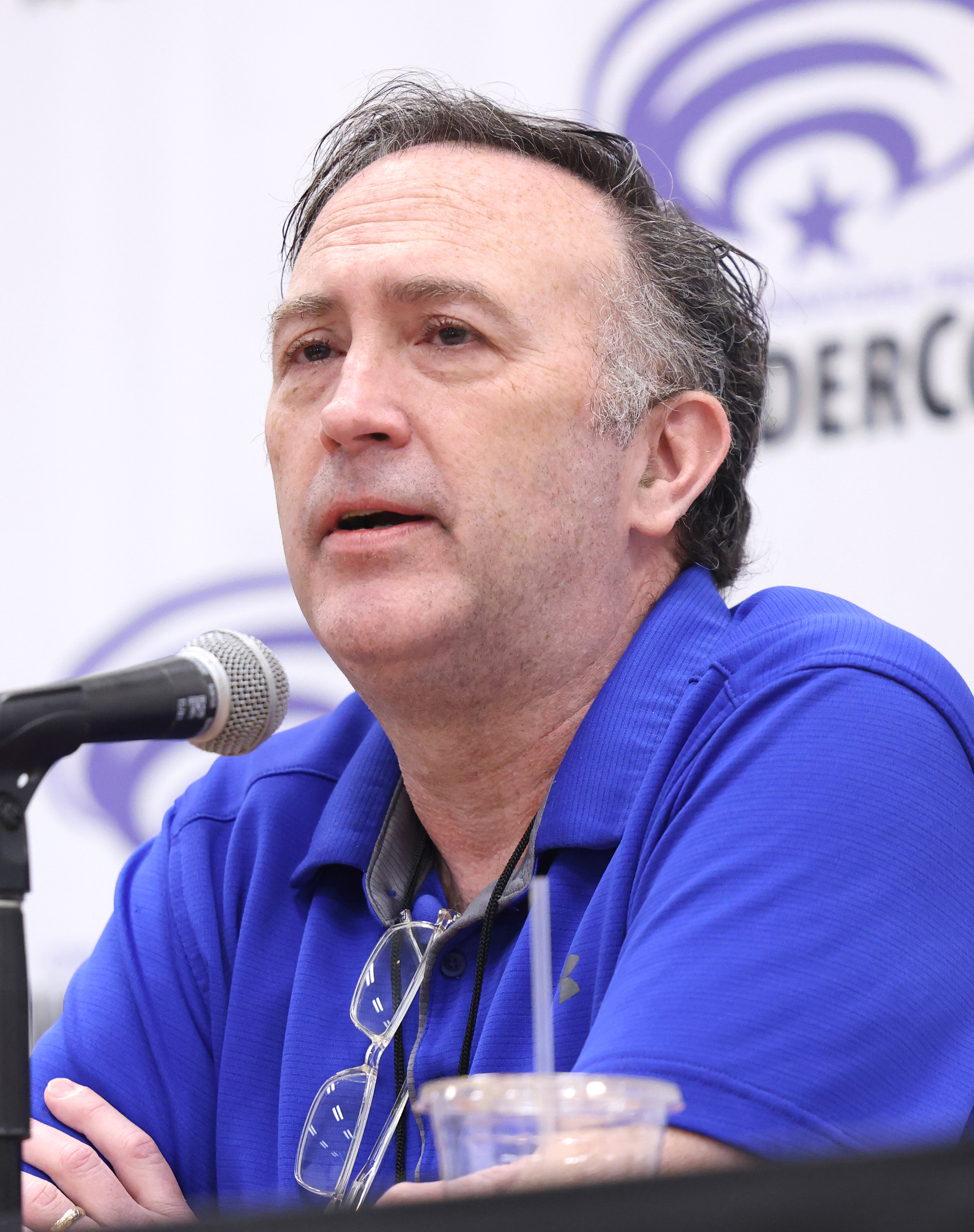
- Forbeck in 2025
- Education: University of Michigan
- Occupations: Author; game designer
- Spouse: Ann
- Children: 4
- Website: www.forbeck.com

Matt Forbeck is an American author and game designer from Beloit, Wisconsin.

== Biography ==
Forbeck first became interested in role-playing games at age 13 when he started playing Dungeons & Dragons. He earned a degree in creative writing from the Residential College at the University of Michigan and graduated in 1989. Forbeck began working full-time on games and fiction after graduating. He was the editor on an adventure by Gary Gygax for New Infinities called Epic of Yarth: Necropolis. He wrote Outlaw (1991) and Western Hero (1991) for the Iron Crown Enterprises and Hero Games. Forbeck and Shane Hensley formed Pinnacle Entertainment Group to publish Deadlands. Forbeck spent four years as the president of Pinnacle and was the director of the adventure games division at Human Head Studios for two years. Forbeck left Pinnacle to move to Alderac Entertainment Group (AEG) just before the two companies ended their relationship, and sold his Brave New World role-playing game to AEG. Forbeck has designed collectible card games, roleplaying games, miniatures games, and board games, and he has written short fiction, comic books, and novels for the companies Wizards of the Coast, Games Workshop, TSR, Decipher, White Wolf, Pinnacle, Green Ronin, AEG, Reaper Miniatures, Image Comics, WildStorm Productions, Idea + Design Works, and many others. Forbeck has also worked for Atari, Ubisoft, Mattel, Playmates Toys, and Human Head Studios. Along with game designer Jason Blair, he wrote the script for the video game Conduit 2.

Forbeck has won Origins Awards for Best Roleplaying Game for Deadlands and The Lord of the Rings Roleplaying Game, Best Miniatures Rules for Warzone and The Great Rail Wars, Best Roleplaying Adventure for Independence Day, Best Fantasy Board Game for Genestealer, and Best Short Story for "Prometheus Unwound" from The Book of All Flesh. He is the author of the well-received Secret of the Spiritkeeper, the first book in the Knights of the Silver Dragon series.

Forbeck and his wife Ann live in Beloit, Wisconsin, and have four children.

== Bibliography ==
=== Role-playing games ===
- Mutant Chronicles (1993)
- Deadlands (1996), contributor
- Brave New World (1999)
- Tales from the Loop (2017), additional writing
- Marvel Multiverse Role-Playing Game (2022)

=== Collectible card games ===
- WildStorms: The Expandable Super-Hero Card Game (1995)
- Fastbreak (1996) – a now-out-of-print collectible card game (CCG) by WildStorm based on professional basketball. It was first released in August 1996 and was designed by Matt Forbeck. The original set had 303 cards plus 2 promo cards, though one source claims there are 8 promo cards. The art was cartoony with a humor theme and was described as having a "consistent theme" with its "best traits [being] its humor and the realism". Matt Forbeck is featured on a card, and, as one of the designers, put significant effort into designing and playing the game.

Gameplay involves players taking on the role of coaches to guide their basketball players to victory. Two rows of five-man teams are lined up and a basketball token is passed between the player cards using Dribble cards. The ball moves up columns and across rows on a 5×5 grid. Counter play is initiated through Foul cards that can steal or shoot the ball that is being dribbled via Grab cards. Passes are resisted with Steals and Shoot cards resisted with Blocks. Wild cards allow effects outside of moving the ball.

=== Fiction ===
==== Blood Bowl series ====
1. Blood Bowl (2005)
2. Dead Ball (2005)
3. Death Match (2006)
4. Rumble in the Jungle (2007)

- The Blood Bowl Omnibus (2007) collects #1-3

==== Guild Wars series ====
- Ghosts of Ascalon (2010) with Jeff Grubb

==== Knights of the Silver Dragon series ====
- Secret of the Spiritkeeper (2004)
- Prophecy of the Dragons (2006)
- The Dragons Revealed (2006)
- Knights of the Silver Dragon (2008) omnibus of all three novels, with Ree Soesbee, Dale Donovan and Linda Johns

==== Eberron series ====
- The Lost Mark:
1. Marked for Death (2005)
2. The Road to Death (2006)
3. The Queen of Death (2006)

==== Endless Quest series ====
- Escape the Underdark (2018)
- Big Trouble (2018)
- Into the Jungle (2018)
- To Catch a Thief (2018)
- Escape from Castle Ravenloft (2019)
- The Mad Mage's Academy (2019)

==== Magic: The Gathering comics ====
- Magic: The Gathering #1–4, with artist Martin Coccolo (2011–12)
  - Magic: The Gathering Volume 1 (tpb, 2012, IDW Publishing, ISBN 9781613772287)
- Magic: The Gathering: The Spell Thief #1–4, with artists Christian Duce, Martin Coccolo (2012)
  - Magic: The Gathering Volume 2: The Spell Thief (tpb, 2012, IDW Publishing, ISBN 9781613774144)
- Magic: The Gathering: Path of Vengeance #1–4, with artists Jack Jadson, Martin Coccolo (2012–13)
  - Magic: The Gathering Volume 3: Path of Vengeance (tpb, 2013, IDW Publishing, ISBN 9781613776377)

==== Novels ====
- Mutant Chronicles (2008)
- Amortals (2010)
- Vegas Knights (2011)
- Carpathia (2012)
- Leverage: The Con Job (2012)
- Halo: New Blood (2015)
- Halo: Legacy of Onyx (2017)
- Halo: Bad Blood (2018)
- Minecraft Dungeons: The Rise of the Arch-Illager (2020)

=== Nonfiction ===
- Star Wars vs. Star Trek: Could the Empire Kick the Federation's Ass? And Other Galaxy-Shaking Enigmas (2011)

=== Collections ===
- Crocodilopolis (1992)
- Space Station Boomtown 13 (1994)
- Interesting Times (1994)
- Musings (1995)
- Reconciliation (1995)
- Talking Heads (1999)
- Reborn on the Bayou (1999)
- Head Games (1999)
- Prometheus Unwound (2001)
- Coming Home (2005)
- In the Belly of the Behemoth (2011)
- The Fury Pact (2012)

=== Essays ===
- "Author's Introduction" in The Blood Bowl Omnibus (2007)
