= Savage Mojo =

Publisher of role-playing games

Savage Mojo is a publisher of role-playing games and supplier of game-development resources to other studios.

== History ==
In 2007 Miles M Kantir joined Aaron Acevedo in creating Talisman Studios.

In their first year, Talisman Studios published the Shaintar: Immortal Legends line of products for Sean Patrick Fannon, turning his manuscripts into finished books and maps.

Miles M Kantir, the creator of the Origins Award-nominated Suzerain universe, oversaw the development of a second edition under the Talisman Studios banner, initially (2007–2009) using "Mojo Rules!". Later, after receiving an official license from Pinnacle Entertainment Group, the Savage Worlds rules system (2010–present) would be adopted. During this time the Suzerain universe would expand to include a multitude of titles such as Shanghai Vampocalypse, and Noir Knights.

In 2011, Talisman Studios was rebranded as Savage Mojo.

In 2013, Savage Mojo ran a successful Kickstarter campaign for Sean Patrick Fannon's Evil Beagle Games to create a new edition of Shaintar.

In 2015 Savage Mojo and Evil Beagle Games agreed to a transfer. Savage Mojo would take ownership of Shaintar, and in return fulfill all obligations to create the 42 books promised during the Kickstarter. This includes the ENnie award-winning setting, Shaintar: Legends Unleashed. Additionally, during this time the Suzerain universe continued development, expanding into the Pathfinder Roleplaying Game rules system.

In 2018 Savage Mojo developed and released the newest core primer for the Suzerain universe: Suzerain Legends. The next year they released seven JumpStart adventures and matching packs of pre-generated characters to be used in conjunction with that primer.
