= Hucksters & Hexes =

Hucksters & Hexes is a 1998 role-playing game supplement published by Pinnacle Entertainment Group for Deadlands.

== Contents ==
Hucksters & Hexes is a supplement in which the lore, powers, dangers, and secret workings of huckster magic are revealed—complete with new rules, dozens of hexes, character options, and a full Marshal‑ready adventure.

== Reviews ==
- Świat Gier Komputerowych (Oct 2001)
- Backstab #10
- Backstab #11 (as "Le livre de Hucksters")
- Casus Belli #114
