= List of Deadlands: Hell on Earth publications =

This is a list of the publications released for the Deadlands: Hell on Earth roleplaying game, which is a continuation of Deadlands: The Weird West, both of which were published by Pinnacle Entertainment Group. Hell on Earth was originally published using the same custom rules as The Weird West, and has since been republished as Hell on Earth Reloaded, using the Savage Worlds rules.

== Core rulebooks and expansions ==
Title	Description	Year
Hell on Earth	Core rulebook; moved the setting a few centuries into the future from the original Deadlands	1998
Wasted West	Expansion of the core rules and additional setting detail	1998

== Locations ==
Title	Description	Year
Shattered Coast	Maps and information on The Great Maze, updated for the Hell on Earth setting	1999
Iron Oasis	Rules and information for Junkyard, the largest free city in the Wasted West, as well as rules for aerial combat	1999
Denver	Rules and information for setting adventures in Denver, including details of new villains The Combine and rules for powered armour	2001
City O' Sin	Rules and information for setting adventures in Las Vegas, as well as an adventure	2001

== Character classes ==
Title	Description	Year
Brainburners	Expanded rules for playing Sykers	1998
The Last Crusaders	Expanded rules for playing Templars	1998
Children o' the Atom	Expanded rules for playing Doomsayers	1998
Cyborgs	Expanded rules for playing Cyborgs	1999
The Junkman Cometh	Expanded rules for playing Junkers	1999
Waste Warriors	Expanded rules for playing Warriors, including new rules for martial arts	2000
Spirit Warriors	Expanded rules for playing Toxic Shamans, including updated histories for many Native American tribes	2000

== Adventures ==
Title	Description	Year
Hell or High Water	The posse must defend the people of Baton Rouge against first a band of pirates and then a terrible horror from the depths of the bayou	1998
Something About a Sword	The posse must battle mutants and rad-priests in a race to find a legendary Templar sword lost somewhere in Wyoming	1999
Urban Renewal	The posse are tasked with clearing squatters and mutants from an abandoned building in Junkyard, though all is not what it initially appears	2000
The Boise Horror	The posse find themselves involved in the politics of the Templars, at their headquarters in Boise.	2000
The Unity	The conclusion of the primary Hell on Earth storyline. This adventure involves a ghost ship named Unity, the secret of the sand worms, a new appearance of Dr Hellstromme and a glimpse of the planet Banshee, the setting of the third gameplay setting, Deadlands: Lost Colony.	2002

== Dime Novels ==
As with Deadlands: The Weird West, these Dime Novels contained a work of short fiction followed by rules for implementing elements from it into an existing game.

Title	Description	Year
Leftovers	Dime Novel #1, Teller and his companions try to make peace between some townies and mutants. Leftovers won the Origins Awards for Best Game-Related Short Work of 1998.	1998
Killer Clowns	Wasteland wanderer Teller and his companions battle through an abandoned amusement part in order to rescue a set of hostages from a road gang	1999
Infestations	A second adventure starring Teller	1999

== Miscellaneous ==
Title	Description	Year
Road Warriors	Expanded rules for vehicle combat as well as detail on various vehicle based organisations such as The Convoy and wheel gangs	1998
Toxic Tales	Notebook for players to keep notes on their adventures, as well as a set of expanded character sheets	1998
Radiation Screen	Package containing a GM screen and the adventure Apocalypse Now, in which the posse must locate a ghost rock powered nuclear weapon	1998
Monsters, Muties 'n' Misfits	A catalogue of monsters and antagonists for use in Wasted West adventures	1999

== Cardstock Cowboys ==
Cardstock Cowboys were a line of 3D stand-up figures that could be used for miniature-based combat in Deadlands games, available in a series of themed packs.

Title	Description	Year
Starter Pack	A basic set of standups matching the starting archetypes and common enemies of the main game	
Horrors of the Wasted West	Standups of all monsters from Monsters, Muties 'n' Misfits	
Road Wars!	Vehicle standups for use with the Road Warrior expansion	
The Combine	Standups of the various forces of The Combine, as introduced in the Denver expansion	

== Deadlands: Hell on Earth d20 ==
Title	Description	Publication year
Hell on Earth d20	adaptation of the original Hell on Earth setting core rulebook for the d20 System ruleset. Requires d20 SRD or Dungeons & Dragons 3rd Edition for complete rules.	2002
Horrors of the Wasted West	Catalogue of monsters and antagonists.	2002

== Deadlands: Hell on Earth Reloaded ==
Title	Description	Publication year
Hell on Earth Reloaded	Core rulebook, containing the complete Savage Worlds ruleset for the Hell on Earth setting. Requires the core Savage Worlds book to play.	2012
Hell on Earth Players Guide	Contains the portions of the core rulebook aimed solely at players, with none of the gamemaster information. Designed as a cheaper product so that players only purchase the information they need.	2012
Hell on Earth Companion	Contains expanded setting rules for players and game masters, including rules for playing cyborgs, librarians and witches. It also contains an adventure generator and rules for creating survivor settlements.	2014
The Worms' Turn	A full-length plot campaign for Hell on Earth that takes place after the events of The Unity adventure (which was a Deadlands Classic adventure listed above).	2014
