= Law Dogs =

Law Dogs is a 1998 role-playing game supplement published by Pinnacle Entertainment Group for Deadlands.

== Contents ==
Law Dogs is a supplement in which law enforcement characters are detailed.

== Reviews ==
- Backstab #11
- Black Gate
