= Doomsayer =

Doomsayer may refer to:

- A doomer or peaknik (believer in drastic consequences from the peak oil theory)
- A character class in Deadlands: Hell on Earth
- A person or doomsday cult claiming a doomsday prediction
- A prophet, oracle, or seer who reveals the fate of someone or something
- Any person who makes pessimistic predictions
