= Weird War II: Blood on the Rhine =

Weird War II: Blood on the Rhine is a 2001 role-playing game supplement published by Pinnacle Entertainment Group for Weird Wars.

== Contents ==
Weird War II: Blood on the Rhine is a supplement in which World War II soldiers and fighters in the resistance deal with supernatural creatures.

== Reviews ==
- Pyramid
- Backstab
- Fictional Reality (Issue 9 - Sep 2002)
- Legions Realm Monthly (Issue 8 - Apr 2003)
- Gaming Frontiers (Volume 1 - 2002)
