= Dark Seed =

Dark Seed or Darkseed may refer to:

- Dark Seed (video game), a 1992 horror adventure game
  - Dark Seed II, a 1995 sequel to the 1992 adventure game
- Darkseed (band), a German gothic metal band formed in 1992
- Dark Seed, an Australian indigenous music group managed by Vibe Australia
- Dark Seed, a DeBeers story by V. C. Andrews
- The Dark Seed, a book based on the role-playing game Savage Worlds

== See also ==
- Darkseid, a fictional character in DC Comics
