= Back East: The North =

Back East: The North is a 1999 role-playing game supplement published by Pinnacle Entertainment Group for Deadlands.

== Contents ==
Back East: The North is a supplement in which player characters explore the historic, perilous cities of the Union—Washington, New York, Philadelphia, and Boston—where they must outwit lawmen, conspiracies, and urban dangers while gaining new abilities and maneuvers.

== Reviews ==
- Pyramid
- Casus Belli #122
- RPGNow Downloader Monthly (Issue 4 - Mar 2003)
