= Deadlands: The Great Rail Wars =

Board game designed by Shane Lacy Hensley

Deadlands: The Great Rail Wars is a board game published by Pinnacle Entertainment Group in 1997.

== Gameplay ==
Deadlands: The Great Rail Wars is a horror Western board game based on the Deadlands role-playing game.

== Reception ==
- At the 1998 Origins Awards, Deadlands: The Great Rail Wars won the award for Best Science Fiction or Fantasy Miniatures Rules of 1997.

== Reviews ==
- Backstab #5
- Pyramid
