= Land of the Rising Dead =

2002 role-playing game supplement

Land of the Rising Dead is a 2002 role-playing game supplement published by Pinnacle Entertainment Group for Weird Wars.

== Contents ==
Land of the Rising Dead is a supplement in which players are presented with new classes, feats, naval rules, and equipment as they battle both Imperial forces in the Pacific‑theatre and the monstrous horrors infesting islands from Midway to Iwo Jima.

== Reviews ==
- Pyramid
- Fictional Reality (Issue 10 - Dec 2002)
- Legions Realm Monthly (Issue 10 - Jun 2003)
