= Loston Wallace =

American comics artist

- Born: 1970 (age 55–56) Clintwood, Virginia
- Area: Artist

Loston Wallace (born 1970) is an American freelance comic book artist and comics-licensing illustrator.

== Biography ==
Wallace attended The Kubert School from 1994-1996. In 1996, Wallace married Carolyn Waterson, who had also attended the Kubert School.

Wallace began his freelance art career in 1996, providing interior illustration for role-playing games such as Pinnacle Entertainment's Deadlands RPG and FASA Corporation's Battletech and Mechwarrior games. He worked as a freelance illustrator for roleplaying games for five years, working on games like Shadowrun, West End's Star Wars and Indiana Jones, and GURPS Old West.

In 1998, Wallace began freelancing for DC Comics' licensing department, illustrating Batman Animated and Superman Animated children's books, based on the television animated series. In 2001 Loston penciled Klyde & Meriem, a 40-page Cavewoman one-shot comic for Basement Comics that was written by James Robert Smith and inked by Kim DeMulder.

In 2002, Wallace was invited by Jim Keefe to guest pencil a Sunday strip for King Features' comic strip Flash Gordon. This strip followed the last Al Williamson Flash Gordon strip. Loston then penciled several stories in the Elvira, Mistress of the Dark comic book series, working on stories written by Richard Howell and Janet Hetherington. Loston's pencils matched up with veteran comic inkers like Bob Wiacek and Bob McLeod.

Wallace continued to produce licensing artwork with DC Comics, working on such books as Batman: Deep Freeze, Superman: Stop the Presses!, and contributing artwork to the Catwoman retrospective, Catwoman: The Life & Times of a Feline Fatale. In 2005 he illustrated the storybook Superman Returns: Thank You, Superman!, an official Superman Returns movie tie-in book produced by DC Comics and Meredith Books. He also contributed pencils to two Krypto the Super Dog books based on the popular Cartoon Network television series.

Meredith Books hired Wallace to illustrate the official Spider-Man 3 Sound Book in 2006, which was a tie-in storybook/toy product based on the Spider-Man 3 feature film. Andrew Park provided colors on this particular project.

In 2007 Wallace illustrated a Step Into Reading book for DC Comics and Golden Books called DC Super Friends: Flying High (to be released in 2008). Wallace again teamed up with colorist Andrew Park to illustrate another storybook for DC Comics and Meredith books called Batman: Race Against Crime. This book was published alongside the release of the highly anticipated The Dark Knight film.

Currently, Wallace is illustrating a comic called Lorna, Relic Wrangler, a one-shot comic book written by Micah Harris that is to be published by Image Comics.

Wallace has been a featured guest at the Gen Con, Dragon Con, and Heroes Convention gaming and comics conventions.

== Bibliography ==
=== Licensing work ===
DC Comics

- Golden Books
  - Super Friends: Flying High (Step Into Reading)
- Meredith Books
  - Batman: Race Against Crime (children's storybook)
  - Superman Returns: Thank You, Superman! (official movie tie-in book)
- Landoll children's story & activity books
  - Batman: Deep Freeze
  - Batman: Guardian Of Justice
  - Batman: Crime Solver
  - Batman: The Dark Knight
  - Superman: Stop The Presses!
  - Superman: On The Loose
  - Superman 400-Page Special
  - DC Ultimate Color/Activity Book
- Chronicle Books
  - Catwoman: Life and Times of a Feline Fatale (character retrospective book)
- Scholastic Corporation children's story & activity books
  - Krypto the Super Dog: Test Pilot Puppy
  - Krypto the Super Dog: Dog Star on Patrol

Marvel Entertainment

- Meredith Books
  - Spider-Man 3 Sound Book (official movie tie-in book)

=== Comic books ===
- Klyde & Meriem (one-shot, Basement Comics)
- Elvira, Mistress of the Dark (Claypool Comics)
- Lorna, Relic Wrangler (Image Comics)

=== Comic strips ===
- Flash Gordon Sunday newspaper comic strip (King Features, 2002)

=== Role-playing games ===
Eden Studios

- ALL FLESH MUST BE EATEN: FIST FULL O' ZOMBIES (supplement)

FASA Corporation

- Battletech
  - EXPLORER CORPS (supplement)
  - FREE WORLDS LEAGUE (supplement)
  - SHATTERED SPHERE (supplement)
  - THE DRAGON ROARS (supplement)
  - FIELD MANUAL: LYRAN ALLIANCE (supplement)
  - FIELD MANUAL: COMSTAR (supplement)
  - FIELD MANUAL: FEDERATED SUNS (supplement)
  - FIELD MANUAL: CAPALLAN CONFEDERATION (supplement)
- CRUCIBLE: PRINCIPATE FACTIONS BOOK (supplement)
- Mechwarrior
  - RPG (3rd Edition) (rule book) (supplement)
  - GUIDE TO SOLARIS (supplement)
  - NORTHWIND HIGHLANDERS (supplement)
- SHADOWRUN: RIGGER 2 SOURCEBOOK (supplement)

Iron Crown Entertainment

- ROLEMASTER: CHANGLING COMPANION (supplement)

Pinnacle Entertainment

- Deadlands
  - THE WEIRD WEST RPG (rule book)
  - THE WEIRD WEST RPG (2nd edition) (rulebook)
  - MARSHAL'S SCREENS (Gamemaster's screens & adventure book)
  - THE QUICK & THE DEAD (supplement)
  - DIMESTORE NOVEL: PERDITION'S DAUGHTER (adventure book)
  - BOOK O' THE DEAD (supplement)
  - SMITH & ROBARDS (supplement)
  - HUCKSTERS & HEXES (supplement)
  - RASCALS, VARMITS & CRITTERS (supplement)
  - GHOST DANCERS (supplement)
  - FIRE & BRIMSTONE (supplement)
  - FIST FULL O' GHOSTROCK (supplement)
  - LAWDOGS (supplement)
  - THE GREAT MAZE BOX SET
  - RIVER O' BLOOD BOX SET
  - CITY O' GLOOM (supplement)
  - TWISTED TALES (supplement)
  - THE GREAT RAIL WARS (miniature strategy game)
  - THE POKER DECK (novelty)
  - LOST ANGELS (supplement)
  - HELL ON EARTH RPG (rule book)
  - HELL ON EARTH RADIATIONS SCREENS (Gamemaster's screens & adventure book)
  - HELL ON EARTH WASTED WEST (supplement)
  - HELL ON EARTH ROAD TO HELL (supplement)
  - HELL ON EARTH HELL & HIGH WATER (supplement)
  - HELL ON EARTH BRAINBURNERS (supplement)

West End Games

- INDIANA JONES & THE SKY PIRATES (supplement)
- STAR WARS: INSTANT ADVENTURES (supplement)

=== Illustrations ===
- Weird New Jersey magazine
- Weird US Barnes & Noble book series:
  - Weird New Jersey
  - Weird U.S.
  - Weird Texas
  - Weird Florida
  - Weird Maryland
- Illustration of the Jersey Devil in an episode of the History Channel's Weird U.S. television show.
