= Deadlands: Hell on Earth =

Horror roleplaying game published in 1998

- Deadlands: Hell on Earth cover
- Designers: Shane Lacy Hensley
- Publishers: Pinnacle Entertainment Group
- Publication: 1998
- Genres: Alternate history, post-apocalyptic, horror, Western, magitech
- Systems: Custom

Deadlands: Hell on Earth (or "Deadlands: The Wasted West") is a genre-mixing alternate history roleplaying game which combines the post-apocalyptic and horror genres. Western tropes and magitech elements are also prominent. It was written by Shane Lacy Hensley and originally published by Pinnacle Entertainment Group. As part of the original marketing campaign in August 1998, the game had a green leatherbound hardcover edition run, limited to about 750 copies.

== Plot ==
As the name implies, Deadlands: Hell on Earth is set in the same exact place as the original Deadlands roleplaying game. Specifically, it is set in a post-apocalyptic future of the original "Weird West" setting of Deadlands, also known as the "Wasted West."

Through a series of machinations, the Reckoners from the original Deadlands setting contrive to spark a nuclear war between the United States and the still-existent Confederate States, in which the weapons are not only powered by nuclear fission and nuclear fusion, but are also powered by a supernatural element known as "Ghost Rock." The combination of multi-megaton explosives, radiation, and supernatural devastation serves to turn large portions of the United States into hellish wastelands filled with radiation and deadly supernatural monsters.

The formation of these large "deadlands" allows the Reckoners to enter the realm of Earth, where they are revealed to be the Four Horsemen of the Apocalypse. They ravage across the globe, destroying civilization and turning most of the Earth into a wasted landscape of nightmares and death. Then they mysteriously vanish.

Thirteen years have passed since the Reckoners appeared, and civilization is once more attempting to assert itself in small, isolated pockets. Players take on the roles of characters struggling to survive the nightmarish wasteland that the Reckoners left behind. A variety of mundane and arcane archetypes are available, including "Sykers" (characters with deadly psychic powers), "Doomsayers" (magical priests of radiation), "Templars" (members of a martial organization patterned after the Knights Templar), "Junkers" (humans with the supernatural ability to create working devices from the scavenged debris of pre-apocalypse civilization), and even just plain-old everyday humans, surviving by their wits and their gun.

== Character types ==
In addition to a variety of mundane survivors, would-be law men, ex-road gangers, and general do-gooders that exist in Hell on Earth, there are a number of magically-attuned characters that are playable.

- Anti-Templar: Anti-Templars have defected from the Templars due to clashing views over the worth of human life. They believe that all people are deserving of help and do not discriminate or test people like the Templars do. The two groups share a similar list of powers, but Anti-Templars have a few tricks of their own. Anti-Templars are detailed in the Last Crusaders sourcebook.
- Cyborgs: Before the Last War, scientists could not get human Cyborgs to work well due to an inability to perfectly mimic all of the vital organs that people have. Instead, they turned their efforts to making Cyborgs from Harrowed. In addition to cybernetic enhancements and the general abilities that all Harrowed have, some (usually those who were Harrowed before the Cyborg conversion) have access to Harrowed powers. Cyborgs (as well as Harrowed) are detailed in the Cyborgs sourcebook.
- Doomsayers: Doomsayers are magically gifted people who gain power through worship of "The Atom." They believe that mutation is the next step for humanity, and that they are the priests of this new way of life. The original group of Doomsayers, called the Cult of Doom, are now a villain group who try to speed up evolution by killing humans. They are sometimes referred to as "Green Robes" due to the robes they wear. The Schismatic Doomsayers, who don purple robes, believe that their gifts need to be spread to help the humans. While they still believe that mutation is a sign of the gifted and the way of the future, they do not outright attack humans and are largely seen as good and heroic. With some of the most devastating powers in the game, Doomsayers are one of the more potent arcane backgrounds. Doomsayers are detailed in the Children o' the Atom sourcebook.
- Junker: Sort of an evolved form of Mad Science and Huckster magic (in particular, the Thaumaturgical Diffusionists, or Metal Mages, whose magic focused on item construction and more scientific theories), Junkers construct amazing devices using scavenged parts and magic rituals. Their powers come from "Tech Spirits"—spirits of Pre-War technological objects that now reside in a part of the Hunting Grounds. The rules for item creation are far more complex than those of the Mad Scientists, but allow for great variety and uniqueness. Junkers are detailed in The Junkman Cometh sourcebook.
- Librarians: Magically, Librarians are an evolution of a mundane character concept introduced earlier in the game. The group spreads across America, searching for and preserving knowledge in order to prevent its ultimate loss. As an arcane background, Librarians gain powers based around literature, such being able to emulate traits of famous literary characters. Librarians are detailed as mundane collector/heroes in The Wasted West sourcebook and as an arcane background in the Shattered Coast sourcebook.
- Martial Artist: Martial Artists are very similar to those from the Weird West. In addition to receiving some rule updates, Sykers are allowed to use Martial Arts powers, as their training was developed from Martial Arts training. Martial Artists are detailed in the Waste Warriors sourcebook.
- Power Armor Pilot: Power armor jocks pilot super advanced power armor. Like Iron Man but tougher. HI, US and CS models. Incredible firepower but short operational times due to batteries.
- Syker: Sykers, who use powerful psychic abilities, were usually trained for military combat and espionage. While most saw action on Banshee (the location for Deadlands: Lost Colony), many others were stationed on Earth to fight human threats during the Last War. A third group of Sykers called "Greenies" have discovered their powers since the end of the Last War. While less experienced than Banshee or Earth Sykers, Greenies have the ability to overcharge their powers to make them more potent, at the cost of additional strain and risk. Sykers are detailed in the Brainburners sourcebook.
- Templar: The Templars were formed to help those in need. However, because the founder of the Templars felt that people need to be willing to help themselves and aid in their fight, he decreed that each Templar must only help those that he deems worthy. The Templars gain magical powers from "the Saints", great people from the past who lend their strength to those of worth. In addition to Templars, some other heroic characters can use some of the powers Templars get, although not nearly on the same level. Templars are detailed in the Last Crusaders sourcebook.
- Toxic Shaman: When the Ghost Rock Bombs were dropped, and the world transformed into a toxic wasteland, many of the nature spirits were affected by the mystical corruption. As a result, spirits of pollution and insects suited for this toxic world gained greater power, and the spirits of pure nature were severely weakened. Toxic Shamans channel the mystical energies of these "Toxic Spirits" in the same way their predecessors, the Shamans, channeled the power of the nature spirits. Toxic Shamans are detailed in the Spirit Warriors sourcebook.
- Witch: Witches are similar to Hucksters in practice. Witches use an old cookbook (titled "How to Serve your Man") with encrypted spells in it. They have a limited selection of powers and are minor arcane characters in Hell on Earth. Witches are detailed in the Wasted West sourcebook.

In addition to the new arcane backgrounds found in Hell on Earth, many of the arcane backgrounds from Deadlands still exist. These include Shamans, Hucksters, Voodooists, and Blessed, and are detailed in their respective Deadlands: Weird West sourcebooks.

== Current status ==
Although Deadlands has officially ended as its own product line, Pinnacle Entertainment Group has re-released all of the "Classic" Deadlands line in print and in an electronic version.

Deadlands: The Weird West saw an update in 2006 as Deadlands: Reloaded. The Reloaded line updates the setting and brings the rules in line with Pinnacle's current flagship product, Savage Worlds. Hell on Earth: Reloaded was released digitally in July, 2012, with a print version to follow later in the year.

== Reception ==
The reviewer from the online second volume of Pyramid stated that "Deadlands: Hell on Earth continues the trend that the original Deadlands game began, taking the Weird West more than 200 years into the future for a kind of "Weird West meets the Road Warrior" setting with all the fun and weirdness of the original, and then some. There are themes of fighting against evil, rebuilding civilization and man's inhumanity to man but mostly it's a fun game outlaw heroes with cool new guns and abilities fighting mutants and other nasty critters."

Game historian Shannon Appelcline, in his book Designers & Dragons: The 90s, noted that "Hell on Earth was the first game to show the cracks in Pinnacle's original Deadlands system. Where the bullet-by-bullet combat of Deadlands had been evocative and fast-paced for a game with six-shooters, it began to bog down with the fully automatic weaponry of the Hell on Earth era."

== Other reviews and commentary ==
- Shadis #52 (Oct., 1998)
- Casus Belli #116
- Backstab #11
- The Comics Buyer's Guide

== Rulebooks ==
See List of Deadlands: Hell on Earth publications
