= The Great Weird North =

Role-playing game supplement

The Great Weird North is a 2002 role-playing game supplement published by Pinnacle Entertainment Group for Deadlands.

== Contents ==
The Great Weird North is a supplement in which a regional sourcebook covers Canada and Alaska, detailing their harsh environments, and local legends such as flesh‑eating mice and the wendigo.

== Reviews ==
- Pyramid
- Pyramid
- Fictional Reality #11
