= Afrika Korpse =

Afrika Korpse is a 2002 role-playing game supplement published by Pinnacle Entertainment Group for Weird War II.

== Contents ==
Afrika Korpse is a supplement in which player characters are involved in a supernatural‑tainted North African campaign filled with new rules, horrors, factions, and eerie desert mysteries lurking alongside Rommel's forces.

== Reviews ==
- Pyramid
- Fictional Reality #11
