= Back East: The South =

Back East: The South is a 1999 role-playing game supplement published by Pinnacle Entertainment Group for Deadlands.

== Contents ==
Back East: The South is a supplement in which player characters explore the haunted swamps, hollers, and cities of the Confederacy—offering new dangers, lore, and abilities as they confront supernatural threats and Southern intrigue.

== Reviews ==
- Pyramid
- Casus Belli #122
- RPGNow Downloader Monthly (Issue 4 - Mar 2003)
