= Outlaw (Rolemaster) =

Outlaw is a 1991 role-playing supplement for Rolemaster published by Iron Crown Enterprises.

== Contents ==
Outlaw is a supplement in which a campaign setting is provided with character generation rules as well as combat information.

== Publication history ==
Shannon Appelcline noted that Western Hero by Matt Forbeck "was a near copy of the Rolemaster genre book Outlaw (1991). By this time ICE was no longer publishing the dual-statted Campaign Classics but they still made this final attempt to share resources between the two games."

== Reception ==
Herb Petro reviewed Outlaw in White Wolf #31 (May/June, 1992), rating it a 3 out of 5 and stated that "The well-written GM's section outlines a western town, six mini-scenarios, a lengthy introductory scenario, and ten scenario ideas. The Appendix has miniatures usage suggestions, Boot Hill and Western Hero system conversions, a Western-oriented bibliography and filmography, some maps, and a couple of attack tables. Overall, I could have run as successful a RoleMaster/SpaceMaster-based Western campaign without this product, but it does save some of the work."
