= The Quick & The Dead =

Role-playing game supplement

- Publisher: Pinnacle Entertainment Group
- Publication date: 1997
- ISBN: 978-1889546025

The Quick & The Dead is a 1997 role-playing game supplement published by Pinnacle Entertainment Group for Deadlands.

== Contents ==
The Quick & The Dead is a supplement in which expanded rules, new character options like the Kid and the Gambler, and magical relics rooted in Western lore are offered. Its centerpiece is a detailed 50-page setting guide, narrated by a fictional journalist from the Tombstone Epitaph. It provides a view of the Weird West, zooming in on Dodge City, Tombstone, and Deadwood, and offering scenario hooks. The setting is laced with postmodern references—like ghost stone-powered super-science in Roswell and a paranormal-investigating Pinkerton Agency led by a mysterious figure known only as "The Ghost." The book distinguishes between public lore and secret referee-only information.

== Reception ==
Andrew Rilstone reviewed The Quick & The Dead for Arcane magazine, rating it an 8 out of 10 overall, and stated that "Okay, all this information should have been included in the rulebook to begin with, but no-one who likes the idea of the Weird West should begrudge having to buy two books to get started when the standard is this high. Quite the best background for an RPG since Castle Falkenstein, I'd say."

== Reviews ==
- Backstab #5
- Shadis #36 (1997)
- Casus Belli #106
