= Smith & Robards =

- Publisher: Pinnacle Entertainment Group
- Publication date: 1997

Smith & Robards is a 1997 role-playing game supplement published by Pinnacle Entertainment Group for Deadlands.

== Contents ==
Smith & Robards is a supplement about mad scientists and the devices they build.

== Reviews ==
- InQuest Gamer #34
- Backstab #8
- Casus Belli #113
- Casus Belli #118
