= Tour of Darkness =

Tabletop role-playing game supplement

- Publishers: Pinnacle Entertainment Group
- Publication: 2004; 22 years ago
- Genres: Vietnam War
- Systems: Weird Wars

Tour of Darkness is a 2004 role-playing game supplement published by Pinnacle Entertainment Group for Weird Wars.

== Contents ==
Tour of Darkness is a supplement in which the Vietnam era is presented as a sanity‑shattering, combat‑heavy campaign sourcebook, covering both French and American periods while adding new rules, gear, mission generators, and a full plot‑point campaign.

== Reviews ==
- Pyramid
- Backstab #49
