= Suzerain Legends =

Tabletop role-playing game supplement

- Designers: MMK
- Publishers: Savage Mojo
- Publication: 2018
- Genres: Universal, pulp, western, fantasy, science fiction, horror, post-apocalyptic, cyberpunk, mythical, supernatural
- Systems: Savage Worlds

Suzerain Legends is the latest installment in the Suzerain universe, a tabletop RPG setting created by Savage Mojo (an official Savage Worlds licensee).

Previous entries in the Suzerain universe include a 2010 ENnie Award nominee and a 2007 Origins Award nominee.

== Setting ==
Suzerain is a meta-setting for Savage Worlds. That means heroes can battle the gods of the Egyptian pantheon one day, and drive "Mad Max" style through an apocalyptic wasteland the next. As a result of the near limitless realms (and utilization of the Savage Worlds rules system), Suzerain allows players to jump between sci-fi and high fantasy, for instance, while still maintaining the thematic feel of being in the same universe. Some of the realms a hero might visit include:

- Gatherall: A cyberpunk city ruled by the tyranny of a corrupted church.
- Wilderlands: The post-apocalyptic wastes filled with the most desperate survivors of the Pulse War.
- Untamed Empires: Where sail-ships and the supernatural, muskets and sci-fi tech of a long-dead civilization rule the land (and seas).
- Austeria: A high fantasy war zone.
- Dungeonlands: An old school killer dungeon paying homage to the original "S series" of D&D modules.
- Fae Lands: A realm themed around Celtic-folklore, where chaotic magic makes an ever-changing setting.

== System and changes ==
Suzerain Legends utilizes the SWADE edition of the Savage Worlds roleplaying system. As with most settings in Savage Worlds, some notable changes and additions help flesh out the setting:

=== "Bennies"→"Karma" ===
Bennies are renamed to Karma (the good favor of the universe's powers-that-be) to be more thematic for the Suzerain universe. Additionally, some new specific Edges interact with Karma directly.

=== "Power Points"→"Pulse" ===
Suzerain replaces Power Points with the "pulse of all things" - Pulse for short. Pulse is the energy of the soul, but it also infuses everything in the universe. All abilities that are powered by Pulse draw from the same pool, and every hero has Pulse-using abilities (in standard SWADE only those with an Arcane Background have supernatural abilities using Power Points).

=== Races ===
The Suzerain universe is filled with races, some familiar, others new. Humans gain one free Edge as normal for Savage Worlds, or players can choose a racial template from one of the available realms. Racial templates also come with a series of racial Edges that players can specialize into, meaning that one player's wolfen (werewolf) hero can be quite different to another's.

=== Advancement ===
Suzerain works in a similar fashion to the traditional Savage Worlds system, but with an additional Rank after Legendary.

Rank	Advances	XP
Novice	0-3	0–19
Seasoned	4–7	20–39
Veteran	8–11	40–59
Heroic	12–15	60–79
Legendary	16-19	80-119
Demigod	20+	120+

=== Fatigue ===
In Suzerain, the Fatigue track is extended by one additional space to include "debilitated", the equivalent to "Incapacitated" on the Wound track.

=== Edges and Hindrances ===
In Suzerain these operate functionally the same as standard SWADE, but the core Primer and Rules book includes myriad new Edges and Hindrances that are thematic for the Suzerain universe, often adding new uses for Pulse.

=== A hero's Telesma ===
Each Suzerain hero (the playable characters of Suzerain Legends) has a magical gemstone called a Telesma with a sentient spirit bound into it. The spirit gives its hero the ability to see and use portals to different points in time and space, and to blend in with the locals in those places.
