= Fire & Brimstone (Deadlands) =

Role-playing game

Cover art by Paolo Parente, 1998

Fire & Brimstone is a supplement published by Pinnacle Entertainment Group in 1998 for the Old West horror role-playing game Deadlands.

== Contents ==
Fire & Brimstone details rules for the creation of "Blessed" player characters — "preachers" in the parlance of the Old West — for several major religions. The book includes advice on handling matters of faith during the game, new character archetypes, new miracles, rules for divine intervention and various holy relics. The book also includes an adventure scenario titled "The Mission".

== Publication history ==
Pinnacle Entertainment Group published the "Weird West" horror role-playing game Deadlands in 1996, and followed up with a variety of supplements, including Fire & Brimstone, a 138-page softcover book designed by John Goff, with interior art by Mike Chen, Mike Clem, James Crabtree, Paul Daly, Kim DeMulder, Geoff Hassing, Scott James, Jeff Lahren, Ashe Marler, Allen Nunis, Andy Park, and Loston Wallace, and cover art by Paolo Parente. A Polish-language version, Płacz i zgrzytanie zębów, was published in 2002, and a German-language version, Feuer & Schwefel, was published in 2009.

== Reception ==
Fire & Brimstone was reviewed in the online second version of Pyramid which said "Fire & Brimstone is the much-anticipated Blessed supplement to Pinnacle's deservedly award-winning Deadlands RPG. Those already familiar with the game are well aware that, along with the Native American Shamans, the Blessed are probably the only real hope of ever hammering down the legions of Hell that were unleashed at the beginning of the series. As the title implies, the Blessed are your fire-and-brimstone preachers. They are also a heck of a lot more."

In Issue 36 of Inquest, Jeff Hannes was enthusiastic about this supplement, saying, "Praise the Lord and pass the buckshot! This newest sourcebook for preacher characters in Deadlands' Weird West should blow the lid off religion and prayer."

In Issue 251 of Dragon, Ray Winninger noted that the book was "written in an infectious and entertaining 'old west' tone." Winninger concluded, "This is about as useful and entertaining as character handbooks get."

In Issue 10 of the French gaming magazine Backstab, Geoffrey Picard called this book "the essential supplement to utilise fighters of the faith in the pitiless universe of Deadlands. [...] Ultimately everything is very useful to a gamemaster wishing to give a more mystical tone to their campaign." Picard noted that the book "gives a glimpse of the many adventures that can arise from the presence of a believer within a group." Although he thought the included adventure The Mission had a "completely bogus plot (you know, it's the story of the villain who wants to open a dimensional portal to destroy the world...)", he admitted that the presence of the new type of preacher character "can give rise to particularly brilliant scenes. If you love The Magnificent Seven and The Alamo, this adventure is for you." Picard concluded, "In short, a rather useful and well-made supplement."

== Other reviews and commentary ==
- Zunftblatt #8 (December 2010, in German)
