= The Last Crusade (collectible card game) =

Collectible card game

- Card back of The Last Crusade card game.
- Publishers: Chameleon Eclectic Entertainment
- Players: 2 or more
- Setup time: < 5 minutes
- Playing time: < 60 minutes

The Last Crusade is an out-of-print collectible card game originally published in December 1995 by Virginia-based Chameleon Eclectic Entertainment until the company closed in early 1999, at which time Pinnacle Entertainment Group took over production.

== Simulation ==
The card game simulates the war between the German Third Reich and the Allied Forces during the Second World War. The Last Crusade was designed by John R. Hopler, a World War II enthusiast who had initially been doing freelance writing and designing work for Chameleon Eclectic and made the transition to Pinnacle along with the card game.

The game uses historically accurate campaigns, weapons, locations, battlefronts and scenarios which players must manage strategically in order to bring their side to victory. Crusade can be played by two or more players each using a deck chosen to represent either the German or Allied Powers. It was also formatted to have the capability of a solitaire mode during which the cards can be used to play the classic one person card game. Despite the game's loss of popularity, online decks have been created and modified as recent as 2005 to include more weapons, countries and campaigns. These cards, while not an official part of the card game, have been adapted by devoted gamers who can print them out and add them to their collection.

Each individual game is played by two sides as either the commander of the U.S. or German army regiment. As commander, you will control the different elements of battle including armor, artillery, infantry, air units and support units, each represented by a playing card. The first expansion to the standard deck came in 2000 in the form of The Last Crusade: The Russian Front. This deck added 200 all-new cards to the game which included Russian terrain and scenarios prevalent in the war. It also included 120 cards from the original deck so it could it be the only purchase needed to wield a formidable fleet, regardless of which side a player chooses.

== Gameplay ==
=== Types of cards ===
The card game uses three main types of cards: Unit cards, Special cards and Terrain cards. Each Unit and Special card is specific to one of the sides unlike the Terrain cards which are neutral and can be used by either side. These Terrain cards are used to lay out the Battlefield on which the game is played and do not move once in place. Unit cards are the actual fighting forces separated into three groups: infantry, armor and aircraft. These are the cards you deploy into the Battlefield to fight against the enemy's units. Special cards include obstacles and abnormal events that may aid in specific strategies being implemented. If a Unit or Special card that you put into play gets destroyed, the opposing team adds the “Supply Cost” indicated on the card to their total points at the battle's conclusion. The battle is completed when a side captures the opposing side's HQ or Headquarters, thus taking control over the entire field of play. This is the point at which each side will add up the total number of points earned from destroying the opposing team's cards. An additional 5 points is awarded to the player who successfully captured the opposing HQ. The player with the highest number of points wins the war, thus, it is possible to win the battle by capturing the HQ, without winning the war as a whole.

=== Limitations ===
When constructing a deck to play with, there is no limit to how many cards you may use, but decks cannot contain more than eight of any one Unit card or more than two of any one Special card. Each player must have six Terrain cards in their deck, from which, three are drawn at random and placed in front of each respective player representing the edge of battle. The total number of Supply Cost points laid down by each player is then subtracted from their beginning Supply Points (U.S. starts with 21, Germany starts with 27). A rolled die that's even numbered allows the U.S. to put down its remaining three Terrain cards at no charge from their Supply Cost. An odd number rolled gives the same privilege to the player representing Germany. In both cases, the player whose number is not rolled, they must discard their remaining three Terrain cards. At this point each player uses their remaining Supply Cost Points to select their starting forces from their Unit and Special cards. These cards are then placed around the players’ respective Terrains to form a square. From each remaining deck, the players draw seven cards to form the starting hand and the game is ready to begin.

=== Attack strength ===
Each Unit and Special Card is labeled with numbers between 1 and 5 detailing their attack strength against certain enemies as well as their protective strength against an opponent's attack. Players take turns executing the 5-Phase Turn Sequence: Reinforcement, Air Action, Recon, Bombardment, and Fire & Maneuver. The first player to initiate their sequence must complete it before the opposition can begin theirs. The Supply Cost Points from each of the units that each that a player decides to deploy are deducted from their total. Once a player uses all of their points, they can no longer bring any new cards into play, thus, the game begins to require more strategy as to which cards should be used when. Destroying attacks from the opponent is the only way to gain back Supply Points which can then be used to deploy additional Unit and Special cards. As numbers dwindle, the opposing HQ becomes far less protected and more vulnerable to attacks. The game ends when the HQ is finally captured at which point the Supply Points are added up to determine the winner.

== Reception ==
Pyramid magazine reviewed The Last Crusade and stated that "It's not the first, and it won't be the last, but it's certainly a good one. A deck consists of 60 cards in a generous mix of 10 rare, 20 uncommon and 30 common. Except for games with no rarity distinctions at all (such as Dixie), TLC has one of the most customer-friendly ratios in the market. You can play a good game with two decks, and you'll be able to get varied deck-building strategies with four to six decks. Unless you're a collector rather than player, there is no need to get all the cards."
