= Rigger 2 =

1997 role-playing game supplement

Cover art by The Edwards, 1997

Rigger 2 is a role-playing game supplement published by FASA in 1997 for the second edition of the dystopian cyberpunk role-playing game Shadowrun.

== Description ==
In the role-playing game Shadowrun, a "rigger" is someone who interfaces with vehicles and other machinery via a neural link, similar to a "console cowboy" in William Gibson's seminal cyberpunk Sprawl trilogy. Rigger 2 is a supplement which provides 2nd-edition rules for standard vehicle operation, vehicle combat, drones, security riggers, vehicle design and customization.

== Publication history ==
FASA published Shadowrun in 1989, and followed it with many supplements and adventures, including Rigger Black Book in 1991. When FASA published a second edition of Shadowrunner, they also announced they would be releasing a second edition update of Rigger Black Book. However, when the lead developer for the Shadowrun line, Tom Dowd stepped down in 1994, the project was put on hiatus. At the time, Jon Szeto was an officer in the U.S. Army who had played Shadowrun for a number of years, and was contributing articles about riggers to the Scrawls from the Sprawls APA. This brought him to the attention of FASA, and when Szeto left the Army in 1996, FASA hired him to write Rigger 2. The result was a 172-page softcover book released in 1997 with cover art by The Edwards, and interior illustrations by Janet Aulisio-Dannheiser, Thomas M. Baxa, Peter Bergting, Joel Biske, Douglas Chaffee, Thomas Gianni, Fred Hooper, Mike Jackson, Scott James, Jeff Laubenstein, John Paul Lona, Kevin Long, Jim Nelson, Mark A. Nelson, Zak Plucinski, Loston Wallace, and Shane White.

The supplement proved popular enough that FASA published updated versions for the 3rd, 4th and 5th editions of Shadowrunner.

== Reception ==
Rigger 2 was reviewed in Pyramid #29 (Jan./Feb., 1998), which said "Author Jonathan Szeto has turned riggers from the archetype that no one ever played to a popular and intriguing roleplaying option."

Guide du Rôliste Galactique noted that this book was a successor to Rigger Black Book rather than a sequel, saying, "Indeed, if it describes in detail the machines available, the accent is now placed on the associated rules. Thus, the entire vehicular combat system is overhauled and supplants that of the base book."

== Other reviews and commentary ==
- Backstab #7 (in French)
- Envoyer #20
- Casus Belli #112
