= Weird Wars =

Tabletop role-playing game supplement

- Weird War II: Blood on the Rhine
- Designers: John R. Hopler; Shane Lacy Hensley
- Publishers: Pinnacle Entertainment Group
- Publication: 2001; 25 years ago
- Genres: Horror, alternate history
- Systems: d20 System, Savage Worlds

Weird Wars is a series of horror role-playing games set during past and future wars and published by Pinnacle Entertainment Group. The original release, Weird War II: Blood on the Rhine was set during World War II, and utilized the d20 System. The second release, Tour of Darkness was set during the Vietnam War and employed the Savage Worlds rules set. A third release, also for Savage Worlds, Necropolis was set in the future on a war-torn planet.

== Setting ==
In the original Weird War II, players play as Allied soldiers during the Second World War. The setting presents a supernatural element, and characters face (and drive) haunted vehicles, fight mutant Nazi soldiers and investigate the supernatural. Heroes who face the supernatural can be offered membership in the Office of Supernatural Investigations (OSI), which then allows them to take the OSI Chaplain and OSI Adept Prestige Classes (which grant access to Divine and Arcane Magic respectively). Magic is handled differently in this setting than in other d20 settings, being cast by means of Runes and causing Fatigue to the caster.

Hitler and his Nazis have their own magic-users: Blood Mages, who can be amongst the toughest foes the players later face.

Blood Mages are essentially Adepts of Evil Alignment, which grants them the power to draw upon the 'innate evil' of places such as Death Camps and battlefields. Because the only difference between a Blood Mage and an Adept is Alignment, it is possible to play an Allied Blood Mage, though not recommended, as both the OSI and the Sons of Solomon (a secret organization devoted to hiding the supernatural) will come after them if they are discovered.

Magic is low-powered in this setting; Mages only receive spells up to the 5th level, and the only offensive powers in their arsenal are Magic Missile and Cloudkill, which blend in better with the chaos of the battlefield, mimicking bullets and clouds of poison gas respectively.

The books in the setting are:

- Blood on the Rhine - the Core rulebook
- Afrika Korpse - Sourcebook for Africa and Egypt
- Dead From Above - Sourcebook for aircraft and several flying monsters
- Horrors of Weird War Two - Beastiary, expanding the list of monsters from Blood on the Rhine and the various Sourcebooks
- Land of the Rising Dead - Sourcebook for the Pacific Theatre
- Hell in the Hedgerows - Adventure book, containing three adventures
- Hell Freezes Over - Sourcebook for the Russian Front
