= Deadlands: Reloaded =

Western horror role-playing game

Deadlands: Reloaded is a Western horror role-playing game published by Great White Games in 2005 under their Pinnacle Entertainment Group imprint. The game is a revision of the Deadlands role-playing game published nine years earlier. The original game had a custom rule set; this revision uses the cross-genre Savage Worlds game rules.

== Contents ==
Deadlands: Reloaded is an alternate history role-playing game set in 1879 in the American West that features a mixture of the spaghetti Western, horror, steampunk, and fantasy genres. In this alternate history, the American Civil War did not end in 1865, but carried on until 1878, ending in a draw after the discovery of a spirit force emanating from "ghost rock" that begat numerous incredible yet unstable inventions, as well as a proliferation of walking dead, shamans, weird beasts and other strangeness.

The book includes

- background on the United States in 1879, including history from 1865 to the present, and with special focus on the American West.
- special gear and how much it costs
- communications
- the legal system
- special settings rules for character generation, Fate chips, and grit
- combat rules for gunfights
- various agencies operating in the West
- spells, powers and special devices
- notable places
- monsters and other encounters

== Publication history ==
The original Deadlands was published by Great White Games under their Pinnacle Entertainment Group imprint in 1996, and spawned both a GURPS version (2001), and a d20 System version (2002).

In 2005, Great White Games released an updated version, Deadlands: Reloaded, published again under the company's Pinnacle Entertainment Group label. This 256-page book was written by Shane Lacy Hensley and BD Flory, with additional material by Simon Lucas, Paul Wade-Williams, Dave Blewer, and Piotr Korys, interior art by Aaron Acevedo, Travis Anderson, Chris Appel, Tom Baxa, Melissa A. Benson, Theodor Black, Peter Bradley, Brom, Heather Burton, Paul Carrick, Jim Crabtree, Thomas Denmark, Cris Dornaus, Jason Engle, Edward Fetterman, Tom Fowler, Carl Frank, Dan Frazier, Randy Gallegos, Garem, Tim Gerstmar, Simon Gustafsson, Friedrich Haas, Paul Herbert, Llyn Hunter, Simon Ible, Charles Keegan, Mike Kimble, Lissanne Lake, April Lee, William O'Connor, Paolo Parente, Allan Pollack, Mike Raabe, Ron Spencer, Richard Thomas, Pete Venters, Brian Wackwitz, James Walters, Blake Wilkie, John Worsley, Cheyenne Wright, and cartography by John Worsley. The game uses Great White Games' generic role-playing system Savage Worlds for character generation and skill and combat resolution.

In the 2014 book Designers & Dragons, games historian Shannon Appelcine stated that "Great White Games returned to an old setting with the publication of Deadlands: Reloaded! (2005), which updated Pinnacle's top RPG to the Savage Worlds system."

== Reception ==
Deadlands Reloaded was reviewed in the online second volume of Pyramid.

== Awards ==
At the 2007 Origins Awards, Deadlands: Reloaded was awarded "Best Roleplaying Game Supplement of 2006".
