= Fields of Honor: The American War for Independence =

Board game

Fields of Honor: The American War for Independence is a 2000 board game published by Pinnacle Entertainment Group.

== Publication history ==
Fields of Honor: The American War for Independence is the first release in the Showcase Game series from Pinnacle Entertainment Group.

== Reception ==
The reviewer from the online second volume of Pyramid stated that "FoH: AWI allows beginning and experienced players alike with an enjoyable and attractive game that can be easily played within fifteen minutes of opening the box."

Fields of Honor: The American War for Independence won the Origins Awards in the category "Best Historical Miniatures Rules 2000 ".
