= Western Hero =

Western Hero is a 1991 role-playing supplement for Hero System published by Hero Games/Iron Crown Enterprises.

== Contents ==
Western Hero is a supplement in which adventures can be run using the style of Western films or using historical recreation.

== Publication history ==
Shannon Appelcline noted that after Hero System was published as a universal game system, full genre supplements were released, "The new genres included Ninja Hero (1990), Western Hero (1991), Cyber Hero (1993) and Horror Hero (1994). Matt Forbeck's Western Hero was a notable experiment among these releases because it was a near copy of the Rolemaster genre book Outlaw (1991). By this time ICE was no longer publishing the dual-statted Campaign Classics but they still made this final attempt to share resources between the two games."

== Reception ==
Sean Holland reviewed Western Hero in White Wolf #29 (Oct./Nov., 1991), rating it a 2 out of 5 and stated that "Overall, I found that while Western Hero was strong on roleplaying and adventuring, it suffers from a great lack of historical research which ultimately cripples even its attempts at pure escapist Western adventures."

== Reviews ==
- Dragon #175
