= Shane Lacy Hensley =

American author and game designer

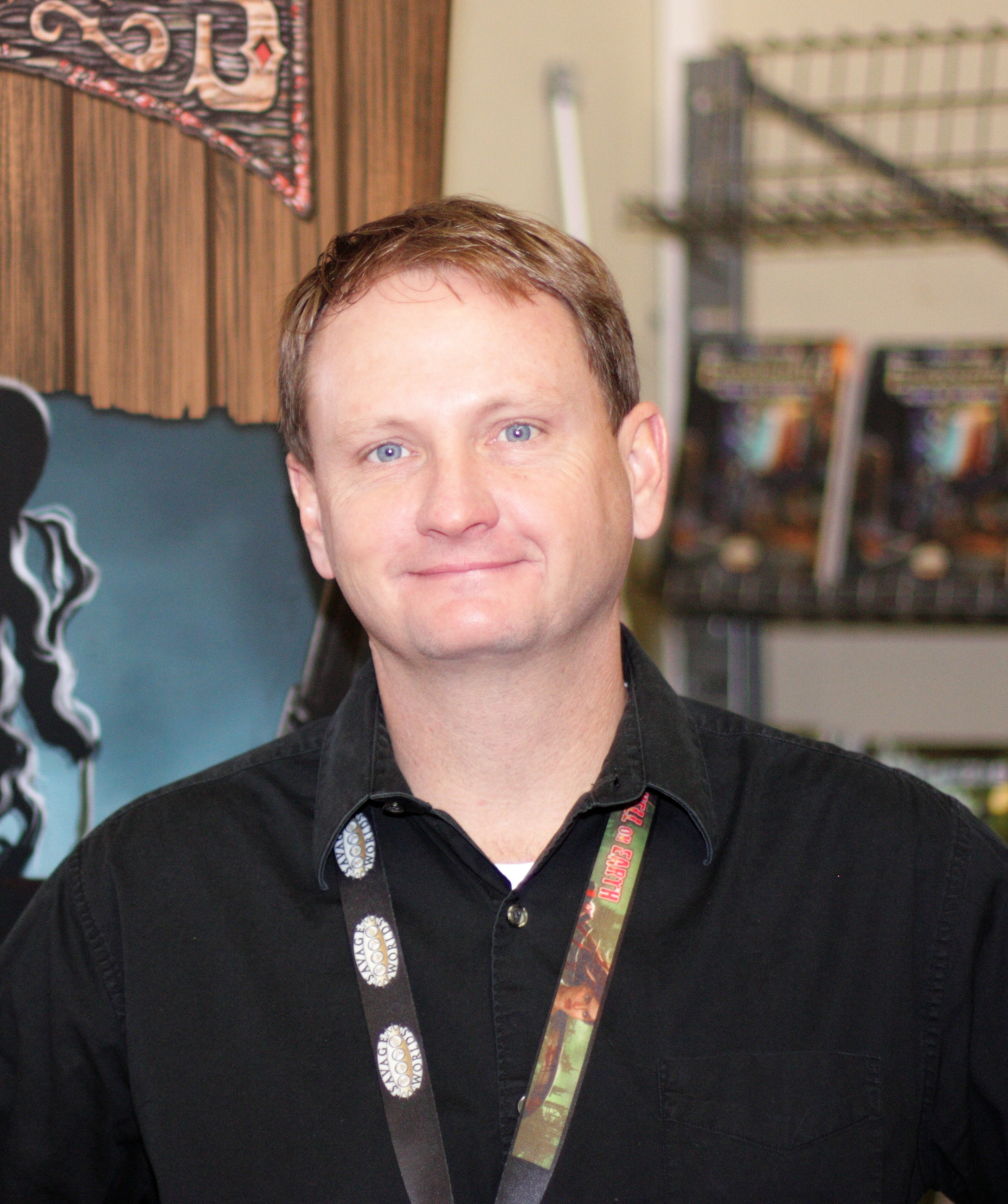
- Hensley at the Play game convention in Modena
- Occupation: Game designer

Shane Lacy Hensley is an author, game designer, and CEO of Pinnacle Entertainment Group and is a resident of Gilbert, Arizona.

== Career ==
Shane Lacy Hensley is from Clintwood, Virginia, and began playing Dungeons & Dragons after seeing comic-strip ads featured in comic books in the 1980s. Hensley later sent West End Games an unsolicited Torg adventure that he authored, which the company published soon after as The Temple of Rec Stalek (1992). Hensley got more work published in the next few years through FASA, TSR, and West End.

Hensley created the game company Pinnacle Entertainment Group in 1994. Hensley reached out to local game company Chameleon Eclectic to publish a 19th-century miniatures game, which they agreed to published in conjunction with Pinnacle as Fields of Honor: The American War for Independence (1994) while Pinnacle retained ownership of the game. Hensley had the idea for a new game featuring cowboys and zombies as he was creating Pinnacle, when he saw a painting by Brom of a Confederate vampire on the cover of White Wolf Publishing's Necropolis: Atlanta; he thus began writing the game that would become Deadlands. After completing a first draft, Henlsey had two friends and game designers flown in, Greg Gorden and Matt Forbeck; both liked his draft and bought into Pinnacle, although Gorden soon left for personal reasons. Hensley did some computer game design work for SSI. Forbeck left Pinnacle a few years later, leaving Hensley again as the sole owner.

An announcement was made on September 13, 2000, that Pinnacle had been sold to the company Cybergames.com. Cybergames used their income from acquisitions to buy other companies - causing harm to the cashflow of their individual companies and ruining their production schedules – and Hensley announced on January 12, 2001, that the acquisition of Pinnacle had been "undone" after considerable damage left Pinnacle with only a handful of employees. Hensley joined the d20 boom, beginning a new d20-based Weird Wars campaign with Blood on the Rhine (2001). In 2003, Hensley formed the company Great White Games and moved all of the IP from Pinnacle to Great White, as well as publishing the new game Savage Worlds (2003). Hensley joined Cryptic Studios in 2004. With senior developer David "Zeb" Cook, Hensley was the senior writer on City of Villains (2005). Hensley designed the role-playing game Army of Darkness (2005) for Eden Studios.

Hensley also worked with Superstition Studios on a Deadlands MMORPG that was never published. Hensley was in charge of Dust Devil Studios and got Zombie Pirates (2010) published. He later rejoined Cryptic Studios and became Executive Producer.

Hensley has written several novels and designed a variety of games including miniatures wargames, tabletop wargames, and role-playing games, as well as substantial freelance work writing modules for game systems. He has also scripted at least one computer game. Hensley has been a Guest of Honor at a number of major conventions and has garnered several game industry honors and awards.

He left Cryptic to make a Deadlands MMO in 2007, but the parent company went bankrupt. Hensley briefly returned to Cryptic in 2010 as Executive Producer on Neverwinter, then on to Petroglyph Games to work on the End of Nations MMORTS (published by Trion Worlds).
