= Savage Worlds =

American generic role-playing game

- Explorer's Edition cover, 2007
- Designers: Shane Lacy Hensley
- Publishers: Pinnacle Entertainment Group
- Publication: 2003; 23 years ago
- Genres: Universal, pulp, horror, fantasy, science fiction
- Systems: Savage Worlds

Savage Worlds is a role-playing game written by Shane Lacy Hensley and published by Pinnacle Entertainment Group in 2006. The game emphasizes speed of play and reduced preparation over realism or detail. The game received the 2003 Origin Gamers' Choice Award for best role-playing game.

== Settings ==
Savage Worlds is a generic rule system, with campaign settings or modules designed specifically for the rules. These have included Evernight, 50 Fathoms, Necessary Evil, Rippers, and Low Life. The Pinnacle Entertainment Group has also published setting books based on the company's earlier lines, including Deadlands: Reloaded as well as the Tour of Darkness, Necropolis, and Weird War II settings based on the Weird Wars line.

Beginning with 50 Fathoms, the majority of settings feature a concept called plot point campaign." These are a series of loosely defined adventure scenarios, with a main storyline presented as a series of plot points, and additional side-quests (or "Savage Tales") to expand the scope of the campaign. This format allows a group of characters to explore the game universe while playing through (or disregarding) the main storyline in a manner similar to that of role-playing video games.

Pinnacle licenses Savage Worlds. Such "Savaged!" licensees are allowed to use the Savage Worlds mascot "Smiling Jack" as a logo on their products. Multiple licensed PDF adventure scenarios are available, as well as setting related supplements like the Vampire Earth RPG Sourcebook and the Suzerain Legends RPG meta setting.

== System ==
=== Character creation ===
Player characters are built using a point allocation system, though gamemasters are encouraged to design non-player characters to the needs of the game rather than to fit the system. Characters in Savage Worlds are composed of a variety of statistics, including Race, Traits, Edges, Hindrances, and sometimes Powers.

==== Race ====
A character's race usually refers to their species, which may apply positive or negative modifiers to characteristics. In some settings (such as the Pirates of the Spanish Main RPG), this may instead refer to nationality. Nationality-based differences may occur in campaigns where certain skill specializations, edges, and hindrances are affected by cultural or technological differences or are included to add flavor to a character. For instance, in Deadlands: Reloaded, a non-Chinese character may learn Chinese martial arts but cannot acquire and use its chi-based Powers. In Weird War II, American, British, or French soldiers have special edges and hindrances to reflect their different national and military cultures.

==== Traits (Attributes & Skills) ====
A character's traits are characteristics that are rated by a single polyhedral die. The larger the die, the better the character is at the trait, ranging from a 4-sided die (d4—the lowest) to a 12-sided die (d12—the highest). For example, a character with a strength trait of a ten-sided die (d10) is stronger than a character whose strength trait is rated with a six-sided die (d6). Traits are divided into attributes, which are inherent, and skills, which are learned.

When creating a new, novice-rank character, the player gets 5 character points to spend on attributes and 15 character points to spend on skills. Some game worlds offer more or fewer character creation points to reflect the world's overall difficulty or the characters' overall experience. After character creation, unused points are lost. During play, characters earn experience points, which they subsequently spend to acquire new abilities or improve existing ones.

The five attributes used in Savage Worlds are agility (physical precision and speed), smarts (mental power), spirit (willpower), strength (physical power), and vigor (physical health).

In addition to attributes, a character has the following derived statistics: pace (ground speed), parry (the ability to defend oneself in melee combat), toughness (resistance to damage), and charisma (presence and charm). Some setting supplements add a fifth derived statistic such as reason (problem solving), sanity (mental health), or grit (mental fortitude) to reflect the special needs of the game world.

Like in the FUDGE and FATE systems, the skills are broad and allow the character to use them for a variety of related tasks. For instance, a character skilled in fighting can fight unarmed or with melee weapons. They might also be able to identify and counter an opponent's fighting style, know the name and reputation of a skilled fighter they meet, figure out the nationality and rank of a soldier by their uniform and insignia, or locate and hire a mercenary or bodyguard. Healing could be used to diagnose an illness, identify medicinal herbs or pharmaceutical drugs, find a healer or medical specialist, or prevent a disease outbreak in an encampment by organizing sanitation protocols.

==== Edges and Hindrances ====
Characters are also customized with advantages and disadvantages known as edges and hindrances, respectively. Edges and hindrances, unlike traits, are not rated with dice. Edges cost points, and some require the character to first attain a certain amount of experience. They are also grouped by type, which may—depending on the campaign or world—affect their availability. Background edges can only be granted at character creation, social edges affect interactions with other characters, combat edges affect the character's fighting skills, and leadership edges grant various bonuses to the character and those under his command. Professional edges are related to the character's job or role and affect their career skills. Power, Weird, or Wild Card Edges are supernatural, paranormal, or superhuman advantages that grant bonuses to Powers; they may not be available in mundane game worlds. Hindrances (character disadvantages) grant points used to purchase edges and are ranked as minor (which grants one point) or major (which grants two points).

==== Powers ====
Some game worlds have the option of granting superhuman abilities to characters, usually with a magical, mystical, technological, psionic, racial, or mutant origin. Like edges, they are ranked and can be improved or acquired by leveling up.

=== Task resolution ===
Dice are rolled to determine the outcome of character actions and interactions in the game. For actions not directly contested by another character, a trait die is rolled against a target number (TN), which is usually 4, although tasks with higher difficulties have higher TN. If the roll equals or exceeds the TN, the action succeeds; if it is less than the TN, it fails. Succeeding a TN by 4 or more is called a "raise;" additional raises are scored for every further 4 points over the task's TN. Raises are equivalent to critical hits in other roleplaying systems; they grant additional bonuses or otherwise enhance the outcome of a successful task.

For actions directly contested by another character, there is no TN. Instead, both characters make a relevant skill check and the winner is the one with the higher result. The winner can still score raises if he exceeds his opponent's roll by 4 or more.

If a player rolls the highest number possible on a given die (such as an 8 on an eight-sided die, or "d8"), the die may be re-rolled and its result added to the previous result. This is known as "acing" or "exploding." A die may continue to ace/explode as long as the highest die number continues to be rolled. Rolling a "natural 1" (an unmodified result of 1) on a trait roll is a "bust" and is considered an automatic failure unless a benny is spent (see below).

==== Wild Cards ====
Player characters and significant non-player characters are known as "Wild Cards." Wild cards get to roll a distinctive six-sided die known as a "wild die" alongside their trait die. The wild die may ace as normal. The player of the wild card uses the higher of the two rolls (trait die or wild die) to determine the actual result of the roll. Rolling a "natural 1" on both dice is called "snake eyes" and is considered a critical failure. Depending on the setting's rules, snake eyes either cannot be bought off with a benny or costs two bennies.

==== Bennies ====
Short for "benefits," bennies are tokens granted to wild cards at the start of each play session. Typically, each wild card receives three bennies per session, although many variables can alter this number. Bennies can be spent to reduce damage taken, to reroll an undesirable result, to activate certain edges, or in a number of other ways. Bennies can be earned during play as rewards for good roleplay or by completing certain objectives.

=== Initiative ===
Combat initiative is determined by a standard deck of playing cards (with two jokers). Each wild card or homogeneous group of Gamemaster characters gets to draw a card. If a wild card character has a group of followers under his command, the character's initiative is shared with them. Characters act in sequence according to the draw of the cards, with the highest card (Ace) acting first and the lowest card (2) acting last. Ties are broken by suit in reverse alphabetical order (spades, hearts, diamonds, clubs). Players with high initiative can also hold their actions until later in the turn.

Characters may take multiple actions at once if they are different (e.g., taunt or intimidate an opponent while shooting a pistol or fighting with a weapon). In most situations, taking multiple actions in a single turn incurs cumulative penalties.

Jokers beat all other cards and additionally give +2 bonuses on trait and damage rolls made that round. Any player that receives a joker during initiative may take their action at any time during the round or can interrupt another character's action. The deck is reshuffled after a joker is dealt.

== History ==
In 1997, Pinnacle published Deadlands: the Great Rail Wars, a miniature wargame set in the "Weird West" world of Hensley's Deadlands role-playing game. The rules were a greatly simplified version of the full Deadlands system, focused on one-on-one skirmishes.

In 2003, the rules from The Great Rail Wars were revised and expanded into a generic, simple but complete role-playing system and retitled Savage Worlds. At Origins 2003, Savage Worlds was awarded the Gamer's Choice Award in the Roleplaying Game category. The main rulebook was revised and released as a PDF in late 2004, with a print version following in early 2005. The same year, Great White Games began releasing rules expansions in the form of several PDF format genre toolkit books. Self-contained miniature skirmish games based upon the Savage Worlds engine were also released in print and PDF form.

Deadlands Reloaded, a version of the game using the Savage Worlds rules, was released in May 2006. In late 2005, Pinnacle entered into an agreement with WizKids to publish self-contained RPGs set in the worlds of Pirates of the Spanish Main, Rocketmen, and MageKnight using the Savage Worlds rules. Of the three licenses, only The Pirates of the Spanish Main RPG saw release, and was published in April 2007. In 2007 Pinnacle released the licensed game, The Savage World of Solomon Kane.

In October 2007, Pinnacle released the Savage Worlds Explorer's Edition, a digest size paperback edition of the rules. It featured revisions to the melee damage rules first introduced in Deadlands Reloaded, as well as new chase rules. It was released at Origins 2007. At that event, Deadlands Reloaded won the Origins Award in the category of Best Roleplaying Game Supplement.

In August 2011, Pinnacle released Savage Worlds Deluxe, a hardcover expanded version of the rules found in the Explorer's Edition.

In August 2012, Pinnacle released a digest size paperback edition of the deluxe rules, Savage Worlds Deluxe Explorer's Edition.

In 2015 Pinnacle announced a series of supplements converting Rifts to the Savage Worlds system.

In 2018 Pinnacle released the Savage Worlds Adventure Edition.

In November 2020 Pinnacle announced Pathfinder for Savage Worlds, an adaptation of the setting of Paizo's Pathfinder Roleplaying Game and serialized Adventure Path modules beginning with the first Adventure Path, Rise of the Runelords.

== Reception ==
Pyramid called the original release "rather good" but "rather overpriced".

Scott Taylor for Black Gate in 2013 rated Savage Worlds as Honorable Mention #1 in the top ten role-playing games of all time, saying "I truly can't say enough about this system that hasn't already been said with its various awards, but dang, in the end you get to use playing cards and poker chips as you game, and that just takes it over the top!"

In his 2023 book Monsters, Aliens, and Holes in the Ground, RPG historian Stu Horvath noted, "The GM section of the rulebook runs just a handful of pages and encourages a GM to cut out as much work as possible — keep it fast, furious, and fun, just like the cover says." Horvath also mentioned the game systems that have simplified their rules by converting to Savage Worlds, saying, "Many interesting game worlds that were saddled with complex systems are now regularly mentioned in the same breath as Savage Worlds — Skyrealms of Jorune, Shadowrun, Rifts."

== Reviews ==
- Backstab #45

== See also ==
- Deadlands
- List of Savage Worlds books
- Suzerain Legends
