= Deadlands =

Tabletop Western horror role-playing game

- First edition cover art by Gerald Brom
- Designers: Shane Lacy Hensley
- Publishers: Pinnacle Entertainment Group
- Publication: 1996 (1st edition); 1999 (2nd edition); 2006 (Deadlands: Reloaded)
- Genres: Alternate history, Western, Horror, Steampunk, Fantasy, Weird West
- Systems: d20 System, GURPS, Savage Worlds

Deadlands is a genre-mixing alternate history role-playing game which combines the Western and horror genres, with some steampunk elements. The original game was written by Shane Lacy Hensley and published by Pinnacle Entertainment Group in 1996.

The eight-time Origins Award–winning setting has been converted to many other systems over the years and is available in the original Classic Rules, the revised Classic Rules, d20 System and GURPS adaptations, and a Savage Worlds version called Deadlands: Reloaded.

== Development ==
Shane Lacy Hensley had the idea for a new game focusing on cowboys and zombies in 1994 as he was setting up his company Pinnacle Entertainment Group, when he saw a painting by Brom of a Confederate vampire on the cover of White Wolf Publishing's soon-to-be released Necropolis: Atlanta supplement; he then began writing the game that became Deadlands, and after completing a first draft, Hensley flew in two game designer friends of his, Greg Gorden and Matt Forbeck, and both of them liked the game enough that they asked to buy into Pinnacle.

== Setting ==
The game is set in the United States in the last quarter of the 19th century. The canonical year for the first edition of Deadlands is 1876. A later supplement, Tales o' Terror, advances the game's backstory and metaplot ahead one year, to 1877. The second edition of Deadlands uses the updated backstory of 1877 as the canonical starting point. Deadlands: Reloaded further updates the backstory and advances the canonical starting point to 1879.

The basic rules provide for characters and settings that could be expected to appear in the "Wild West" genre of movies and pulp fiction, and most of the in-game action is presumed to occur in the wild frontiers of the American West, or in barely tamed frontier towns like Tombstone, Arizona or Dodge City, Kansas. However, later supplements expanded the in-game adventuring area to include places such as the Deep South, the Mississippi River, Mexico, and the Northeastern United States. These supplements often provide for adventures set in urban areas such as New Orleans, New York City, or Boston.

The canonical, basic setting is referred to as the "Weird West" due to the juxtaposition of the Western setting with the horrific and fantastical elements of the game. The history of the Weird West is identical to real-world history, up until July 3, 1863. On this date in the game, a group of American Indians from various tribes, led by a Sioux shaman known as "Raven," performed a ritual in an effort to drive out the European settlers. This ritual created a conduit to a spiritual realm populated by powerful malicious entities known as the "Reckoners". The events surrounding and immediately subsequent to Raven's ritual is known as "The Reckoning".

The Reckoners feed on negative emotions, particularly fear. Sufficient levels of fear in the population of a given location allow the Reckoners to begin subtly altering the environment of that location: the sun shines a little less brightly, trees become stunted and "evil" looking, rock formations take on the appearance of corpses or monsters, and so on. The more powerful the fear, the greater the environmental changes.

The ultimate goal of the Reckoners is to turn the entire Earth into an evil, haunted wasteland — literally a Hell on Earth. However, the Reckoners cannot directly enter Earth's realm unless the overall fear level of the entire planet becomes sufficiently high. To this end, they use their powers to create monsters, madmen, zombies, and other creatures and villains that will sow fear and terror throughout the land.

The first instance of this occurred on July 4, 1863, at the site of the Battle of Gettysburg that had just ended; dead soldiers from both sides of the conflict rose from the battlefield and began indiscriminately attacking the surviving soldiers and civilians. Since then, undead gunslingers, hostile Indian spirits, strange cults, and deadly creatures have begun terrorizing the world. The American Civil War drags on thanks to the machinations of the Reckoners, and the country remains divided into U.S. and Confederate sections along with "disputed territories". Federal agents and Texas Rangers struggle to deal with the eldritch menaces while hiding the awful truth from the general public. Seismic upheavals have pushed much of California into the ocean, creating a badlands area known as "the Great Maze". In the Great Maze, miners discover "ghost rock," a mineral that burns hotter and longer than coal and is used as the basis for most Deadlands technology as well as alchemical potions and semi-magical materials.

The unleashing of the Reckoners has had a number of important side effects. Magic was revealed to be real, although it involves challenging otherworldly spirits, "manitous", in contests that are either viewed as a negotiation or a test of will. These same manitous can possess a recently deceased body and reanimate it, creating a "Harrowed". Harrowed beings are sometimes under the control of the spirit (which uses the opportunity to spread fear) and sometimes under the control of the deceased being. Scientific progress rapidly advances as the Reckoners support experimental designs that normally would not work. This progress drives the technological level of Deadlands from historical levels to a "steampunk" setting.

Players take on the role of various mundane or arcane character types, including Gunfighters, Lawmen (such as U.S. Marshals or local sheriffs), Hucksters (magic users), Shamans, Blessed (those of faith), and Mad Scientists in an attempt to learn about the Reckoning and the mysterious beings behind it.

== System ==
Deadlands features a unique way of creating playing characters for the game. Instead of spending character points, or randomly rolling dice, a character's abilities are determined by drawing cards from a standard 54-card poker deck (jokers included), which determine the character's Traits (their basic attributes). The game also uses polyhedral dice (d4, d6, d8, d10, d12, and d20) which are referred to as the "Bones", and a set of white, red, and blue poker chips called "Fate Chips".

In a Deadlands game, the Game Master is called The Marshal, and the players are called The Posse.

To perform an action a player rolls for successes with a handful of dice and hopes that at least one of the dice rolls the Target Number or higher. Rolling the highest possible number on any of the dice is known as "rolling an ace", and that die may be re-rolled, with the total being added to the initial roll value. In most cases only the highest single die's value (with "aces" added) is compared to a target number. For each five points over the target number the character is considered to have a "raise" which typically makes the character's action more effective. When attacking someone, raises give the attacker more control over where on the victim's body the blow or bullet strikes. When attempting to quickly reload a gun, each raise allows another round of ammunition to be loaded in a single action.

=== Spell casting ===
Players with huckster characters use a deck of playing cards in addition to dice to cast their spells (hexes). A successful skill check allows the player to draw five or more cards and makes the best possible poker hand with those cards. The strength of the hand determines not only whether the hex was successfully cast, but also the strength of its effects. In the game world, this mechanic is explained as the huckster literally gambling with a magical spirit in order to get it to do his or her bidding — a high ranking poker hand means the huckster has won, and the spirit casts the hex as desired; a low ranking poker hand results in failure. Both jokers are present and wild, increasing the chance of a good hand, but the black joker means that the spirit does something harmful to the huckster.

Blessed characters can use their faith to invoke miracles—they pray for their patron to grant their request. The miracles are usually protective or restorative in nature, although there are some for attack. The difficulty of a given miracle (the amount of faith required by the patron for their assistance) can vary. For example, a priest seeking to heal a gunshot to the stomach would require more faith than if he were trying to mend a broken arm. Although the basic miracle set is predominantly Christian in nature, one of the extension sourcebooks includes miracles from other religions, and some of those are not permitted to Christian player characters.

Native American shamans cast spells by making deals with spirits. This happens in three stages: the shaman asks for a favor, performs the ritual that tradition demands for that favor, and then his skill is tested by the spirit. If he succeeds all three, he earns "appeasement points" according to how well he succeeded. If he earned enough points for the favor, it is granted. If not, his work was in vain.

=== Action Decks ===
Instead of rolling for Initiative as in most other RPGs, the players make a "speed" roll on the bones — the exact number and type being rolled determined by each character's stats — and then draw a number of cards from a community playing card deck based on the results of that roll. The Marshal then calls out card values, starting from Aces and going all the way down to Deuces. The card's suit (Spades, Hearts, Diamonds, Clubs, which is reverse alphabetical order and also the valuation in poker and bridge) indicates who goes first if the same value of card is drawn.

=== Fate Chips ===
Along with Bones and Cards, characters get Fate Chips which are typically poker chips, although colored stones or coins can also be used. These are drawn from a hat or some other container that the player blindly chooses at the beginning of play. Each player draws a certain number of Fate Chips at the beginning of the game from the Fate Pot, modified according to player actions and Marshal preference. Fate chips can be spent for in-game bonuses such as bonus dice to use during certain rolls, or the prevention of physical damage. The Marshal can draw chips as well for enemies to use.

=== Bounties ===
At the end of a gaming session, players can cash in unused Fate Chips for Bounty Points. These are like Experience Points in other systems and are used to improve Traits and Aptitudes. The Marshal may also award additional Bounty Points at the end of the session for completing the mission objectives and any exceptional role-playing by players.

=== Instant rewards for roleplaying ===
Marshals are also encouraged to reward players with instantaneous rewards for good role-playing. During character creation players can choose "Hindrances" (disadvantages) such as Big Britches, Bloodthirsty, or Big Mouth. When a player role-plays this Hindrance well, the Marshal can reward them instantly with a Fate Chip. This has the effect of promoting and encouraging role-playing.

== Spinoff games ==
The "Weird West" mark is used to distinguish the primary game setting from the various other settings:

- Deadlands: The Great Rail Wars: a tabletop wargame with miniature figures.
- Doomtown: a collectible card game. A sourcebook for the town described in the game was released under the title Doomtown or Bust!. A secondary sourcebook, detailing the town after the events of the CCG, was released under the title The Black Circle. A third sourcebook titled The Collegium, detailing the Mad Scientist faction of the same name, was also released.
- Range Wars: a tabletop wargame that used collectible cardboard disks instead of miniatures. As much a spin-off from Doomtown as Deadlands, it used many of the same factions. It is based on the Disk Wars game. The base set: Doomtown: Range Wars was released, and a single expansion, Ghost Creek. Material from this game was incorporated into the Black Circle sourcebook.
- Deadlands: Hell on Earth: a role-playing game set in one possible future of the Weird West, where the Reckoners succeeded in turning the entire Earth into a haunted wasteland. This game features elements from the Western genre as well as elements from Mad Max-esque post-apocalyptic fiction and, of course, horror.
- Deadlands: Lost Colony: a role-playing game set in the same future as Deadlands: Hell on Earth, except on another planet. This game features sci-fi, Western, and horror elements.
- Deadlands: Lost Colony CCG: A collectible card game with the same setting as the Lost Colony RPG.
- Savage Worlds: a miniatures and generic role-playing game system derived from The Great Rail Wars.
- Deadlands: The Battle For Slaughter Gulch: A board game from Twilight creations.
- FRAG Deadlands: A first-person shooter themed board game in the Frag series from Steve Jackson Games.
- Deadlands: a cancelled video game developed by Headfirst Productions for the PC, Xbox and PlayStation 2.
- Deadlands Noir: Set in the same world, but in a Dieselpunk 1930s New Orleans.
- Deadlands® Dark Ages: The latest chapter in the Deadlands universe is set in Britain in the year 877.

Another version of Doomtown called Doomtown:Reloaded was released at GenCon in August 2014 by Alderac Entertainment Group, with the game (in September 2014) already being in its third printing. Doomtown: Reloaded is similar to the older version, (now referred to as Classic) with a number of rule revisions that have streamlined and simplified the game. The four factions released initially were the Law Dogs, The Sloan Gang, The Fourth Ring and the Morgan Cattle Company.

== Deadlands: Reloaded ==
In May 2006, Great White Games published a new edition of Deadlands under the company's Pinnacle Entertainment Group label. This new edition, written by Shane Lacy Hensley and B.D. Flory and entitled Deadlands: Reloaded, used Great White Games' Savage Worlds generic role-playing system. The 256-page setting book updates the canonical setting to 1879 and includes information on the events of the past year, as well as new rules. Among the most drastic changes to the basic Savage Worlds rules was "The Way of the Brave" rule, which revamped the way combat works in the system, making it more dangerous and deadly for characters and increasing the effectiveness of melee combat. This book also updated Fate Chips to work with the Savage Worlds system. This book marked a first for Great White Games in that it is the first setting book published without a scripted or plot point campaign.

The publisher has hinted that four complete plot point campaign books will be released for Deadlands: Reloaded, each focusing on certain regions and events in the metaplot of the game. In 2009 the first of these campaigns, The Flood, was released. In 2012, the second of these campaigns, The Last Sons, was released. Matthew Cutter of Pinnacle has also stated that updated Hell on Earth and Lost Colony books will be published for the Savage Worlds system. The Hell on Earth update was released in 2012. Additionally, an equipment guide "The Smith & Robards Catalog", was published in 2011. A successfully funded Kickstarter for a new spin-off setting, Deadlands Noir, was conducted from May to June 2012, with the product's release expected in 2013. Reaper miniatures has, as of August 2012, solicited two white-metal miniatures for the Deadlands Noire setting to distributors: "Stone" and "Femme Fatal"

== Release history ==
- 1996–1999: Original Deadlands custom rules. Exists also in hardcover and leatherbound collector editions.
- 1999–2006: Revised Deadlands custom rules.
- 2001: Deadlands d20 for the d20 System rules. Supported for several years.
- October 2001: GURPS rules, done under license to Steve Jackson Games
  - GURPS Deadlands: Hexes supplement
  - GURPS Deadlands: Varmints supplement
  - GURPS Deadlands Dime Novel 1—Aces and Eights (adventure)
  - GURPS Deadlands Dime Novel 2—Wanted: Undead or Alive (adventure)
- May 2006: Savage Worlds rules in Deadlands: Reloaded.
- May 2017: Deadlands 20th Anniversary Edition is published after a successful crowdfunding campaign in 2016. The content is in color, but otherwise the same as the 1999 edition.
- 2020: Rerelease of 2001 GURPS material as Classic GURPS
- 2021: Deadlands: The Weird West revised for compatibility with latest edition Savage Worlds rules

== Reception ==
In the December 1996 edition of Dragon (issue 236), Rick Swan liked the energy of the Western/horror mash-up, comparing it to Shadowrun's "revolutionary mix of fantasy and cyberpunk." However, Swan criticized the lack of setting details: "What we're given is little more than an overview... there are no interesting personalities to speak of. There's next to nothing about geography, politics, or culture. Cities, villages, places to explore—practically none. And there's not a single ready-to-play adventure." He concluded by giving the game a "good" rating of 4 out of 6, saying, "Deadlands is by no means bad. It's beautifully written and bursting with nifty ideas. It strikes a masterful balance between high camp and high adventure. It has a great cover. But it's incomplete; with a setting this skeletal and the absence of adventures, how's a newcomer supposed to cobble together a campaign?"

Andy Butcher reviewed Deadlands: The Weird West for Arcane magazine, rating it a 9 out of 10 overall, and stated that "A wonderfully effective combination of traditional Westerns with the horror and steampunk genres, backed up by an innovative and well-designed rules system that not only complements the setting, but actively promotes the right atmosphere. Deadlands is a rich, evocative and unique roleplaying game that should appeal to a great variety of players. Excellent stuff."

Pyramid magazine reviewed Deadlands and stated that "Deadlands is the new roleplaying game about the Weird West. It's not just tumbleweeds, dusters, and six-shooters; it's manitous, undead gunslingers and hucksters who throw hexes with playing cards. More than that, Deadlands is an experience."

In his 2023 book Monsters, Aliens, and Holes in the Ground, RPG historian Stu Horvath noted that Deadlands was emphatically a product of its time, pointing out, "It is difficult to criticize a game that came out in 1996 for being too emblematic of '90s RPG design, but it's also hard to discuss the game without constantly pointing out just how '90s it is."

== Awards ==
Deadlands, its supplements and spin-offs have won nine Origins Awards:

- Best Role-playing Rules of 1996 for Deadlands
- Best Graphic Presentation of a Role-playing Game, Adventure, or Supplement of 1996 for Deadlands
- Best Science Fiction or Fantasy Miniatures Rules of 1997 for Deadlands: the Great Rail Wars
- Best Roleplaying Adventure of 1997 for Independence Day
- Best Trading Card Game of 1998
- Best Graphic Presentation of a Card Game of 1998
- Best Science Fiction or Fantasy Figure Miniature of 1998 for Hangin' Judge
- Best Vehicle Miniature of 1998 for Velocipede
- Roleplaying Game Supplement of 2007 for Deadlands: Reloaded

== Other reviews and commentary ==
- Valkyrie #14 (1997)
- Shadis #30 (1996)
- Backstab (Issue 1 - Jan/Feb 1997)

== Television series ==
In 2014, Microsoft announced that it was developing an original television series for the Xbox based on Deadlands.

== See also ==
- High Moon
- Jonah Hex
- List of Deadlands: The Weird West publications
- Western genre in other media
