= Pinnacle Entertainment Group =

Pinnacle Entertainment Group is a publisher of role-playing games and wargames.

== History ==
Shane Lacy Hensley wanted to create a 19th-century miniatures game so he contacted the company Chameleon Eclectic to get the game published. As a result Fields of Honor: The American War for Independence (1994) was published in partnership with Chameleon Eclectic, which dealt with functions such as distribution, while ownership of the game stayed with a new company that was founded by Hensley, named Pinnacle Entertainment Group. The next year, Pinnacle and Chameleon Eclectic published their last joint production, the collectible card game The Last Crusade (1995). When he completed the first draft of the game Deadlands, Hensley flew in two of his game designer friends, Greg Gorden and Matt Forbeck, who liked his design and asked if they could buy into the company; although Gordon later left the company for personal reasons, Forbeck moved to Blacksburg, Virginia to help build Pinnacle. Deadlands: The Weird West (1996) was published soon after as the first role-playing game and first independent publication released by Pinnacle.

== Description ==
Pinnacle Entertainment Group is owned and operated by Shane Lacy Hensley and was founded in 1994. Some time before 2003, the company was renamed Great White Games and in 2005 returned to the original name. In 1996 the company published what would be their flagship title for several years Deadlands, a role-playing game set in an alternate-history U.S. of the 1870s. Deadlands features magic and horror amidst the tropes of the Old West. Later that year they would also publish Brave New World, a dystopian superhero role-playing game that used a simplified version of the Deadlands rules.

A second major line was introduced in 2001 called Weird Wars and features horror elements combined with a historical war setting. The first entrant in the Weird Wars line is Weird War II: Blood on the Rhine and uses the d20 System under the Open Gaming License from Wizards of the Coast. A second entry, Tour of Darkness, set during the Vietnam War, was released in 2004 using the Savage Worlds system.

In 2003, as Great White Games, they produced Savage Worlds, a game designed to be both a role-playing game and a miniatures game. A highly streamlined, generic system, it is designed to provide game play in any genre. Subsequent releases for Savage Worlds are self-contained campaigns designed to minimize the preparation time of the GM and maximize the time spent running the game with players. Savage Worlds carries the tag line "Fast! Furious! Fun!" to emphasize the streamlining and quick play inherent in the system.

In late 2005, Shane Hensley announced that Great White Games would return to using the Pinnacle Entertainment Group moniker as its brand name for subsequent releases.
