= 1998 in games =

This page lists board and card games, wargames, miniatures games, and tabletop role-playing games published in 1998. For video games, see 1998 in video gaming.

== Games released or invented in 1998 ==
- Alpha Blitz
- Alternity (role-playing game)
- Aquarius
- Bosworth
- CORPS (role-playing game system)
- Cranium
- Crimson Skies
- Deadlands: Hell on Earth (role-playing game)
- Devil Bunny Needs a Ham
- Doomtown
- Dragon Hordes
- Elfenland
- The Extraordinary Adventures of Baron Munchausen (role-playing game)
- Falling
- Filthy Rich
- GIPF
- Great War at Sea: US Navy Plan Orange
- Great War at Sea 2: The North & Baltic Seas
- Guillotine
- Knightmare Chess 2
- Legend of the Burning Sands
- Lord of the Fries
- Lotus
- Panzer Grenadier
- Reminiscing:The Millennium Edition
- Return to the Tomb of Horrors (for 2nd Edition AD&D)
- Revelation (role-playing game)
- Samurai
- Star*Drive (role-playing game)
- Star Trek: The Next Generation Role-playing Game
- TAMSK
- Through the Desert
- Tribe 8 (role-playing game)
- Twisted Golf
- Warhammer 40,000 (third edition, originally published in 1987)
- Warhammer Ancient Battles
- War of Resistance, China Theater 1937-1941 (Game Research/Design)

== Game awards given in 1998 ==
- Spiel des Jahres: Elfenland - Alan R. Moon, Amigo Spiele
- Games: Fossil

== Significant game-related events in 1998 ==
- Hasbro purchased the name "Avalon Hill", the back inventory of the company, and rights to Avalon Hill titles for US$6 million.
- Rio Grande Games was founded.

== Deaths ==
Date	Name	Age	Notability
April 19	Armand Jammot	76	Television producer and game designer

== See also ==
- 1998 in video gaming
