= 1997 Origins Award winners =

Gaming award winners

The following are the winners of the 24th annual (1997) Origins Award, presented at Origins 1998:

Category	Winner	Company	Designer(s)
Best Abstract Board Game of 1997	Kill Doctor Lucky	Cheapass Games	Designer: James Ernest
Best Historical Board Game of 1997	Successors	The Avalon Hill Game Company	Designers: Mark Simonitch, Richard Berg
Best Science Fiction or Fantasy Board Game of 1997	Roborally Grand Prix	Wizards of the Coast	Designers: Glenn Elliot, Adam Conus, Tom Wylie
Best Graphic Presentation of a Board Game of 1997 (tie)	Wadjet: a Family Adventure Game	Timbuk II, Inc.	Graphic Designer: Dee Pomerleau
Best Graphic Presentation of a Board Game of 1997 (tie)	Successors	The Avalon Hill Game Company	Graphic Designer: Kurt Miller
Best Action Computer Game of 1997	Tomb Raider	Square Software/Eidos Software	
Best Roleplaying Computer Game of 1997	Final Fantasy VII	Eidos Software	
Best Strategy Computer Game of 1997	Sid Meier's Gettysburg	Firaxis	Designers: Sid Meier, Jeff Briggs, Brian Reynolds
Best Amateur Game Magazine of 1997	Starry Wisdom	Chaosium, Inc.	Editors: Dustin Wright, Eric Vogt, Shannon Appel, Drashi Khendup
Best Professional Game Magazine of 1997	Knights of the Dinner Table Magazine	Kenzer & Co.	Developers: Jolly Blackburn, Brian Jelke, Steve Johansson, David Kenzer
Best Trading Card Game of 1997	Shadowrun Trading Card Game Limited Edition	FASA Corp.	Designers: Mike Nielsen, Jim Nelson, Mike Mulvihill
Best Traditional Card Game of 1997	Give Me the Brain	Cheapass Games	Designer: James Ernest
Best Card Game Expansion or Supplement of 1997	L5R—Time of the Void	Five Rings Publishing	Designer: Dave Williams
Best Graphic Presentation of a Card Game of 1997	Shadowrun Trading Card Game Limited Edition	FASA Corp.	Graphic Designers: Jim Nelson, Mike Nielsen
Best Game-Related Novel of 1997	Planar Powers	TSR, Inc.	Author: J. Robert King
Best Game-Related Short Work of 1997	A Forty Share in Innsmouth	Chaosium	Author: C.J. Henderson
Best Roleplaying Adventure of 1997	Independence Day	Pinnacle Entertainment Group, Inc.	Designers: Chris Snyder, Matt Forbeck
Best Roleplaying Supplement of 1997	Delta Green	Pagan Publishing	Designers: Dennis Detwiller, Adam Scott Glancy, John Tynes
Best Roleplaying Game of 1997	Legend of the Five Rings Roleplaying Game	Alderac Entertainment Group	Designer: John Wick
Best Graphic Presentation of a Roleplaying Game, Adventure, or Supplement of 1997	In Nomine	Steve Jackson Games	Graphic Designers: Jeff Koke, Derek Pearcy, Dan Smith
Best Historical Figure Miniatures Series of 1997	Charlie Company U.S. Army Figures	RAFM	Designer: Bob Murch
Best Science Fiction or Fantasy Figure Miniature of 1997	Sisters of Battle Battle Squad (Seraphim)	Games Workshop	Designer: Jes Goodwin
Best Vehicular Miniature of 1997	Call of Cthulhu Roadster	RAFM	Designer: Bob Murch
Best Historical Miniatures Rules of 1997	Flint & Steel	Clash of Arms Games	Designer: Richard Kane
Best Science Fiction or Fantasy Miniatures Rules of 1997	Deadlands: the Great Rail Wars	Pinnacle Entertainment Group, Inc.	Designer: Shane Lacy Hensley
Best New Play-by-Mail Game of 1997	Middle-earth PBM Fourth Age Circa 1000	Game Systems, Inc.	Designers: William B. Feild Jr., Peter G. Stassun
Best Ongoing Play-by-Mail Game of 1997	Star Web	Flying Buffalo, Inc.	Designer: Rick Loomis
1998 Inductees to the Adventure Gaming Hall of Fame	Nuclear War	Flying Buffalo, Inc.	Designer: Douglas Malewicki
1998 Inductees to the Adventure Gaming Hall of Fame	BattleTech Mechs & Vehicles	Ral Partha	Developer: Charles Crain
1998 Inductees to the Adventure Gaming Hall of Fame	Berg's Review of Games	Publisher: Richard Berg	
1998 Inductees to the Adventure Gaming Hall of Fame	Illuminati Play-by-Mail	Adventure Systems, Flying Buffalo, Inc.	Designer: Draper Kauffman
1998 Inductees to the Adventure Gaming Hall of Fame	Middle-earth Play-by-Mail	Game Systems, Inc.	Designers: William B. Feild Jr., Peter G. Stassun
1998 Inductees to the Adventure Gaming Hall of Fame	The Courier	Courier Publications	Publisher: Dick Bryant
1998 Inductees to the Adventure Gaming Hall of Fame	Fire & Movement	Baron Publishing, Diverse Talents, Inc.	
1998 Inductees to the Adventure Gaming Hall of Fame	Steve Jackson Games		
1998 Inductees to the Adventure Gaming Hall of Fame	Strategy & Tactics	SPI, 3W, Decision Games	
