= 1996 in games =

This page lists board and card games, wargames, miniatures games, and tabletop role-playing games published in 1996. For video games, see 1996 in video gaming.

== Games released or invented in 1996 ==
- Age of Renaissance
- Air Baron
- Ani-Mayhem
- Arcadia
- Battle Cattle: The Card Game
- BattleTech Collectible Card Game
- Before I Kill You, Mr. Bond
- Bitin' Off Hedz
- Blood Dawn (role-playing game)
- Cashflow 101
- Conspiracy X (role-playing game)
- Deadlands (role-playing game)
- The Doctor Who Collectible Card Game
- Doctor Who: Invasion Earth
- Entdecker
- Equate
- Fading Suns (role-playing game)
- Feng Shui (role-playing game)
- Fischer random chess
- Five Crowns
- Give Me the Brain
- Great War at Sea: The Mediterranean
- Highlander: The Card Game
- Iron Dragon
- Kill Doctor Lucky
- Knightmare Chess
- Loaded Questions
- Lunch Money
- Mastermind for Kids
- Monty Python and the Holy Grail Collectible Card Game
- Mortal Kombat Kard Game
- Mystery of the Abbey
- Mythos (collectible card game)
- Netrunner (collectible card game)
- Star Trek Collectible Card Game
- Stargrunt II
- Stealth: The Game
- The Very Clever Pipe Game
- The X-Files Collectible Card Game
- XXXenophile (collectible card game)
- Yu-Gi-Oh! Trading Card Game

== Game awards given in 1996 ==
- Origins Awards (for 1995):
  - Best Card Game: Middle-earth: The Wizards
  - Best Fantasy or Science-Fiction Board Game: Dragon Dice
  - Best Graphic Presentation of a Board Game: RoboRally - Armed and Dangerous
  - Best Miniatures Rules: Warzone - A Fast & Furious Miniatures Battle Game
  - Best Modern-Day Board Game: Empire of the Rising Sun
  - Best Pre-20th Century Board Game (tie): Colonial Diplomacy, Three Days of Gettysburg
  - Best Roleplaying Rules: Mage: The Ascension (2nd edition)
  - Adventure Gaming Hall of Fame
    - Axis & Allies
    - Call of Cthulhu RPG
- Games: 25 Words or Less

== Significant game-related events in 1996 ==
- Five Rings Publishing Group formed as a spin-out of Alderac Entertainment Group and ISOMEDIA.
- Looney Labs was founded after the demise of Icehouse Games, Inc.

== Deaths ==
Date	Name	Age	Notability
April 17	Piet Hein	90	Scientist and game designer
July 18	Stephen Donaldson	49	Activist and wargame designer for Simulations Publications, Inc.
December 18	Charles Deaton	75	Architect who designed Gusher (1946)

== See also ==
- 1996 in video gaming
