= Captain Park's Imaginary Polar Expedition =

Board game

- Designers: James Ernest
- Publishers: Cheapass Games
- Publication: 2002

Captain Park's Imaginary Polar Expedition is a board game published by Cheapass Games in 2002 in which players emulate would-be explorers who fake their great adventures.

== Description ==
Captain Park's Imaginary Polar Expedition is a game set in Victorian London for 3 to 7 players. They are members of the London Professional Gentlemen's Club and have discovered that the famous Captain Park, who has just returned from the South Pole to great acclaim from club members, is a fraud who hid in London while supposedly on his expedition. The players all decide to become famous by using the same deception. However, as the players roam around London looking for collectibles to present and hiding for a number of months before returning to their club, Captain Park hears of their plan to emulate his success and seeks to unmask them in their London hiding places.

=== Components ===
The game has a sheet of rules, a deck of 90 cards containing Photos, Facts, Anecdotes, and Heroes; and a 4-section board representing Victorian London.

Players must supply time counters, a pawn for each player plus two extra pawns, and paper and pencil for tracking scores.

=== Setup ===
Each player's pawn starts at the Gentlemen's Club.

=== Gameplay ===
Players visit various locations around London that either allow them to draw cards from the deck, or place cards from their hand on the table in front of them. Each turn, the player collects a time counter representing one month.

A pawn on the board represents Captain Park, who is seeking to uncover their deception. If Park lands on the same square as a player, the player loses all of their time counters.

When a player has collected seven time counters, they can return to the club and present their voyage to the South Pole, China, Everest, Africa, or the Amazon. Any relevant cards in front of the player are scored. The player then returns to the streets of London to collect more cards and present another of their voyages.

=== Victory conditions ===
The first person to reach 200 points is the winner.

=== Strategy ===
Critic Brad Weier pointed out, "While the game has two obvious challenges — avoiding Captain Park and playing lots of cards — it has a long-term strategy as well. Players need to decide if they will make numerous short trips to try and take as many bonus points as possible, or make one or two prolonged sojourns in an effort to score many cards at once."

== Publication history ==
Cheapass Games was founded by James Ernest in 1995 when he had the revelation that most game owners have plenty of dice, counters, play money, and other common board game accessories, so there was no need to bundle all of these components with every game that requires them. The resultant games have only the bare necessities: rules, a board if needed, and proprietary cards or counters. One of these bare-bones games was Captain Park's Imaginary Polar Expedition, designed by Ernest and published in 2002.

== Reception ==
In Pyramid, Brad Weier commented, "One of the most impressive aspects of the game is how tightly integrated its theme is with its rules." But Weier warned, "Some players have complained that the scoring system is too complicated and that it slows the game." Weier concluded, "Captain Park's Imaginary Polar Expedition combines humor, strategy, and a bit of luck in a great package that teaches us it is okay to lie to achieve fame."

In Issue 39 of the French games magazine Backstab, Olivier Collin noted "Based on a brilliant theme, the latest Cheapass Games title is easy to learn and allows you to gather 3 to 7 players for a hilarious game that will last about an hour." Collin warned that "the victory point scoring system is a bit cumbersome, and it would be wise to entrust it to the most experienced player." Collin concluded by giving the game a rating of 4 out of 5, saying, "With its inverted Scotland Yard vibe, this game full of twists and turns is definitely worth a try."

Writing for Spotlight on Games, Rick Heli felt that the artwork was disappointing and a step down in quality from previous Cheapass games such as Witch Trial and Unexploded Cow. Heli also felt that the Captain Park mechanism was too disruptive, writing, "The fact that a player can have his plans and chances, not merely disrupted, but completely devastated [by Captain Park] is the main negative here." Heli suggested, "It is probably also a good idea to keep the number of players down to three or four as Chaos increases rapidly after that." Heli concluded, "Because players need to make some tricky calculations about what an opponent is up to, quite a lot of arithmetic, not really a good fit for the average non-gamer. It can be just a tad long as well. The best match is probably with your usual hardcore gaming friends, but in a more jovial setting like a pub or restaurant."
