= Diceland =

Board game

- Designers: James Ernest; Toivo Rovainen
- Publishers: Cheapass Games
- Players: 2-5
- Setup time: 2 minutes
- Playing time: 20 minutes
- Age range: 10+

Diceland is a tabletop game played with collectible sets of dice designed by Toivo Rovainen and James Ernest and released in 2002 by Cheapass Games. Players roll paper cut-out octahedral dice into a combat arena. The dice are then used in the same way as miniatures - they can be moved around the arena and attack other dice.

The original Diceland set was Diceland: Deep White Sea, released in 2002. It was followed in 2003 by four more sets: Diceland: Ogre, Diceland: Space (two sets, Terrans vs. Urluquai and Garthans vs. Muktians), and Diceland: Extra Space, and in 2005 with Diceland: Cyburg and Diceland: Dragons. There is also a set of Button Men using characters from the Deep White Sea setting. In addition to all of these sets, there are three regular-sized and one oversized promotional dice; the 2005 summer promo die features characters from the webcomic Penny Arcade.

== Awards ==
Diceland won the 2002 Origins Vanguard Award.
