= GameTable Online =

Web game portal

GameTable Online (abbreviated as GTO) was a popular web game portal that specialized in online adaptations of board, card, and dice games. Their game platform offered both head-to-head play against other players or computer opponents for single player mode, including such games are checkers, chess, hearts, and Axis & Allies. There was a mix of free and "Premium" games. The "Premium" games were the most popular, and to play those against other humans required an activation fee per game title.

GameTable Online used Java to launch and play their games. They could be played on Windows, Macintosh, and UNIX computers and required a web browser and the common Java download. The GameTable Online user base was predominantly English-speaking and the website supported no other languages.

== History ==
GameTable Online was founded in 2001 by Joe Minton. As the President of Cyberlore Studios, Minton sought to build a website that focused on tabletop games rather than typical computer games.

In 2003, GameTable Online went public with their first set of 5 games. Since 2003, games have been added gradually. Traffic jumped up significantly when they began hosting a number of games by Wizards of the Coast. These games were developed by GameTable Online for Wizards of the Coast's Gleemax game site in 2007-2008 but by September 2008, Wizards of the Coast abandoned the Gleemax game portal. In the aftermath, GameTable Online adopted the games at their website. The games from this arrangement were Acquire, Axis & Allies, Battle Cry, Guillotine, and Vegas Showdown. In September 2012, GameTable Online opened a second website,rpgtableonline.com. RPG Table Online uses GTO's game technology to host role-playing games via the Internet.

GameTable shut down at the start of New Year's Day 2015.

Both domains (gametableonline.com and rpgtableonline.com) were afterwards bought by (sex) advertising companies - warning for those who'd like to try them.

== Games ==
The games at GameTable Online spanned the range from public domain classic, "beer-and-pretzel" light games, German-style board games to American strategy games. Games that were based on licensed game properties were built with the permission of game publishers and/or designers and were modeled to look their real world counterparts. Despite the strong presence of Wizards of the Coast games, GameTable Online featured games from a variety of publishers.

GameTable Online's game list (at its peak, circa September 24, 2010):

- 10 Days in Africa
- 1960: The Making of the President
- Acquire
- Axis & Allies (Revised and 1942 editions)
- Backgammon
- Battle Cry
- Battle of the Bands (card game)
- Battle for Olympus (game)
- Bosworth
- Checkers
- Chess
- Condottiere
- Cosmic Wimpout
- Creepy Freaks
- Dogfight
- Euphrat & Tigris (also known as Tigris & Euphrates)
- Guillotine
- Hearts (with a "Turbo" version that includes special rules)
- Igel Ärgern
- Kill Dr. Lucky
- Lord of the Fries
- Lost Souls
- New England
- Nuclear War (card game)
- RoboRally
- Tsuro
- Tsuro of the Seas
- Vampire
- Vegas Showdown
