= The Great Brain Robbery (board game) =

Board game

The Great Brain Robbery is a board game designed by James Ernest and released in 2000 by Cheapass Games.

== Gameplay ==
It is a wild west-themed sequel to Give Me the Brain, and the fourth in the Friedey's series of games. Players assume the role of zombies attempting to rob a speeding train full of brains. The game is played on a board made up of train carriages, printed on eight double-sided boards. As the players move forward through the carriages, new ones are added and old ones fall off, giving a varied and changing game board. The Great Brain Robbery was the first board game to come in a sturdy cardboard box. It includes 25 brain cards.

== Reception ==
In 2001, The Great Brain Robbery won the Origins Award for Best Science Fiction or Fantasy Board Game 2000.
