= Fightball =

Card game

- Cover art by Eduardo Müller
- Designers: James Ernest; Mike Selinker
- Illustrators: Eduardo Müller
- Publishers: Cheapass Games
- Players: 2
- Setup time: 5 minutes
- Playing time: 20 minutes
- Chance: Medium
- Skills: Good reflexes Pattern building

Fightball is a real-time card game published by Cheapass Games in 2002 in which the players try to win a futuristic basketball game.

== Description ==
Fightball is a card game for two players, each of whom takes the role of a Coach of one of six teams competing in the fictional futuristic sport of Fightball.

=== Components ===
The game box contains a set of rules as well as two separate decks of 56 cards, one for each player, containing Players, Balls, Shots, Special Effects, and a BUZZ card in each deck. There is also a deck of 24 Field cards in three colors: green, red, and blue.

=== Setup ===
The Field cards are placed on any flat surface in a 5 x 5 grid with the center card missing.

=== Gameplay ===
The game is divided into four quarters. On an agreed upon signal, both participants simultaneously play cards that feature players, balls, shots, and special effects. The goal of the game is to create Complete Plays by forming stacks of specific types of cards. First a Shooter card must be played. A variety of other cards can then be played on the Shooter, but at some point, a Ball must also be played. Finally, a Shot card must be played. The total number of points in the stack must add up to at least 10. If the Shooter, Ball and Shot caards are played in any other order, the stack is invalid.

The opposing player can play defensive blockers on an opposing stack in an attempt to reduce the total points to less than 10.

The last card in each player's deck is the BUZZ card; when either player plays this, the quarter is immediately over. The number of Complete Plays are counted up and recorded, and all cards are returned to their respective decks and shuffled, with the BUZZ card placed on the bottom of the deck again..

The next three quarters are played in an identical fashion.

=== Victory conditions ===
The player who completes the most Complete Plays in four quarters is the winner.

== Publication history ==
Cheapass Games was founded by James Ernest in 1995 when he had the revelation that most game owners have plenty of dice, counters, play money, and other common board game accessories, so there was no need to bundle all of those components into every game that required them. The resultant games have only the bare necessities: rules, a board if needed, and proprietary cards or counters.

The company enjoyed success with two "real time" card games, Falling and Brawl. The third game of this series was Fightball, designed by James Ernest and Mike Selinker, with art by Eduardo Miller. When Fightball was released in 2002, the six Fightball decks were sold in pairs: Aztecs vs. The Dark, The Cruisers vs. Texas Wildcats, and Cavaliers vs. Team Sport. Each individual deck was compatible with and playable against all of the others.

== Reception ==
Andy Vetromile, writing for Pyramid, noted, "it's not easy to keep track of everything. The first few games, players will probably play by taking turns just to get used to the rules; even so, the game is challenging, and you'll end up making a lot of costly mistakes ... The learning curve isn't a huge problem, but it isn't insignificant either, and oversights continue to creep in even after a number of games." Vetromile also warned, "As awkward as the fast round is, the scoring round can be a real bookkeeping nightmare — paper and pencil are highly recommended." Vetromile concluded, "Fightball has imperfections, to be sure, and they aren't nitpicks ... The game may be tiring to play, but it won't get dull anytime soon"

The Polish website Games Fanatic thought the game had its good points, but pointed out many problems including the actual playing surface, writing, "The sprawling playing field makes it impossible to see the entire field at once. The number of events, the need to count (although roughly estimate) points in stacks, and trying to match colors make controlling the game difficult, if not impossible, especially when you also have to keep track of your opponent's actions." The review concluded by encouraging readers to try it.
