= Projective set (disambiguation) =

Projective Set may refer to:

- A set in the Projective hierarchy, a sequence of subsets of a Polish space in descriptive set theory
- Projective Set (game), a 2-dimensional analogue of the award-winning 1991 card game Set
