= Button man =

Button man may refer to:

- Button Man, a story that has appeared in the comics anthology 2000 AD
- Pearly Kings and Queens
- American English slang for a hired killer

== See also ==
- Button Men, a dice game
