= Diceland: Ogre =

Diceland: Ogre is a 2003 tabletop game supplement published by Cheapass Games for Diceland.

== Contents ==
Diceland: Ogre is a supplement in which one 4-inch die represents the Ogre Cybertank, and 16 smaller dice are lesser units.

== Reviews ==
- Pyramid
- Backstab
