= U.S. Patent No. 1 =

Board game designed by Falko Goettsch and James Ernest

This is not U.S. Patent No. 1
- Manufacturers: Cheapass Games
- Designers: Falko Goettsch; James Ernest
- Publication: 2001
- Players: 3 to 6
- Playing time: 60 minutes

U.S. Patent No. 1 is a board game designed by Falko Goettsch & James Ernest, and published by Cheapass Games in 2001. This is indeed not US patent No. 1. That patent was issued and signed by George Washington and Thomas Jefferson for a device to process potash.

== Gameplay ==
Each player's goal is to assemble a complete time machine (requiring a weapon, shield, power source, and chassis), and travel back to the day the U.S. Patent Office opened, so as to secure the first US patent.

The first actual U.S. patent was issued on July 31, 1790, to Samuel Hopkins for the manufacture of potash. The game's cover art states that "if you have a time machine, it doesn't really matter who invented it first. All that matters is who gets to the Patent Office first."

== Reception ==
The game was nominated for the Origins Award for Best Science Fiction or Fantasy Board Game of 2001, but lost to Risk 2210.

== Publication history ==
Cheapass Games no longer supports the game, but has made the complete game available for free download on their "Boulevard of Broken Games" page.

== Reviews ==
- Pyramid
