= Diceland: Space =

Diceland: Space is a 2003 tabletop game supplement published by Cheapass Games for Diceland.

== Contents ==
Diceland: Space is a supplement in which a ship-to-ship combat game uses paper dice as the characters.

== Reviews ==
- Pyramid
- Backstab
