= Esel (disambiguation) =

Wikimedia disambiguation

Esel may refer to:

- eSeL, an art platform in Vienna, Austria
- Bülent Esel (1927–2004), Turkish footballer
- Esel, a peak of Pilatus mountain in Switzerland
- Esel, a variant of card game My ship sails
- E-selectin, or ESEL, a selectin cell adhesion molecule
