= Devil Bunny Hates the Earth =

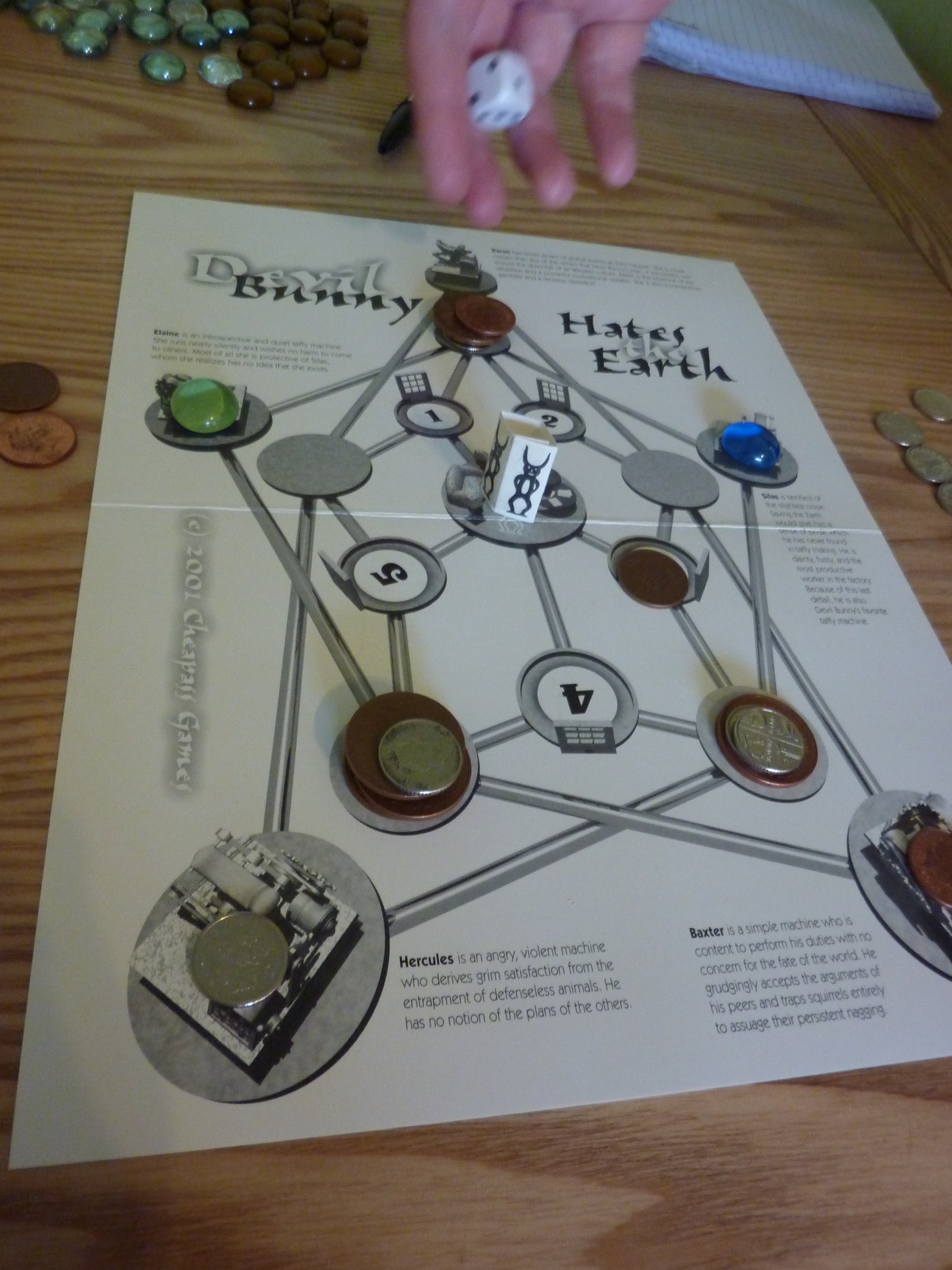
The game being played

Devil Bunny Hates the Earth is a board game for 2-5 players produced by Cheapass Games. According to the plot, Devil Bunny is trying to destroy the earth by making "very unsatisfying" salt water taffy. The players, as the taffy machines, are trying to stop Devil Bunny and save the earth by luring squirrels into their machinery. The gameplay is somewhat similar to mancala. In 2018 Greater than Games reworked the concept to have mechanics more similar to Cheapass Games's Tak or Veritas, retitling it "Devil Bunny versus the Entire Galaxy."

== Details ==
Devil Bunny Hates the Earth was designed by James Ernest and published in 2001. The game takes approximately 20 minutes to play and is suggested for ages 10 and up.

Each player is a taffy pulling machine working in Devil Bunny's taffy factory. Devil Bunny lures cute little squirrels into his factory and get them to do unpleasant tasks. As a taffy machine, you try and put an end to Devil Bunny's plot. It is a difficult task to accomplish as a taffy machine, but Devil Bunny's plot isn't likely to succeed so there is hope.

Each token represents a squirrel, which are distributed in a linear fashion along paths on the board. The squirrels are led into each player's taffy machine. Players roll dice each turn and, depending on the outcome of the dice roll, Devil Bunny may remove tokens from the players' machines.

== Reviews ==
- Backstab #32

== Awards ==
- 2001 Origins Award Nominee: Best Abstract Board Game

== See also ==
- Devil Bunny Needs a Ham
