= Real-time card game =

Type of card game

A real-time card game is a card game in which there are no turns and all players may act simultaneously (that is, in real-time).

The card game Set has a real-time element; in Set, the players are racing to identify patterns in the cards on the table. The concept was also used by James Ernest in his game Falling, and was later expanded in the games Brawl and Fightball.

There are also real-time card games that use a standard deck of 52 playing cards. A large number of real-time card games are in the Slapjack family: players take turns playing cards and then race to "slap" a jack or face card when it is turned up. In this family are Spit, Egyptian Ratscrew, and Nerts.

Another group of real-time card games are related to Spoons, in which players exchange cards asynchronously until one or more players have a certain hand; then the first player to perform a certain action wins. In this family are the 52-card game Pig and Parker Brothers' Chicago Commodities Exchange-themed Pit.

One can also view games like Solitaire and Uno (specifically on the last turn, as real-time per se).
