= Kill Doctor Lucky =

Board game

- Kill Doctor Lucky box cover from Titanic Games
- Designers: James Ernest
- Publishers: Cheapass Games; Titanic Games
- Players: 3 to 7
- Setup time: 5 minutes
- Playing time: 40 minutes

Kill Doctor Lucky is a humorous board game designed by James Ernest and released in 1996 by Cheapass Games. In 1998, Kill Doctor Lucky won the Origins Award for Best Abstract Board Game of 1997.

Kill Doctor Lucky is, in concept, a sort of inversion and perhaps a parody of Cluedo (Clue in North America). Both games are set in a sprawling mansion full of colorfully named rooms, feature a variety of dangerous weapons, and deal with the murder of the mansion's owner. Cluedo begins after the murder has been committed, and players compete to solve it; Kill Doctor Lucky ends with the murder, and players compete to commit it.

In October 2015 a "Deluxe 19.5th Anniversary Edition" with new art and updated game mechanics was launched on Kickstarter.

== Gameplay ==
The gameboard is a floor plan of Doctor Lucky's mansion, and it is accompanied by a deck of cards representing the objects and opportunities that can be found there. Players take turns moving through the rooms of the mansion and accumulating cards, while Doctor Lucky moves through the mansion following a predetermined path. A player may attempt to kill Doctor Lucky by playing a weapon card (such as a runcible spoon, a monkey hand, a letter opener, a trowel, a chainsaw or pinking shears) while the player's token is in the same room as Doctor Lucky and out of sight of all other players. Each weapon card has a certain point value, and certain weapons are worth more points when used in certain rooms (for example, the trowel is worth extra points when used in the wine cellar, an allusion to Poe's "The Cask of Amontillado").

At this point, the player making the murder attempt succeeds, and thereby wins the game, unless the opponents play Failure cards of combined value equal to the value of the weapon used. The situation is complicated by the requirement that players play Failure cards in clockwise order, with each player having only one opportunity to play cards. Since it is to any player's advantage to eliminate failure cards from his opponents' hands, a large part of the strategy of the game consists in bluffing: when one player attacks Doctor Lucky, it is in your interest to persuade your other opponents that you have no failure cards in your hand, to attempt to force them to save the game by spending the required cards.

When played, failure cards are set aside and not returned to the deck. Thus, as the game goes on, fewer and fewer failure cards are in play. This not only builds tension but also forces the game to end in a reasonable amount of time, because once all the failure cards are gone, the next murder attempt cannot fail.

The new Titanic Games version of Kill Doctor Lucky makes two changes to the original rules. First, a minor change was made to game play that now allows everyone to take at least one turn before the Doctor Lucky pawn determines turn order. In the original, it was possible for players to position themselves in such a way as to keep some players from ever getting a turn. This is no longer possible.

The second change was the addition of a new game piece called the "spite token" (a variant in the prior edition). Spite tokens are awarded when a murder attempt fails and adds a bonus point to all future murder attempts. A player also has the option to spend a spite token as a failure point to aid in thwarting an opponent's murder attempt. When spite tokens are spent in this manner they are given to the player they're spent against. This speeds the game up and adds a great deal of strategy to the late game when all of the failure cards have been removed from the deck.

As of the 19.5th Anniversary Edition, several rules have changed. If the deck runs out, the lights go out and line of sight is in-the-same-room only; a player may not draw a card if anyone, including Doctor Lucky, can see them; and hallways and stairs do not count against movement, making the board much smaller.

== Expansions and spinoffs ==
Kill Doctor Lucky: Craigdarroch: An Accessory to Murder (1998)
An expansion board for Kill Doctor Lucky, Craigdarroch depicts Craigdarroch Castle, a mansion in Victoria, British Columbia.
Save Doctor Lucky (2000)
A prequel to Kill Doctor Lucky, Save Doctor Lucky takes place on a sinking ocean liner. Gameplay is similar to Kill Doctor Lucky, except that your goal is to save Doctor Lucky while somebody else is watching. There is also a time limit; if Doctor Lucky is not saved before the ship sinks, everybody loses.
Save Doctor Lucky on Moon Base Copernicus (2002)
A new map for Save Doctor Lucky depicting an "unexplodable" space station. Typically, they called it unexplodable but it's about to go BOOM! The escape pod only has room for two, so, it looks like you'll get into Dr. Lucky's good-books by saving him and taking him back to Earth with you, while the rest of your unfortunate travellers are killed in the explosion.
Kill Doctor Lucky: The Director's Cut (2002)
Contains the original board for "Kill Doctor Lucky" and an unnamed, back-printed second board similar to the Craigdarroch expansion board. The rule booklet for this edition also includes suggested variant rules, including "Kill Doctor Lucky and his Dog" (in this version, one can kill Doctor Lucky's dog in front of him, but not vice versa) and a system for players to try to kill each other (resulting in the killer taking the victim's cards, and the victim going back to the starting space and continuing from there).
Kill Doctor Lucky Online (2004)
A complete, licensed online version of the classic Kill Doctor Lucky game published by GameTable Online. Can be played with live players or against computer opponents.
The Doctor Lucky Ambivalence Pack (2005)
Includes Kill Doctor Lucky Aboard the SS Afgang! and Save Doctor Lucky from the Hotel DuBois! expansion boards.
Kill Doctor Lucky (2006)
A new full-color deluxe edition, including mounted board, cards, pawns, rules, and the new spite tokens published by Titanic Games.
Kill Doctor Lucky and His Little Dog, Too! (2007)
Expansion set from Titanic Games for the above game. Adds a token for Shamrock, the Doctor's dog, and expansion rules.
Get Lucky (2013)
Card game version from Cheapass Games. Published through Kickstarter.
The Secret Lair of Doctor Lucky (2016)
An expansion board for the 19.5th Edition illustrated in the same style as Before I Kill You, Mr. Spy. Rules Twist: You must be seen killing Doctor Lucky.
Dr. Lucky's Mansion that is Haunted (2017)
An expansion board for the 19.5th Edition based on the concept of Dr. Lucky's mansion being haunted, dodgingly renamed to avoid another 'Spy Game' incident. Rules Twist: You play ghosts and move through the walls.
The Island of Doctor Lucky (2018)
A stand-alone reimplementation. You can still attempt murder the old fashioned way, using a weapon when no one can see you, or you can take advantage of the new hazard cards to hit him from anywhere else on the map. While hazards aren't usually as strong as a murder attempt, they give you faster movement for the rest of the game. What's more, you can also throw hazards at players.
Button Men: Dr. Lucky's Murderers (2018)
A Button Men set featuring Dr. Lucky and several potential murders. Introduces the Luck Die skill and the 19.5 sized die.

== Other notes ==
- The Failure-card mechanic is a prime example of the game theory concept of the prisoner's dilemma, to the extent that it has become known among many gamers as "Kill Doctor Lucky Syndrome".
- The Craigdarroch expansion to the game was unavailable for a brief time after the current owners of the castle objected to the use of the estate's name and floor plan without permission. The expansion is now available in an edited form as part of Kill Doctor Lucky: The Director's Cut (2002). (A similar debate caused Cheapass Games to repackage their game Before I Kill You, Mr. Bond as James Ernest's Totally Renamed Spy Game.)
- Kill Doctor Lucky is also featured on The Cheapass Album by Beatnik Turtle.

== Reviews ==
- Backstab #15
- Family Games: The 100 Best
- Pyramid (Issue 26 - Jul 1997)
