= Blood Dawn =

Tabletop role-playing game

- Cover
- Designers: Lawrence R. Sims
- Publishers: Optimus Design Systems (1996-1998); SSDC, Inc. (1999-present)
- Publication: 1996 (1st edition)
- Genres: Science fiction, Post-Apocalyptic
- Systems: Custom

Blood Dawn is a cyberpunk role-playing game designed by Lawrence R. Sims and first published by Optimus Design Systems in 1996.

== History ==
Optimus Design Systems (ODS) published the Blood Dawn RPG as a 240-page softcover book in 1996. Three years later, ODS sold the Blood Dawn license to SSDC, Inc.

== Gameplay ==
This cyberpunk roleplaying game is set in a post-apocalyptic alternate 21st century timeline on Earth. Characters can play "normal" humans or mutants. Character creation uses a "point buy" system: players must distribute 130 ability points between Strength, Manual Dexterity, IQ, Agility, Constitution, Guts, Intuition and Charisma. The player then spends 2000 skill points on skills such as animal husbandry or weather prediction. (If the character is a mage, the player must spend at least 750 of these skill points on spells.) Any leftover skill points can be spent on armor, weapons and equipment.

Action resolution compares the difficulty rating of a task with the character's relevant ability. The player must roll a 20-sided dice below the difference between ability and difficulty.

Magic uses a point-spend system: mages can cast spells by spending points from a renewable pool, with greater spells requiring more points. Once the mage is out of spell points, the mage must wait until spell points renew in order to cast more spells.

== Reception ==
Andy Butcher reviewed Blood Dawn for Arcane magazine, rating it a 5 out of 10 overall, and stated that "I must admit to enjoying Blood Dawn. If you're prepared to do a fair amount of work, there's a playable system with an interesting background hiding somewhere in this book. Unfortunately, that's not good enough for a published roleplaying system these days."

In the July 1997 edition of Dragon (Issue 237), Rick Swan thought that Blood Dawn was "ambitious but unfocused, lurching between cynicism and whimsy... But though Blood Dawn is kind of a mess, it’s a fascinating mess, rife with possibility for players willing to sift the gems from the junk." Swan found the character creation system a snap; he was also intrigued by the available pregenerated characters. He found the action resolution system quite simple, and also liked the flexibility of the magic system. But he found the combat system "burdened with a host of variables and nitpicky calculations... All this clutter, I guess, is supposed to enhance realism. But it just made me reach for the aspirin." Swan also criticized the game setting, calling it "your standard Kentucky Fried Earth." Swan criticized the lack of background detail, which he felt would not get a campaign started. "There’s no suitable home base for the PCs. There aren’t any maps. There are a handful of adventure hooks, but no complete scenarios." He concluded with an ambivalent recommendation: "The upside: solid characters, interesting magic system, good presentation. The downside: clunky combat mechanics, sketchy game world, no developed adventures. The verdict: a qualified thumbs up."

== Reviews ==
- Shadis #26 (April, 1996)
