= Devil Bunny Needs a Ham =

Board game

- Designers: James Ernest
- Publishers: Cheapass Games
- Players: 2 to 5
- Setup time: 2 minutes
- Playing time: 5-10 minutes
- Chance: High
- Skills: Low

Devil Bunny Needs a Ham is a board game by Cheapass Games for 2-4 players. In the game, sous-chefs (represented by the player) try to climb up a building while Devil Bunny attempts to knock them off in the mistaken belief that doing so will get him a ham.

== Gameplay ==
The game board is a rectangular grid representing the side of a building, with the starting space at the bottom, and the goal at the top. There is a dotted line near the top that represents a critical height (see below). Furthermore, there are special spaces on the sides of the buildings that represent "fear" that cannot be moved into (As a show of Cheapass Games' signature humor, these fears included "spiders" and "Wesley Snipes.")

In the basic game, each player controls two sous-chefs; on each turn, the player rolls two six-sided dice. Any roll other than a 6 can be used to move one or both sous-chefs up the side of the building, either horizontally or on upwards diagonals (a player cannot voluntarily move down the building). If a 6 is rolled, the Devil Bunny token is moved to the highest sous-chef on the board and knocks him off; if there is a sous-chef vertically below the one that was knocked off, the player controlling that one will catch the falling sous-chef, placing the token in the spaces immediately below him. If no player is able to catch the sous chef, the chef will crash to the ground. If the chef fell from a height below the marked line on the board, the chef is safe but must restart him climb back from the start. However, if the chef was above this line, the chef is dead, leaving the player with one fewer token to win. The players earn points for the order in which their chefs arrive at the top, and the weighting is such that a player with second and third-place chefs can beat a player with a first-place and a dead (non-scoring) chef.

Variants include ignoring the effects of the fear spaces (which normally cluster the players into the center columns), and using 3 sous-chef tokens for each player.

The original printing of the game included, in addition to the game board, a small piece of cardboard that folded up into a playing piece to mark the location of Devil Bunny on the board. This was a distinct variation from Cheapass Games' usual design philosophy, where the company only provided components that were uniquely necessary to the game (boards, specific cards, etc.), and had the game's owner provide the rest (player pieces, money, dice, and so on).

A PDF version of the game is available through the current Cheapass Games website: http://www.cheapass.com/

== Reception ==
Scott D. Haring reviewed Devil Bunny Needs a Ham for the online second volume of Pyramid and stated that "There's strategy and luck and people falling off of tall buildings and a character named Devil Bunny. What more do you want for $2.00?"

== See also ==
- Devil Bunny Hates the Earth
