= Safari Jack =

1998 board game

Safari Jack is a 1998 board game published by Cheapass Games.

== Gameplay ==
Safari Jack is a game in which the players use cards to create a safari landscape and then hunt the animals that live there.

== Reception ==
The online second version of Pyramid reviewed Safari Jack and commented that "It's a clever, simple design with lots of replay value, lots of animals with silly names, and enough strategy to keep most gamers interested until they break out, well, probably some other Cheapass game."

== Reviews ==
- Backstab #12
