= Independence Day (adventure) =

1996 book

- Author: Chris Snyder and Matt Forbeck
- Publication date: 1996

Independence Day is a 1996 role-playing game supplement written by Chris Snyder and Matt Forbeck. and published by Pinnacle Entertainment Group for Deadlands in its Dime Novels series (which combined short stories with a playable adventure for the players).

== Contents ==
Undead gunslinger Ronan Lynch is hired by Wyatt Earp and Batt Masterton to keep the peace in Dodge City on the Fourth of July.

== Reception ==
=== Reviews ===
Michał Nowakowski reviewed the Polish translation of the adventure (Dzień niepodległości) for Świat Gier Komputerowych. The introductory story is praised for effectively establishing the atmosphere of the setting and for serving as one of several possible narrative paths leading into the main scenario, while also expanding the game master's understanding of the Deadlands world. The main adventure is set in Dodge City shortly before Independence Day, a moment of heightened tension due to the ongoing conflict between Union and Confederate sympathizers in the disputed territories. Players take on the roles of deputy lawmen working under Wyatt Earp, only to discover that their task is far more complex than it initially appears. The scenario blends classic western tropes—gunfights, saloon brawls, and outlaw gangs—with hallmark Deadlands elements such as supernatural murders, Texas Rangers hunting occult threats, and the political struggle between North and South. The reviewer praises the concept of the Dime Novels line as accessible and engaging, describing Independence Day as an easy-to-run yet exciting adventure suitable for both novice and experienced role-players. Overall, the reviewer regardeds the supplement as a strong and commendable release that successfully captures the tone of the Weird West.

=== Awards ===
The book won Best Roleplaying Adventure of 1997 at 1997 Origins Awards.
