= Shadowrun: The Trading Card Game =

Collectible card game

- Card back to the Shadowrun TCG.
- Designers: Mike Nielsen
- Publishers: FASA Corporation
- Publication: August 1997; 29 years ago
- Players: 2+
- Playing time: Approx 1–2 hours
- Chance: Some
- Age range: 12+
- Skills: Card playing Arithmetic; Basic Reading Ability

Shadowrun: The Trading Card Game is an out-of-print collectible card game, released by FASA in August 1997 as a spin-off from FASA Corporation's Shadowrun role-playing game and used the same scenario, a cyberpunk setting with fantasy elements – an apocalyptic near-future Earth, with advanced technology (bio-engineering, robotics, virtual reality) which was also populated by magic and supernatural beings such as elves and dragons.

== Gameplay ==
Each player assumes the role of a "shadowrunning" group, enlisting mercenaries with several different skills, and acquiring equipment, contacts, technology or mystical items to complete several types of missions.

== History ==
There are only two sets released for the game. The base set, simply titled Shadowrun, and one expansion set, Underworld, which focuses on the criminals, such as Mafia and Yakuza, and the police that tried to bring them down. Despite its initial success and awards, no further expansions for the game were released.

The Underworld set consisted of 141 cards sold in 15-card booster packs and was released in March 1998. It introduced the four factions Gangers, Lone Star, Mafia, and Yakuza.

=== Canceled sets ===
A second printing of the base set, called Second Running replaced 39 cards and changed the art for 12 more. This edition also updated the text for clarity and clarified some rules. The set was ultimately canceled in October 1998.

A 90-card expansion set Corp War was planned for release in July 1998 to be sold in 15-card booster packs. It was later postponed to 1999, then ultimately canceled.

=== Translations ===
The game was translated to Polish (in 1997).

== Reception ==
Shadowrun: The Trading Card Game won the 1997 Origins Awards in the categories "Best Trading Card Game of 1997" and "Best Graphic Presentation of a Card Game of 1997".

== Reviews ==
- Backstab No. 5
- Backstab #9 (Underworld)
- Coleção Dragão Brasil
- Świat Gier Komputerowych #58 (Polish)
