= Lord of the Fries (card game) =

Front cover

Lord of the Fries is a card game created by James Ernest and published by Cheapass Games and Steve Jackson Games. In 2008, Steve Jackson Games released a new edition with revised game components. In 2015, Cheapass Games released a fourth edition and four expansion decks. Lord of the Fries takes place at Friedey's: The Fast Food Restaurant of the Damned. Other games that take place there include Give Me the Brain and Change!.

== Gameplay ==
Lord of the Fries is set in the kitchen of Friedey's where the player's main task is to create meals using different food cards to earn points and get rid of cards. The meals are taken from various menus including those of Ratherbee's Steakhouse, Ghicciaroni's, Friedey's Restaurant, Friedey's Long Wok, Love's Labours Lunch, and the Holiday Menu. Players combine meals with humorous names like Chickacheezabunga, Sheep wit' da Fishes, Lying Dead on the Floor, Manifest Destiny, Penne for Your Tots, Synaptic Relay Deteriorator, An Unbearable Likeness of Beans, Godfather, Bovine Spongiform Yum, Yum, Yum!, the enormous Magna Carta with a side of fries, and the Lord of the Fries.

In 2015, the game was relaunched in a fourth edition with the first printings having a bonus deck from "McFrye's Coffee Shop." Four expansions are available, with more designed and not yet released: "Long Wok on Short Pier," "Las Cabezas," "McPubian's," and "Ghicciaroni's," each with different decks and different restaurant themes.

== Awards ==
Lord of the Fries was in the Games magazine Games 100 list of 2003.

== Reviews ==
- Backstab #12
- Rue Morgue #82
