= Filthy Rich (game) =

Card game which simulates advertising

The 3-D game of capitalism
- Designers: Richard Garfield
- Publishers: Wizards of the Coast
- Players: 2-5
- Setup time: Approx. 5 minutes
- Playing time: 45 minutes
- Chance: Card drawing, Dice rolling
- Age range: 14-Adult
- Skills: Card playing, resource management

Filthy Rich is a card game designed by Richard Garfield and published by Wizards of the Coast in 1998. The game uses a binder with 4 Ultra Pro 9-pocket card sleeves to simulate an advertising space. Players place ads, represented by cards, in the pockets, covering up those underneath.

== Gameplay ==
The object of the game is to purchase 3 cards from the luxury deck. These represent various status symbols, such as “Trophy Wife" (in later editions, "Trophy Spouse"), “Title of Nobility”, or “Space Shuttle”. Each luxury is progressively more expensive, and thus especially in games with multiple players, harder to obtain. Other than their role in winning the game, luxuries confer no benefit to the player, and cost the player money whenever taxes are collected.

On a player’s turn, they must play two cards from their hand. Cards may be Action cards (“IRS Audit,” “Business Scout”) which allow the player to take a one-time action, Asset cards (“Yakuza Loan,” “Protection Racket’), which benefit the player for the rest of the game, or Business cards (“Sven's Swedish Tacos,” “Chapter 11 Books”), which allow players to place a banner (between 1 and 4 cards) in the card sleeve.

The player then rolls a 10-sided die. The numbers 1-9 correspond to the 9 slots in the card sleeve. Any visible ad in that numbered slot pays money to its owner. If a 0 is rolled, all players must pay taxes on their businesses, assets and luxury cards.

The player then rolls a 6-sided die. The numbers 1-4 correspond to the 4 pages of cards sleeves and the pages are turned to the corresponding number. A 5 or 6 result means that the page is not changed.

The player then draws two cards and the next player becomes active.

== Reviews ==
- InQuest Gamer #43
- The Comics Buyer's Guide
