= Unexploded Cow =

Card game

Unexploded Cows
- Cover art by Cheyenne Wright
- Designers: James Ernest; Paul Peterson
- Illustrators: Cheyenne Wright; Mike O'Connor
- Publishers: Cheapass Games
- Publication: 2001

Unexploded Cow is a card game published by Cheapass Games in 2001 in which players try to blow up unexploded bombs in France with mad cows from Britain, earning money in the process.

== Description ==
Unexploded Cow points out that in 1997, England had a problem with "mad cow disease" and France had a problem with unexploded ordinance from World War I. Players try to solve both problems at once by driving herds of cattle into French fields littered with unexploded shells.

=== Components ===
The game has 4 pages of rules and two decks of cards: 12 "City" cards valued 1 through 12; and a 69-card "Cow" and "Event" deck. Each Cow has two monetary values: a Price and the Reward.

Players must supply a six-sided die and $2000 of play money for each player in the game.

=== Setup ===
Each player is given $2000 and is dealt three cards from the Cows/Events deck. Before the game begins, each player must ante $200 into the pot. The top card of the City deck is turned over.

=== Gameplay ===
The space in front of each player is called their "field". When Cow cards are played, they are placed face-up in a line in a player's field.

At the start of a player's turn, if there is no face-up City card, the player turns over the top card of the City deck. The player then Draws, Plays and Rolls.

- Draw cards: The player draws two cards from the Cow/Event deck.
- Play cards: The player plays as many cards from their hand as desired.
  - Cow card: The active player can place a cow card in any player's field, including their own. The owner of the field must then pay the Price of the Cow into the pot. Generally, 'good' cows, which earn money when they explode, are played into the active player's own field, while 'bad' cows, which cost a player money when they explode, are usually played into other players' herds.
    - The active player may also rearrange the order of the Cows in their own field.
  - Event card: The active player must pay the price of the card in order to play it. Each card describes its Event, which takes place immediately.
- Bomb Roll: The active player makes a bomb die roll. After rolling, the active player starts with the rightmost Cow in their own field and counts that number of cows to the left. If the number is greater than the number of cows in the active player's field, then the player keeps counting into their neighbor's field to the left, and onward if necessary. Example: The active player has three cows and rolls a 5. Starting with their righthand Cow, the player counts their three Cows, then continues with the neighbor to the left, who has one Cow, and then on to the first Cow of the next neighbor to the left.
  - Whatever Cow is indicated by the die roll has found an unexploded shell and explodes. The owner of that field gets the Cow's Reward money from the pot, except if the Cow had a negative Reward value, in which case, the owning player must pay that amount into the pot.
  - If a player blows up their own Cow on their on turn, they collect the current face-up City card, collect the reward indicated and follow any other instructions..

=== Strategy ===
Critic Matthew Pook noted, "The strategy behind Unexploded Cow is quite complex for a simple card game. Players try to seed their own fields with the more valuable cows, but other fields with cheaper ones, which can still boost the money in the Pot. Of course, the expensive cows can be stolen, offsetting this strategy."

=== Victory conditions ===
When the last City card is obtained, the player with the most money is the winner.

== Second edition (2013) ==
The second edition makes several changes to the rules:

- Players start with €5000, and ante up €500 at the start of the game.
- On a roll of 6, the active player passes the die to the player on their left, who then makes a Bomb Roll.
- When the last City card is taken, Sudden Death begins. The player with the highest City card total makes a Bomb Roll, followed by the player with the second highest City card total, and then the player with the third highest City card total. This continues until all the Cows on the table have been exploded. Only then is money counted to determine a winner.

== Publication history ==
Cheapass Games was founded by James Ernest in 1995 when he had the revelation that most game owners have plenty of dice, counters, play money, and other common board game accessories, so there was no need to bundle all of these components with every game that requires them. The resultant games have only the bare necessities: rules, a board if needed, and proprietary cards or counters. One of these bare-bones games was Exploding Cow, designed by James Ernest and Paul Peterson, with art by Mike O'Connor, and released in an envelope in 2001.

Cheapass Games went into hiatus in the 2000s, but started republishing some of their more popular titles in 2013. The first to be re-released was Unexploded Cow, published as a boxed set with cover art by Cheyenne Wright.

== Reception ==
In Pyramid, Matthew Pook commented "Unexploded Cow is not quite so much fun as the previous two Cheapass Games (Witch Trial and Great Brain Robbery), and having to find $2000 real or otherwise per player is something of a chore."

In Issue 32 of the French games magazine Backstab, Olivier Collin thought the game lacked replayability, writing that it was "A game with an interesting theme, which makes for a good evening. However, it does eventually get boring."
