= Falling (game) =

1998 card game

Falling is a real-time card game from James Ernest in which all players are falling from the sky for no apparent reason. The object of the game is to hit the ground last. As the box copy says, "It's not much of a goal, but it's all you could think of on the way down."

== Gameplay ==
The game has an uncommon element in card games, in that one player is a dealer whose only role is to smoothly pass out cards in front of the other player. All players may play cards simultaneously, as in other real-time games like Brawl and Fightball. A game takes about a minute to play before everyone hits the ground with predictable results.

The players receive stacks of cards, and try to cope with them as quickly and accurately as they can. At any time, a player may take the top card from any stack belonging to him or her, and then must play it before doing anything else. Some cards are called riders, and can be played on oneself or any other player (except the dealer). These have effects such as creating an extra pile in front of a player, or giving a player an extra card when the dealer gets to him or her. Other cards cancel or move the effects of riders between players. When encountering riders, the dealer immediately removes them and implements their effects, then moves to the next player.

On the bottom of the deck are five Ground cards: when a player get a Ground card, he or she is out, and the last player to hit the Ground wins.

== Reception ==
The reviewer from the online second volume of Pyramid stated that "Once again, Cheapass Games has scored a winner with their new game, Falling."

== Reviews ==
- Backstab #11
