= My ship sails =

English card game

- English children's card game
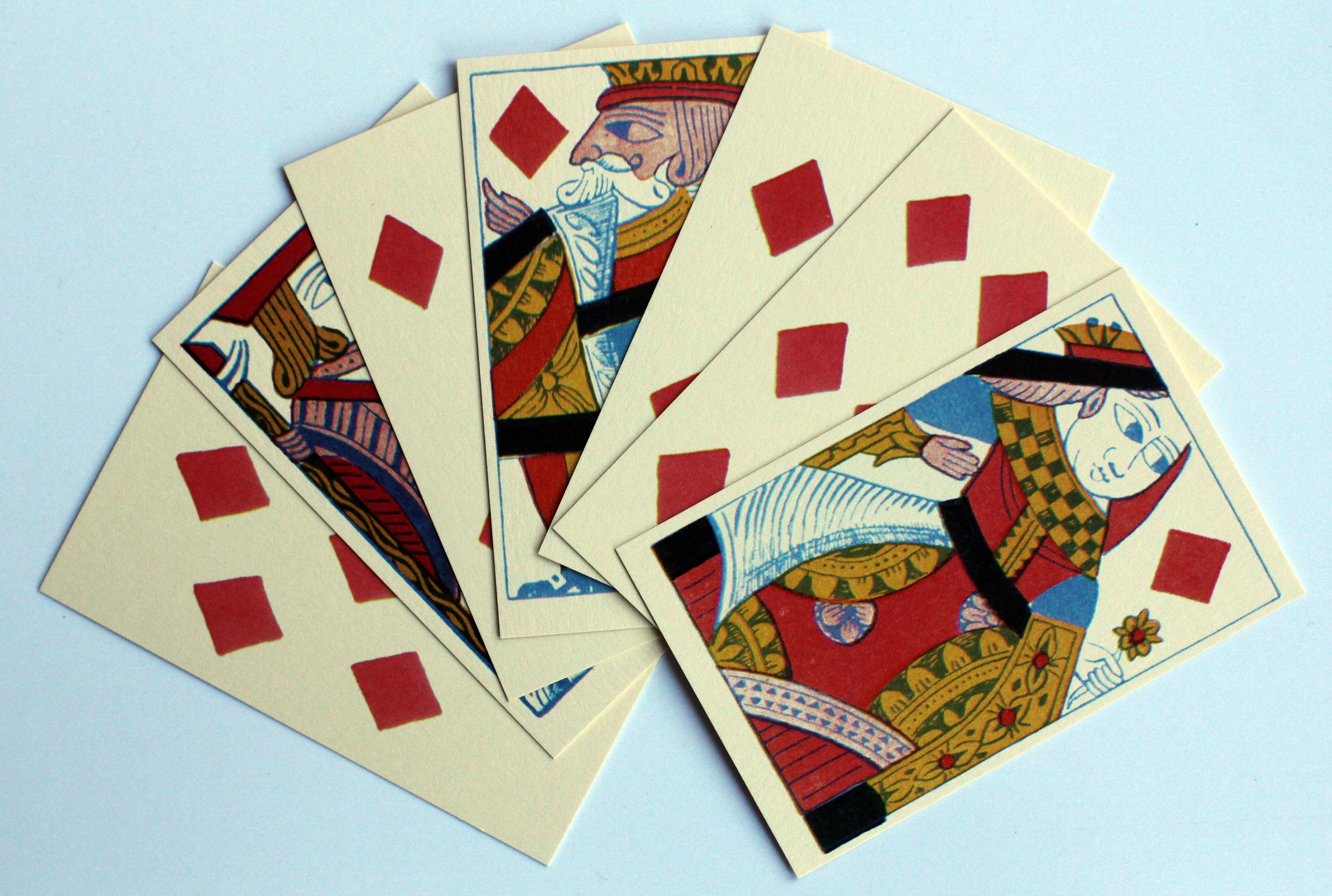
- "Wizzy, wizzy, wee!"
- Type: Collecting
- Players: 4
- Age range: 5+
- Deck: French pack
- Play: clockwise
- Playing time: 5-10 minutes
- Chance: Easy

Related games
- Ochse, leg dich!

My ship sails, also called my bird sings, is an English card game for children that is played with a 52-card French-suited pack in which the aim is to collect a hand of cards in one suit.

== History and names ==
My ship sails appears related to the 17th-century gambling game, my sow's pigg'd, which is mentioned by John Taylor the "Water Poet" in a 1630 poem.

The rules of a three-card version called whehee appear in Francis Willughby's Book of Plaies, written between 1665 and 1670. This may be the origin of a form of my ship sails that appeared in 19th century Shropshire and was called wizzy, wizzy, wee. The aim was to be first to collect a hand of cards of the same suit, each time saying "Change a card for a card, wizzy, wizzy, wee!", the first to do so throwing the cards down on the table and exclaiming "My sow's pigged!"

== Whehee ==
Each player is dealt 3 cards in one go. A player with all three of the same suit is 'whehee' and wins; if two have whehee, the eldest (first in clockwise order after the dealer) wins. If none has whehee, eldest exchanges a card with second hand, second with third and so on round to the dealer. If still no-one has whehee to the left.

== My ship sails ==
My ship sails may be played by four to seven players with a 52-card French-suited pack. The aim of the game is to be the first player to collect seven cards all of one suit.

Each player is dealt 7 cards and the rest are set aside. Players pick up their hands and each discards one card to the table. When everyone has done that, each player picks up the discard on his right, which becomes part of his hand. The first player to collect 7 cards of the same suit, says "my ship sails" and lays his or her cards, face up, on the table. If two players go out simultaneously, there are two options for deciding the winner: either the first player to say "my ship sails" wins or the player with the highest ranking card wins.

== Ochse, leg dich! ==
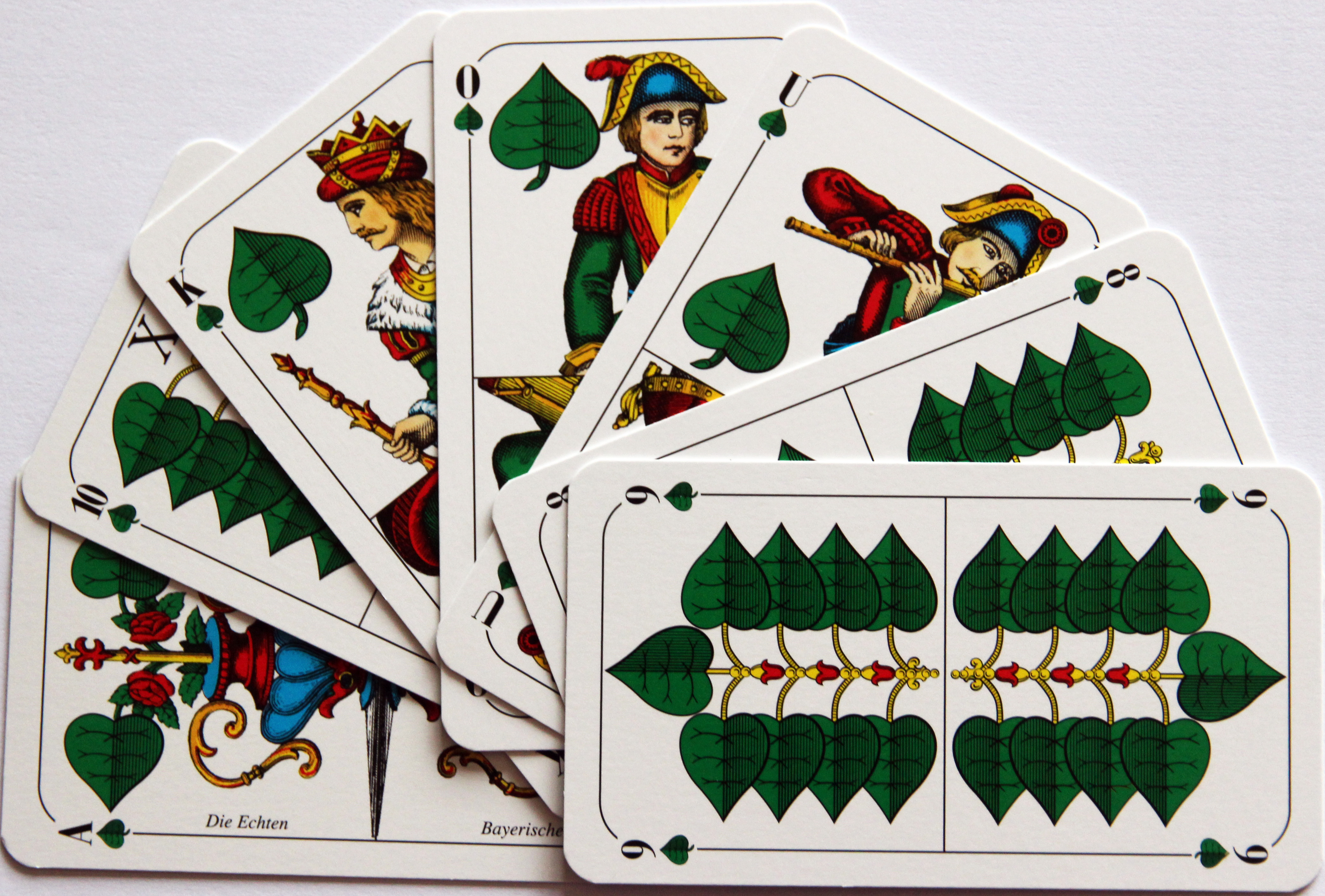
"Ochse, leg dich!" ("Ox, lie down!")

Ochse, leg dich! ("Ox, lie down!") is a German and Austrian variant played with 32 French or German cards (skat pack). It is a simple, family card game that is often played with children and is useful for learning the card values and card suits. It was popular with the German-speaking population of South Bohemia prior to their expulsion after the Second World War, and was known there as Ox, liach de!

The aim of the game is to collect all eight cards of one suit. Dealer deals 8 cards to each of the four players. Forehand leads by passing a card of his choice to the player on his left – middlehand. Middlehand then passes a card to rearhand and so on in clockwise order. Play continues in this way until a player has collected all eight cards of one suit in his hand, whereupon he lays them face up on the table and declares "Ochse, leg dich!" or "Ox, lie down!"

The winner then receives as many chips or gaming counters from each other player as that player has fallen short in collecting eight cards of the same suit. For example, if a player has only collected five cards of one suit, he pays 3 chips to the winner.

Among Danube Swabians the game was called Esel ("donkey") and a player called "Esel" on going out. The last player to lay cards down cards was the Esel and became the next dealer.

== Speculation/matrimony ==
In 1831, Eliza Leslie describes a game for girls which she calls speculation or matrimony that is essentially my ship sails with a full pack of 52 cards. After cutting for first deal (highest wins, Aces high), the cards are shuffled, cut and then fully dealt out. The aim is to be first to collect a full suit of 13 cards. The player to the left of the dealer passes a card she does not want, face down, to her left-hand neighbour. This continues in turn and the first player with 13 cards in suit lays them down and is the winner. This game is unrelated to the gambling game of the same name.

== See also ==
- Pig (card game)

== Literature ==
- Cavendish (1875). Round Games at Cards. London: de la Rue.
- Gööck, Roland (1967). Freude am Kartenspiel, Bertelsmann, Gütersloh
- Jackson, Georgina Frederica (1883). Shropshire Folk-Lore: A Sheaf of Gleanings, Vol. 3. ed. by Charlotte Sophia Burne. London: Trübner.
- Leslie, Eliza (1831). The American Girl's Book. Boston: Munroe & Francis; NY: C.S. Francis.
- Parlett, David (1991). A History of Card Games, OUP, Oxford. ISBN 0-19-282905-X
- Parlett, David (2008). The Penguin Book of Card Games, Penguin, London. ISBN 978-0-141-03787-5
- Taylor, John (1630). Motto.
- Willughby, Francis. A Volume of Plaies. (Manuscript in the Middleton collection, University of Nottingham, shelfmark Li 113.) c1665-70.
