= Set (card game) =

Pattern-finding real-time card game

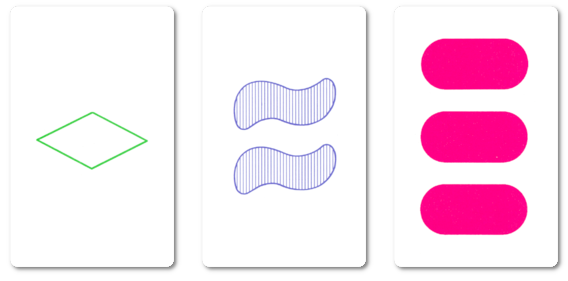
- Three cards from a Set deck. These cards each have a unique number, symbol, shading, and color, and are thus a "set".
- Type: Real-time
- Players: 1+
- Skills: Visualization, logical reasoning, ability to focus
- Age range: 6 years +
- Cards: 81

Set (stylized as SET or SET!) is a real-time card game designed by Marsha Falco in 1974 and published by Set Enterprises in 1991. The deck consists of 81 cards, each varying across four features: number of shapes (one, two, or three), shape (diamond, squiggle, or oval), shading (solid, striped, or open), and color (red, green, or purple). Each possible combination of features (for example, a card with three striped green diamonds) appears only once in the deck.

== Gameplay ==
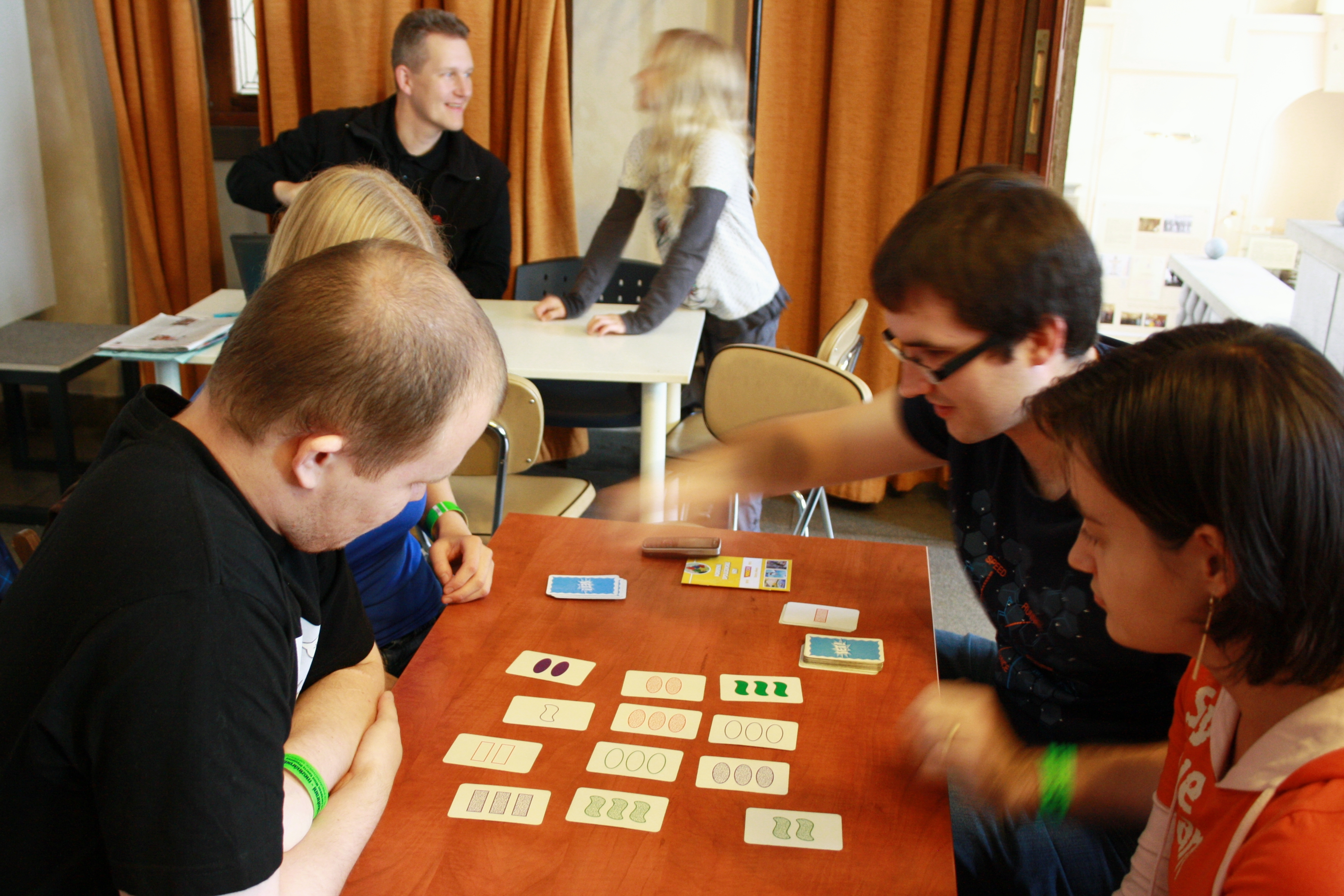
Playing Set

Players race to identify sets of cards. A set consists of three cards in which each of the four features—color, number, shape, and shading—is either (a) the same across all three cards, or (b) different across all three cards. For example, three solid red diamonds, two solid green squiggles, and one solid purple oval form a set, because the shading is the same across all three cards while the number, color, and shape each differ. Given any two cards from the deck, there is exactly one other card that completes a set with them.

In the standard Set game, the dealer lays out cards on the table until either twelve are down or a player spots a set and calls "Set!" The player who calls "Set" takes those three cards, and the dealer deals more cards until twelve are again on the table. (Calling "Set" without being able to point to a valid one quickly enough incurs a penalty.) There may be no set among the twelve cards on the table; in that case, the dealer deals three more to make fifteen, and continues in increments of three as needed. This process of dealing and finding sets continues until the deck is exhausted and no sets remain on the table, at which point whoever has collected the most sets wins.

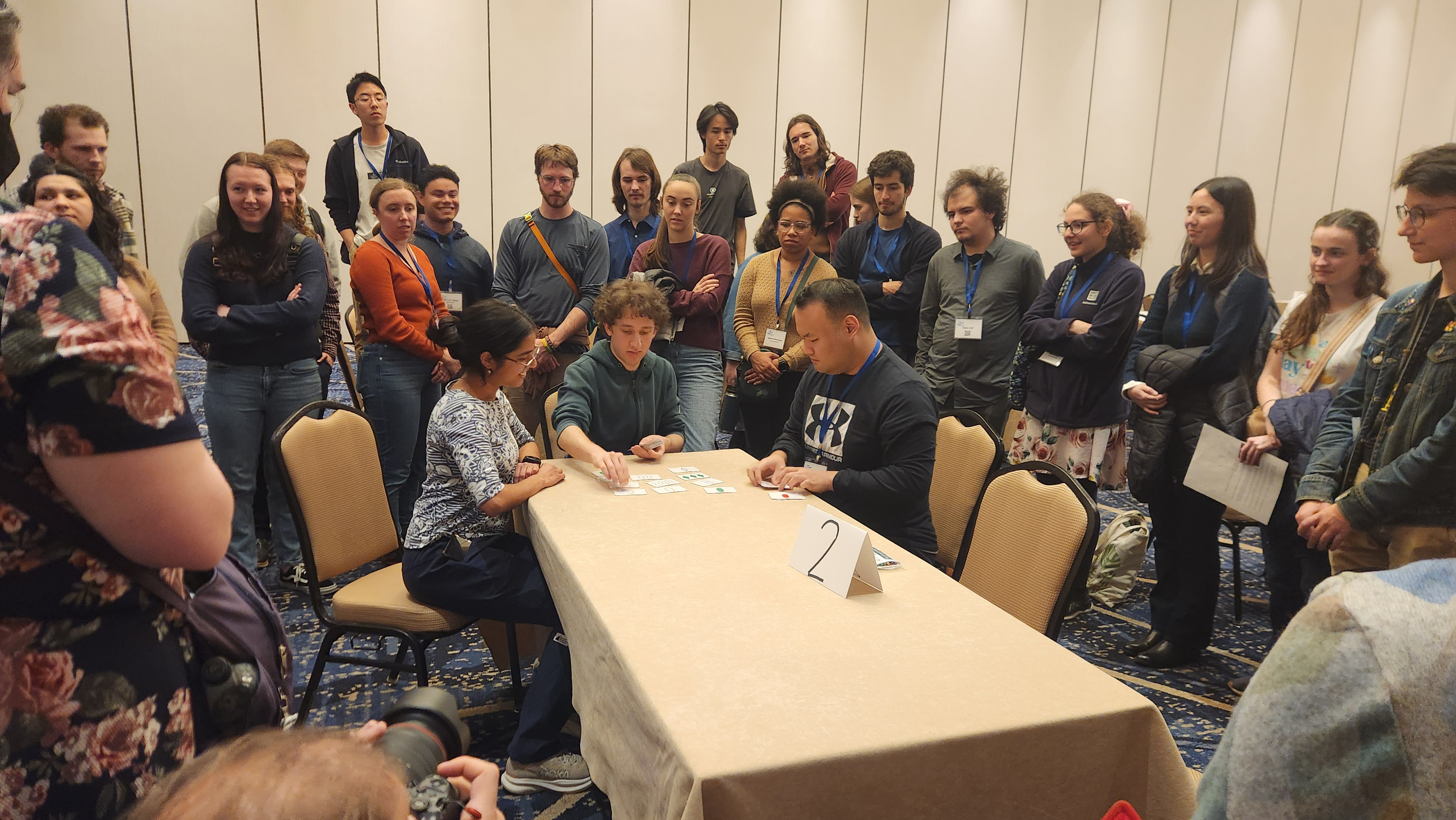
The final round of the First Annual National Set Championship.

Variants included with the Set game use different mechanics for finding sets and different forms of player interaction, and additional variants continue to be created by enthusiasts of the game.

== History ==
The game grew out of a coding system that Marsha Falco devised for her work as a geneticist. Its shapes are based on those in ISO 5807. Set won the Mensa Select award given by American Mensa in 1991 and placed 9th in the 1995 Deutscher Spiele Preis.

The inaugural Set Championship was held on January 8, 2025, at the Joint Mathematics Meeting in Seattle, Washington. About 150 players competed, and Taiki Aiba won first prize: a customized boxing-style belt. In 2026, the tournament moved to Washington, D.C., where first prize went to Anders Olsen.

== Basic combinatorics of Set ==
The 81 cards of a Set deck

- Given any two cards, there is exactly one card that forms a set with those two. Consequently, the probability of producing a set from three randomly drawn cards is 1/79.
- A cap set is a mathematical structure describing a Set layout containing no set at all. The largest number of cards that can be assembled without forming a set is 20, a bound proven in 1971 (cap sets were studied well before the game existed). A maximal cap set of this size is called a maximum cap set (sequence A090245 in the OEIS). Donald Knuth found in 2001 that there are 682,344 such cap sets of size 20 for the 81-card version of Set; under affine transformations on 4-dimensional finite space, they all reduce to essentially one cap set.
- There are $\textstyle\frac{{81 \choose 2}}{3} = \frac{81 \times 80}{2 \times 3} = 1080$ unique sets.
- The probability that a set has $d$ features that differ and $4 - d$ that match is $\textstyle\frac{{4 \choose d}2^d}{80}$. (The case $d = 0$ is impossible, since no two cards are identical.) Thus, 10% of possible sets differ in one feature, 30% in two features, 40% in three features, and 20% in all four.
- The number of distinct 12-card deals is $\textstyle{81 \choose 12} = \frac{81!}{12! 69!} = 70\,724\,320\,184\,700 \approx 7.07 \times 10^{13}$.
- The odds against there being no set among 12 cards start at 30:1 in the first round of play. They fall quickly, settling to roughly 14:1 by about the fourth round and drifting toward 13:1 over the next twenty rounds—so for most of a game, the odds sit between 14:1 and 13:1.
- The odds against there being no set among 15 cards when playing a game are 88:1. (This differs from the odds against no set appearing in any 15 cards, which is 2700:1, since during play 15 cards are shown only after a group of 12 has already failed to yield one.)
- About 30% of games always find a set among the first 12 cards dealt, and so never need to expand to 15.
- The maximum number of sets obtainable from 12 cards is 14.
- The average number of available sets among 12 cards is $\textstyle{12 \choose 3} \cdot \frac{1}{79} \approx 2.78$, and among 15 cards, $\textstyle{15 \choose 3} \cdot \frac{1}{79} \approx 5.76$—though in actual play the numbers run lower.
- If 26 sets have already been taken from the deck, the three remaining cards are guaranteed to form a 27th set.

== Complexity ==
Using a natural generalization of Set, in which the number of properties and values is allowed to vary, it has been shown that determining whether a set exists within a collection of dealt cards is NP-complete.

== Reviews ==
Set appeared in the February 1992 issue of Games magazine, where Eric Berlin described it as an "addictive, highly original game of perception and logic" and a "fascinating challenge for either solitaire or competitive play." It also appeared in the 1992 Games 100 and in Family Games: The 100 Best.

== See also ==
- Projective Set
