= Loaded Questions (game) =

Board game

- Designers: Eric Poses
- Publishers: All Things Equal
- Players: 3-6

Loaded Questions is a question-based board game created by Eric Poses in 1996. The game emphasizes socializing.

== Gameplay ==
Recommend 4-6 players (but can be played with fewer or more players)

Poses said his game is "very simple" compared to strategy games, as in Loaded Questions "you get through the instructions in about three minutes." He said the game "tests players on how well they know each other."

Players try to be the first person to move from the "START" square to the "WIN!" square. Players traverse the board with dice rolls, and each turn, they have the opportunity to win bonus moves.

Once a player has moved the number of spaces indicated by the dice roll, the player draws a card and asks the question corresponding to the color that the player landed on. The board is made up of spaces of four colors: orange, purple, blue, and yellow, which correspond to questions of the categories "Hypotheticals," "Anything Goes," "No-Brainers," and "Personals," respectively.

Once the roller has read the appropriate question, all other players write their answers on a piece of paper, and one player reads the answers to the roller, who assigns answer writers for each response. For each correct assignment, the roller moves an additional space along the game board, and rolling commences in clockwise fashion.

The game board features "special spaces" in addition to regular, colored spaces. Multi-colored spaces indicate that the player can select any question, from the card drawn, "Happy Trails" spaces allow players to take the indicated shortcut, and "Reversals" call for special play procedures.

For a Reversal, the roller records an answer to the appropriate question, while all other players must anticipate the roller's response. Other players write what they expect the roller to write, and then all non-rolling players read their answers. Once all non-rollers have read, the roller's answer is shared. The roller moves an additional two spaces multiplied by the number of non-rollers who correctly anticipated the roller's response, and each correct non-roller moves two spaces.

Players win the game only after having landed on the "WIN!" space and playing one round where the roller correctly assigns each answer to the appropriate non-roller.

== Product development ==
Poses said he was inspired to create the game as a 23-year-old recent college graduate. After he developed the idea, he held a couple of Loaded Questions trial runs with friends before he quit his Miami job as an ad copywriter. He told his employer that he was leaving the job to invest in the board game, and Poses said the man asked to fund the game in return for "a large percentage of the success of the game." Poses declined the offer.

Poses said the game "worked well" in trial runs, and he decided to prepare 5,000 copies of Loaded Questions shortly after resigning.

Thirteen years later, in 2009, Poses is still writing new questions. The black edition of his game comes with more than 1300 questions, and Poses said he wrote 1200 of them. Some of his question writing happens in a conventional work environment, as he sits in his office with coffee and sometimes "Bailey's to keep me into it," but he said this isn't the only place where he finds himself inspired.

The questions also just happen, where if I'm in my car, you know, someone might cut me off, and I'll think, "What's the worst thing someone can do while you're driving?" and I'll write that down in my car. So the questions happen all the time.

He said he finds himself especially productive during pre-production time cramming, "just like I did in high school and just like I did in college."

== Manufacturing and early retail history ==
After investing $55,000 — one third of which was his parents' money — in the planning and manufacturing of the board game, Poses traveled and couchsurfed across America for 16 weeks to sell his new board game "out of (his car's) trunk" to toy store managers. The traveling board game salesman said he sold about 1,000 games throughout his 16-week trip, and one of his early buyers was Toys 'R Us. He reached a deal with some of the chain's Florida stores, ultimately resulting in the placement of 300 copies for the 1997 Christmas season. He said the board game "tested very well" for Toys 'R Us, so the chain decided to carry his game at all of its locations beginning in 1998.

In 2009, one million copies of the game had been sold, and it is carried by other retailers like Target and Barnes & Noble.

== Other game versions ==
- Adult Loaded Questions
- Loaded Questions on the Go
- Loaded Questions Junior
- Loaded Questions Parenting 101
- Loaded Questions Pop Culture
- Loaded Questions Political Party
