= Successors (board game) =

Board game published by Avalon Hill in 1997

Successors is a board game published by Avalon Hill in 1997.

== Gameplay ==
Successors is an ancient history wargame.

== Reception ==
- At the 1998 Origins Awards, Successors won the award for Best Historical Board Game of 1997.

== Reviews ==
- Backstab #8
