= Brawl (game) =

1999 card game

Brawl is a real-time card game designed by James Ernest and released in 1999 by Cheapass Games.

== Gameplay ==
Like Spit or Icehouse, players in Brawl do not take turns, instead either making a move or staying inactive as best suits their strategy at that moment. The game is fast-paced (games typically last a minute or two) but still has a fairly high level of strategy.

Each player has a different deck of cards. The object of the game is to win the most Base-cards by playing the most Hit-cards onto each Base before a Freeze-card is played on it. The game ends when a Freeze has been played on every Base in play. A player wins a Base-card if she has more Hits on her side of the Base than her opponent has on his side. If both players have the same number of Hits on the Base, the owner of the Base-card wins the Base.

== Reception ==
In 2001, Brawl: Club Foglio won the Origins Awards for Best Card Game Expansion or Supplement 2000 and Best Graphic Presentation of a Card Game 2000.

In 2005, the French company Eclipse Vis Comica published the six original decks in French (though the cards were in English), and added a new promotional deck, Natacha which was available only with the proof of purchase of all 6 standard decks. These decks were all 44 cards instead of the original 35 cards, and included new rules, including "customization" options. For this edition, the name of the game was changed to Fight, and the characters were all replaced with more flashy, anime-style characters.

In November 2011, the California company Brode Games released the original six decks on iPhone and iPad. BRAWL briefly made the top 25 free card games list on the App Store.

== Reviews ==
- Pyramid
