= Give Me the Brain =

Card game

- Special Edition (full color) version
- Designers: James Ernest
- Illustrators: Brian Snōddy
- Publishers: Cheapass Games
- Players: 3 to 8
- Setup time: 1 minute
- Playing time: 5-20 minutes
- Chance: Medium
- Age range: 8 and up
- Skills: Luck, Bidding

Give Me the Brain is a discard-style card game designed by James Ernest and released in 1996 by Cheapass Games. In the game, players assume the role of zombies attempting to complete their tasks for the day at Friedey's, "the fast food restaurant of the damned", yet they only have one brain to share between them. The game inspired several sequels, all set at Friedey's.

The original edition was the recipient of an Origins Award for Best Traditional Card Game of 1997. A Czech-language version of the original game was released in 1997 with the name Dej sem mozek. An expanded Special Edition was released in 2002, and was nominated in the same category for the 2003 Origins Awards.

Just as Steve Jackson Games re-released Lord of the Fries in 2008, it was revealed at PAX 2010 that a third edition of Give Me the Brain would be released in the same manner.

== Game play ==
Each player receives a hand of cards at the start of the game; the objective of Give Me the Brain is to play all cards in your hand, which corresponds to your zombie completing all the work assigned for the day. Each card is labeled with zero, one, or two hand icons; when it's your turn, you can play any number of cards, provided that together they show a total of no more than two hands.

Every card has some special effect on the game, and this must be dealt with whenever a card is played.

Some cards, indicated by a brain icon, require your zombie to have the brain in order to play. The brain is represented by a token that is held by one player at a time. The brain can be obtained by a number of methods: most commonly, many of the special effects written on cards will change which player has the brain. At the start of the game, a "Brain Auction" occurs to decide which player will have the brain to start with: in a Brain Auction, players must play Brain Bid cards from their hands to bid on the brain, and the highest bidder receives it. A player who holds no Brain Bid cards is not eligible to receive the brain, but holding Brain Bid cards can be a bad thing as well, as described below.

Every card which carries the brain icon also has a number printed just below it. After playing a card which features the brain, the player must roll a 6-sided die; if the result is less than the number shown on the card, the zombie has still completed the task but has managed to drop the brain in the process, triggering another Brain Auction. Since Brain Bid cards are cards in your hand, it is necessary to play all the ones you have in order to win: but since they can only be played during Brain Auctions, it may be necessary for a player to deliberately trigger Brain Auctions – or even to bid against themselves – in order to win.

== Reviews ==
- Siegel, Scott Jon (2007-06-01). "Off the Grid reviews Give me the Brain!". Joystiq. Archived from the original on 2008-05-11.
- Valentinelli, Monica (2004-10-23). "Give me the Brain! Review". FlamesRising.com.
