= Pig (card game) =

Card game

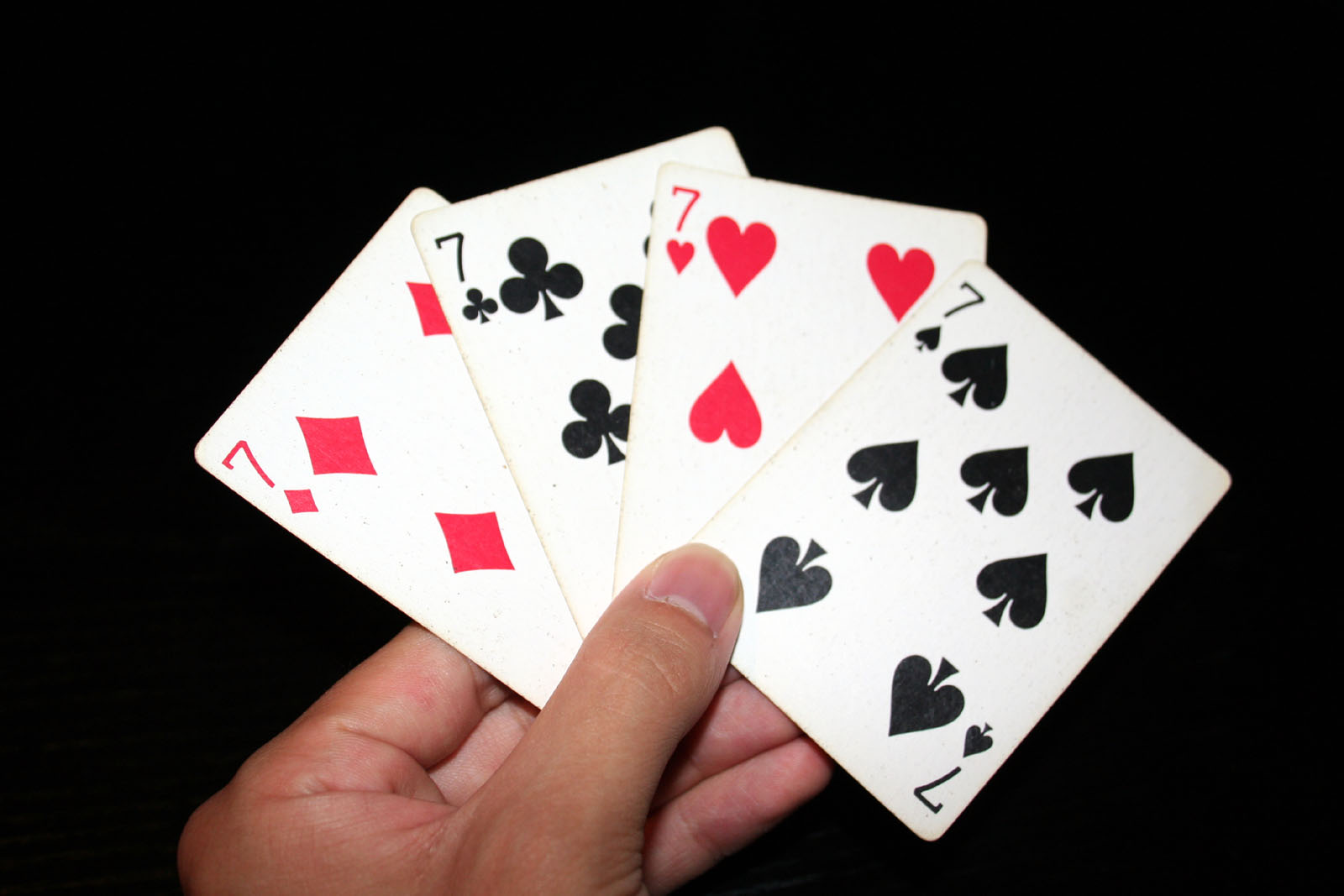
- Players aim to collect "four of a kind"
- Origin: US
- Type: Collecting
- Players: 3–13 (4–7 best)
- Skills: Stealth, memorising
- Age range: 7+
- Deck: French
- Play: Clockwise

Related games
- Happy families, my ship sails, vive l'amour

Pig is a simple, collecting card game of early 20th century American origin suitable for three to thirteen players that is played with a 52-card French-suited pack. It has two very similar and well known variants – donkey and spoons. It is often classed as a children's game. It may be descended from an old game called vive l'amour. In the Philippines, a similar game variant known as 1-2-3 Pass has developed where the players have to put their hand on the center of the table once someone got a four-of-a-kind.

== History ==
According to Richard L. Frey, the ancestor of pig was an old, four-player game called Vive l'Amour in which the aim was to be first to collect all 13 cards of one suit. The rules of vive l'amour first appear in 1821 and it continued to feature until the early 20th century. (Note: See e.g. Rulemann (1909).) Despite the name it only ever appears in German literature. Later sources say that, on going out, the winner shouts "Vive l'amour!" which explains the story that when the Patriarch of Venice, Jacques Monico was playing cards, he called "Vive Marie!" whenever the rules required him to shout "Vive l'amour!"

Frey thus sees pig as a "modern simplification" of vive l'amour, its name being simply a "bowdlerism" of the earlier game. Pig is first recorded in 1911 where it is called "a rather noisy game" in which the first player to collect a quartet (four of a kind) laid their cards down "either quietly or violently, as he may choose" and the last one to put cards down became "pig". The number of rounds was agreed in advance and the player who came last the fewest number of times was the winner or "big pig."

Although intended for children, the game was also apparently played by adults with special cards in those parts of the US where standard playing cards were taboo.

In 1957, a variant, donkey, is mentioned by Culbertson. The rules are identical; the main exception being that, whereas in pig players touch their noses when they acquire a quartet, in donkey, a number of objects – one fewer than the number of players – is placed in the middle and the first player with a quartet calls "Donkey!" and takes one. The subtle distinction between the two games is missed by some later authors. Gibson (1974) states that the games are "practically identical", while Maguire describes pig but calls it donkey. Maguire introduces the rule that 'donkeys' receive the letters of the word D-O-N-K-E-Y and the first to spell the whole word is the overall loser. He also records the game of Spoons for the first time, describing it as a variant in which, however, the player who stays to the end without spelling S-P-O-O-N-S is the overall winner. Arnold equates pig and donkey, while Spadaccini and Bicycle Cards faithfully describe the original pig.

== Rules ==
=== Vive l'amour ===
Vive l'amour is the earliest known game of this type. The following is a summary of its earliest rules (1821), which were reprinted until at least 1889.

The game is for four players and uses a full pack of 52 French-suited cards. After being well shuffled the cards are dealt around so that each player receives 13 cards. Forehand begins by exchanging a card, face down, with the player to his or her right. That player does the same and this continues around the circle. As soon as a player has 13 cards in the same suit, they show their hand and win the stake for that hand.

In the late 19th century, however, a modified version appeared in which cards were exchanged "to the left and right" and the winner shouted "Vive l'amour!" on going out. Ulmann adds that each player anted an agreed stake to a pot beforehand and that the dealer dealt the cards one by one.

=== Pig ===
The rules of pig have changed little over time. Frey's are as follows:

Pig is suitable for six to ten-year olds. Three to thirteen may play, but four to seven is best. The aim is to be first to collect a quartet, i.e. four cards of the same rank, known as a book. The game requires as many quartets as there are players e.g. if five play, five quartets are used from a 52-card pack and the rest laid aside. Players are dealt four cards each which they pick up and view. (Note: The cards must of course be shuffled although the rules are not explicit.) Then all the players simultaneously discard one card face down to their left and, after doing so, they all pick up the card from the player to their right. A player who collects a book immediately touches the nose with a finger. As soon as they spot this, the other players do likewise. The last player to touch the nose is the pig and loses the deal.

According to Culbertson, the game is best for more than three players – "the more the merrier" – and is often played by adults at parties as an ice-breaker.

Variations:

- Go! or Start!: The dealer calls "Go" or "Start" to initiate the passing each time. Once all players have passed their cards to the left, if no-one has a quartet, play continues until any player has a quartet.
- P-I-G: Each player has three lives scored as P-I-G. The first player to be assigned P-I-G is the overall loser and, optionally, has to oink like a pig. Alternatively, whoever is assigned P-I-G is eliminated from the game so that the last player standing is the overall winner.
- Pointing: Players point to their noses instead of touching them.
- Twin Pack: For more than 13 players, two packs may be used.
- Two Winners: The loser drops out after each deal, and the last two left in are joint winners.

=== Donkey ===
Having probably emerged by 1945, (Note: Ostrow (1949) contains rules for a game called donkey and they may have appeared in the 1945 edition of his book. It is certainly covered by Mulac in 1946.) the rules of a variant called donkey are described in the 1957 Culbertson's Hoyle. They are the same as in the early version of pig above, except that "a number of chips, matches, or other tokens" are used; always one fewer than the number of active players. These objects are placed in the middle. A player who collects four of a kind, calls "donkey" and takes a chip, etc. The others now also pick up a chip if they can and the player left without a chip is the donkey and loses the game.

In Mulac (1946), donkey only differs in that, instead of placing a finger on their noses, players put their hands either side of their head imitating donkey ears. She also gives a version using objects such as spoons or spools, which she calls spoof.

Maguire (1990) adds the requirement for a scorekeeper and introduces the rule that, each time a player becomes the donkey, that player is assigned a letter from that word. The first player to be assigned all the letters, i.e. D-O-N-K-E-Y, is the loser. (Note: Strictly speaking, Maguire is describing the rules for pig, because no objects are used in his description.)

Variations:

- Swap!: The dealer calls "Swap" each time to initiate the exchanging of cards.
- Prizes: For a party game, prizes are used as the objects.

=== Spoons ===
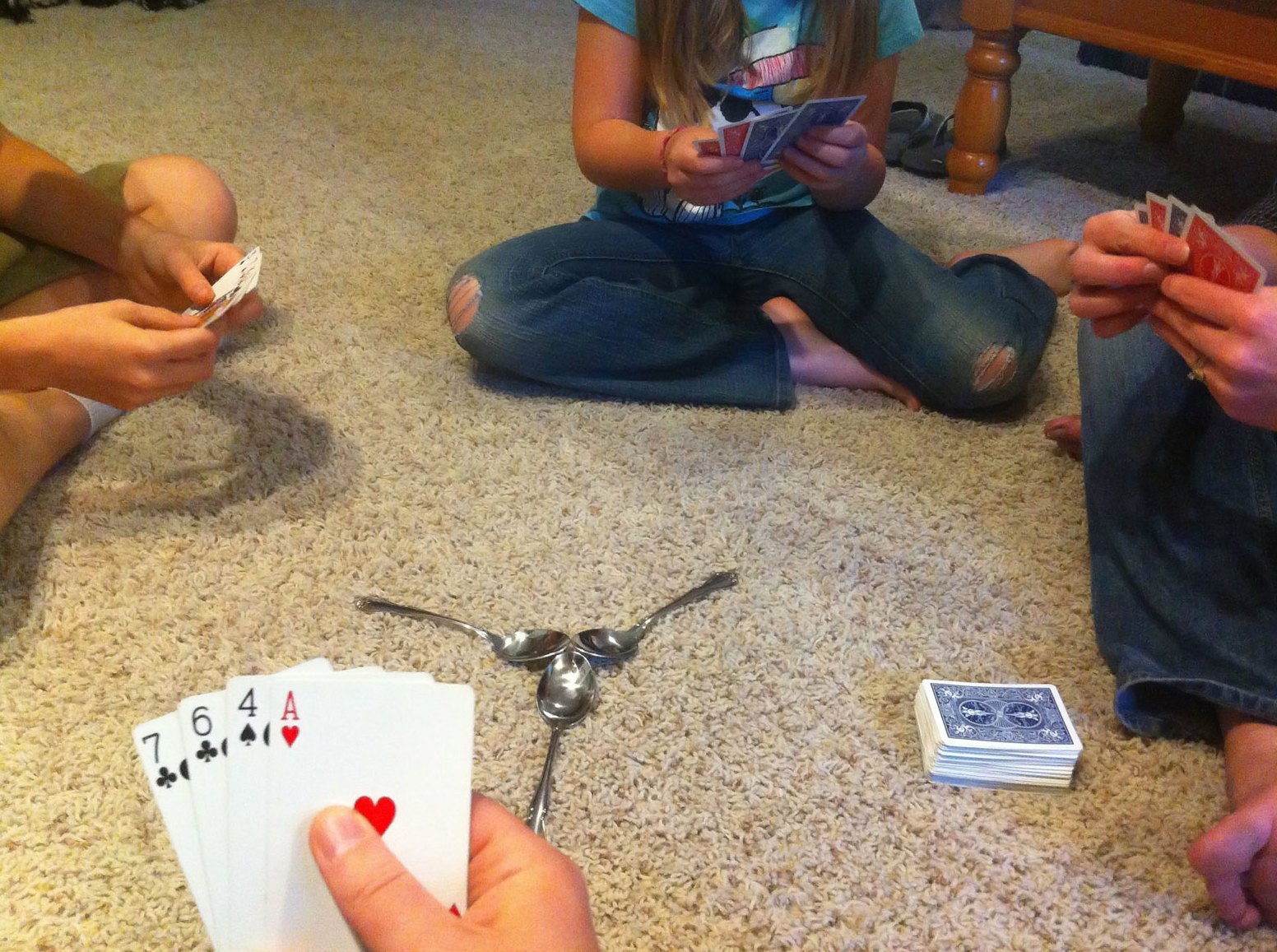
A game of spoons in progress

The name spoons first appears in 1990. It is essentially donkey using spoons as the objects to be picked up. (Note: Maguire adds "or any objects that are safe and easy to grasp," which is ordinary donkey, but he has confusingly already described pig as donkey.) However, a version of pig called spoof using "empty thread spools or spoons or some other small article..." is described by Mulac as early as 1946.

In spoons, the player left without a spoon in each deal is assigned a letter from the word 'spoons'. The player who gets S-P-O-O-N-S is eliminated from the game, and the game continues. The last player standing is the winner.

Variations:

- Stockpile: A whole 52-card pack is used, and so there is a stockpile from which the dealer draws each time and a discard pile to which the player on their right passes a card each time.
- Five Cards: Players are dealt five cards each, but still only need a four-of-a-kind to pick up a spoon.
- Extreme Spoons/Hidden Spoons: Instead of the middle of the play area as usual, the spoons are placed in some inconvenient location nearby.
- Series: As its name implies, it is a series of games with one player eliminated each time, and the last player standing is the overall winner.
- Two Winners: Similar to Series, but the last two players left in are joint winners.

=== Tongue ===
In the game of tongue, players quietly stick out their tongue when they have a quartet.

== Tactics ==
Tactics may include:

- Bluffing: Bluffing is allowed. Spoons may be reached at any time as long as they are not touched. This may distract the others or even cause players to grab a spoon prematurely which may result in their elimination.
- Eyes on the spoons: Players keep an eye on the number of spoons in case one has been taken without anyone noticing.
- Continuing to play. After sticking out a tongue or collecting a spoon, a player may continue to pass and pick up to confuse other players, but must keep the quartet intact. This is not possible with pig as one hand is needed to touch the nose.

== See also ==
- Happy families – quartet-collecting game
- My ship sails – collecting game in which several cards of one suit are needed to win
- Musical chairs – elimination game involving players, chairs and music

== Literature ==
- _ (1821). Das neue Königliche l'Hombre. Lüneburg: Herold & Wahlstab.
- _ (1854). The North British Review, Vol. XX. November 1853 – February 1854. Edinburgh: Kennedy.
- _ (2014), The Card Games Bible, Hamlyn, London: Octopus. ISBN 978-0-600-62994-8
- Anton, Friedrich (1889). Encyclopädie der Spiele, 5th edn. Leipzig: Otto Wigand.
- Bathroom Reader's Institute (BRI). 2012. Uncle John's Book of Fun. Portable Press. ISBN 978-1-60710-666-1
- Arnold, Peter (2009). Chambers card games for families. Chambers Harrap, Edinburgh. ISBN 978-0550-10470-0
- Culbertson, Ely (1957). Culbertson’s Card Games Complete. Arco.
- Foster Jnr., Walter (2018). 101 Games to Play Before You Grow Up. Lake Forest, CA: Quarto. ISBN 978-1-63322-337-0
- Frey, Richard L. (1947) [Also Albert Morehead and Geoffrey Mott-Smith, but they were not permitted by contract to allow their names to be used]. The New Complete Hoyle. David McKay.
- Frey, Richard L., Morehead, Albert H. and Geoffrey Mott-Smith (1956). The New Complete Hoyle. NY: Garden City Books.
- Georgens, Dr. Jan Daniel and Jeanne Marie Gayette-Georgens (1882). Spiel und Sport or Illustrirtes Allgemeines Familien-Spielbuch, Leipzig and Berlin: Otto Spamer.
- Gibson, Walter Brown (1974). Hoyle’s Modern Encyclopedia of Card Games. Dolphin.
- Hapgood, George (1911). Home Games. Philadelphia: Penn.
- Kansil Joli Quentin (2001). Bicycle Official Rules of Card Games, 90th edn. Cincinnati: USPC.
- Katz, Nikki (2012). The Book of Card Games. Simon & Schuster.
- Maguire, Jack (1990). Hopscotch, Hangman, Hot Potato & Ha Ha Ha. New York, London, Toronto, Sydney: Simon & Schuster. ISBN 0-671-76332-6.
- Ostrow, Albert A. (1949) [1945]. The Complete Card Player. 1st edn published in England. London: Bodley Head.
- Parlett, David (2008). The Penguin Book of Card Games, Penguin, London. ISBN 978-0-141-03787-5
- Spadaccini, Stephanie (2005). The Big Book of Rules. London, NY, etc: Penguin. ISBN 0452286441
