= Projective Set (game) =

Mathematical card game

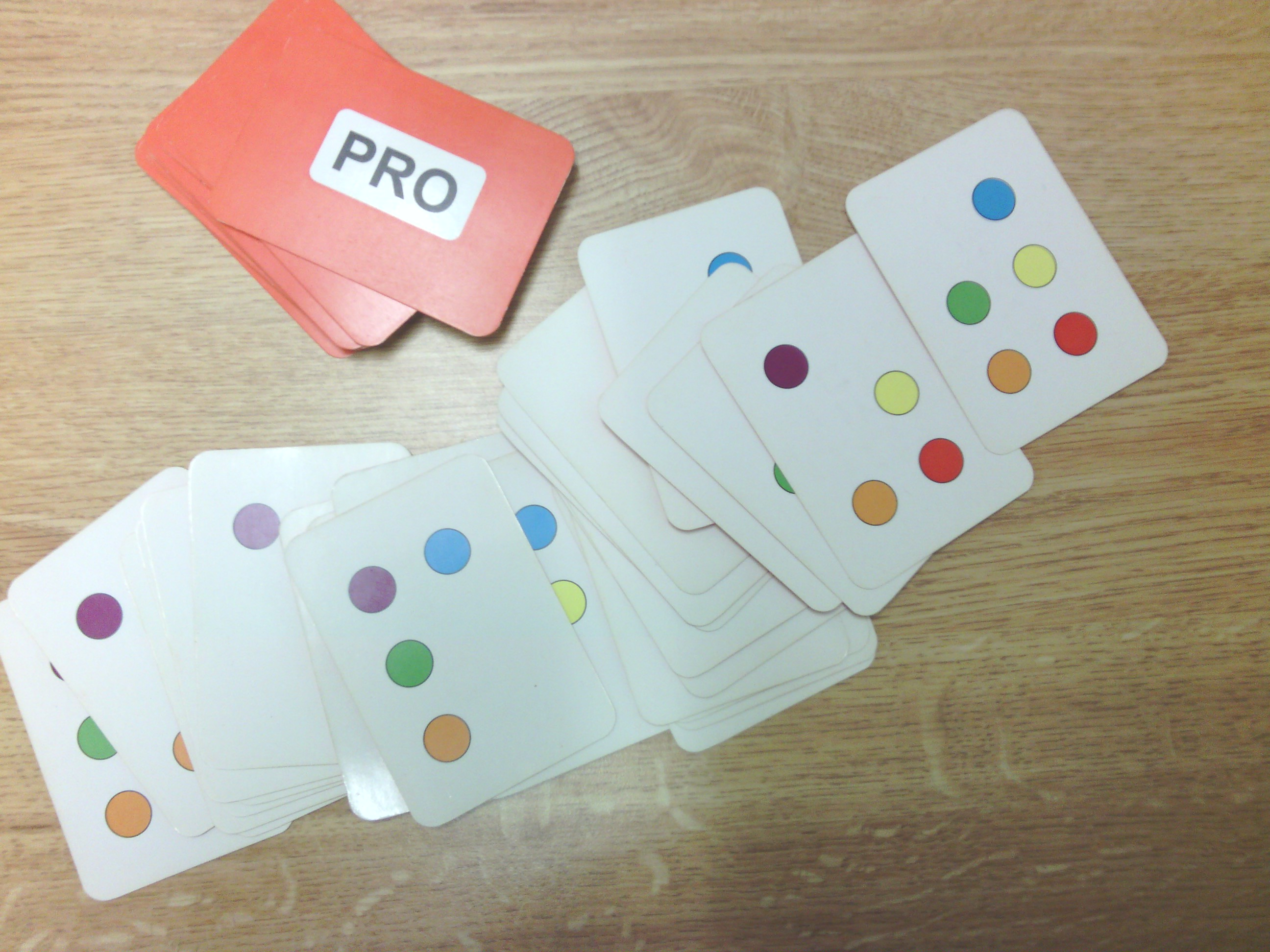
A Projective Set deck.

Projective Set (sometimes shortened to ProSet) is a real-time card game derived from the older game Set. The deck contains cards consisting of colored dots; some cards are laid out on the table and players attempt to find "Sets" among them. The word projective comes from the game's relation to projective spaces over the finite field with two elements.

Projective Set has been studied mathematically as well as played recreationally. It has been a popular game at Canada/USA Mathcamp.

== Rules ==
A Projective Set card has six binary attributes, or bits, generally represented by colored dots. For each color of dot, each card either has that dot or does not. There is one card for each possible combination of dots except the combination of no dots at all, making $2^6 - 1 = 63$ cards total.

Three cards are said to form a "set" if the total number of dots of each color is either 0 or 2. Similarly, four or more cards form a "set" if the number of dots of each color is an even number.

A card and itself could be said to form a two-card set, but as the cards in the deck are all distinct, this does not arise in actual gameplay.

=== Original Version ===
In the original version, as in Set, 12 cards are laid out on the table. The first player to find three cards which form a set and call out "set" takes the three cards. Three new cards are then dealt and the play continues until the deck is depleted.

If at any time the players agree there is no set among the cards, three new cards can be dealt, bringing the total number of cards on the table to 15. Other than this, new cards are not dealt out unless the number of cards on the table goes below 12.

The game ends when the deck is depleted and no more sets can be found among the cards on the table. The player who captured the most sets is the winner.

=== 7-card Version ===
A variation of the game, more popular than the original, allows sets of any size, rather than just sets of size three. 7 cards are put out on the table at a time, and when a set is found (with anywhere from 3-7 cards), all the cards from the set are taken and then replaced. Points are generally given at the end according to how many cards each player captured rather than how many sets.

It turns out that among any 7 cards there is a set, under these rules, so there is no extra rule necessary for the case that no set can be found.

== Mathematics ==
The cards of a Projective Set deck can be thought of as nonzero vectors in the finite vector space $\mathbb{F}_2^6$. The collection of all such vectors is the finite projective space with order 2 and dimension 5. Three cards form a set if and only if the corresponding points are collinear in that space. More generally, in the variant, $n$ cards form a set if and only if the corresponding vectors add to the zero vector.

In Set, there can exist 20 cards out of the 81 without a set, but no more. In Projective Set, there can exist up to 32 out of the 63 cards with no (3-card) set.
