= Witch Trial (game) =

Card game

- Art by Charles Dana Gibson
- Designers: James Ernest
- Illustrators: Charles Dana Gibson
- Publishers: Cheapass Games
- Publication: 2001

Witch Trial is a card game published by Cheapass Games in 2001 that is a light-hearted take on the Salem witch trials, although dressed in early 20th-century garb through the use of artwork by artist Charles Dana Gibson (creator of the Gibson Girl). The game garnered positive critical reception and was nominated for an Origins Award.

== Description ==
Witch Trial is a game for 3 to 7 players in which they either try to prove a woman is guilty of charges, or try to defend her.

=== Components ===
The game has sheet of rules, a deck of cards containing Suspects, Charges, Evidence, Motions, and Objections; and a board representing the courtroom.

Players must supply two six-sided dice and $3000 of play money.

=== Setup ===
Each player is given $50, and the balance of money is placed in the Bank. Each player is dealt six cards. An additional five cards are dealt in a line face up on the table leading away from the deck. This is called the "lineup".

=== Gameplay ===
At the start of a player's turn, the player can choose one activity:

- Buy a card from the lineup: The card in the lineup closest to the deck is free. The cost then increases by $5 for each card in the lineup; that is, the second card costs $5, the third card is $10, etc. Once a card has been purchased, a replacement card is added to the lineup in the place furthest from the deck; that is, in the $20 position. When a player buys a card, the player also gets to draw another card from the deck. Money paid for the card goes into Court Fees.
- Create a Case: The player must pair either one Suspect card from their hand to a Charge card in the lineup, or one Charge card from their hand to a Suspect in the lineup. Both cards are moved in front of the player as a pending case, and another card is drawn from the deck and is placed in the $20 position in the lineup. Each player is only allowed one pending case at a time.
- Defend a Pending Case: A player may force a pending case to go to trial immediately by offering to defend the Suspect.
- Prosecute your case: A player with a pending case in front of them may choose to immediately take the case to trial, and one of the other players is randomly chosen to be the a public defender.
- Pass: A player may choose to pass rather than taking one of the four actions.

==== Going to trial ====
The Suspect and Charge cards are moved to the courtroom. Only the player acting as a Prosecutor and the player acting as Defender (either voluntarily or as chosen randomly) are involved in the trial; the other players are spectators. There are seven steps in a Trial:

1. Pay the Defender: Each Suspect card has a "Defense" value. This is paid to the Defender from the bank.
2. Stock the Court: Move an amount of money from the Bank to Court Fees equal to the "Court" value on the Charge card.
3. Set the Jury Value: The Guilt of the Suspect number taken from the Suspect card is added to the Severity of the Charge number from the Charge card to create a Jury Value of between 2 and 12.
4. The Prosecutor makes a case: The Prosecutor plays any number of Evidence and Witness cards that numerically add to the apparent guilt of the Suspect, as well as Motions and Objections to Motions. The Prosecution can also play a new Charge card, which supersedes the previous Charge, and may increase the Jury Value. The prosecution then rests, and may offer a plea deal to the Defender, offering to divide the Court Fees money with the Defender. If the two players can come to an agreement about how to divide the money, then the trial is over.
5. The Defender makes a case: The Defender then has all the same opportunities to play cards, but this time to decrease the apparent guilt of the Suspect. Once the Defender rests their case, they can also offer a plea deal. If the players cannot agree on a deal, the trial continues.
6. The final argument: The Prosecutor plays a final card, which can be Evidence, a Witness, a new Charge, or a Motion.
7. Roll the Jury: The Prosecutor rolls two dice and adds them to the Jury Value. If the result is 13 or higher or if the prosecutor rolled an 11 or 12, the Prosecutor wins the case, and is awarded all of the Court Fees money. If the result is 12 or lower, the Defender wins, and takes the Court Fees money.

=== Victory conditions ===
The game ends when the deck is exhausted and there are no more cards in the lineup. The player with the most money wins the game.

=== Strategy ===
Critic Olivier Collin noted, "The game's strategy hinges on building cases that cannot be refuted by the opposing side as well as the ability to negotiate an amicable settlement to split the trial proceeds." Brad Weier added, "each player must perform a cost/benefit analysis before buying a card, [knowing] all of the other players can see which card the buyer is taking."

== Publication history ==
Cheapass Games was founded by James Ernest in 1995 when he had the revelation that most game owners have plenty of dice, counters, play money, and other common board game accessories, so there was no need to bundle all of these components with every game that requires them. The resultant games have only the bare necessities: rules, a board if needed, and proprietary cards or counters. One of these bare-bones games was Witch Trial, designed by Ernest, with reproductions of art by early 20th-century artist Charles Dana Gibson. It was published in 2001.

In 2015, New Games Order published a Japanese language edition, ウィッチトライアル 日本語版.

== Reception ==
In Pyramid, Brad Weier commented, "The game scales well from three to seven players, but with more players the time between turns can become a bit long." However, Weier also noted, "players with a penchant for drama will enjoy explaining exactly why the Widow Shelly is guilty of public lewdness and how her faithful pet helps prove her guilt." Weier concluded, "Witch Trial is the best of Cheapass Games' most recent offerings."

In Issue 33 of the French games magazine Backstab, Olivier Collin commented "Witch Trial is an interesting game that requires players who enjoy role-playing and are not overly concerned with the game's aesthetics (the board is simply cardboard, with no other components)." Collin concluded by giving the game a rating of 4 out of 5.

Games included Witch Hunt in their Top 100 Games of 2001.

== Awards ==
- At the 2001 Origins Awards, Witch Trial was a finalist in the category "Best Abstract Board Game."
