= Dragon Hordes =

1998 board game

Dragon Hordes is a 1998 board game published by Corsair Publishing.

== Gameplay ==
Dragon Hordes is a game in which a six‑faction fantasy wargame is set on Eorthe, where dwindling magical Eorthewells spark planet‑wide conflict among humans, elves, dwarves, dinosaur‑riders, sea‑folk, and undead, playable with counters or miniatures.

== Reviews ==
- Pyramid
- InQuest Gamer #40
