= Vegas Showdown =

Board game

- First edition, 2005
- Players: 3 to 5
- Setup time: < 5 minutes
- Playing time: 1 hour+
- Chance: Medium
- Age range: 12 and up

Vegas Showdown is a board game published by Avalon Hill in 2005 in which players compete to build the most impressive hotel and casino in Las Vegas. It was named "Game of the Year" by Games Magazine in 2007.

== Description ==
Vegas Showdown is a board game for 3–5 players, each of whom starts with a mat representing their hotel. Each turn various rooms or features become available, and players bid on them in order to add them to their hotel. These can include slot machines, lounge acts, and restaurants, and can increase the player's fame points and/or their income. Players can also spend money on publicity.

=== Strategy ===
Critic Wolfgang Sofic suggested, "Recognize the opportunities that present themselves to gain the victory points that are crucial for a victory. This cannot be achieved solely through the victory point cards to be auctioned off, and a good supply of money from the casino, restaurant and hotel operations is required. The balancing act of quickly making a lot of money in order to acquire the expensive cards early on, while using clever tactics to tempt others into making bad speculations, is a large part of the appeal of the game."

=== Victory conditions ===
The game ends immediately when one play fills their mat completely. The player with the most fame points wins the game. In the case of a tie, the player with the most fame and the most money wins.

== Publication history ==
Vegas Showdown was designed by Henry Stern and published by Avalon Hill in 2005 with artwork by David Hudnut, Scott Okumura, and Peter Whitley. In 2012, Avalon Hill, by then owned by Wizards of the Coast, published a second edition. In 2024, Renegade Studios announced they would be publishing a third edition.

== Reception ==
Writing for the German games website Westpark Gamers, Wolfgang Sofic didn't like the thin paper used for tokens and the casino mat, noting, "the playing figures are somewhat fiddly to handle. Instead of the somewhat thin-looking paper for the casino basic plan, a sturdier cardboard would be an advantage." Despite this, Sofic concluded, "The game is easy to learn, although in my opinion 12-year-olds will find it a bit overwhelming. The approximately 1½ hours of playing time are entertaining and the game doesn't get boring even after repeated use."

The French game review website Jedisjeux commented, "We had fun bidding on others, even if it meant ruining ourselves, as long as the opponents didn't have that gaming table or that luxury bar! It's not the game to be played every two days, but once in a while, a little auction game like this feels good." The conclusion was "Basically, it is a short game with real strategic choices that will require players to constantly adapt!"

Writing for the German review site H@ll 9000, Karen Nos noted, "Vegas Showdown draw its gaming appeal, which was perceived as high in all test rounds, from the diverse aspects of the strategy." Nos concluded, "All in all, Vegas Showdown is a thoroughly recommendable construction and auction game."

With all the variables counted for final victory, Frank Schulte-Kulkmann thought the final winner of the game was hard to foresee up until final point totals were counted, noting, "On the one hand, we have a playing mechanism which is relatively easy to learn and a scoring track on the main gameboard which allows the players to keep effectively track of the development during the game, but on the other hand we have a sophisticated final scoring which offers quite a few ways for scoring additional victory points and which may tip the game in favour of a player who did not really look like the winner if you have just kept watch of the main scoring track." Schulte-Kulkmann concluded, "Overall, the game offers some very fitting artwork which contributes greatly to the dense atmosphere of the game, and it is the combination of an entertaining playing mechanism with atmospheric artwork which makes the game really worthwhile to look at!"

== Awards ==
- At the 2006 Golden Geek Awards, Vegas Showdown was a finalist for "Best Family Board Game".
- Games Magazine named Vegas Showdown their "Game of the Year" in 2007.

== Other recognition ==
A copy of Vegas Showdown is held in the collection of the Strong National Museum of Play (object 112.676.20).
