= Stealth: The Game =

Stealth: The Game is a 1996 board game published by Talicor.

== Gameplay ==
Stealth: The Game is a game in which a science fiction game leans more toward abstract strategy, with minimal thematic elements or narrative background. The game features a mounted board and three-dimensional plastic components, including six "Stealth Attack Modules" per player—spaceship-like covers that conceal colored "Power Pieces." Each player has a fixed set of colored Power Pieces, with one red and two each of blue, green, yellow, and white. These are hidden within the modules and revealed during play. The game uses static-cling vinyl for "destroyed" markers.

== Publication history ==
Stealth, designed by Bruce Whitehill and published by Talicor in 1996, marks the company's first venture into two-player tactical wargaming after a history of educational titles.

== Reception ==
Pyramid magazine reviewed Stealth and stated that "Stealth is a new science fiction tactical game from a company that has previously only made educational games. It's an impressive first foray into the two-player wargaming field. To be honest, the science fiction flavor is very light - there is no background, and no real science, and it's only a step away from being simply an abstract game. Nonetheless, it's a very good game."

== Reviews ==
- Review by game designer Steffan O'Sullivan
