= Guillotine (1998 game) =

Card game

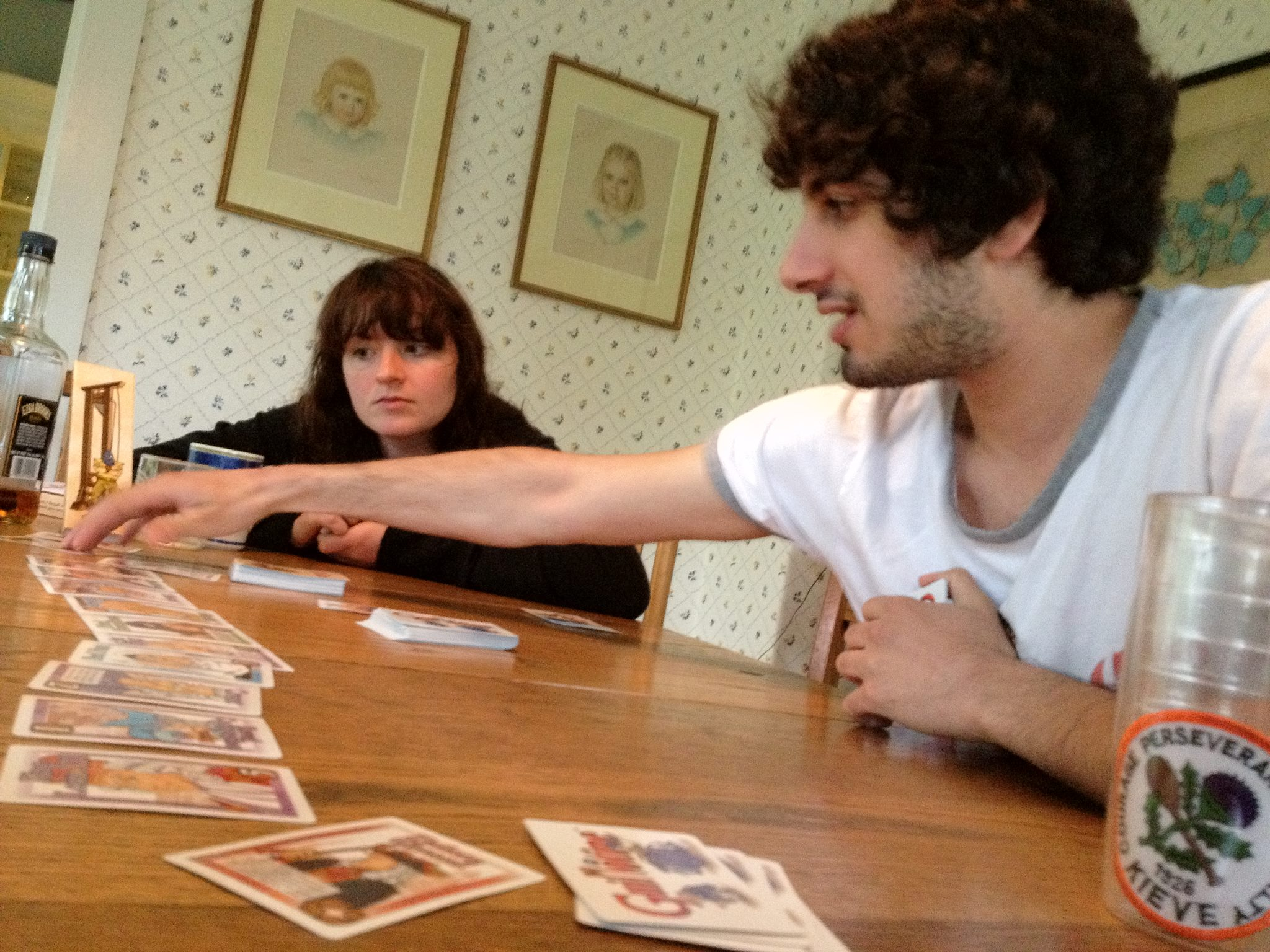
- A group of executioners playing Guillotine
- Designers: Paul Peterson
- Illustrators: Quinton Hoover; Mike Raabe
- Publishers: Amigo Spiele; Darwin Project; Hasbro; Play Factory; PS-Games; Wizards of the Coast
- Players: 2 to 5
- Playing time: 30 minutes
- Age range: 12 years and up

Guillotine is a card game created by Wizards of the Coast and designed by Paul Peterson. The game is set during the French Revolution, and was released on Bastille Day in 1998. The goal is to collect the heads of Nobles, accumulating points. Despite the grim topic of the game, the artwork is comical and the tone light.

== Overview ==
Game play, for two to five players, takes approximately 30 minutes. Game equipment consists of two decks of cards, "Nobles" and "Actions", and a small cardboard structure representing the guillotine itself. This is mostly symbolic, though it can serve as a convenient indicator of the direction of the "line" of face-up Noble cards played on the game table representing condemned persons waiting to be beheaded. The Nobles cards carry points values and are collected by players after execution, while Action cards allow the player to perform various acts including rearranging the order of Nobles approaching the guillotine, stealing Nobles or Action cards from other players, enhancing the point values of certain categories of Nobles (see "Noble Types" below) and so forth.

== Gameplay ==
The game is divided into three rounds or "days". Each day, twelve noble cards are dealt face-up in a row to be executed. A player's turn consists of:

1. Playing an Action card. This is optional.
2. Collecting the Noble card at the front of the line.
3. Drawing an Action card from the deck.

== Noble types ==
The Nobles come in five categories, each with its own color border:

- Church (blue)
- Military (red)
- Royal (purple)
- Negative (grey)
- Civic (green)

Grey nobles, typically martyrs that have public sympathy, are worth negative points so the player's goal is to avoid collecting them if possible. Palace guards, in the red category, have a special value in that each guard is worth the total number of guards collected. Thus one guard is worth one point, two guards are worth four points, three guards are worth nine points and so forth. The other Nobles have values ranging from 1 to 5 points.

A typical turn example is a player using an Action card to move a Noble two places forward in the line, i.e. advance a high-point Noble from third position to first, collecting that Noble, then drawing another Action card to end the turn. Other Action cards allow the player to move a Noble one or more places backward, useful for moving a low- or negative-value card off the front of the line to collect a higher-value second-position Noble.

Certain Noble cards affect the game, including a "Fast Noble" requiring the player who collects it to also take the next Noble in line. A card symbolizing Maximilien Robespierre (beheaded in 1794) causes the "day" to instantly end upon his decapitation. At the end of a "day" of gameplay (either by the collection of the Robespierre card or the exhaustion of the line), a new line of Nobles is dealt face-up and play resumes. After three "days", the player with the highest point total wins.

== Strategy ==
The key to winning the game is to manage which Nobles one collects through careful use of action cards while forcing other players to collect low- or negative-scoring Nobles. Some Action cards allow a player to prolong the "day" (by adding new Nobles to the line), shorten it by allowing Nobles to "escape," or end it, by playing the "Scarlet Pimpernel" action card.

== Availability ==
After several years of Guillotine being out of print, Wizards re-released the game in 2005 alongside The Great Dalmuti, another Wizards card game.

In addition to being reprinted, Guillotine was featured as one of the playable games in Gleemax Games Alpha on the Gleemax website.

== Reception ==
The reviewer from the online second volume of Pyramid stated that "Take France in the late 1700s. Add a large helping of various and sundry mostly useless nobility. Stir in a group of disaffected common citizens with no real political power. Then toss in a pinch of Professor Guillotine and agitate vigorously. Garnish with extremely amusing art and you have Guillotine, the hilarious new card game from Wizards of the Coast about trying to get a head." A review from Lautapeliopas praised the entertainment value, ease of play, and theme while criticising the components and omissions in the game's rules.

Guillotine won the 1998 Origins Award for Best Traditional Card Game.

== Reviews ==
- Family Games: The 100 Best
- Backstab #11
- Backstab #51
