= Button Men =

Dice game

- Designers: James Ernest
- Publishers: Cheapass Games
- Players: 2
- Setup time: 2 minutes
- Playing time: 10–180 minutes
- Chance: Medium
- Age range: 8 and up
- Skills: Probabilistic analysis

Button Men is a two-player dice game invented by James Ernest of Cheapass Games, first released in 1999.

A game of Button Men typically takes less than ten minutes to play. Each player is represented by a pin-back button or playing card of their choice. The buttons are usually metal or plastic discs, about 2–2.5 inches (5.1–6.4 cm) in diameter, with a pin on the back that can be used to fasten them to clothing. A button bears the name and illustration of the combatant ("Button Man" or "fighter") assumed by the player. Each button indicates the quantity, maximum value, and abilities (if any) of the player's dice.

== Background and history ==
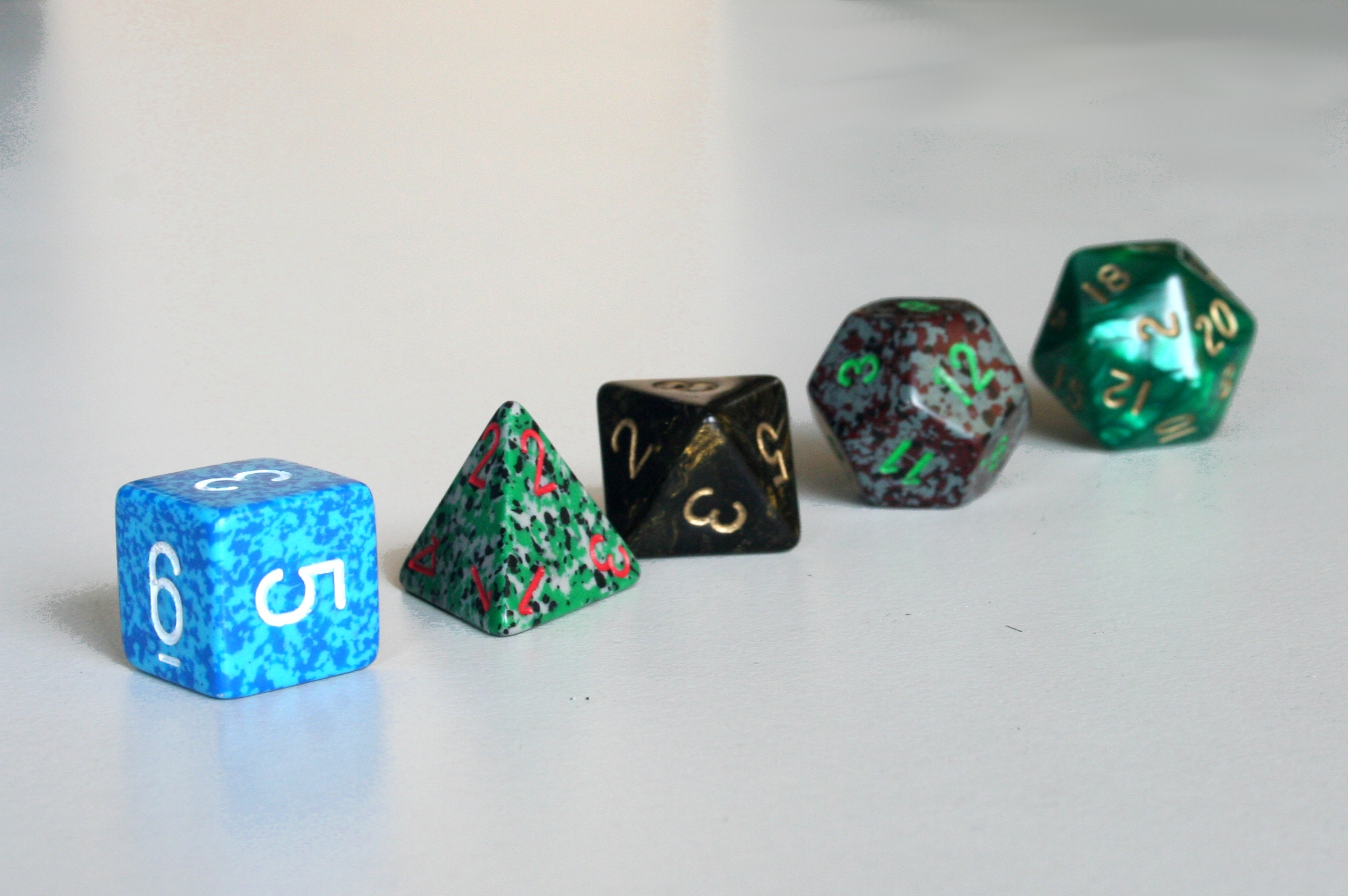
Button Men is played with polyhedral dice

Button Men is a game designed for fan conventions and other public venues. It can be played on short notice and games are quick to complete. Buttons are meant to be worn on clothing, bags, or other accessories, advertising that the wearer has a button to play with and is open to challenges. Buttons may also advertise something else, such as a company, a webcomic, or another game.

In 2000, Button Men won the Origins Awards for Best Abstract Board Game of 1999 and Best Graphic Presentation of a Board Game of 1999.

Button Men can be extended by creating more buttons. It has continued to be extended since its inception; as of 2004, over 200 buttons have been printed. Many are now out of print.

In 2009, Thrust Interactive released an iPhone version of the game in collaboration with Cheapass Games.

In 2011, Cheapass Games began reclaiming their older and out-of-print games in an experiment to apply the "freemium" business model to board games. Button Men was revamped into a trading-card format that can be printed and cut apart for gameplay. Two sets, "Soldiers" and "Vampires," have been released in this format.

In 2016, a Kickstarter was launched for a boxed version of the game that included up to 61 characters (in the Kickstarter exclusive version) and the dice needed to play any two characters against one another. This self-contained set included the old skills Shadow and Poison, but added a variation on Speed Dice called Rush Dice. In addition to this base set, a reissue of some of the original sets on cards and two Sailor Moon Crystal-based sets were released.

== Online game ==
Button Men Online was a service that allowed users to play games over the internet via a web-based interface. In 2003, Button Men Online won the Origins Award for Best Play-by-mail Game of 2002. In February 2012, Button Men Online went offline due to server problems. After nine months of downtime, a group of players from Button Men Online recreated an open-source version of the site. The new version of Button Men Online went online in March 2014.

== Gameplay ==
A game of Button Men spans multiple rounds. Players begin by rolling a set of polyhedral dice then proceed through several turns. During each turn, their goal is to manipulate their opponent's dice by using their own dice; either capturing, taking control of, or neutralizing them based on their current values. The first player who wins three rounds emerges as the winner.

== Reception ==
Scott D. Haring reviewed Button Men for the online second volume of Pyramid and stated that "This would be a great convention game, or a one-day game store event, or . . . just about anything. It's quick and fun, but requires some thinking. And some luck. A great game."

Pyramid's 1999 magazine named Button Men as one of the Millennium's Best Games. Editor Scott Haring said, "This game just gets more and more impressive every time I look at it. . . . the idea is so simple, and the strategy so subtle . . . I've never figured out exactly how to master this game, and I suspect that's because there is no good way to do so."

== Reviews ==
- Backstab #15
