= Before I Kill You, Mr. Bond =

Card game

- Designers: James Ernest
- Publishers: Cheapass Games
- Players: 3-6
- Setup time: 5 minutes
- Playing time: Varies with number of players
- Chance: Moderate
- Age range: 8 and up
- Skills: Strategy

Before I Kill You, Mr. Bond is a card game designed by James Ernest and published by Cheapass Games in 1996. Players take the roles of supervillains in a spy movie, capturing superspies (originally including one named "Bond") and taunting them. Other players can foil the taunts by playing another taunt with a letter that corresponds to the first taunt. If this happens, the superspy escapes and destroys the fortress of the player attempting to kill him.

In 2001, following a cease and desist order from Metro-Goldwyn-Mayer, the game was taken off the market. The winning entry of a contest to rename the game was What Part of ‘Doctor No’ Don’t You Understand?, but for legal reasons this could also not be used as the game's title. Instead the game was reissued in 2004 as James Ernest's Totally Renamed Spy Game with a 110-card deck, double the size of the deck in the original game.

In 2016 a new version of the game was released under the title Before I Kill You, Mister Spy, which returned to the 55-card deck size of the original game.

== Reviews ==
- Pyramid
