= Cheapass Games =

American game company

- Industry: Games
- Founded: 1995; 31 years ago
- Founder: James Ernest
- Headquarters: Seattle, Washington, United States
- Website: Cheapass Games Double Secret Website

Cheapass Games is a game company founded and run by game designer James Ernest, based in Seattle, Washington.

Cheapass Games was originally founded on the philosophy that most game owners have plenty of dice, counters, play money, and other common board game accessories, so there was no need to bundle all of these components with every game that requires them. Cheapass games thus came packaged in white envelopes, small boxes, or plastic resealable bags containing only those components unique to the game - typically a rules sheet, a playing board printed on card stock, and game cards banded by magazine-cutout "sleeves". This allowed the company to produce games for prices well below the market average. Cheapass later offered some higher-quality, full color games under the "James Ernest Games" brand, but their minimalist black-and-white components offered for print-and-play have remained their signature style.

From 2019 to 2025 the Cheapass Games catalogue of games was licensed to Greater Than Games, but in 2025 reverted to James Ernest's company Crab Fragment Labs.

== History ==
Ernest originally developed the idea for selling basic games without all the common components while freelancing at Wizards of the Coast during the 1990s. However, Wizards rejected the idea, and in 1995, Ernest quit and started up the company. Creating the games by hand, he initially showed the games at tradeshows and conventions, resulting in sales demand from game stores. The company created and assembled each game pack by hand, with most games only being made in runs of up to 5,000 copies.

Cheapass Games and James Ernest have won several awards for game design including the 2002 Origins Award for best play-by-mail game (Button Men Web Game), the 2002 Origins Vanguard Award (Diceland), the 1997 Origins Award for best abstract board game (Kill Doctor Lucky), and the 1997 Origins Award for best traditional card game (Give Me the Brain).

Cheapass' game Pennywise was awarded the parodic 2003 "Spud des Jahres" award for most overpriced game by the website Spielboy (see Spiel des Jahres).

In 2004, the indie band Beatnik Turtle released The Cheapass Album, an album inspired by games from Cheapass Games.

In October 2007, Cheapass Games stopped updating their web site; a message on the homepage explained: "Cheapass Games is in the process of hibernating, which means we can be a bit sluggish and hard to reach. Most of us have moved on to better careers, and James Ernest is slumbering peacefully in a warm hole in the ground."

In 2009, Cheapass created a Button Men app for the iPhone. Paizo Publishing is selling some Cheapass games on its website.

In 2011, Cheapass Games resumed updating their website with a new business model: Games were released for free in PDF format for gamers to print and play, and customers were asked to donate a dollar or two if they like the game. James Ernest says, in the game rules, "I've decided to try a different gamble. I'm giving my games away for free. This way, you can read the rules, make a copy, and even play the thing, before you decide what it's worth. If you do like my games, I hope you will send me some money. But I'm also hoping you will share this experiment with your friends. You are my sales force, my marketing department, my demo team." New games were usually accompanied by the Ransomometer, where potential customers are encouraged to donate a certain dollar amount before a game is released to the public.

In 2012, Cheapass Games offered their first Kickstarter project, a deluxe reprint of their previous game Unexploded Cow. This was followed in 2013 by another Kickstarter project for a deluxe version of their earlier Deadwood game, called Deadwood Studios USA. Nine more Cheapass games were produced with the help of Kickstarter in the period 2013 to 2018, including the abstract strategy game Tak, which was a collaboration between James Ernest and Patrick Rothfuss, and was based on a game in Rothfuss' book The Wise Man's Fear.

In 2019, it was announced that Greater Than Games had acquired the license to publish Cheapass Games, and taken over sales of Cheapass Games inventory.

With the help of 1,867 backers on Kickstarter, at the end of 2019 a 628 page hardcover book Cheapass Games in Black and White was published, which was a retrospective of the 22 years of Cheapass Games up to that point, and included coverage of more than 100 of their games.

In 2021, Greater Than Games was acquired by Flat River Group, and was subsequently shuttered in 2025 due to tariffs. As a result, all rights to Cheapass Games reverted to James Ernest's company Crab Fragment LLC, which made many of the games from the Cheapass Games catalogue freely available in print-and-play PDF format from their website.

== List of Cheapass Games ==
Many of their out-of-print games were offered for free by Cheapass via their website. The cards, rules, or other game materials could be downloaded for free, with Cheapass requesting a voluntary payment if the recipient liked the game.

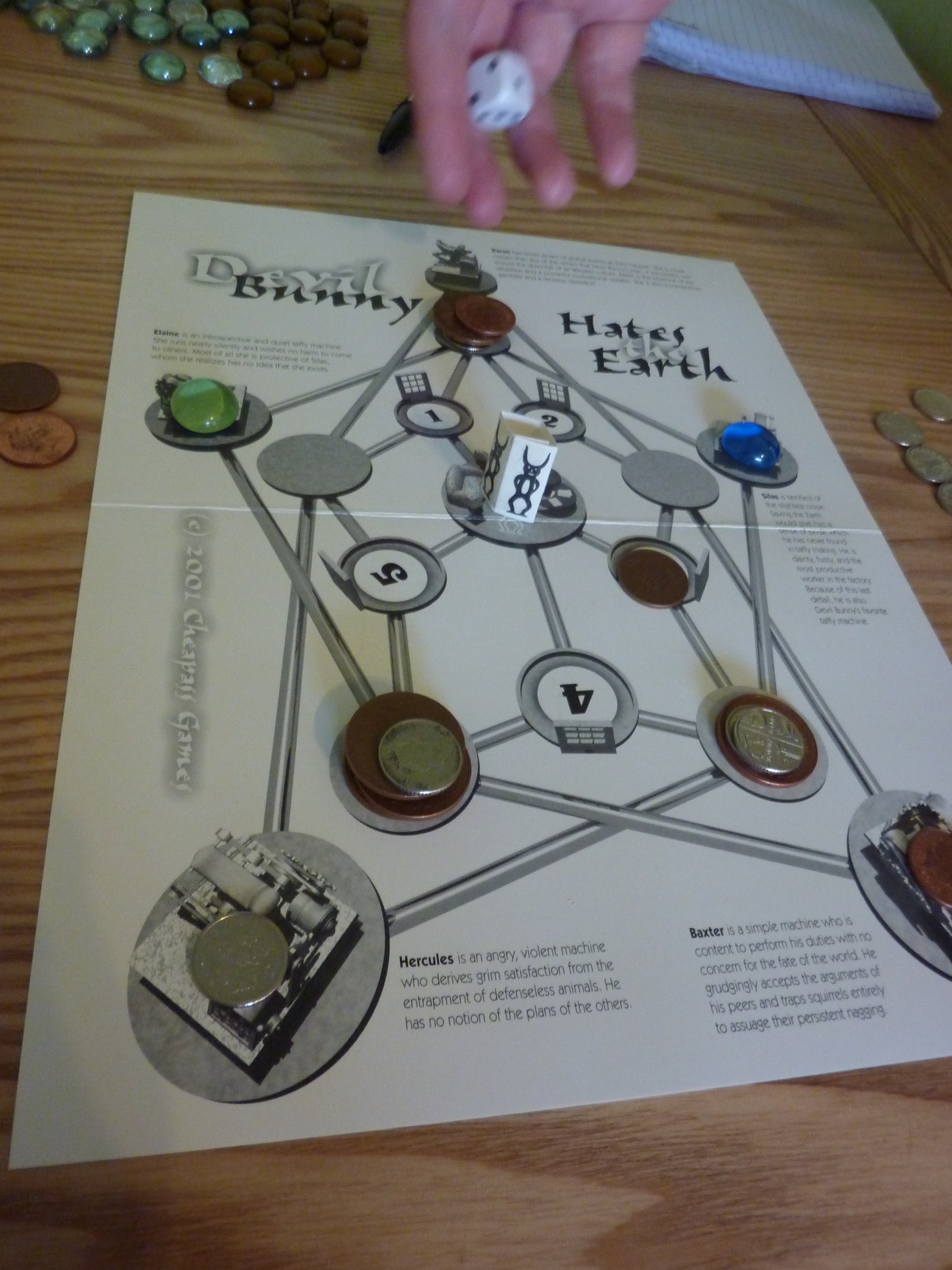
The board and pieces for Devil Bunny Hates the Earth, a popular Cheapass games title.

- Before I Kill You, Mr. Bond - a game of attracting interesting people to your lair, then killing them. Reissued in 2004 as James Ernest's Totally Renamed Spy Game
- Ben Hurt - a game involving betting and chariot races
- The Big Idea - a game involving venture capitalism and marketing
- Bitin' Off Hedz - a simple game of dinosaurs and rocks
- Bleeding Sherwood - a game with a Robin Hood theme
- Brawl - a real-time card game
- Button Men - a collectible button-and-dice game, sold in sets of two to six buttons
- Captain Park's Imaginary Polar Expedition - a game of faking travels
- Captain Treasure Boots
- The Chief Herman games:
  - Chief Herman's Holiday Fun Pack
  - Chief Herman's Next Big Thing
- Deadwood - a game of bad actors
- The Devil Bunny games:
  - Devil Bunny Needs a Ham - a game of buildings and Devil Bunny
  - Devil Bunny Hates the Earth - a game of squirrels, taffy machines, and Devil Bunny
- Diceland - a collectible cardboard dice game
- The Digital Eel computer games:
  - Plasmaworm - based on the classic Snake game
  - Strange Adventures in Infinite Space - the first space roguelite
  - Dr. Blob's Organism - a shoot em up based on John Conway's cellular automaton, Life
  - Big Box of Blox - a rule-breaking match three type game
  - Boiler Plate Special (Mac compilation)
- The Doctor Lucky games:
  - Kill Doctor Lucky - a game of killing and not being seen
  - Kill Doctor Lucky—Craigdarroch - another place to kill
  - Save Doctor Lucky - a game of saving and being seen
  - Save Doctor Lucky on Moon Base Copernicus - another place to save
- Enemy Chocolatier
- Escape from Elba - a game of many d6 and spelling weapons
- Falling - a real-time game about falling to your death
- Fightball - a real-time card game about a futuristic sport, designed with Mike Selinker
- Fight City - a trading card game of gangs and cards
- Fish Cook
- Freeloader - a game about borrowing all that you can
- The Friedey's games:
  - Give Me the Brain - a game of zombies and their jobs. Origins Award winner for Best Traditional Card Game of 1997
  - Lord of the Fries - a game of zombies and fast food orders
  - Change! - a game of zombies and money
  - The Great Brain Robbery - a game of zombies and train robbery. Origins Award winner for Best Science Fiction or Fantasy Board Game 2000
  - Dead Money - a game of zombies, the wild west and losing at poker
- Get Out - a game of finding work
- Girl Genius: The Works - a game of Phil Foglio's Girl Genius comic
- The Grave Robber games:
  - Parts Unknown - a game of mad scientists and economics
  - Renfield - a game that plays like a combination of Poker and Hearts.
- The Hip Pocket games:
  - Agora - a game of market stalls
  - The Big Cheese - a small bidding game featuring mice and dice
  - Cube Farm - a game of cubicle layout
  - Light Speed - a real-time card game about mining spaceships
  - Nexus - a game of nodes
  - Safari Jack Remix - a game of tracking animals
  - Steam Tunnel - a game of tunnel control
  - TimeLine - a game of time travel
  - The Very Clever Pipe Game - a game of connecting pipes
- Huzzah! - a game of Renaissance Faires.
- Jacob Marley, Esq. - a game of loans
- James Ernest Writes Off Another Trip to VEGAS - a game of casinos and cheating
- Landyland - a promotional game using Magic: The Gathering's basic lands
- Mana Burn - a promotional game using Magic: The Gathering cards
- The One False Step games:
  - One False Step for Mankind - a game of getting to the Moon
  - One False Step Home - a game of getting back from the Moon
- Pairs (card game) - a game with a nontraditional triangular deck
- Punch Cards - a game for conventions
- Safari Jack
- Secret Tijuana Deathmatch - a game of buying the contracts of illegitimate wrestlers and pitting them against each other
- Spree! - a game of firearms and larceny
- Starbase Jeff - a game of gambling in space
- Tak - an abstract strategy game based on a game introduced in Patrick Rothfuss's book, The Wise Man's Fear
- U.S. Patent No. 1 - a game of racing through time to get the first patent issued
- Unexploded Cow - a game of marching mad cows through bomb fields
- Veritas
- Witch Trial - Prosecuting and defending women on trial

== Reviews ==
- Backstab #12
