= James Ernest =

American game designer (born 1968)

James Ernest (born October, 1968) is an American game designer and juggler, best known as the owner and lead designer of Cheapass Games.

== Career ==
Prior to founding Cheapass Games, Ernest worked as a juggler at various venues, including Camlann Medieval Village, and as a freelancer with Wizards of the Coast. He also worked for Carbonated Games. He has also created games for other publishers including Rio Grande Games and WizKids. In 2005, Paizo Publishing created Titanic Games with Ernest and Mike Selinker.

Ernest's games include Unexploded Cow, Kill Doctor Lucky, The Big Idea and the game originally known as Before I Kill You, Mr. Bond (that game was eventually renamed after complaints from the owners of the Bond franchise). He has had success with Kickstarter, successfully crowdfunding games like a new version of Unexploded Cow and Get Lucky (which takes the concept and core mechanics of Kill Doctor Lucky and adapts it as a card game), among others.

Ernest wrote, produced, directed, edited, and created music for the short film The Man Between (2003) and wrote the book Dealer's Choice: The Complete Handbook of Saturday Night Poker. His first publication was the book Contact Juggling in 1990.

In 2014 James began collaborating with Patrick Rothfuss to create an abstract strategy game called Tak, based on a game described in Rothfuss's 2011 book The Wise Man's Fear. In April 2016 they launched a Kickstarter campaign to bring the game to actual publication. The campaign ended on May 20 to great success, with 12,187 backers pledging $1,351,142.

In 2018 The Brothers Chaps, creators of Homestar Runner, collaborated with James to create the cooperative game Trogdor!! The Board Game. The successful Kickstarter campaign brought in 23,338 backers pledging $1,421,903 upon its completion.
