= 2002 Origins Award winners =

The following are the winners of the 29th annual (2002) Origins Award, presented at Origins 2003:

Category	Winner	Company	Designer(s)
Best Game-Related Periodical	Dork Tower	Dork Storm Press	Author: John Kovalic
Best Abstract Board Game	Kingdoms	Fantasy Flight Games	Designer: Reiner Knizia
Best Historical Board Game	Sid Meier's Civilization: The Board Game	Eagle Games	Designer: Glenn Drover
Best Science Fiction Or Fantasy Board Game	Marvel HeroClix: Infinity Challenge	WizKids	Designers: Mike Mulvihil & Jeff Quick
Best Board Game Expansion Or Supplement	Marvel HeroClix: Clobberin' Time	WizKids	Designer: Jon Leitheusser
Best Card Game Expansion Or Supplement	Munchkin 2: Unnatural Axe	Steve Jackson Games	Designer: Steve Jackson
Best Trading Card Game	A Game of Thrones: Westros Edition	Fantasy Flight Games	Designers: Eric Lang & Christian Petersen
Best Traditional Card Game	Star Munchkin	Steve Jackson Games	Designer: Steve Jackson
Best Game Aid Or Accessory	Gamemastering Secrets	Grey Ghost Press	Designers: Aaron Rosenberg, Matt Forbeck, Sam Chupp, Hilary Doda, Ann Dupuis, Lee Gold, Kenneth Hite, Larry D. Hols, Steven S. Long, Steven Marsh, Frank Mentzer, John Nephew, John R. Phythyon, Jr., Jean Rabe, Mark Simmons, Lester Smith, James M. Ward, Ross Winn, John Kovalic, & Janice Sellers
Best Game-Related Fiction, Graphic Form	Understanding Gamers (from Dork Tower #18)	Dork Storm Press	Author: John Kovalic
Best Game-Related Fiction, Long Form	Ghost War	ROC	Author: Michael Stackpole
Best Game-Related Fiction, Short Form	Enemy Healer (from The Official Mage Knight Collectors' Guide 1& 2)	WizKids	Author: Terri Hamilton
Best Graphic Presentation Of A Board Game Product	Mage Knight Dungeons	WizKids	Graphic Designers: Dawne Weisman, Sandra Garavito, Kevin Perrine, Chris Steely, Darren Elosh, Tina Wewegner, & Idea & Design Works
Best Graphic Presentation Of A Book Format Product	Nobilis, 2nd Edition	Hogshead Publishing	Graphic Designers: Carol Johnson, James Wallis, & Peter Gifford
Best Graphic Presentation Of A Card Game Product	Chez Greek	Steve Jackson Games	Graphic Designer: John Kovalic
Best Illustration	Mechwarrior: Dark Age Starter Boxes (Cover)	Wizkids	Artists: Matt Mcdonald, Sharon Turner Mulchill, & Vision scape
Best Historical Miniature	Boeing B-52 Stratofortress 1:1250 Scale	Noble Miniatures	Sculptors: Stephen Royen & Andy Rawling
Best Historical Miniature Series	Crusader Range	Griffin Miniatures	Designer: Dave Hughes
Best Historical Miniatures Rules	Kampfgruppe Commander	Sovereign Press	Designer: David Reynolds
Best Science Fiction Or Fantasy Miniature	Marvel HeroClix Sentinel	WizKids	Sculptors: Derek Miller & John Matthews
Best Science Fiction Or Fantasy Miniature Series	Mechwarrior: Dark Age	WizKids	Designers: Jeff Grace & Steve Saunders
Best Science Fiction Or Fantasy Miniature Rules	The Lord of the Rings: The Two Towers	Games Workshop	Designer: Alessio Cavatore
Best Play-By-Mail Game	Button Men Web Game	Cheapass Games	Designers: Dana Huyler, Loren Pierce, & James Ernest
Best Role-Playing Adventure	City of the Spider Queen	Wizards of the Coast	Designer: James Wyatt
Best Role-Playing Supplement	Celtic Age	Avalanche Press	Designers: Dr. Mike Bennighof, Ph.D., John R. Phythyon, Jr., & Ree Soesbee
Best Role-Playing Game	The Lord of the Rings Role-Playing Game	Decipher	Designers: Steven S. Long, John Rateliffe, Christian Moore, & Matt Forbeck
Game Of The Year	Mechwarrior: Dark Age	WizKids	Designers: Matt Robinson & Paul Nobles
Vanguard Award	Warchon	Z-Man Games	Tony Lee
Vanguard Award	Diceland	Cheapass Games	James Ernest
