= CONvergence =

Fan convention in Minnesota, United States

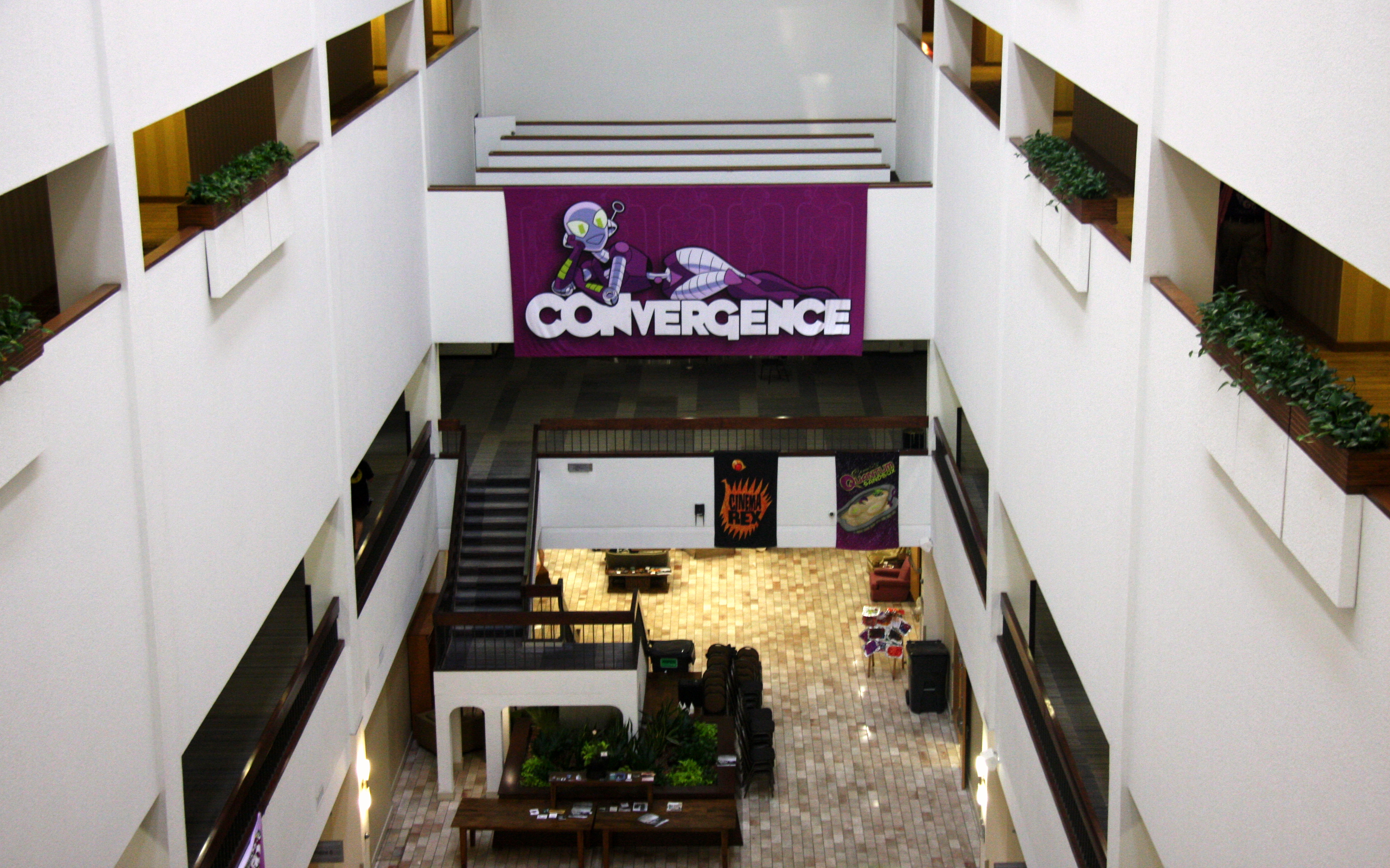
- Status: Active
- Genre: Multi-genre convention Science fiction convention Fantasy convention Speculative fiction Fan convention
- Frequency: Yearly
- Venue: Hyatt Regency Minneapolis in Minneapolis, Minnesota
- Locations: Minneapolis, Minnesota
- Coordinates: 44.9712981°N 93.2773887°W
- Country: United States
- Years active: 28
- Inaugurated: July 2, 1999
- Most recent: July 3, 2025
- Next event: July 2, 2026
- Participants: 3,437 (2022)
- Budget: approx. $400,000
- Organizer: Convergence Events, Inc.
- Filing status: Non-profit
- Website: convergence-con.org

Convergence (stylized "CONvergence") is an annual multi-genre fan convention. This all-volunteer, fan-run convention is primarily for enthusiasts of science fiction and fantasy in all media. The motto is "where science fiction and reality meet". It is one of the most-attended conventions of its kind in North America, with approximately 6,000 paid members in some years. The 2023 convention was held across four days at the Hyatt Regency Minneapolis in Minneapolis, Minnesota.

== Attractions ==
The convention is known for several attractions, which are available to members throughout the event.

=== Art and merchandise ===
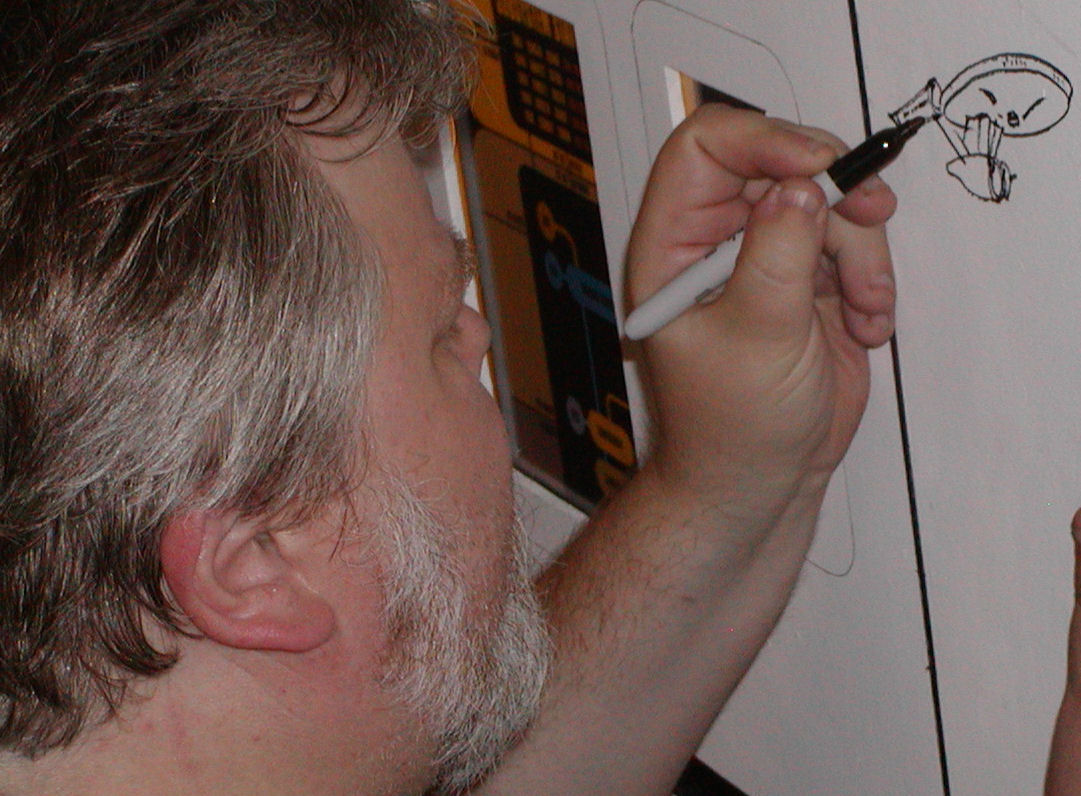
Daren Dochterman drawing Enterprise

- The Convergence art show offers items created by artists around the country. Some are available for a live auction or silent auction.
- The artists alley provides space for artists to offer commissioned art.
- The dealers room features a larger number of vendors selling crafts, apparel, or collectibles.
- The charity auction funds community activities provided by the Geek Partnership Society.
- Official CONvergence merchandise is available with branded goods and commemorative event apparel.

=== Social attractions ===
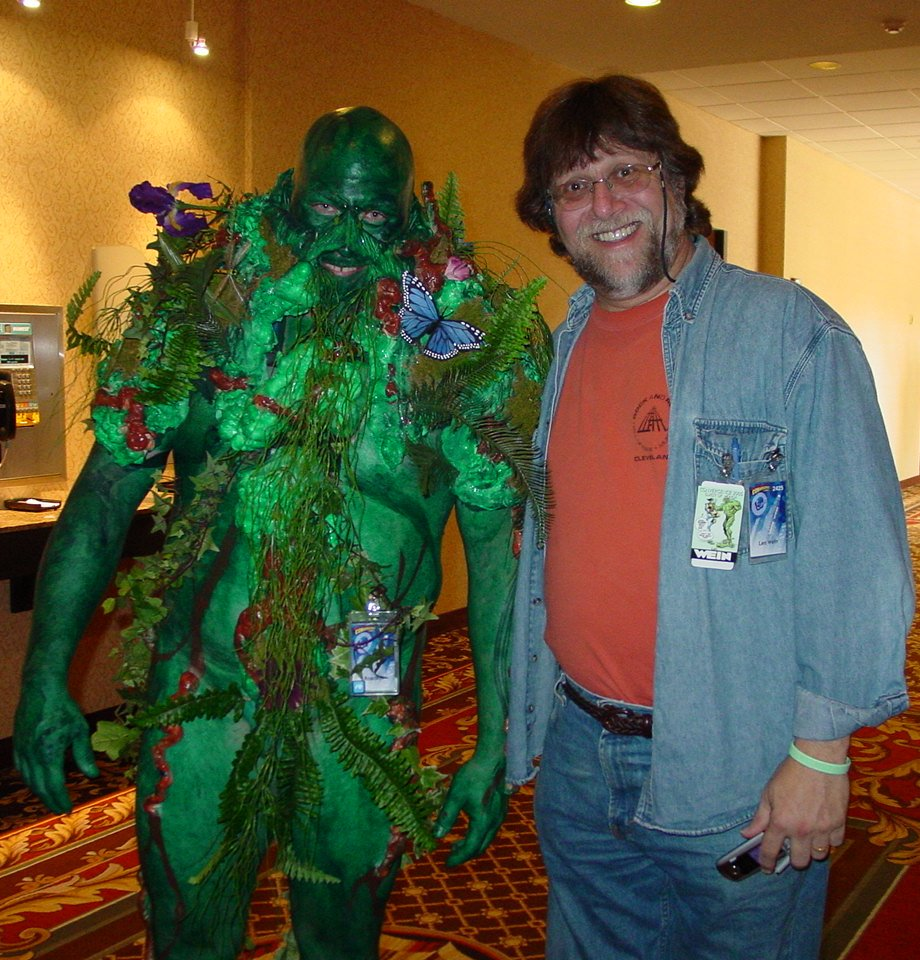
The late Bob "Roadkill" Aiken dressed as Swamp Thing, with creator Len Wein, at Convergence 2005

- The convention is known for its themed room parties hosted by community and fan groups. Each party room is unique from one another, each with varied themes. The walls of the convention are usually plastered with advertisements for different parties.
- Space lounge presents a futuristic space-themed entertainment venue with music, entertainment, and sensory refreshments.
- Several spaces for gaming are available at Convergence, with options for board games, card games, and roleplaying games. The gaming area offers LAN-based gaming, tabletop gaming, and Artemis: Spaceship Bridge Simulator, among other things.
- The Convergence teen room is available for members between 13 and 20 years old.

=== Programming areas ===
- Harmonic Convergence features live music, spoken word, burlesque, and comedy.
- Cinema Rex is a couch- and sofa-filled movie room. Running popular movies, short films, and film festivals, Cinema Rex provides drinks, popcorn, candy, and other refreshments.
- Theater Nippon presents a series of classic and modern anime with free drinks and candy.

=== Hospitality ===
Members of Convergence have access to a con suite, with complimentary rice and soups throughout most of the day, and around-the-clock access to candies, veggies, fruits, and chips.

== Events ==
many parallel programming tracks are run at Convergence, filling several convention rooms simultaneously with panels, speeches, demonstrations, recognitions, and screenings.

=== Panels ===
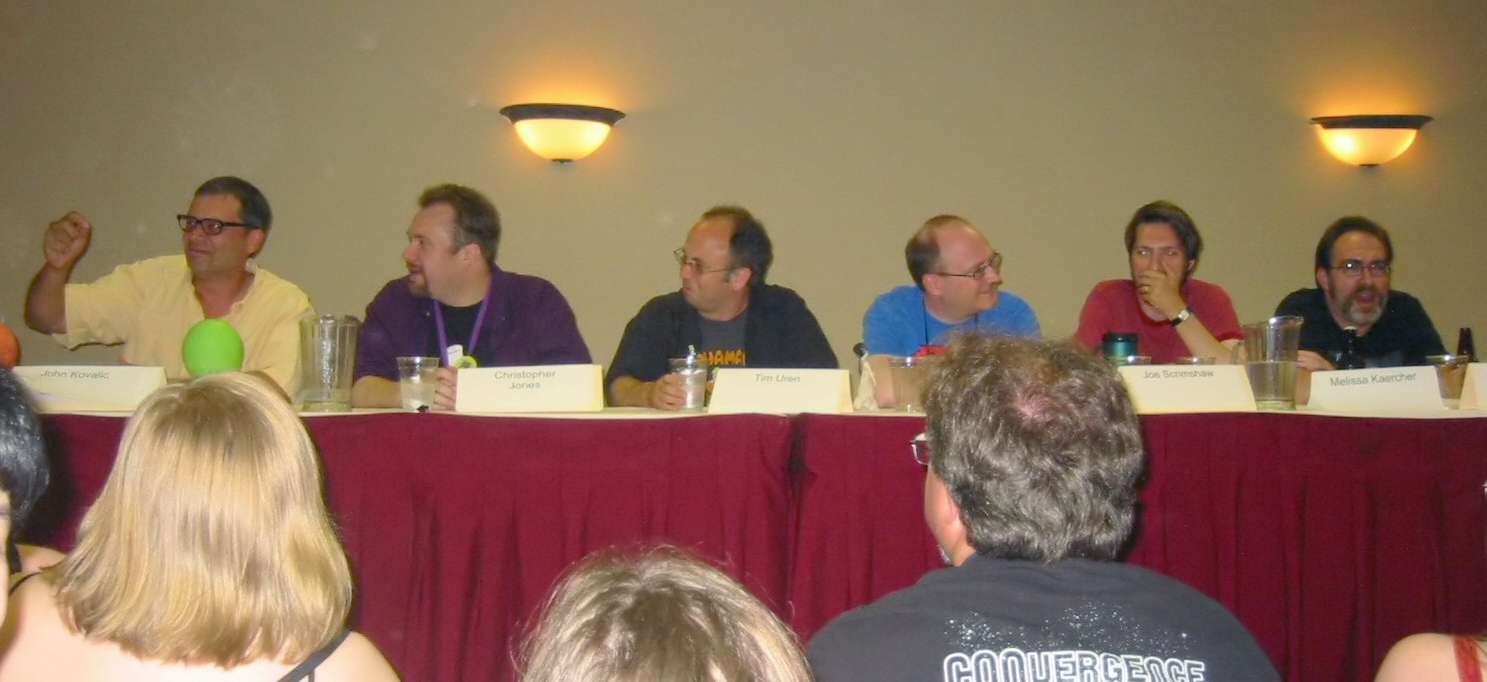
A panel of experts (including cartoonist John Kovalic, far left, and author Brian Keene, far right), debate who would win in a fight: Frankenstein's Monster or Cookie Monster.

Convergence panels are scheduled for each day, across a wide range of topics. Most panels are group discussions in front of an audience, while others are more interactive or performance-based.

=== Main stage events ===
The opening and closing ceremonies are held on a main stage, as well as live performances and other events that require a lot of space.

==== Masquerade ====
The masquerade event is held Saturday night, displaying the best in costuming and cosplay creations, usually with short skits.

==== Music events ====
Live music sometimes occurs at the main stage. Dances and raves are often scheduled for the late hours in the main stage area.

== Mascots ==

The primary mascot of Convergence is the gynoid "Connie", who is occasionally opposed by Connie's scheming younger sister, "Connie Mk. II".

== Guests of honor ==
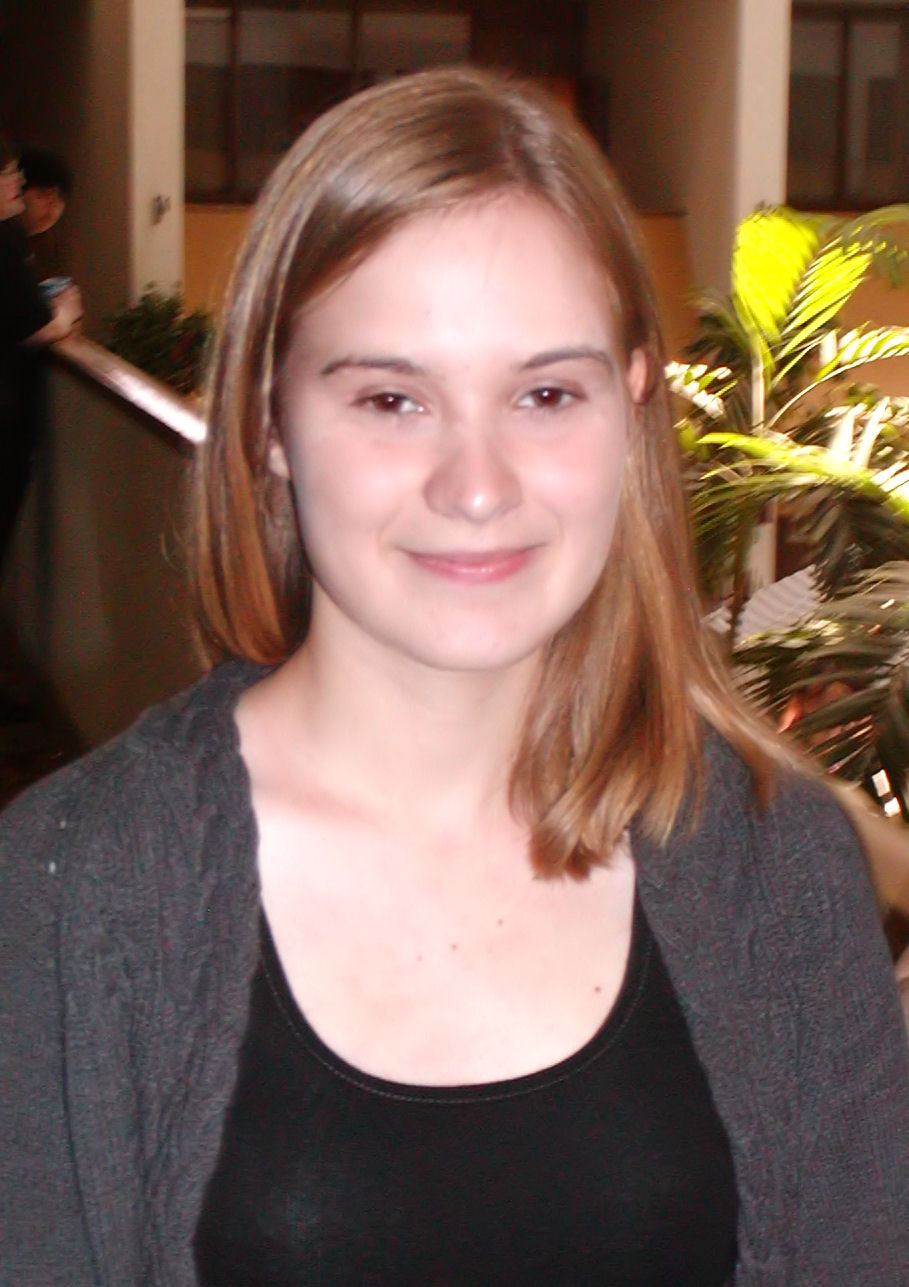
Emily Hagins

Like most science fiction conventions, CONvergence selects a few special guests every year.

Convergence guests of honor
Guest of honor	Known for	Years attended
Forrest J. Ackerman	SF historian and collector	1999
Pam Keesey	Author of Vamps! and other fiction	1999
Harry Knowles	Movie critic and web entrepreneur, Ain't It Cool News	1999, 2001, 2005, 2008
Jay Knowles	Web entrepreneur, Ain't It Cool News	1999, 2001, 2005, 2008
Gordon Purcell	Comic book artist	1999, 2018
Gary Russell	Producer of the Doctor Who audio series	1999
Neil Gaiman	Author of books, comics and film	2000
Peg Kerr	Award-winning author	2000
Regina Pancake	Hollywood prop creator	2000
Ruth Thompson	Fantasy artist	2000, 2012
Keith Topping	Author of Doctor Who novels and more	2000
Go To Hell! (cast and crew)	Adventure, comedy, horror film	2000
Peter Mayhew	Chewbacca in Star Wars	2001, 2008
Michael Sheard	British SF movie and television actor in Star Wars, Last Crusade, and many other projects	2001, 2003
Eleanor Arnason	Award-winning science fiction novelist	2001, 2018
Crist Ballas	Movie makeup and physical effects artist	2001, 2004, 2008
C.H. Morgan	Sci-fi and fantasy artist	2001
Diane Duane	Popular author of books and television	2002
Peter Morwood	Sci-fi and fantasy author	2002
Mark Altman	"Trekspert" and co-creator of Free Enterprise	2002
Robert Meyer Burnett	Co-creator and director of Free Enterprise	2002, 2008
Nene Thomas	Popular award-winning fantasy artist	2002
Daren Dochterman	Designer and illustrator for over 35 feature films	2002, 2008, 2016
Adam 'Mojo' Lebowitz	Author and former lead animation supervisor for Foundation Imaging	2002
Andrew Probert	Production designer for Star Trek	2003, 2008
Eric Flint	Author and editor of many books	2003, 2006, 2008
John Kovalic	Dork Tower and Dork Storm Press, Out of the Box Games	2003, 2007, 2008
Katherine Kurtz	Author of the Deryni trilogies and stories	2003
Denise Garner	Romantic fantasy artist	2004
David Gerrold	Science fiction/fantasy author of many books	2004
Larry Niven	Author of many science fiction books, including the Ringworld series	2004
Vincent Truitner	Animator and CGI artist	2004, 2008, 2018
Christian Colquhoun	Physical effects artist	2004, 2008
Len Wein	Writer for comics and animation, creator of Swamp Thing, Nightcrawler, and Wolverine	2005, 2008
Dr. Jim Kakalios	University of Minnesota physics professor, author of The Physics of Superheroes	2005, 2008, 2018
Mercedes Lackey	Author of many popular novels, including the Valdemar and Bardic Voices series and folk music lyricist	2005, 2008
Larry Dixon	Co-author of Mage Wars and Dariens Tale series, author of many short stories and game material and fantasy artist	2005, 2008
Marv Wolfman	Writer for comics and animation, creator of Blade, Bullseye, and The New Teen Titans	2005, 2008
J. G. Hertzler	Actor on Star Trek as General Martok	2006
Ken Hite	Role-playing game author and designer	2006, 2008
Bridget Landry	Astronomer, Jet Propulsion Laboratory Engineer (Hubble, Mars Pathfinder, and Cassini missions) and Master-level costumer	2006, 2008, 2010, 2019
Robert O'Reilly	Actor in many well-known science fiction TV series including Star Trek as Chancellor Gowron	2006
Miles Teves	Set designer	2006
David Weber	Author of military sci-fi	2006, 2008
Greg Weisman	TV and comic book writer, animation producer, Gargoyles	2006, 2008, 2011, 2014, 2016, 2018
Emily Hagins	Writer and director of the zombie movie Pathogen	2007
Brian Keene	Author of The Rising, Grave Conditions, The Last Zombie	2007, 2009, 2011
Bernie Wrightson	Comic book artist, co-creator of Swamp Thing	2007
Lois McMaster Bujold	Sci-fi and fantasy author	2007, 2017
Wally Wingert	Voice actor with credits including Invader Zim (Almighty Tallest Red), Bleach (Renji Abarai), and The Garfield Show (Jon)	2007, 2008, 2010
Trace Beaulieu	Mystery Science Theater 3000 (Doctor Clayton Forrester and Crow T. Robot) and Cinematic Titanic	2008, 2009
Mark Evanier	Writer of comics and television shows	2008
Joel Hodgson	Mystery Science Theater 3000 (Creator and on-air host Joel Robinson, seasons 1–5) and Cinematic Titanic	2009
Frank Conniff	Mystery Science Theater 3000 (TV's Frank) and Cinematic Titanic	2009
Mary Jo Pehl	Mystery Science Theater 3000 (Pearl Forrester) and Cinematic Titanic	2009, 2018
Kelly McCullough	Author of WebMage	2009, 2018
Dwayne McDuffie	Creator of Static Shock	2009
Patrick Rothfuss	Author of The Name of the Wind	2009
L.A. Banks	Author of the Vampire Huntress Legend series of novels as well as the Crimson Moon, Dark Avengers and Soul Food series	2010
Jeremy Bulloch	Actor with credits including The Empire Strikes Back/Return of the Jedi (Boba Fett)	2010
Paul Cornell	Writer for Doctor Who (television, novels, audio), novelist and writer for Marvel Comics (Captain Britain and MI-13)	2010, 2013, 2018
Chuck McCann	Veteran comedian, actor, and cartoon voiceover artist, voice of Sonny the Cuckoo Bird	2010
Jason Carter	Actor, Dead Matter, Babylon 5	2011
Edward Douglas	Gothic horror Fantasy musician, Midnight Syndicate	2011
Seanan McGuire	Urban fantasist, October Daye, InCryptid, Newsflesh	2011, 2017
Paul and Storm	Special musical performers	2011
Lynne M. Thomas	Librarian, author, editor of Chicks Dig Time Lords	2011
Anthony Tollin	Historian, publisher, comics colorist, The Shadow and Doc Savage reprints	2011
Catherynne Valente	Novelist, poet	2011
Brian Van Camp	Actor, Dead Matter	2011
Bonnie Burton	Writer	2012
Jenifer Clarke Wilkes	Game publications editor, Wizards of the Coast	2012
Judith Walcutt	Poet	2012
Lyda Morehouse	Writer	2012
Sophie Aldred	Actress	2012
Sharyn November	Editor	2012
Tamora Pierce	Writer	2012, 2018
Charlie Jane Anders	Writer and Blogger	2013
Lou Anders	Editor	2013
Caitlin Blackwood	Actress	2013
Bill Corbett	Mystery Science Theater 3000 and RiffTrax	2013
Kevin Murphy	Mystery Science Theater 3000 and RiffTrax	2013
John Picacio	Artist	2013
James Moran	Screenwriter Severance (film), Cockneys vs. Zombies, and Tower Block (film)	2013
Melinda Snodgrass	Author and Scriptwriter	2013, 2018
Greg Guler	Gargoyles character designer	2014
Marina Sirtis	Demona from Gargoyles, and Deanna Troi from Star Trek: The Next Generation	2014, 2018
Matthew Ebel	Musician	2014
C. Robert Cargill	Internet film critic, author	2014
Scott Lynch	Writer	2014
Amy Berg	TV producer, writer	2014
Emma Bull	Writer	2014
Sarah Clemens		2014
Wesley Chu		2015, 2018
Nicole Dubuc	Actress, writer	2015
Chad Frey		2015
Charlotte Fullerton	Writer	2015
Lee Harris	Hugo-nominated editor	2015, 2018
Jennifer Ouellette		2015
Gordon Smuder		2015
Toni Weisskopf		2015
Bryan Thao Worra		2015, 2019
Amal El-Mohtar	Poet, writer	2016, 2018
Amy Shira Teitel		2016
Cam Banks		2016
Christopher Jones	Professional comic book artist, attendee, and co-founder; designer of Connie and the other mascots	2016
Joseph Scrimshaw	Comedian, actor, and playwright	2016
Khary Payton	Actor	2016
Mark Oshiro		2016
Ytasha Womack		2016, 2018
Kristopher Carter	Composer	2017
Norman Cates		2017
Eric Chu		2017
Tracee Lee Cocco		2017
Naomi Kritzer	Speculative fiction writer	2017
Jai Nitz		2017
Ian Truitner		2017
Saymoukda Vongsay	Poet	2017
Elizabeth Bear	Novelist	2018
Lindsay Ellis		2018
Victor Raymond		2018
Lisa Snellings		2018
Michael "Knightmage" Wilson	Sheriff deputy, stunt performer	2018
Information Society	Band	2018
Guy Consolmagno		2019
Peter David	Writer	2019
Chuck Tingle	Writer	2019
Allen Turner	Game designer, writer	2019
The Doubleclicks	Band	2019
Elsa Sjunneson	Writer	2021
Laura Anne Gilman	Author	2021
T. Aaron Cisco	Writer	2021
Evva Karr	Designer, Activision Blizzard Media, Riot Games	2022
Matthew Kessen	Writer, performer, director	2022
Briana Lawrence	Writer	2022
Charles Urbach	Illustrator	2022
Jessica Walsh	Author, Seamstress	2022
Jack Zipes	Professor, Storyteller	2022

== Timeline ==
The idea for Convergence began at a room party held 28 years ago at the Minicon 33 event, where 500 pre-registrations to Convergence 1999 were collected. The planning team celebrated the one-year-to-go mark with a picnic on the weekend of July 4, 1998.

Convergence timeline
Date	Event	Theme	Location	Member attendance
July 2 – July 4, 1999	After All, It's Just a Party	Inaugural convention	Bloomington Radisson South Hotel	1,398
July 7 – July 9, 2000	No one can tell you what CONvergence is ... you have to experience it for yourself	The Matrix and similar fiction	Radisson, Downtown Saint Paul, Minnesota	1,533
July 6 – July 8, 2001	Curioser and Curioser	Alice in Wonderland and similar fiction	Bloomington Radisson South Hotel	1,615
July 5 – July 7, 2002	If Adventure Has A Name...	Indiana Jones and classic adventure themes in speculative fiction	Bloomington Radisson South Hotel	1,679
July 4 – July 6, 2003	Time Flies	Time travel	Bloomington Radisson South Hotel	1,709
July 2 – July 4, 2004	Out of the Shadows	Mystery and Noir, the dark side of speculative fiction	Sheraton Minneapolis South	2,014
July 1 – July 3, 2005	Snikt! Bamf! Thwip!	Super-heroes and comic books	Sheraton Minneapolis South	2,283
July 7 – July 9, 2006	Boldly Go.	Space exploration, such as Star Trek	Sheraton Minneapolis South	2,434
July 6 – July 8, 2007	Creature Feature	Monsters, Aliens and inhuman characters	Sheraton Minneapolis South	2,549
July 3 – July 6, 2008	Ten Years 1999–2008	Anniversary of Tenth CONvergence	Sheraton Minneapolis South	3,102
July 2 – July 5, 2009	This Con Goes to 11	Humor in Science Fiction and Fantasy, also the 11th CONvergence	Sheraton Minneapolis South	3,894
July 1 – July 4, 2010	Bring on the Bad Guys	Villains	Sheraton Minneapolis South	4,737
June 30 – July 3, 2011	Tomorrow through the Past	Steam punk & retro Science Fiction	Sheraton Minneapolis South	5,031
July 5 – July 8, 2012	Wonder Women	Female creators and characters of Speculative Fiction	DoubleTree by Hilton Bloomington	5,864
July 4 – July 7, 2013	British Invasion	British creators and characters of Speculative Fiction	DoubleTree by Hilton Bloomington	6,291
July 3 – July 6, 2014	A Midsummer Night's Dream	Urban Fantasy, such as the Gargoyles TV series	DoubleTree by Hilton Bloomington	6,118
July 2 – July 5, 2015	DoublePlusGood	Dystopias	DoubleTree by Hilton Bloomington	6,057
June 30 – July 3, 2016	... And How Do We GET There?	Vehicles and transportation	DoubleTree by Hilton Bloomington	5,693
July 6 – July 9, 2017	To Infinity And Beyond	Space opera	DoubleTree by Hilton Bloomington	6,477
July 5 – July 8, 2018	Natural Twenty	Anniversary of 20th CONvergence	DoubleTree by Hilton Bloomington	5,785
July 4 – July 7, 2019	The Next Celebration	Reboots and re-imaginings in Science Fiction	Hyatt Regency Minneapolis	5,571
August 5 – August 8, 2021	The Stuff of Legends	Legends and mythology	Hyatt Regency Minneapolis	2,430
August 11 – August 14, 2022	Your Reality May Vary	Parallel universes in fiction	Hyatt Regency Minneapolis	2,735
July 6 – July 9, 2023	All Dressed Up	Costume and Cosplay	Hyatt Regency Minneapolis	3,554
July 4 – July 7, 2024	Everyone's Invited	Diversity, equity, and inclusion	Hyatt Regency Minneapolis	4,154
July 3 – July 6, 2025	That's How We Roll	Gaming	Hyatt Regency Minneapolis	4,306
July 2 – July 5, 2026	The Geek in the Machine	Robots, cyborgs, and androids	Hyatt Regency Minneapolis	4,512
July 1 – July 4, 2027	Here Be Dragons	High Fantasy	Hyatt Regency Minneapolis	

== Reception ==
View source data.

In 2008, CONvergence was voted "Best Fan Convention" by the City Pages arts/alternative newspaper. It has appeared in "Best of the Cities" in each year afterward until 2011 (when no award was given for "best fan convention" or "best annual convention").

=== Transition to Minneapolis ===
Convention organizer Convergence Events, Inc. sent an announcement to Convergence members on June 16, 2018. The announcement indicated changes to the party rooms at the 2018 convention, due to concerns from the hotel management.

On the same day, Convergence Events, Inc. announced that the following year's convention would be hosted at the Hyatt Regency Minneapolis in downtown Minneapolis, Minnesota, after being hosted in the same Bloomington location since 2001.
