= Kobolds Ate My Baby! =

Independently published role-playing game

- Designers: Chris O'Neill, Dan Landis, Bug Boll, Jon "The Kobold Dude" Maness; illustrations by John Kovalic
- Publishers: Dork Storm Press; 9th Level Games
- Publication: 2024 (The Orange Book); 2005 (Super Deluxx Edition); 2001 (3rd edition); 1999 (1st printing)
- Genres: Fantasy, Comedy
- Systems: BEER_Engine_(game_system) polymorph™

Kobolds Ate My Baby! (also known as KAMB) is an independently published role-playing game from 9th Level Games, a small-press publisher and designer of humorous role-playing games (RPGs) based in Pennsylvania. The name is a derivative reference to the Azaria Chamberlain disappearance and the famous misquote, "A dingo ate my baby!" The Super Deluxx Edition was still designed by 9th Level Games but is published by Dork Storm Press.

== Game play ==
The players assume the roles of kobolds, creatures who are often used as weak but numerous "cannon fodder" characters in fantasy role-playing games such as Dungeons & Dragons. KAMB supposedly refutes this role, while at the same time playing up this and other stereotypes of fantasy role-playing. The game takes a generally humorous look at the genre and encourages joking and ludicrous, boisterous behavior among the players, the chief of which is the rule that whenever the name of the kobolds' king, Torg (All Hail King Torg!), is mentioned, all present are required to loudly proclaim, "ALL HAIL KING TORG!"

KAMB is played using the dice rolling mechanism called the Beer Engine. It is called Beer after the four stats that make each character: Brawn, Ego, Extraneous, and Reflexes. Essentially, players are given a difficulty in numbers of dice, and they must roll under the appropriate value on their sheet. Kobolds being poorly suited to adventuring have low numbers, which keeps the humour alive in the game.

In 2024 "Kobolds Ate My Baby! The Orange Book" by Bug Boll, Jon "The Kobold Dude" Manass, and Chris O'Neill was released. The new edition uses a version of 9th Level Games' polymorph™ system. Still only using six sided dice, players choose an "action," EAT, FEET, MEAT, or BEAT, than roll their d6 and compare the results to a "Resolver". The humor and goals of the game remain the same.

KAMB is part of an annual event at the Origins Game Fair called the Midnight Massacre, in which large numbers of people customarily play multiple simultaneous games of KAMB and make significant amounts of noise. In 2005, the Midnight Massacre was staged as a LARP.

== 9th Level Games ==
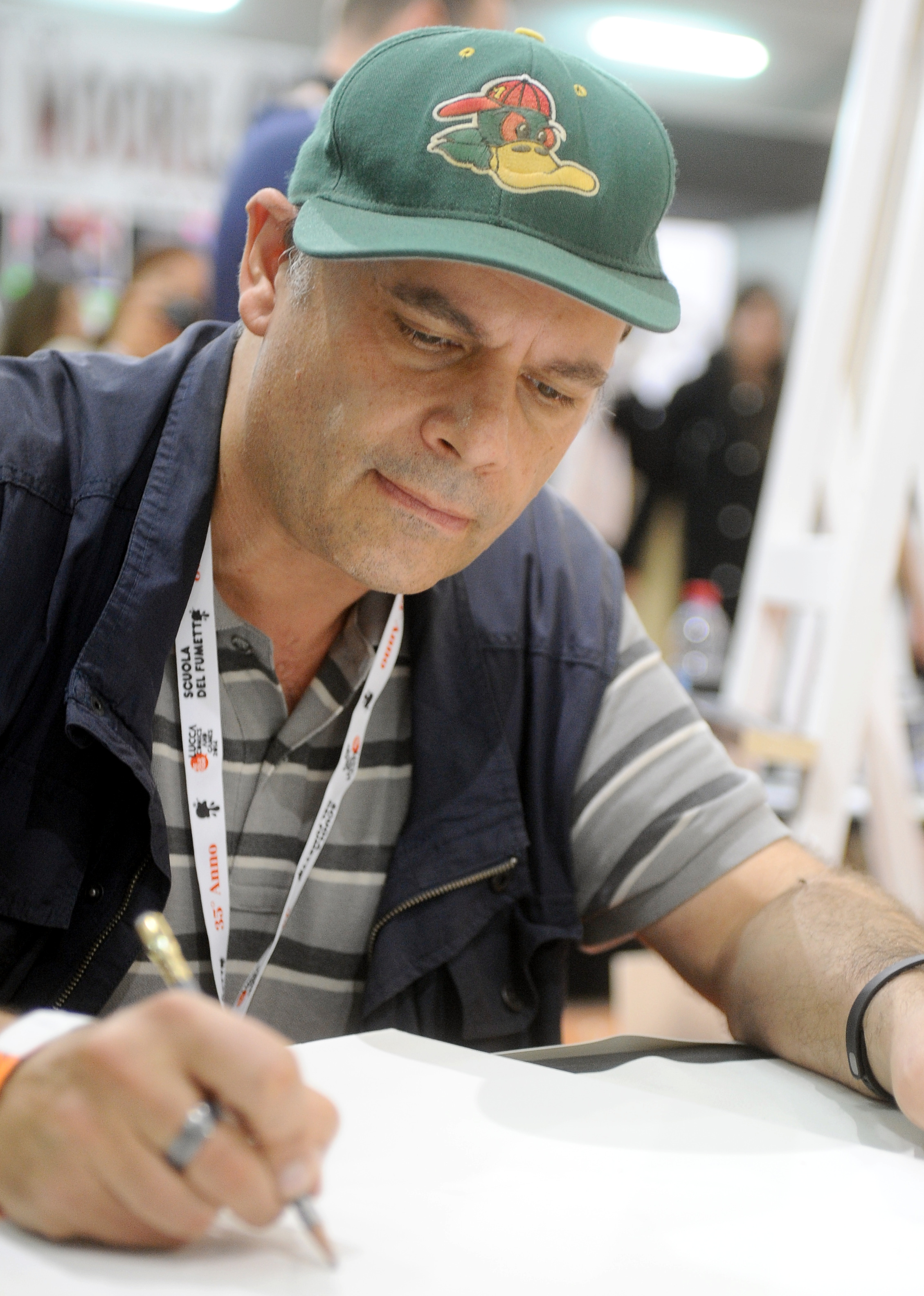
The "Super Deluxx Edition" features illustrations by John Kovalic.

The company was founded by Dan Landis and Chris O'Neill while in high school together. As of 2001, the company had four employees, including the founders. 9LG's first games were Adventure! The W¸rlde of Kroson and In the Company of Rats, introduced at Origins 1999; these was followed by KAMB, developed in one month for Gen Con 1999.

Currently, 9th Level Games is transitioning out publishing to focus primarily on design. In December 2005, Dork Storm Press (DSP) released Kobolds Ate My Baby! Super Deluxx Edition, a game that was designed by 9LG and published by DSP. This edition features illustrations by John Kovalic, the creator of Dork Tower.

On March 4, 2013, 9th Level initiated a 30-day Kickstarter campaign to raise funds for a new printing of KAMB. Aiming for a pledge target of $11,000, the fundraiser earned $65,817 in total, meeting and exceeding all "stretch goals" for the fundraiser, including a related printing of a Munchkin booster pack based on the game.

== Reviews and awards ==
KAMB has received many industry and independent accolades. The publication Games Quarterly listed KAMB as one of the top 10 funniest games (non-electronic) released in the last few years. Similarly KAMB was chosen as one of "the 50 Funniest Games of All Time" and the "Weirdest RPG Ever" by Inquest Magazine.

In a review of Kobolds Ate My Baby! Super Deluxx Edition in Black Gate, Ryan Harvey said "Even if you never actually sit down and play Kobolds Ate My Baby! during some late night with plenty of Pabst on hand and bags of cheap generic pretzels laying about (this game would be a sumptuous blast in Bavaria!), I still think most fantasy gamers will get a thrill from reading the Super Deluxx Edition and getting out of the Forbidden Realms for a while to enjoy having cows drop from the sky and crush their characters into tartar sauce."

Reviewer, author and critic Ken Hite said in his review that he "loved it" and praised its humor and solid game mechanic.

A reviewer on RPGnet review site called it "a game of comic genius" and gave it 5 stars out of 5 for both style and substance.

Reviewer Matthew Pook said that "the game itself is amusingly written, and of course, it includes opportunities aplenty for the Mayor [the Gamemaster] to be rotten to his Kobold players. Just as they will be rotten to each other in the scramble to gain Victory Points. In this, it shares some similarity with Paranoia."

Kobolds Ate My Baby – The Orange Book was nominated for the 2024 ENNIE Awards for Best Game and Best Writing.
