= Lethargic Lad =

Comic strip

- Author: Greg Hyland
- Website: http://www.lethargiclad.com/
- Current status/schedule: Weekly
- Genre(s): Parody, Superhero

Lethargic Lad is a protagonist in the comic strip of the same name, created by Greg Hyland sometime in the late 1980s. The character is notable for being very slow and inactive. Lethargic Lad does not speak, though he sometimes mutters "Umm...".

== Comics ==
Lethargic Lad is the name of both a comic and a comic book character created by Canadian artist Greg Hyland. Hyland created the character in high school as a doodle, and beginning in 1988, he featured the character in a photocopied anthology mini-comic called Lethargic Comics Weakly. This anthology, which was rounded out with contributions from fellow animation students (and one instructor) at Sheridan College, lampooned superhero comics, and was sold to local animation and comics fans.

In June 1991, Lethargic Comics Weakly restarted its continuity in an internationally distributed, professional format independent black and white comic, which ran for 12 issues until June 1993. This was followed by the spin-off Tales of Lethargy, which ran for three issues beginning in August 1993, and featured "Gun Guy, Ghost Guy, and Guy With Claws." Publishing began again in January 1994 under the new title Lethargic Comics, which ran for 15 issues through June 1996. In June 1996, a three issue mini-series was released that dropped the anthology style of the comic. In a testament to the character's intense cult following, the cover to issue #3 of this mini-series was painted by Alex Ross as a parody of the DC Comics Kingdom Come series, which Ross himself had illustrated.

Lethargic Lad Adventures launched in October 1997. This series lasted 13 issues, being renamed Lethargic Lad with the third issue. The series featured an innovation: the actual story in the comic began right on the cover.

In April 2000, Greg Hyland launched lethargiclad.com and moved from doing a print comic book to doing a weekly webcomic, with each month's collection of webcomics considered one "issue." Some of these webcomics have been reprinted in irregular "jumbo-sized annuals" put out by John Kovalic's Dork Storm (publisher of the gaming satire/humor comic Dork Tower). More recently, books collecting the online webcomics have been put out by Mr. Hyland himself.

Currently, Lethargic Lad is a weekly webcomic posted on Sunday.

Greg Hyland has occasionally taken off time for other projects, as well as for the birth of his daughter.

Other projects include providing production art for licensed LEGO brand product and doing storyboarding for their animated shorts. Greg has worked in the past for Nelvana on such cartoons as Beetlejuice (TV series). He has also worked as an illustrator and colorist for Steve Jackson Games on card games including Munchkin Fu and its expansion Munchkin Fu – Monky Business, Ninja Burger, and Burn In Hell.

The Lethargic Lad universe has many supporting and recurring characters lampooning much of the Marvel and DC catalogues.

Lethargic Lad Timeline:

1. Lethargic Comics, Weakly (minis) #1–60 (1988–1991)
2. Lethargic Comics, Weakly #1–12 (1991–1993)
3. Tales of Lethargy #1–3 (1993)
4. ''Lethargic Comics #1–3, #3.14, #4–14 (1994–1996)
5. Lethargic Lad #1–3 (1996)
6. Lethargic Lad Adventures #1–2 (1997), continued as Lethargic Lad.
7. Lethargic Lad #3–13 (1998–1999), continued from Lethargic Lad Adventures.
8. The Big Book of Lethargic Lad (1998), collects stories from Lethargic Comics, Weakly (1991–1993), Lethargic Comics (1994–1996), and the Lethargic Lad mini-series (1996).
9. Lethargic Lad Jumbo-Sized Annual #1–3 (2002–2005) (various online strips)
10. Lethargic Lad: Topics of Unclear Importance (2007), collects online strips from 2000–2007.
11. Lethargic Lad 2007 (2008), collects online strips from 2007.
12. Lethargic Lad 2008 (2009), collects online strips from 2008.
13. Lethargic Lad 2009 (2010), collects online strips from 2009.
14. Lethargic Lad 2010 (2011), collects online strips from 2010.
15. Lethargic Lad 2011 (2012), collects online strips from 2011.
16. Lethargic Lad 2012 (2013), collects online strips from 2012.
17. Lethargic Lad: Season One (2016), collects online strips from 2014–2016.
18. Lethargic Lad: Season One – Revised and Expanded 2017 Edition (2017), collects online strips from 2014–2017.
19. Lethargic Lad.com #1–735 (weekly online strips)

A Lethargic Lad backup comic, Lethargic Lad's Rogues Gallery, also appeared in Dork Tower from issues #16–36. These strips were collected in Lethargic Lad: Topics of Unclear Importance.

== Major characters ==
- Lethargic Lad – The main character of the series. He is the protector of Infantino City, a presumably large metropolis. He has the power of lethargy, and is always ready to save the day. His secret identity is Larry Ladhands, who is rich and lives in a mansion. Below his mansion is the Lad Cave, where he keeps his vehicles and gadgets.
- Sailor Steve – a male otaku who dresses in Sailor Moon outfits. Sailor Steve first appeared in Lethargic Lad #3. He frequents the trendy coffee shop, and Infantino city. He is an expert on Japan, even more so than some Japanese, especially about toys, movies, animation, and television. He is meant to be a satire on otaku in general.
