= Chez Geek =

Card game

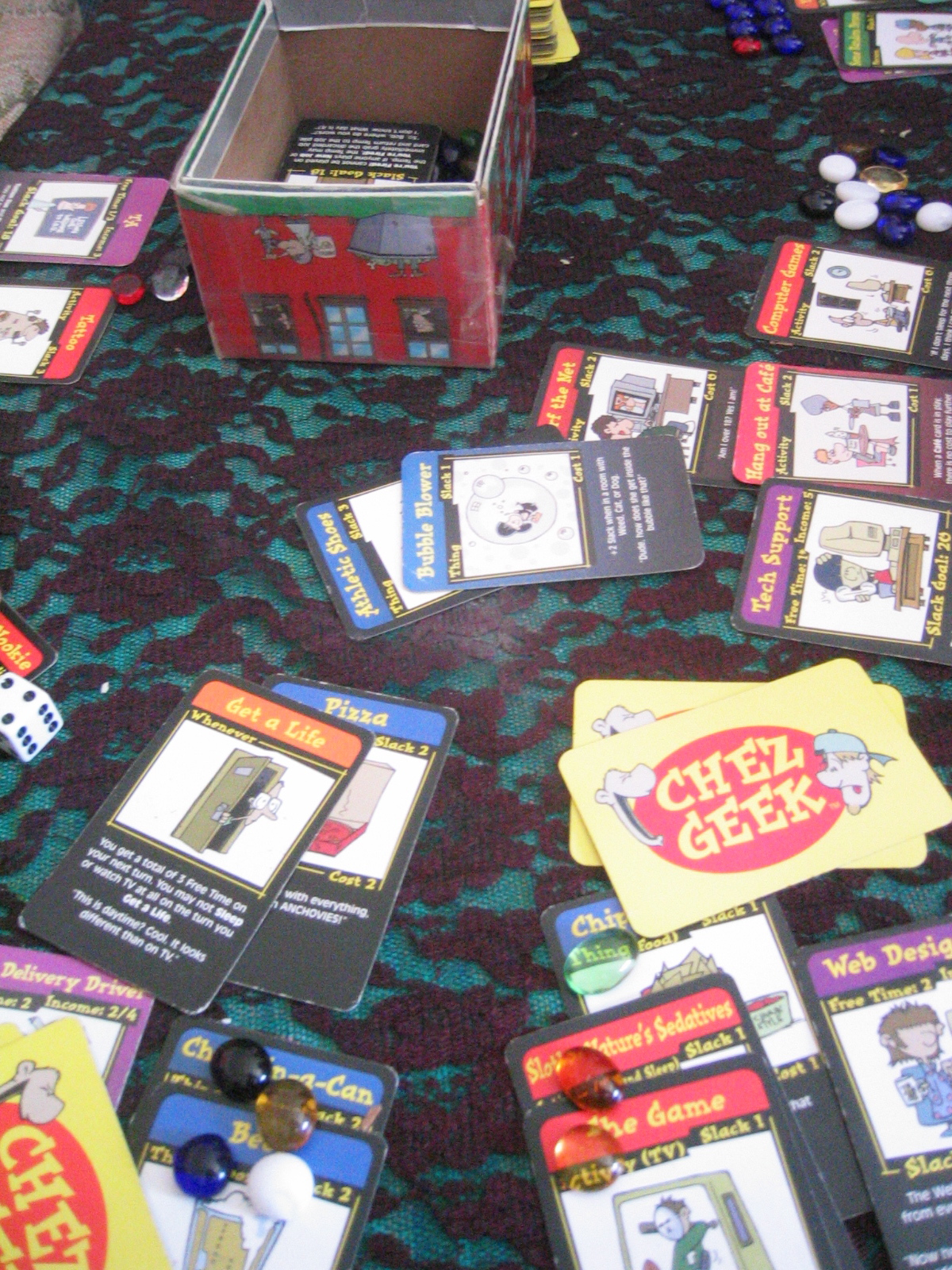
- Players invite people, buy things and do activities in order to be the roommate with the most Slack.
- Players: 2-5 (more with expansions)
- Setup time: 5 minutes
- Playing time: 45 minutes
- Chance: High
- Age range: 18+
- Skills: Dice rolling, Communication
- Earlier editions required you supply a six-sided die and a way of recording Slack totals, as they were not included. Later "Large Box" editions include a die and cardboard "Slack Counters".

Chez Geek is a card game that parodies geek culture and cohabitation. It was created by Jon Darbro and developed by Alain H. Dawson, with additional development by Steve Jackson and Russell Godwin. The cards and rules were illustrated by John Kovalic. Upon its release, the game won the Origins Award.

== Gameplay ==
Players play the role of roommates living together in a single multi-room apartment or other dwelling. At the start of the game, each player is dealt a Job card which lists free time, income, a special ability and a Slack goal. Players are also dealt five Life cards. The space in front of a player is their Room, where various cards are played during the game. Slack can be represented using any available chit or counter, but each player begins with a Slack total of zero.

Players take turns as follows:

1. Draw Life cards until they have six in hand. (NOTE: Some Jobs vary this to five or seven cards.)
2. Make "variable" rolls. Some Job cards have variable free time or income; their values for this turn are decided in this phase (rolling a 1-3 gives them the first amount; rolling a 4-6 gives them the second). A player may "get rid of" any "uninvited" people in a player's room (by rolling a 4, 5 or 6), and either send each such person to another room or discard them (if they cannot be played to any other room).
3. If any of the player's in-hand Life cards are green Person cards, they may roll to "call" the person to their room. A successful roll (3-6) gets them invited in; otherwise, they are discarded. Some people are "uninvited" (causing bad things to happen), and may be placed without a roll in any player's room. (See above for "getting rid of" these people.) Pet cards, such as Cats (which don't require a roll to enter a room) and Dogs (which may or may not need to be "called") can also be played in this round.
4. For each unit of free time the player's Job card gives them, they may perform one action (play a red Activity card) or go shopping (play any number of blue Thing cards). Some of these cards may have a cost; the total cost for all cards played in a round cannot exceed the income given to them by their Job card. (NOTE: Free Time and Income may be modified by certain Whenever cards played on the player by themselves or other players.)
5. At the end of a turn, if a player has more than five cards in hand, the player must discard cards until they have five or fewer. If desired, players can discard all the way down to one card. (NOTE: It is also legal for a player to play ALL the cards in their hand and have NO cards at the end of a turn.)

Additionally, some Life cards are orange Whenever cards which can be played at any time.

Activity cards and Thing cards typically list a Slack value which is added to the player's Slack total, though some have random Slack totals and some have Slack totals which vary during the game. TV Activity cards and some Whenever cards can be used to cancel cards as they are being played, and some cause previously-played cards to be discarded. Some cards add or subtract Slack from every player's total, while others cause a player to change their Job card (and hence Slack goal). Many cards alter the effects of other cards.

The first player whose Slack total equals or exceeds their Slack goal is the winner.

== Expansions ==
In addition to the original 112 card set, the following are available:

- Chez Geek 2 - Slack Attack: Adds 56 new cards and provides some clarifications of the rules.
- Chez Geek 3 - Block Party: Adds 56 new cards and a large box to house the combined 224-card set.

Each set includes a small number of blank-faced Life and Job cards, allowing players to create their own cards to add to the game.

In 2010, all three sets were combined into the re-released Chez Geek--House Party Edition, which featured a larger box, cards with reworked art backgrounds, a six-sided die and cardboard "Slack Tokens" for use in the game. As before, a small number of blank-faced cards are included. The set also includes four "Guest Cards"—two each from Chez Goth and Chez Cthulhu—with Chez Geek backs.

== Spinoffs ==
The game has also seen several stand-alone spinoffs. While these each add some new rules to the Chez Geek core, they are still (in Steve Jackson Games' words) "compatible with the original game" to some degree. (Usually, the game rules for each set have suggestions on how to combine its gameplay with the other sets.)

- Chez Greek: Chez Geek set in a Fraternity house/College atmosphere; uses Majors instead of Jobs, and Campus cards instead of Life cards. Also adds special "Week" Whenever cards which affect all players when played (Homecoming, Spring Break, Finals Week, etc.).
- Chez Grunt: Chez Geek set in the Army; uses MOS (Military Occupational Specialty) cards instead of Jobs, and Service cards instead of Life cards. (Notable in that cards that can ONLY be used in a straight Chez Grunt game are marked with white stars.) Grunt was developed by Alain H. Dawson and includes 112 cards.
- Chez Goth: Chez Geek with Goths; adds Gloom points, which are earned via tragic events, but can be lost if no one is in your Room (via the "Misery Loves Company" rule) or from special card plays. Gloom points count toward your Slack Goal. (Since re-released in same "large box" format as Chez Geek--House Party Edition and Chez Cthulhu, with reworked art cards, die and Slack & Gloom counters.)
- Chez Guevara: Chez Geek with revolutionaries; uses Ranks instead of Jobs. Also includes rules for Raids, Wounds/Healing, Pulling Rank and Promotion/Demotion. Due to these Rules additions, this is the LEAST compatible of the "Chez" games (rules suggest only using the Thing cards in/from other "Chez" games). This is also the only Chez game that does NOT have artwork by John Kovalic; the artist for this game is Greg Hyland.
- Chez Cthulhu: Chez Geek dips into the Lovecraft Mythos, with elements of the horror genre, and adds Madness points, which hinder you in small amounts, but help you in larger amounts. (First "Chez" game to be released in "large box" format, with six-sided die and Slack & Madness counters included.)
- Chez Dork: While it has a similar name and play mechanic to Chez Geek, this is a completely different game set in the world of the comic strip Dork Tower.

== Reception ==
In 2000, Chez Geek won the Origins Award for Best Traditional Card Game of 1999 and in 2003 the spinoff Chez Greek won Best Graphic Representation of a Card Game Product 2002.

In 2010, the reviewer for Polish magazine Komputer Świat positively reviewed the game, calling it a faster Munchkin. Also that year, a reviewer for the Poltergeist portal favorably commented on its speed and humor. Both reviewers noted that the Polish edition of the game seems a bit overpriced.
