= Out of the Box Publishing =

Game publisher

Out of the Box Publishing Inc.
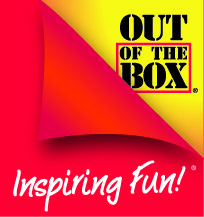
- Type: Privately held company
- Industry: Toys
- Founded: 1998 (Madison, Wisconsin)
- Defunct: October 2015
- Headquarters: Windsor, Wisconsin, United States
- Key people: Al Waller (President); Leah Sugar (Vice President of Marketing); Bridget Stitgen (CFO); Max Osterhaus (Director of Product development); Derek McCoy (Sales and Warehouse Manager)
- Number of employees: 5

Out of the Box Publishing was a Wisconsin-based publishing company specializing in family, card, and party games. As of October 2013, they had published over 45 titles.

Out of the Box Publishing was best known for games that are easy to learn and quick to play. The company has received numerous awards including Mensa Select, Toy of the Year, Parenting for High Potential, and National Parenting Center.

== History ==
Out of the Box Publishing was established in 1998 in Madison, Wisconsin by Mark Osterhaus, Ellen Winter, Alan Waller, Cathleen Quinn-Kinney, and John Kovalic. The first game published by the company was Bosworth, a four-player chess variant which has since been retired.

In the summer of 1998, Out of the Box Publishing acquired the license for their most well-known game, Apples to Apples, from inventor Matthew Kirby. Apples to Apples was redesigned into its current form by Mark Osterhaus and the content was created by Ellen Winter with help from their family: Leah Sugar, and Max Osterhaus. Over the next ten years, Out of the Box grew into a leading American game company, supplying games to thousands of specialty toy stores, Target, Walmart and Toys R Us, as well as distributing games worldwide. During this time, Out of the Box licensed and distributed games in more than 10 foreign countries (Germany, UK, Scandinavia, France, Australia, New Zealand, South Korea, and others) and amassed more than 15 awards for game design. While Out of the Box held the license for Apples to Apples, it produced and sold over three million copies.

In 2007, the company sold the licenses to Apples to Apples, Blink, Snorta and Qwitch to the Mattel Corporation, several owners retired, and several new owners (including children of the previous owners) were invited to join. Since the sale, Out of the Box had new growing games, such as Word on the Street, 7Ate9, and Snake Oil.

Out of the Box Publishing is no longer in business. They sold all of their remaining inventory and ceased operations in October 2015.

== Games ==
Out of the Box Publishing was best known for games that take less than five minutes to learn, and less than a half an hour to play. All Out of the Box games are family-oriented and appropriate for kids and adults. Their games have been called "surprisingly entertaining" and "silly fun", as well as "thought provoking and humorous".

Nearly all of the games in their catalog were created after 2008. The company received over 600 submissions a year and published about two new games per year.

== List of published games ==
- 10 Days in Africa (2003)
- 10 Days in Asia (2006)
- 10 Days in Europe (2005)
- 10 Days in the Americas (2010)
- 10 Days in the USA (2003)
- 7Ate9 (2009)
- aBRIDGEd (2006)
- Apples to Apples (1999)
- Apples to Apples Button Men (2002)
- Apples to Apples Custom Cards (2002)
- Apples to Apples Kids (2000)
- Apples to Apples Party Box (2003)
- Apples to Apples Party Box Expansion One (2004)
- Apples to Apples Party Box Expansion Two (2004)
- Backseat Drawing (2008)
- Backseat Drawing Junior (2009)
- Basari (2003)
- Blink (2005) re-release
- Bosworth (1998)
- Bug Out (2011)
- Cineplexity (2006)
- Cloud 9 (2003)
- Cover Up (2006)
- Easy Come, Easy Go (2004)
- Fish Eat Fish (2003)
- Gavitt's Stock Exchange (2003)
- Gold Digger (2002)
- Harry's Grandslam Baseball (2004)
- Letter Roll (2009)
- LetterFlip! (2004)
- Mix Up (2006)
- My Word (2008) re-release
- Ninja versus Ninja (2008)
- Party Pooper (2008)
- Pepper (2006)
- Qwitch (2006) re-release
- Rock! (2008)
- Shipwrecked (2000)
- Snake Oil (2012)
- Snorta (2003)
- Squint (2002)
- Squint Jr. (2004)
- Super Circles (2009)
- The Chain Game (2008)
- Tutankhamen (2003)
- Wallamoppi (2004)
- Whad'Ya Know (2003)
- Wildside (2003)
- Word on the Street (2009)
- Word on the Street Junior (2010)
- Zen Benders (2008)

== Distributors ==
Out of the Box Games are distributed by:

- 999 Games (Netherlands)
- ACD (USA)
- Alfit (Israel)
- Alliance Game Distributors (USA)
- Amigo Spiel (Germany)
- Board Game Club (Hong Kong)
- Carant Entertainment (Mexico)
- Creative Fun (Singapore)
- Esdevium Games (UK)
- GTS Distribution (USA)
- Korea Boardgames (South Korea)
- Lion Rampant Imports (Canada)
- Logical Toys (New Zealand)
- LU2 Experts en Jocs de Taula (Spain)
- My Games (India)
- Paradigm Infinitum (Singapore)
- Pegasus Spiele (Germany)
- Phantasia (Taiwan)
- Ravensburger Spielverlag (Germany)
- Rootstem Co. (South Korea)
- Spilavinir (Iceland)
- Sunset Games (Japan)
- Swan Panasia (Taiwan)
- Vennoroed (Norway)
- Ventura (Australia)
- Wargames HK (Hong Kong)

== Trivia ==
The artistic director and one of the founders of Out of the Box Publishing, John Kovalic, was also the illustrator for Munchkin and Dork Tower.
