= Rotten Apples (card game) =

Rotten Apples is a card game played by two or more players. The game is developed by No Kidding Pty Ltd. It shares some similarities to Apples to Apples but is aimed at older gamers.

== Equipment ==
The game uses a small deck of brown cards, and a large deck of green cards. Each brown card contains a sentence with a missing word. The green cards contain random words that are used to fill the missing word.

== Game play ==
The players are dealt ten green cards each. The player whose birthday is on or closest to January 4 becomes the judge. The judge picks a brown card, and reads the sentence written on it. The other players pick a green card from their hand with an answer they believe fits the sentence before passing them face down to the judge. The judge then shuffles the green cards then reads them. The answer does not have to be logical but rather something the judge finds comical. The player whose answer is chosen wins the round, keeps the brown card of that round, and becomes the new judge. Play continues until a player earns a certain number (usually 3) of brown cards.
