= John Kovalic =

American cartoonist

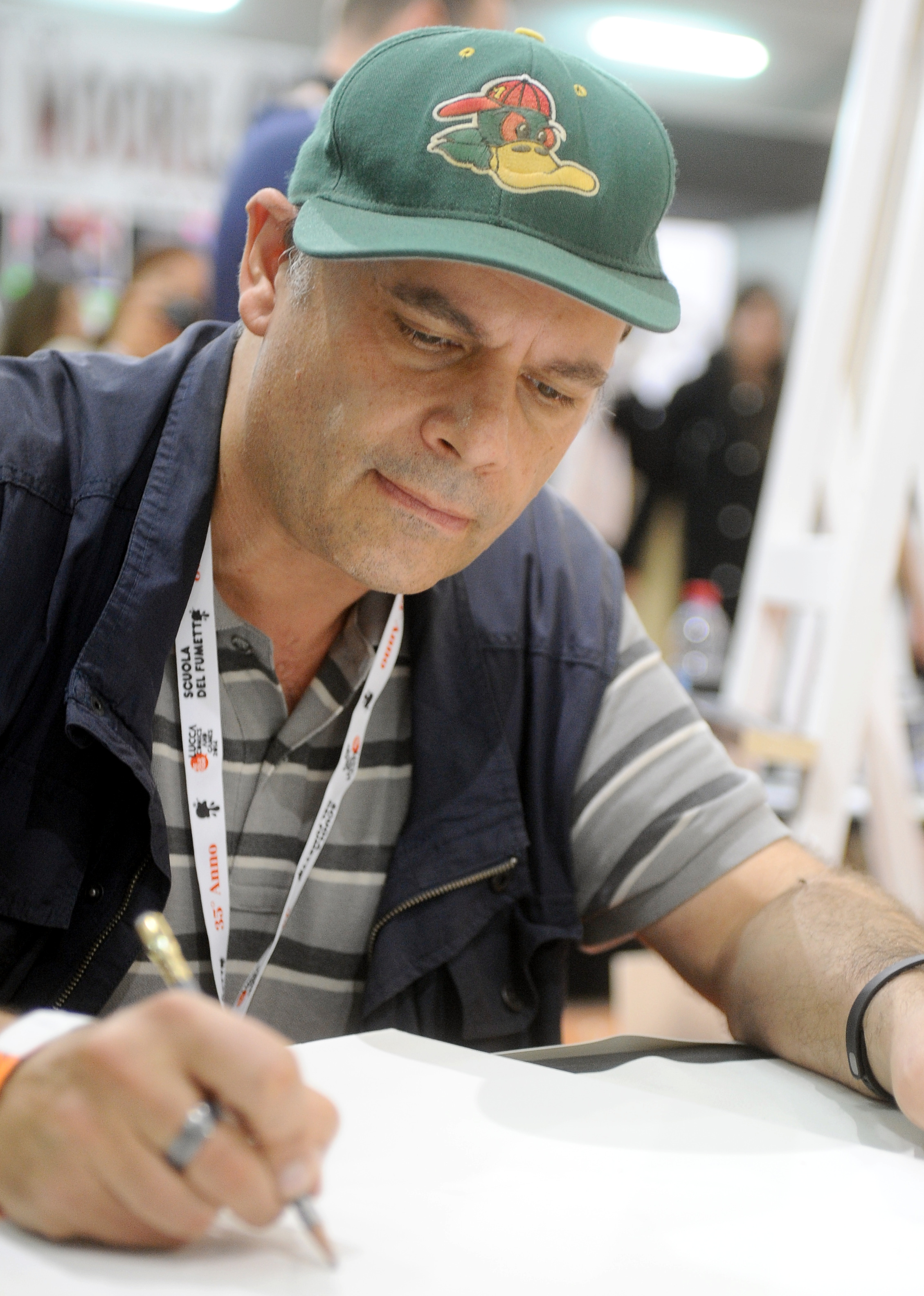
- Kovalic at Lucca Comics & Games in 2014
- Born: 24 November 1962 (age 63); Manchester, England
- Occupations: Cartoonist, illustrator, and writer
- Spouse: Judith Heise
- Children: Lewis Robert-John Kovalic

John Kovalic (born Robert John Kovalic, Jr. on 24 November 1962) is an American cartoonist, illustrator, and writer.

== Career ==
Born in Manchester, England, Kovalic is best known for his Dork Tower comic book, comic strip, and webcomic, and other humorous work set in and about the fantasy role-playing game genre, such as The Unspeakable Oaf. He has illustrated board and card games for several companies, including Steve Jackson Games (notably the Munchkin card game, plus its many expansions and derivatives, and Chez Geek and its derivatives), Cumberland Games & Diversions (Pokéthulhu), and the third edition of Fantasy Flight Games's Mag Blast. He was also the sole illustrator for the "Super Deluxx" edition of Kobolds Ate My Baby! and has subsequently occasionally featured supplemental KAMB material in the Dork Tower comic book.

Kovalic is a co-founder and co-owner of Out of the Box Publishing. He is also the company's art director and designer of the 2003 trivia party game Whad'Ya Know?, based on Michael Feldman's Whad'Ya Know?, as well as the illustrator of Apples to Apples.

Kovalic is an editorial cartoonist for the Wisconsin State Journal. His work has appeared in The New York Times and The Washington Post, and he continues to freelance for Milwaukee's The Daily Reporter. He has also worked for CARtoons Magazine. He is also the writer of the comic Doctor Blink Superhero Shrink, which is penciled and inked by Christopher Jones and colored and lettered by Melissa Kaercher.

== Honors ==
Kovalic's cartoons are multi–Origins Award–winners and have been nominated for two Harvies—for best cartoonist and the special award for humor in comics. USA Today called Kovalic a "Hot Pick". In 2003, Kovalic became the first cartoonist inducted into the Academy of Adventure Gaming's Hall of Fame.

Kovalic has thrice been a guest of honor—in 2003, 2007, and 2008—at the science, science fiction, and fantasy convention CONvergence., and on multiple occasions at Warpcon in Cork, Ireland.

== List of games illustrated ==
Kovalic has provided illustrations for large number of games, including:

- 10 Days series
- aBRIDGEd
- Apples to Apples series
- Backseat Drawing
- Blink
- Bosworth
- Button Men: Dork Victory
- Cash n' Guns Second Edition
- Chain Game
- Chez Geek series
- Cineplexity
- Cloud 9
- Cover Up
- Creatures and Cultists
- Creepyfreaks
- Dork 20
- Dork Tower: The Boardgame
- Dungeonville
- Easy Come, Easy Go
- Escape from Elba
- Fish Eat Fish
- Gold Digger
- Illuminati: New World Order series
- Kobolds Ate My Baby!
- Letter Flip
- Letter Roll
- Mag Blast
- Mix Up
- Munchkin series
- Munchkin Quest
- My Dwarfs Fly
- My Word!
- Ninja Versus Ninja
- Nutty Cups
- Party Pooper
- Pepper
- PokeTHULHU
- Quitch
- Rock
- ROFL!
- Shape Up
- ShipWrecked
- Snorta
- Squint
- Tutankhamen
- Wallamoppi
- Warhamster Rally
- Whad'Ya Know?
- Wheedle
- ZenBenders series
