= The Hills Run Red =

The Hills Run Red may refer to:

- The Hills Run Red (1966 film), Italian spaghetti western
- The Hills Run Red (2009 film), American horror feature
