= Free Enterprise (film) =

- DVD cover for the film
- Directed by: Robert Meyer Burnett
- Written by: Robert Meyer Burnett; Mark A. Altman
- Produced by: Mark A. Altman; Dan Bates; Allan Kaufman
- Starring: Rafer Weigel; Eric McCormack; Audie England; Patrick Van Horn; Phil LaMarr; Jonathan Slavin; Deborah Van Valkenberg; William Shatner
- Cinematography: Charles L. Barbee
- Edited by: Robert Meyer Burnett
- Music by: Scott Spock
- Distributed by: Anchor Bay Entertainment
- Release date: June 4, 1999
- Running time: 114 minutes 121 minutes (Extended)
- Country: United States
- Language: English
- Box office: $30,229

Free Enterprise is a 1999 romantic comedy film starring Eric McCormack and Rafer Weigel, and featuring William Shatner, directed by Robert Meyer Burnett and written by Mark A. Altman and Burnett.

== Plot ==
The film deals with the mid-life crises of its two main protagonists, Mark (Eric McCormack) and Robert (Rafer Weigel), fictionalized versions of the film's director and producer/writer. The two friends struggle with adult career and relationship problems, all the while defiantly clinging to the geeky science fiction popular culture of their youth and seeking advice from their greatest hero, William Shatner.

Shatner plays a campy caricature of himself as he works on a one-man musical version of Julius Caesar in hopes of finally being taken seriously as a dramatist and musical performer. Hip-hop artist "The Rated R", joined by Shatner, provides the concluding musical number "No Tears for Caesar", a pastiche of famous lines from the play set to a rap rhythm. The film's score was produced by Scott Spock.

== Cast ==
- Eric McCormack as Mark
- Rafer Weigel as Robert
  - Spencer Klein as young Robert
- Audie England as Claire
- William Shatner as Bill
- Phil LaMarr as Eric
- Deborah Van Valkenburgh as Marlena
- Thomas Hobson as Richard
- Jennifer Sommerfield as Tricia
- Jonathan Slavin as Dan
- Patrick Van Horn as Sean
- Lori Lively as Leila
- Holly Gagnier as Laura Hafermann
- Ellie Cornell as Suzanne Crawford
- Marilyn Kentz as Gail, Mark's mom
- Diana Cignoni as Illa
- Sharon Leibowitz as Sharon
- Daniel Schweiger as Schweiger
- Mickey Cassidy as Bully

== Production ==
Kay Reindl, a friend of Mark A. Altman and Robert Meyer Burnett, and a television writer on Millennium and The Twilight Zone, felt that they could make a film out of their clique's obsession with Star Trek. Burnett remembered that one day Altman called him and read a scene where he was beaten up in junior high school for wearing a Trek uniform. William Shatner appeared to him as a vision and told him to fight back. Altman wrote the first draft and then Burnett rewrote it.

When Altman and Burnett approached Shatner about being in Free Enterprise, he was not interested: "I had played my [Kirk] persona as far as I wanted to go and probably as far as anybody wants me to go." Undaunted, Altman and Burnett tweaked his character to be more like Peter O'Toole's in My Favorite Year. They also incorporated several anecdotes from Shatner's actual life.

== Release ==
Free Enterprise had a tiny theatrical release in only nine Los Angeles theaters in 1998 with little promotion. Burnett said, "Nobody went to see it. It was really disheartening". In his review for the Los Angeles Times, Kevin Thomas said that the film brought "new life into the Hollywood-set romantic comedy genre" and was "funny, sharp and engaging". The L.A. Weekly said it was a "very funny, likable comedy about geeks in love". In her review for the Washington Post, Jen Chaney praised "the often funny and, strangely enough, sometimes touching performance by Shatner."

== Reception ==
Rotten Tomatoes gives the film a score of 83% based on reviews from 23 critics.

== Awards ==
The film won four awards, including the 2000 Saturn Award for Best Home Video Release. A new 2-disc DVD special edition Free Enterprise: Extended "Five Year Mission" Edition was released on March 7, 2006.

== Popular culture references ==
The film is laced with references to past and contemporary science-fiction films and television series, such as Star Wars and Logan's Run. Most prominent is Star Trek: The Original Series, which is treated by the protagonists as a source of inspiration and moral guidance. Free Enterprise explores the dating scene for late Generation X Hollywood singles from a decidedly sardonic perspective. The credits are laced with references and spoilers.

== Soundtrack ==
The original motion picture soundtrack for Free Enterprise was released on June 15, 1999 by Nettwerk Records under the Unforscene Music imprint.

1. Jerry Van Rooyen – The Great Robbery
2. Frankie Goes to Hollywood – Welcome to the Pleasuredome
3. David Garza – Glow in the Dark
4. Bertine Zetlitz – Apples and Diamonds
5. Sumack – Metaphysical
6. Duran Duran – Planet Earth
7. Weed – If Only U Could See
8. Shriekback – Underwaterboys
9. Madeleine Peyroux – (Getting Some) Fun Out of Life
10. Povi – Dragonflies
11. Manufacture feat. Sarah McLachlan – As The End Draws Near
12. The Cult – She Sells Sanctuary
13. William Shatner, Rated R – No Tears for Caesar
14. (Unlisted Bonus Track) William Shatner – William Shatner's Self-Effacing Tale

== Sequel ==
A sequel called Free Enterprise: The Wrath of Shatner was in pre-production. Interviewed at Comic-Con 2011, director Robert Meyer Burnett admitted that earlier in the year, funding for the sequel was pulled two days before filming, but says that the project is not dead.

== See also ==
- Trekkies
