= Bosworth (game) =

Board game

- Manufacturers: Out of the Box Publishing
- Publication: 1998; 28 years ago
- Genres: Chess variant

Bosworth is a four-handed chess variant manufactured by Out of the Box Publishing company since 1998. It is played on 6x6 board and uses 4 sets of standard chess pieces.

Instead of traditional chess pieces, the "kingdoms" are represented by pictures of the pieces on large colored tokens, (each player has his own color: red, yellow, green, or blue), accompanied by a humorous picture of a Dork Tower character.

== Rules ==
The game can be played by two to four players, pieces act like their normal chess counterparts (i.e. rooks move vertically and horizontally), with minor exceptions. Due to the multi-player nature of the game, there is no checkmate and kings can be captured. The goal of the game is to be the last player who still has a king.

Bosworth has certain rules for game set-up and placing new pieces on the board. The game board has 36 squares, in a 6x6 pattern, but the four corner squares are marked by trees, which designate the squares as impassable, and the remaining four squares between the trees on each side are marked by tents and are the "camps" of the pieces.

At the start of the game each player takes his tokens, puts four pawns in his spawn camp, and shuffles the remaining tokens face down into a deck. From there the player draws four tokens from the top of the deck, and chooses from these tokens to replace empty spots in their spawn camp. The player must then draw enough pieces from the deck to get four in their hand.

== Reception ==
The reviewer from the online second volume of Pyramid stated that "Take Chess, the classic game that all of us in gaming grew up playing. Add in some whimsical art by industry veteran (and Murphy's Rules artist) John Kovalic. Stir in a healthy dose of playing cards. Mix thoroughly. What you get is Bosworth, "The Game You Already Know How to Play.""

== Reviews ==
- Backstab #11

== See also ==
- Forchess
