= Munchkin Cthulhu =

Munchkin Cthulhu is a 2007 expansion set published by Steve Jackson Games for Munchkin. It received numerous expansions starting from the year 2008 onward.

== Gameplay ==
Munchkin Cthulhu is a supplement in which Lovecraftian horror is parodied as players battle monsters, grab treasure, and race to reach level 10 before losing their sanity—or their loot.

== Reviews ==
- Rebel Times #6 (base game)
- Rebel Times #14 (expansions 2 and 3)
- Rebel Times #32 (comparison with other Cthulhu-themed games)
- Rebel Times #51 (base game)
- Świat Gier Planszowych #24
