= John Campea =

Canadian film critic (born 1972)

- Born: Giovanni Bertone Campea; 26 February 1972 (age 54); Halifax, Nova Scotia, Canada
- Education: Niagara College; Tyndale University
- Occupations: YouTuber, film critic, media host, writer, producer, editor
- Years active: 2003–present
- Spouse: Ann Campea (m. 2010)

Giovanni Bertone "John" Campea (born 26 February 1972), is a Canadian YouTuber, film critic, media critic, director, writer, producer, and editor. Campea founded and ran the film website The Movie Blog from June 2003 to December 2009. He then went on to become the editor-in-chief of AMC Movie News from September 2008 to June 2015. Shortly after that he was hired by Complex to run Collider Movie Talk beginning in July 2015. During his time there, he served as senior producer, host and showrunner of all of the programs. He resigned twice, once in January 2016, but returned in September of that year, and left permanently in June 2017. After he resigned, he began to release videos on his YouTube channel. As of October 2025, he has over 364,000 subscribers and over 402 million total views.

== Career ==
Campea started his career for Beagle Productions and later as client services director for Satellite Studios, a visual effects and 3D animation studio whose work appeared in a number of films, including Spy Kids 2: The Island of Lost Dreams, The League of Extraordinary Gentlemen, The One, and Frank Miller's Sin City. Then after his time working as visual effects artist, he began to work at a law firm for three years.

In 2003, he founded The Movie Blog, a film website offering daily editorials and differing commentary on current movies, movie news, and the film industry. The Movie Blog eventually became a full-time occupation for Campea. In 2006, Campea and then-co-host Doug Nagy won a Bloggie for "Podcast of the Year" for The Movie Blog's podcast show Uncut.

He quit The Movie Blog in late 2009 to focus on developing the news site for AMC called AMC Movie News, but returned for a short time in 2012.

=== Filmmaking ===
In 2008, Campea released his first documentary film, Prince of Peace: God of War, that examined the stark contrasts between the pro-war and pro-pacifism movements within the Christian church. It played at several film festivals in North America and received favorable reviews. He completed filming his first feature film, The Anniversary, in 2009. Campea now runs his own production company, Carson Drive Media (named after his childhood street in Hamilton, Ontario), and released his second documentary in November 2020, titled Movie Trailers: A Love Story.

=== Comic-Con Masters of the Web ===
In 2011, Campea took over the annual "Masters of the Web" panel at San Diego Comic-Con. The panel serves as a discussion on the film industry and the world of film blogging and journalism online. Each year Campea hosts the panel with major online film personalities. The panel has also had several special celebrity guests over the years including Stan Lee, Edgar Wright, Karl Urban, Roberto Orci and others.

=== AMC Movie News ===
Campea was Editor-in-Chief of AMC Movie News and the creator and host of such shows as AMC Movie Talk, AMC Jedi Council (an all Star Wars talk show), AMC Mail Bag, AMC Versus, AMC Coming Soon and AMC Spoilers. Their main show, AMC Movie Talk, won the 2014 International Academy of Web Television (IAWTV) award for "Best News Series". The AMC Movie News YouTube channel has its videos viewed over 5 million times per month and continues to grow. Campea announced his resignation as editor-in-chief of AMC Movie News in May 2015, but continued to appear on the show through the subsequent few weeks of June 2015.

=== Collider ===
In July 2015, Campea announced that he had joined Collider, and that most of the previous web shows that aired on AMC's YouTube channel, would end their association with AMC and transition to Collider's channel, with AMC Theatres remaining as a sponsor. On February 17, 2016, Campea had announced on that day's episode of Collider Movie Talk that he had resigned from Collider, and explained his future plans in the industry. Campea continued to be a guest on both Collider Jedi Council and Collider Heroes, returning as host and showrunner of Collider Movie Talk in September 2016. However, Campea left Collider once again in June 2017, citing creative differences in the direction of the channel, to work on other projects, including his personal YouTube channel.

=== Author ===
On September 4, 2015, Campea launched a Kickstarter campaign to publish a book he wrote called The Pride. The campaign met its goal several days later. On February 13, 2016, Campea announced through the book's Kickstarter page that the novel was finished. The Kindle edition of The Pride was released on February 29, 2016, with a physical copy going on sale at a later date.

=== The John Campea Show and Mailbag ===
After leaving Collider, Campea started his own independent film talk and news show, similar to Movie Talk on Collider, on his own personal YouTube channel that airs weekdays, as well as companion videos answering missed fan questions and live streams. Until November 2021, Robert Meyer Burnett and Erin Cummings appeared as co-hosts on the show on most weekdays and Thursdays, respectively. As of September 2022 he is joined weekdays by Burnett (most weekdays), Cummings (on some Wednesdays), voice actress Kris Carr (on Wednesdays and Fridays), actress Amy Newman (on Thursdays and Fridays) and Ray Ora who is his brother-in-law and a graphic designer. Jonathan Voytko rejoined the show in May 2022 as a producer, having previously worked as an editor/technical director on AMC Movie Talk and Collider projects; in his time with Campea, he earned the nickname "Fact Checker Jonathan". By July 2022, his own channel has amassed over 296,000 subscribers. In November 2021, Campea received criticism after accidentally leaking alleged photos from Spider-Man: No Way Home. The film's release has since confirmed the validity of the images.

In February 2022, Campea revived the Mailbag feature, effectively replacing the previous TJCS companion videos. The format is similar to the companion videos, however, the show takes questions submitted 24/7 from fans tipped via Streamlabs, as opposed to the main show’s questions being taken exclusively from YouTube’s Super Chat function. As of March 2022, the show is hosted by Campea or Burnett 2–3 times a week, with the first edition of Mailbag airing on February 1, 2022 and ended in August 2022. Campea also co-hosts a weekly show with Burnett and competitive swimmer Cody Miller titled Best Movie Worst Movie, focusing on a different topic each week.

In May 2023, Campea decided to end the live-streamed aspect of TJCS (except for channel members) and turn the podcast into an audio-only podcast, drawing criticism from other critics, fans, and viewers. Campea later reversed this decision, making the show initially available to non-members with a delay from June 2023 and live again from October 2023.

=== Open Mic ===
As of 2018, in addition to The John Campea Show, Open Mic was also included as a daily, live, viewer submitted question forum. Described by Campea as a "virtual watercooler", it focuses on wide-ranging live chat discussion. On the October 29, 2020 episode of The John Campea Show, Campea announced that Open Mic was moved to a podcast exclusive, available with the flagship program on any podcasting network. In August 2022, it was announced that Open Mic would be returning to the John Campea YouTube channel.

== Filmography ==
=== Film ===
Year	Title	Notes
2001	The One	Visual effects artist
2002	Spy Kids 2: The Island of Lost Dreams	Visual effects artist
2003	The League of Extraordinary Gentlemen	Visual effects artist
2005	Sin City	Visual effects artist
2007	Prince of Peace: God of War	Director, producer, writer, editor
2008	The Incredible Hulk	Extra (uncredited)
2009	The Anniversary	Director, producer, writer
2020	Movie Trailers: A Love Story	Director, producer, writer, editor

=== Web ===
Year	Title	Role	Notes
2003–2009	The Movie Blog	Himself	Editor
2011	For Your Consideration	Himself	Host
2012–15	AMC Movie Talk	Himself (host)	Executive producer
2015–17	Collider Movie Talk	Himself	Senior producer
2015–17	Collider Heroes	Himself (guest)	
2015–17	Collider Jedi Council	Himself (guest)	
2016–17	Movie Trivia Schmoedown	Himself (contestant/commentator)	
2017–present	The John Campea Show	Himself (host)	Executive producer
2017–2019; 2022–2023	The Weekly Hero	Himself (host) and Robert Meyer Burnett (2018) and onto just Burnett, with new co-host Kris Carr (2022)	
2018–2020	Open Mic	Himself (host)	Moved to podcast exclusive in October 2020
2018–2020	Play and Chat	Himself (host)	
2019	Dark Side Light Side	Himself and Kristian Harloff (host)	
2022	The John Campea Show Mailbag	Himself (host)	Started February 2022

== Awards and nominations ==
Year	Award	Category	Work	Result
2006	Blog Award	Podcast of the Year	The Movie Blog	Won
2014	International Academy of Web Television	Best News Series	AMC Movie Talk	Won
2014	International Academy of Web Television	Best Host (Live)	AMC Movie Talk	Nominated
2014	Geekie Award	Best Podcast	AMC Movie Talk	Nominated
2015	International Academy of Web Television	Best Live Series	AMC Movie Talk	Won
2015	International Academy of Web Television	Best Live Host	AMC Movie Talk	Nominated
2015	International Academy of Web Television	Best Pre-recorded Host	AMC Mailbag	Nominated
2018	International Academy of Web Television	Best Live Series	The John Campea Show	Won
2018	International Academy of Web Television	Best Host	The John Campea Show	Nominated
