= Robert Meyer Burnett =

American filmmaker

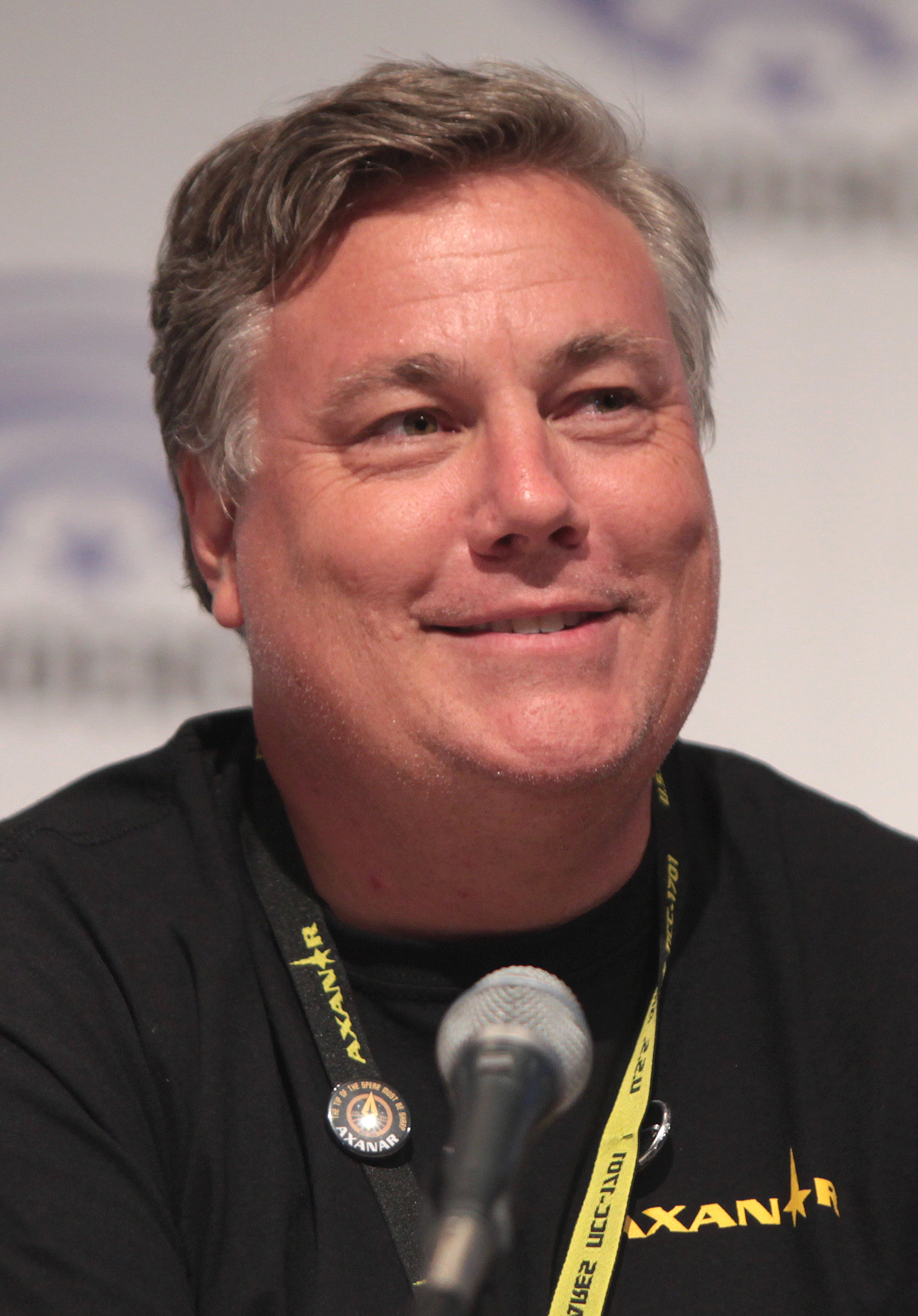
- Burnett at WonderCon 2015
- Born: May 15, 1967 (age 59); Seattle, Washington, U.S.
- Occupations: Filmmaker, Online film pundit and analyst YouTuber
- Political party: Democratic

Robert Meyer Burnett (born May 15, 1967) is an American filmmaker, DVD producer, online film pundit and YouTuber. Burnett directed Free Enterprise and the short film The Sacred Fire. He has also edited over ten feature films, and worked as a Star Trek consultant for Viacom Interactive and Paramount Parks' Star Trek: The Experience located at the Las Vegas Hilton.

Burnett has twice been a guest of honor at the science, science fiction, and fantasy convention, CONvergence.

== Early life ==
Burnett had a Jewish upbringing, and went to film school at the USC.

== Career ==
Burnett has worked in Hollywood since the summer of 1989, working his way up in the industry, producing diverse content, including online classes, physical media special features, television and motion pictures.

=== Producer ===
Beginning in the late 1990s, he began working as a "predator", a producer-editor, for television promotions. Beginning working with Star Wars fan film producer Kevin Rubio, Burnett created dozens of promos for the Kids WB programming block. Beginning in December 1999, he was hired full-time by NBC, creating over 100 spots for the 2000 Sydney Olympic Games. Dubbed "The Complete Olympics," it was the first time NBC broadcast the games over three platforms, NBC, MSNBC and CNBC. After the Olympics were aired, he continued on, creating spots for the 2000-2001 Prime Time season, including conceiving and even voicing the notorious XFL Cheerleader spots. In December 2000, he left NBC to join high-end content producers Kurtti-Pellerin, which exclusively created documentary special features for DVDs. Burnett produced extras for titles including The Walt Disney Company's The Fantasia Anthology and Snow White, and New Line Cinema's Extended Editions of Fellowship of the Ring and The Two Towers. He directed and edited the feature-length Making of Tron, which was nominated for the DVD Premiere Award for Original Retrospective Documentary at the 2003 DVD Exclusive Awards.

While still working at Kurtti-Pellerin, Burnett formed his own production company, Ludovico Technique. Ludovico worked on the DVD Special Editions for Oscar-winning The Usual Suspects, Valley Girl, Superman Returns, Spider-Man, X-Men 1.5, X2, and The Lion, the Witch and the Wardrobe. He edited, wrote and produced all the special features for the Blu-ray release of Star Trek: The Next Generation Complete Series box set released on June 7, 2016; he also contributed to the Blu-ray of all four seasons of Star Trek: Enterprise, with season four being released on April 1, 2014. Most recently, he, along with director Dave Parker, completed 6.5 hours of special features for the Blu-ray release of their film The Hills Run Red, released by Scream Factory on June 16, 2020. As a feature film producer, he co-produced Metro-Goldwyn-Mayer's Agent Cody Banks and its sequel, Agent Cody Banks 2: Destination London, and developed and produced the 2009 Warner Premiere and Dark Castle's The Hills Run Red. In 2021, Burnett completed producing and editing Tango Shalom, the last appearance of actor Joseph Bologna. After debuting in Jaipur, India, the film was theatrically released in the United States on September 3, 2021.

=== Writer/director ===
Burnett made his feature writing and directing debut with the 1999 award-winning film Free Enterprise, starring Eric McCormack and William Shatner, which he also edited. Beginning in 2010, Burnett has directed and edited five episodes of the TV series Femme Fatales.

=== Media critic ===
Burnett began his professional writing career as the "Critic at Large" for the Larry Flynt-published Sci-Fi Universe magazine in the mid-90s. He recently wrote an essay for a Blade Runner anthology, The Cyberpunk Nexus: Exploring the Blade Runner Universe, published by Sequart Organization, on July 10, 2018. He currently runs a successful YouTube channel and website both entitled The Burnettwork and presents his own show titled Robservations which provides in-depth online video analysis of new and classic TV and film.

Burnett is a regular contributor to the YouTube show of his friend and fellow filmmaker John Campea, titled The John Campea Show. In late March 2023, Meyer Burnett (jointly with Campea) announced that he would be stepping back from his involvement in The John Campea Show (whilst still making occasional appearances on it) to prioritise The Burtnettwork, with Campea agreeing to sponsor certain content for an initial period of a few months on The Burnettwork and vice versa. Burnett returned to the show weekdays in January 2025, albeit only present for the show's daily topic segments, after completing much of his work on the audio drama series True Noir: The Assassination of Anton Cermak.
