= Star Munchkin =

Star Munchkin is a 2002 expansion set published by Steve Jackson Games for Munchkin.

== Gameplay ==
Star Munchkin is a supplement in which the theme is space.

== Reception ==
Star Munchkin won the 2002 Origins Award for Best Traditional Card Game.

== Reviews ==
- Syfy
- Backstab #49
