= The Hills Run Red (2009 film) =

2009 American slasher film by Dave Parker

- Theatrical release poster
- Directed by: Dave Parker
- Screenplay by: David J. Schow
- Story by: John Carchietta
- Based on: the screenplay by John Dombrow
- Produced by: Roee Sharon Peled; Jonathan Tzachor; John Carchietta; Robert Meyer Burnett; Carl Morano
- Starring: Sophie Monk; Tad Hilgenbrink; Janet Montgomery; Alex Wyndham; William Sadler
- Narrated by: Robert Burnett
- Cinematography: Ilan Rosenberg
- Edited by: Harold Parker
- Music by: Frederik Wiedmann
- Production companies: Dark Castle Home Entertainment; Fever Dreams LLC; Ludovico Technique; Warner Premiere
- Distributed by: Warner Bros. Pictures (limited Seattle International Film Festival); Warner Home Video (DVD edition)
- Release dates: June 12, 2009 (Seattle International Film Festival); September 29, 2009 (United States)
- Running time: 81 minutes
- Country: United States
- Language: English
- Budget: $4.5 million

The Hills Run Red is a 2009 American slasher film directed by Dave Parker and written by David J. Schow and starring Sophie Monk, Tad Hilgenbrink and William Sadler. The film was released on June 12, 2009 at Seattle International Film Festival and was released on DVD on September 29, 2009, and received mixed reviews.

The film focuses on a group of friends who attempt to find a lost horror film titled The Hills Run Red, but they find themselves being stalked by the film's serial killer, Babyface, and discover a horrifying secret about the film they seek.

== Plot ==
Film student Tyler is obsessed with the horror film The Hills Run Red, considered the scariest movie ever made, with the deranged serial killer Babyface in the lead role. However, the film's director, Wilson Wyler Concannon, disappeared years ago, and no known film copy exists. Tyler's obsession leads him to neglect his girlfriend, Serina, who begins cheating on him with the couple's close friend, Lalo. When Tyler discovers that Concannon's daughter Alexa works in a nightclub as a stripper, he decides to meet her and ask about the lost film. He visits Alexa and asks her about the project as she gives him a nude lap dance and later brings him home, where he forces her to comply with him. Alexa informs Tyler that the movie might be in her father's home in the woods.

Tyler drives out to Concannon's home, accompanied by Serina, Lalo, and Alexa. After interviewing several people on the way there, Tyler confides to Alexa that he deduced that Serina and Lalo are having an affair, and, after a heart-to-heart on his love for The Hills Run Red, he and Alexa kiss. They are suddenly bound and attacked by rednecks whom they had interviewed earlier, who threaten to rape Alexa and Serina. Babyface appears and kills the assailants before chasing the group into the woods and disappearing. Tyler breaks into the house, finds a red room with many film reels hanging from the ceiling, and later rescues Alexa. The two meet up with Serina, but Babyface attacks the trio, which knocks Tyler unconscious, enables Babyface to catch Alexa, and forces Serina to flee, however Alexa is revealed to be ordering Babyface and had previously paid off the rednecks. During her escape, Serina is shocked to find bloodied bodies inside a makeshift smokehouse, but Babyface eventually captures her.

Tyler wakes and finds himself tied to a wheelchair, with many film reels of The Hills Run Red behind him and Concannon finally appearing. Concannon reveals that Alexa is in league with him and tells him the secret behind the scares in his film. 20 years prior, a dissatisfied Concannon took Babyface's costume from the original actor and violently axed the actor to death. He has since killed all his actors by making all their on-screen deaths real. Due to this, the screenings were cancelled and the actors were proclaimed missing. He also reveals that Babyface is his son, a product of incest between him and Alexa, who gave birth to Babyface when she was twelve. Growing up watching The Hills Run Red, Babyface mutilated his face and stitched the mask to himself like the fictional character to please his father. As Concannon speaks with Tyler, Alexa begins filming her movie as she tortures Lalo in the barn while Babyface rapes Serina.

Concannon brings Tyler to the barn, where he is enraged to see his daughter making her movie without him. He calls Babyface, which gives Serina a chance to escape. Alexa kills Lalo as she argues with her father, which leads to Concannon shooting her. Angered by Alexa's apparent death, Babyface turns on his father and fights him. Tyler takes a camera and successfully convinces Babyface to kill Concannon. Babyface then turns on Tyler, but before he can kill him, Serina stabs Babyface through the back with a long iron staff, killing him. However, Alexa recovers and knocks both Serina and Tyler unconscious, enraged by her son's death. Alexa then ties Tyler up and forces him to watch her cut of The Hills Run Red, thanking him for realizing her potential as a director independent from her father. As the film continuously loops, Tyler frees his mouth gag and begins maniacally laughing as he bleeds out.

In a mid-credits scene, Serina, still Alexa's prisoner, is several months pregnant with Babyface's child. Alexa brings Babyface's mask as a gift for her future grandchild and sings a lullaby to the baby as Serina screams.

== Cast ==
- Sophie Monk as Alexa Concannon
- Tad Hilgenbrink as Tyler
- William Sadler as Wilson Wyler Concannon
- Janet Montgomery as Serina
- Alex Wyndham as Lalo
- Joy McBrinn as Belle
- Danko Jordanov as Babyface (as Danko Iordanov)
- Ewan Bailey as Sonny
- Mike Straub as Gabe
- Hristo Mitzkov as Jimbo
- Georgi Dimitrov as Lance (as Georgi Dimitrov-Bomba)
- Ekaterina Temelkova as Sherri
- Raicho Vasilev as Actor Babyface
- Itai Diakov as Teen Babyface

== Production ==
The Hills Run Red, written by John Carchietta and John Dombrow, first began development under Fever Dream Films. In 2006, director Dave Parker and producer Robert Meyer Burnett signed onto the film after turning down an offer to take on the studio's Wicked Lake. Unsatisfied with the screenplay from Carchietta and Dombrow, the team brought in David J. Schow to rework the script. Burnett claimed the duo's script was too "reflective" and "just seemed too much like Scream". Parker, who had been on hiatus since directing The Dead Hate the Living!, and Burnett flew out to Hollywood, California and shot a teaser trailer for the film which drew the attention of Bryan Singer and Gil Adler. Singer would reach out to Diane Nelson, head of Warner Premiere at the time, who would agree to produce the film along with Dark Castle Home Entertainment; giving the greenlight in April 2008. Burnett and Parker initially intended to make the film for $350,000 with Fever Dream Films prior to involvement of Nelson.

In June 2008, the film was officially announced with Sophie Monk, Tad Hilgenbrink, Janet Montgomery, and William Sadler as part of the cast. Monk passed on a role in The Hangover in order to star in the film. Sadler, who already had a working relationship with the film's executive producer Joel Silver, was Parker's first choice for the role of Wilson.

Filming began in Sofia, Bulgaria in June 2008 and wrapped the following month. In an interview in 2019, Monk herself admitted to not learning her lines.

== Release ==
The Hills Run Red was first screened at the Seattle International Film Festival on June 12, 2009.

=== Home media ===
The film was released on DVD on September 29, 2009, by Warner Home Video. In April 2020, Shout Factory announced they would release the film on Blu-ray for the first time, setting a release date for June 16, 2020.

== Reception ==
On review aggregator website Rotten Tomatoes, The Hills Run Red received an approval rating of 50% based on 7 reviews, and an average rating of 5.4/10.

J. R. McNamara from Digital Retribution.com praised the film calling it "the best 80s styled slasher [film]" "[With] perfect sized doses (all lethal) of beatings, brutalizations, babes and breasts all make for a great film". Daryl Loomis from DVD Verdict gave the film a positive review stating "The Hills Run Red is an above average little horror movie that is a love affair with horror for its director. He got to make his movie, but also got to travel back in time to make a film from what he feels is the golden age for the genre. It's a good idea that is pulled off reasonably well. For horror fans, this is definitely worth a rental".

Gareth Jones from Dread Central awarded the film a score of 4/5 stating "If you’re a fan of slasher flicks, or even just truly inventive and twisted horror, you owe it to yourself to pick it up". Felix Vasquez from Cinema Crazedcalled it "[a] maniacal, gory, and smart slasher", commending the film's anarchic tone, quick pacing, themes, and villain.

Tyler Foster from DVD Talk awarded the film 3/5 stars, stating that the film was above average in terms of the horror films released during that time, while also stating that the film was "not that great in the bigger picture". Will Brownridge from The Film Reel commended the film's villain as being "creepy", characters, and gore. However, Brownridge criticized the film's storyline, and plot twist, which he felt was "stupid". Ian Jane from Rock! Shock! Pop! stated that the film was "not particularly original, and at times, it’s border line dumb".
