= Mickey Cassidy =

American stunt actor and stunt coordinator

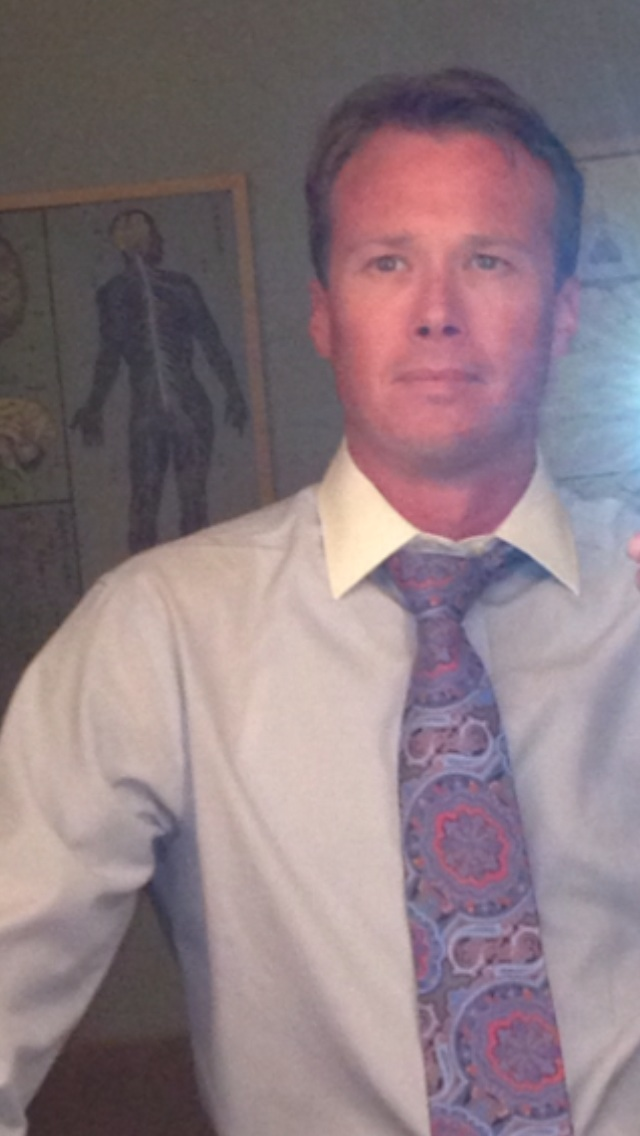
- Cassidy in 2013
- Occupation: Film actor

Mickey Cassidy is an American stunt actor and stunt coordinator. Mickey was one of the first original stuntkids in the industry doubling kid actors, such as, Macaulay Culkin and Elijah Wood at the young age of 8. He broke a Guinness world record at the age of 13 while doubling Culkin in the Good Son for a 180-foot-high fall off a cliff. More than 20 years later, Mickey won his first Emmy for Outstanding Stunt Coordination for The Bold and the Beautiful in 2015.

== Filmography ==
He has appeared in many movies including:

- 2005 Jarhead (stunts)
- 2005 All That 10th Anniversary Reunion Special (stunt performer) (stunts)
- 2005 Mystery Woman: Snapshot (stunts)
- 1996 Spy Hard (stunts)
- 1995 Casper (stunts)
- 1995 3 Ninjas Knuckle Up (stunts)
- 1995 The Tin Soldier (stunts)
- 1994 Ri¢hie Ri¢h (stunts)
- 1994 The Pagemaster (stunts)
- 1994 Getting Even with Dad (stunts)
- 1994 D2: The Mighty Ducks (stunts)
- 1994 Monkey Trouble (stunts)
- 1993 The Good Son (stunt double)
- 1992 Picket Fences (stunts)
- 1992 The Fear Inside (stunts)
- 1991 Hook (stunts)
- 1991 Problem Child 2 (stunts)
- 1989 Honey, I Shrunk the Kids (stunts)
- 1984 The Ewok Adventure (stunts)
