= Jay Knowles =

American country songwriter

- Born: Texas, U.S.
- Origin: Nashville, Tennessee, U.S.
- Occupation: Songwriter
- Years active: 1990s–present

Jay Knowles is an American songwriter whose work has been recorded by George Strait, Alan Jackson, Jack Ingram, David Nail, Lee Ann Womack, and Lainey Wilson. He co-wrote Strait's "She'll Leave You with a Smile", which reached No. 1 on Billboard Hot Country Singles & Tracks in 2002, and Jackson's "So You Don't Have to Love Me Anymore", which was nominated for Best Country Song at the 55th Grammy Awards. His credits also include Jack Ingram's "Love You", David Nail's Top 20 hit "Kiss You Tonight", and Lainey Wilson's "Sayin' What I'm Thinkin'". His work has been profiled in major outlets including The New Yorker, which cited him as a voice in Nashville's contemporary songwriting community.

== Career ==
Knowles' first chart entry as a songwriter was "Self Made Man" (2000) for Montgomery Gentry, co-written with Wynn Varble. In 2002, he co-wrote Strait's No. 1 hit "She'll Leave You with a Smile" with Odie Blackmon, helping Strait set a record for most No. 1 country singles by a solo artist. The single earned Knowles a BMI Country Award and a BMI Million-Air Award.

In 2006, Jack Ingram released Knowles' co-write "Love You", written with Trent Summar, which entered the Billboard country charts. In 2014, David Nail's single "Kiss You Tonight", co-written by Knowles with David Cook and Summar, reached No. 17 on Billboard Country Airplay and was selected as a "Critic's Pick" by Taste of Country.

With Adam Wright, Knowles co-wrote "So You Don't Have to Love Me Anymore" (2012), which earned a nomination for Best Country Song at the 55th Grammy Awards. The pair also contributed "Taillights Blue" to Jackson's 2010 album Freight Train, highlighted in coverage by The Boot.

Knowles' songs continued to appear on major label projects into the 2010s and 2020s. He co-wrote "The Lonely, the Lonesome & the Gone" with Wright, the title track of Lee Ann Womack's 2017 album, and the title cut of Lainey Wilson's 2021 debut Sayin' What I'm Thinkin'. Outside country, he co-wrote "(I Do) Like We Do" with Jim McCormick for Harry Connick Jr.'s 2015 album That Would Be Me.

In addition to commercial recordings, Knowles has been active in the Nashville songwriting community. He has appeared in songwriter rounds at the Bluebird Café and led critique sessions for the NSAI.

== Awards and recognition ==
- Grammy Award nomination, Best Country Song (55th Grammys) for "So You Don't Have to Love Me Anymore" (with Adam Wright).
- BMI Country Award for "She'll Leave You with a Smile" (2003).
- BMI Million-Air Award for "She'll Leave You with a Smile" (2004).

== Frequent collaborators ==
Knowles has co-written extensively with Adam Wright, Wynn Varble, Jim McCormick, Trent Summar, and Odie Blackmon.

== Selected songwriting credits ==
- "She'll Leave You with a Smile" — George Strait (with Odie Blackmon).
- "Self Made Man" — Montgomery Gentry (with Wynn Varble).
- "Love You" — Jack Ingram (with Trent Summar).
- "Kiss You Tonight" — David Nail (with David Cook, Trent Summar).
- "So You Don't Have to Love Me Anymore" — Alan Jackson (with Adam Wright).
- "Taillights Blue" — Alan Jackson (with Adam Wright), on Freight Train (2010).
- "The Lonely, the Lonesome & the Gone" — Lee Ann Womack (with Adam Wright), title track (2017).
- "(I Do) Like We Do" — Harry Connick Jr. (with Jim McCormick), on That Would Be Me (2015).
- "Sayin' What I'm Thinkin'" — Lainey Wilson, title track (2021).

== Solo recordings ==
- Jay Knowles Breaks His Own Record (independent). Includes the duet version of "(I Do) Like We Do".
