= Mag Blast =

Mag Blast is a spaceship-themed strategy card game, produced by gaming company Fantasy Flight Games. The first edition was set in the universe of "Twilight Imperium", a board game made by the same company. The game is playable for 2-8 players, and is described as "a game of screaming space battles". The first edition was printed in 1998. A second edition was produced as well continuing the use of Twilight Imperium artwork. A Third Edition printed in 2006 moved away from the use of Twilight Imperium as the theme and instead uses artwork from comic artist John Kovalic. This change in artwork was highly criticised by old fans of the game.

== Gameplay ==
The goal of the game is to destroy opponents' flagships after destroying their protective layer of attack ships. Once the flagship is destroyed the player is eliminated from the game. The last player left with their flagship intact is declared the winner.

Each player receives a flagship card which is placed at the center of that player's battle formation. The flagship is surrounded on four sides by various other kinds of ships which are able to mount attacks on other players' fleets. This is done by firing 3 different kinds of lasers at opposing ships in the corresponding sector; for example, if Player A has a ship in the left-quadrant of his battle formation, he may fire upon any enemy ship which is also in the left-quadrant of their battle formation. Laser shots are made using Attack Cards. Each player draws up to five attack cards per turn.

Game rules also require that players must make an appropriate sound effect when playing an attack card (referred to in-game as "Make a Silly Noise or Miss" Blast Targeting System technology).

== Reviews ==
- Backstab #19
- Rebel Times #2
