= The Lord of the Rings: The Two Towers (board game) =

Board game

The Lord of the Rings: The Two Towers is a 2002 board game published by Games Workshop.

== Reception ==
The reviewer from the online second volume of Pyramid stated that "In a nice touch, Games Workshop has designed the small cardboard flap that separates the contents as a ruler, meaning that the game can, with some assembling of the miniatures, be played straight out of the box. As with their earlier Fellowship of the Ring set, The Two Towers is an attractive, well designed game."

The Lord of the Rings: The Two Towers won the 2002 Origins Award for Best Science Fiction Or Fantasy Miniature Rules.
