= Apples to Apples =

Party game

"The Game of Hilarious Comparisons!"
- The cover of the Apples to Apples Party Box
- Designers: Mark Alan Osterhaus, Matthew Kirby
- Publishers: Pegasus Spiele, Out of the Box, Mattel
- Publication: 1999; 27 years ago
- Years active: 1999–present
- Players: 4–10
- Setup time: 1 minute
- Playing time: 30–75 minutes
- Chance: Medium
- Age range: 12 and up
- Skills: Social skills

Related games
- Dixit, Say Anything, Cranium

Apples to Apples is a card-based party game originally published by Out of the Box Publishing Inc., and now by Mattel. Players start with a hand of seven "red apple" cards, which feature nouns. A player is selected to be the first judge, and that judge plays a "green apple" card, which features an adjective. The round is won by playing the "red apple" card that the judge determines to be the best match for the "green apple" card. The role of the judge rotates, and the number of rounds is determined by the number of players. The game is designed for four to ten players and played for 30–75 minutes.

Apples to Apples was chosen by Mensa International in 1999 as a "Mensa Select" prizewinner, an award given to five games each year. It was also named "Party Game of the Year" in the December 1999 issue of Games magazine and received the National Parenting Center's seal of approval in May 1999. The popularity of the game led to an increased interest in similar card-matching/answer-judging party games. On September 8, 2007, Out of the Box Publishing sold the rights for Apples to Apples to Mattel.

== Game versions ==
Seven red cards

The original boxed set contained:

- 108 green cards (green apples), each of which has an adjective printed on one side.
- 324 red cards (red apples), each of which has a noun printed on one side.
- A tray for holding the cards.

Four expansion sets were available, adding 72 extra green apple cards and 216 additional red apple cards each. In 2002, Expansion Set 3 won the Origins Award for Best Card Game Expansion or Supplement of 2001. As of 2005, the original set and its expansions have been retired and replaced by a Party Box with the combined contents of the basic set and its first two expansions, and Party Box Expansion 1 set with the combined contents of the third and fourth expansions, and a Party Box Expansion 2, which contains new cards. Apples to Apples Junior, for ages nine and up, Apples to Apples Kids, for ages seven and up, and a variety of themed editions were also developed. Mattel has continued to update card sets and packaging and add themed editions.

Apples to Apples enthusiasts have also made many variants to the game. These include:

Instead of trying to find the "best" match, players try to pick the card that is the exact opposite (or a sarcastic one), and the winner is the worst.

Switching the cards. Instead of having a green question card and a hand of reds, players have a red question card and a hand of greens.

Mixing in a random red card into the choice of red cards. If it wins, it goes to nobody.

== Reception ==
In 2019, Apples to Apples was inducted into the Origins Award Hall of Fame.

== Reviews ==
- Family Games: The 100 Best
- That's a Good Game: Games Like Apples to Apples

== See also ==
- Cards Against Humanity – a similar game, but oriented for an adult audience
- Dixit
