= Munchkin (card game) =

Card game spoofing table-top RPG play

- Old box cover
- Publication: First Edition: September 2001; 25 years ago Second Edition: October 1, 2026; 40 days ago
- Players: 3–6
- Setup time: 1–2 minutes
- Playing time: 1–2 hours
- Chance: High
- Age range: 12 and above
- Skills: Strategy

Munchkin is a dedicated deck card game by Steve Jackson Games, written by Steve Jackson and illustrated by John Kovalic. It is a humorous take on role-playing games, based on the concept of munchkins (immature role-players, playing only to "win" by having the most powerful character possible).

Munchkin won the 2001 Origins Award for Best Traditional Card Game, and is itself a spin-off of The Munchkin's Guide to Powergaming, a gaming humor book which also won an Origins Award in 2000.

After the success of the original Munchkin game several expansion packs and sequels were published. Now available in 15 different languages, Munchkin accounted for more than 70% of the 2007 sales for Steve Jackson Games and remains their top-selling title through 2020. A second edition was released in October 2026.

== Gameplay ==
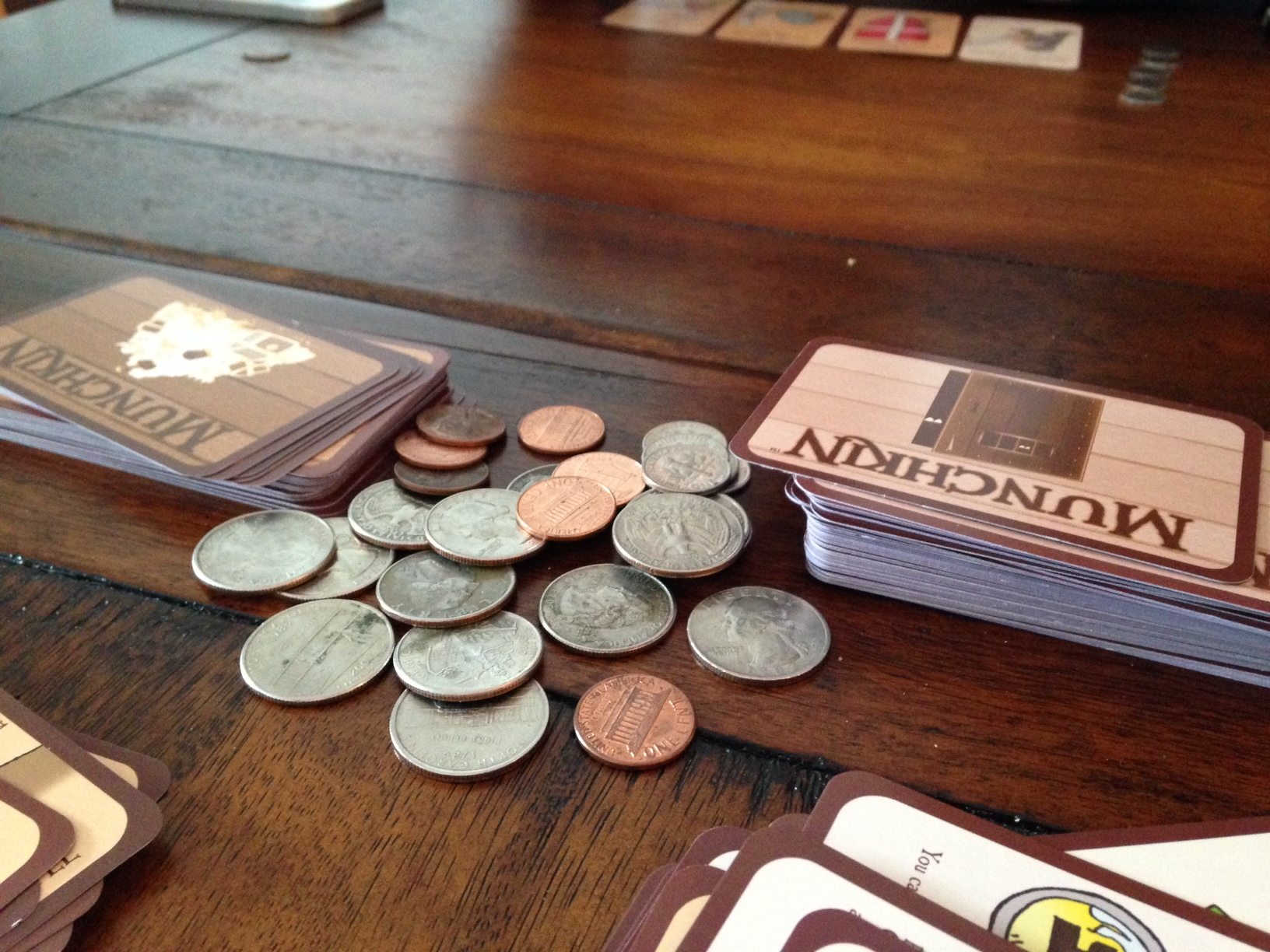
A game of Munchkin being played, with coins being used to denote levels.

In Munchkin, all players start at level 1, with the goal of reaching level 10 (or level 20 in Epic Level games). Players primarily progress by killing monsters, and level up every time they kill a monster. However, players can freely use cards against monsters and other players during play, allowing them to either assist or to sabotage others during their turn. Each person's turn begins when they "kick down the door" by drawing a Door Card face-up. A Door Card can be one of the following types: a Monster Card, which the player must engage by fighting or fleeing; a Curse Card, which applies an effect; or an Item Card, Race Card, or Class Card, which the player adds to their hand. If the card drawn is not a Monster Card, the player can either "loot the room" by drawing a face-down door card and adding it to their hand, or "look for trouble" by playing a Monster Card from their hand to fight it.

When fighting a monster, the total level of the player, combined with the power from the items they possess (and any supporting players' total level and item power), is weighed against the total level of the monster(s) to determine the victor. A successful player draws the listed amount of treasure cards and levels up according to however many levels the monster is worth. An unsuccessful character must roll the dice to try and flee; players who fail to roll a five or six suffer the monster's negative effects ("Bad Stuff"), which can include losing levels, losing a piece of equipment, losing cards from hand, or even dying.

If a player dies, their turn immediately ends, and other players will get their chance to Loot the Body. Starting with the player with the highest level, everyone else chooses one card and in case of ties in Level, rolls a die. Once everyone gets one card, the rest is discarded. When the next player's turn begins, the new character appears and can help others in combat with its Level and Class or Race abilities. The next turn starts with four face-down cards being drawn from each deck and any desired legal cards being played, like at game start. The turn then proceeds normally.

Due to the highly competitive nature of the game and the presence of rule-breaking cards, players are encouraged to use unfair tactics against others, to act as a mercenary to further themselves at the expense of others, or to use cheat cards to affect outcomes (such as fixing the roll of the die). Throughout a player's turn, others are free to intervene: they can passively buff or debuff the player or monsters to alter the outcome; play monster cards of matching types to make the battle more difficult; or offer to assist the player, typically in exchange for treasure cards.

Other cards that can enter play include Items, which can be used in combat, Treasure Cards, which act as sellable loot and equipment, and Curse Cards, which apply effects. Additionally, players can equip certain cards (such as armor and weapons) to raise their combat power and kill stronger monsters, and can use Class Cards and Race Cards to grant extra abilities or advantages at the cost of a balanced weakness; for example, the elf race can level when helping others kill monsters, but will take additional damage from disgusting enemies.

Standard games typically last around an hour, with the game ending once a player reaches the target level and wins the match. Aside from defeating monsters, players can progress through indirect means such as selling cards (with every 1000 Gold on the sum total granting a level) or by playing special leveling cards. Most games disallow victory through indirect methods, meaning only fighting a monster can win the game. There are a few exceptions, however, such as when a player uses cards that specifically state they override rules.

== Reception ==
As of 2026, on BoardGameGeek the average user rating is 5.9/10. Munchkin Second Edition was successfully crowdfunded on BackerKit in February 2026.

=== Awards and honors ===
A 2002 expansion, Star Munchkin, won the 2002 Origins Award for Best Traditional Card Game.

=== Reviews ===
A 2002 review on RPGnet regards Munchkin as not a very serious game.

In a review of Munchkin in Black Gate, Bob Byrne said "I can't imagine anyone playing Munchkin with two friends and not enjoying it. [...] The shifting alliances, the humor on the cards, the ebb and flow of winning and losing: it is simply a fun, fun game. We often don't finish in an hour and declare the leader the winner (though it is possible to get to level ten in an hour). But unlike many games, the experience of just playing is the real reward." Mark Rigney for Black Gate said "Here there be dragons, yes, but also a lot of snide references aimed at society in general. For my money (thank goodness, our box of Munchkin was a gift, so it cost me nothing), it's all in good fun."

Tom Vasel of The Dice Tower was critical of the game Munchkin feeling it was overpriced, had limited re-playability, and a poor and occasionally tedious gaming experience.

Other reviews:

- Rebel Times #15 (that magazine also reviewed numerous expansions of the main game)

== Variations ==
There are numerous themed variations and expansion sets for Munchkin in addition to the main series of expansions, including:

- Epic Munchkin (changes the rules so game ends at Level 20)
- The Good, the Bad, and the Munchkin (spaghetti Westerns)
- Munchkin Adventure Time (based on the Adventure Time series)
- Munchkin Apocalypse
- Munchkin Axe Cop (based on the web comic series)
- Munchkin Bites! (vampires, werewolves, etc.)
- Munchkin Blender (helps with mash-up games that mix many different expansion sets together)
- Munchkin Booty! (pirates)
- Munchkin Cthulhu (Lovecraftian)
- Munchkin Fu (martial arts)
- Munchkin Impossible (spies)
- Munchkin Harry Potter (based on the book series)
- Munchkin Legends (mythology and legends)
- Munchkin Marvel (based on the various Marvel comics)
- Munchkin Rick and Morty (based on the animated television series)
- Munchkin Shakespeare (based on the works of the bard)
- Munchkin Steampunk
- Munchkin Warhammer: Age of Sigmar (based on the tabletop wargame)
- Munchkin Warhammer 40,000 (based on the tabletop wargame)
- Star Munchkin (space opera and military science fiction)
- Super Munchkin (superheroes)
- Munchkin Zombies

There are also a number of boardgames, each with various expansions:

- Munchkin Dungeon (dungeon crawl)
- Munchkin Panic
- Munchkin Quest (tile-based dungeon crawl)
- Smash Up: Munchkin (Munchkin version of the boardgame Smash Up)
- Munchkin Treasure Hunt (for younger players)

== Digital adaptation ==
A video game adaptation, Munchkin Digital, was developed by Dire Wolf Digital in partnership with Steve Jackson Games and announced in 2022. It entered early access on Steam on December 1, 2022, and was fully released on March 9, 2023. The full release enabled cross-platform online multiplayer between Steam and the game's iOS and Android versions.
