= Dork Tower =

Comic by John Kovalic

- Cover of Dork Tower #5
- Author: John Kovalic
- Website: www.dorktower.com
- Launch date: January 1997
- Genre: Fantasy

Dork Tower is an online comic created, written and drawn by John Kovalic. It chronicles the lives of a group of geeks living in the fictional town of Mud Bay, Wisconsin. Mud Bay's design is strongly influenced by the author's home town of Madison, Wisconsin. Topics have included role-playing games (RPGs), comic books, video games, and fandom in general. The comic strip began in January 1997 and has made appearances in publications like Dragon magazine, Shadis, and Comic Shop News. Starting in 2000, the strip began web publication roughly three times a week and is featured in Pyramid. The bimonthly comic book made its first appearance in 1998 and features continuing storylines. It went to full color with issue #32, and it is collected in trade paperback.

During its first year in Dragon, Dork Tower was called Shop Keep, making the comics focusing on Bill Blyden and Pegasaurus Games a separate series from the comics focusing on Matt and his group that were published elsewhere (although the Dork Tower cast, especially Igor, also appeared in Shop Keep as customers). This was later discontinued, and subsequent Pegasaurus-based strips were also titled Dork Tower. The name is a cacographic of the Judges Guild Advanced Dungeons & Dragons module Dark Tower.

== Awards ==
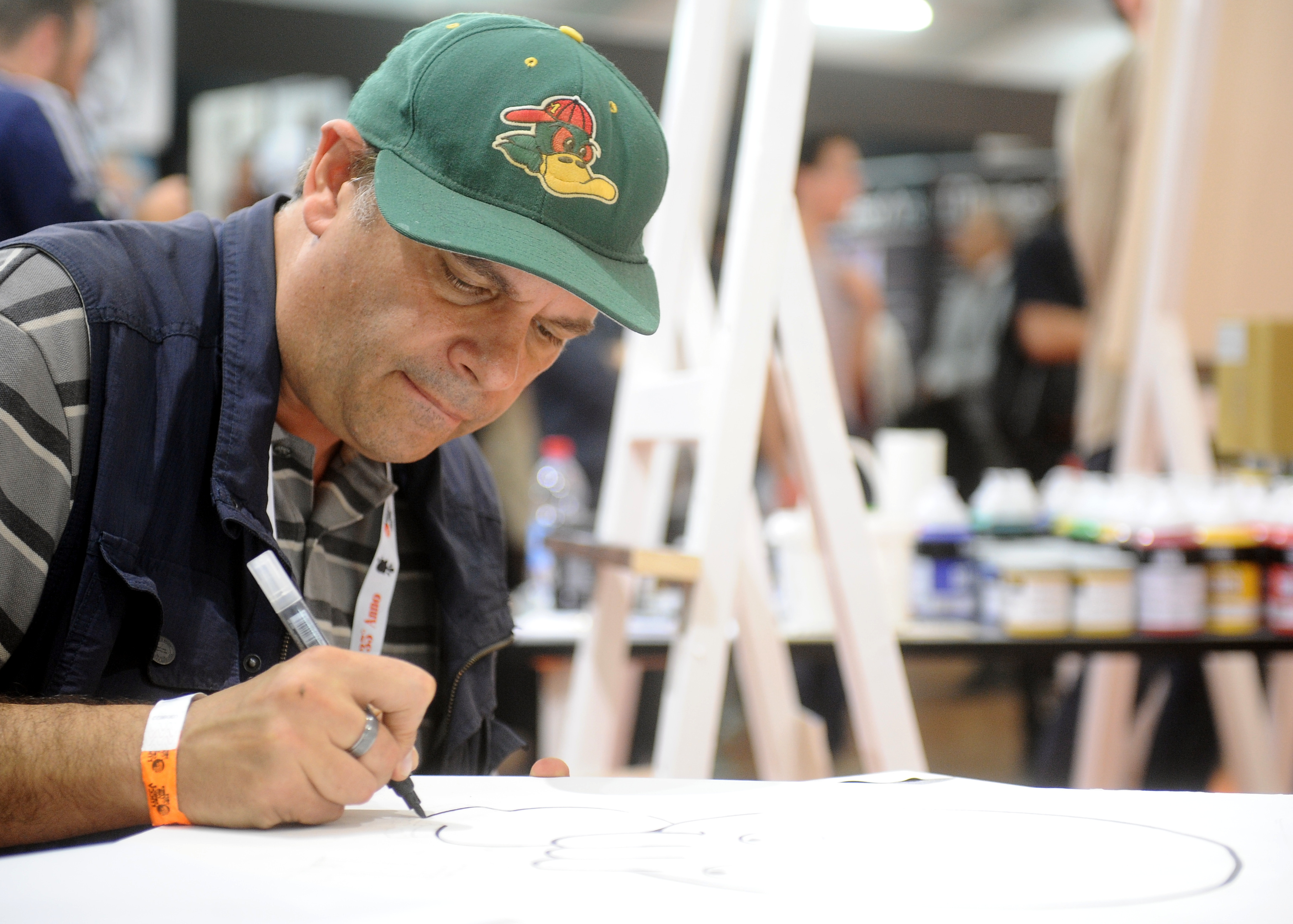
Creator John Kovalic at Lucca Comics & Games in 2014.

Dork Tower won the 2002 Origins Awards for Best Game-Related Periodical and Best Game-Related Fiction, Graphic Form (Dork Tower #18), and the 2001 award for Best Professional Game Periodical.

John Kovalic also won the 2001 Origins Award for Best Illustration for the cover of Dork Shadows. The story "Matt and Gilly's Big Date" won the 2000 Origins Award for Best Game-Related Short Work, and the story "Everybody Loves Gilly" won the 2003 award for Graphic Fiction.

== Cast of characters ==
Dork Tower's central characters are a group of people who play games as a hobby, including role-playing games and miniatures games, and some also participate in live action role-playing games. The comic primarily chronicles the ins-and-outs of the gaming world (typically exaggerating stereotypes of gamers for comic effect).

- Matt McLimore is the main character in the comic book; many of the storylines focus around his love life. He usually serves as the gamemaster for his group of friends when they role-play; his favorite game is Warhamster (a parody of Warhammer Fantasy Roleplay). He has been dating Kayleigh but has a crush on Gilly. He works as a graphic designer but also draws his own comic book, That Grrl, in his spare time. The main character in That Grrl bears a strong resemblance to Gilly.
- Ken Mills is the most responsible of the group. He likes miniature figures and usually plays as a Cleric in the group's RPG campaigns. He is dating Sujata, Kayleigh's roommate. Sujata enjoys miniature wargaming.
- Igor Olman is largely the comic relief. He has been Matt's best friend since they were kids. In games, Igor tends to make rash decisions that get the party killed. He also likes to LARP, usually playing Vampire: The Groveling (a parody of Vampire: The Masquerade) with the goths. He cannot stand Kayleigh, and wants to get Matt together with Gilly. He is an obsessive collector and a spendthrift; his cry of "It must be mine!" (accompanied by flung wads of cash) has become the series' most popular catchphrase. He also is an alien in Cosmic Encounter Online as "Dork". He claims to be the nephew of Good Eats host Alton Brown.
- Carson is a muskrat. He is flighty and switches interests regularly. He also makes rash decisions when he role-plays. Carson works demeaning jobs in the service sector to pay for his hobbies, which include comic book collecting. Carson is a fan of the Chicago Cubs. He is also the star of John Kovalic's comic strip Wild Life.
- Bill Blyden is the owner and manager of Pegasaurus Games, a store in Mud Bay where all the characters shop. The Shop Keep comic strips published in Dragon magazine, before the strip reverted to Dork Tower, focus on his activities. He is married to Stacy, and his sole employee is Leslie. Pegasaurus is strongly influenced by Madison, Wisconsin game shop Pegasus Games, as are the character designs of Bill and Leslie.
- Gilly Woods (the Perky Goth) likes to LARP, which is how Igor met her. Matt saw her at a party and developed a crush on her, but did not meet her until Igor invited Gilly to one of their games. Gilly likes cute and cheerful things, to the disgust of her brother Walden. She recently moved to London for grad school.
- Walden Woods is Gilly's older brother, a mopey goth. He is the leader of the goth gamers in Mud Bay, and often has to deal with the indignity of the LARPers being kicked out of everywhere they want to play (recently ending up at the pet cemetery).
- Kayleigh was Matt's girlfriend. They have known each other since they were kids, and went steady in college. They got back together recently, much to the disgust of Matt's friends, then broke up again. She looks down on almost all of Matt's hobbies and interests (except for Buffy the Vampire Slayer), even though she is an excellent gamer. Kayleigh is a journalist for a local newspaper.
- Maxwell and Claire were also featured in Dragon magazine. Little is known about them save that they are married and enthusiastic role-players, although their differences within the hobby often lead to arguments. Maxwell also has a crush on Gilly, which causes a lot of friction.

== Collections ==
Title	Issues	ISBN	Comments
Dork Covenant	1–6	1-930964-40-4	
Dork Shadows	7–12	1-930964-41-2	
Heart of Dorkness	13–17	1-930964-43-9	
Livin' La Vida Dorka	—	1-930964-42-0	Strips collected from Interactive Week, Gamespy.com, Pyramid Online, and Scrye magazine
Understanding Gamers	18	1-930964-44-7	Includes LOTR Special; strips from DorkTower.com, Dragon, Scrye, and Games magazines
1d6 Degrees of Separation	19–24	1-930964-74-9	
Dork Side of the Goon	25–29	1-930964-85-4	
Go, Dork, Go!	—	1-930964-70-6	Dork Tower Clicky Special; strips collected from DorkTower.com, Dragon, Comics Buyer's Guide, and Scrye
Dork Decade	—	1-933288-52-3	Collection of the best of Dork Tower from the last ten years
The Tao of Igor	30–35?		Not yet released
