= XXXenophile =

American erotic anthology comic book series

- Cover to XXXenophile #2, pencils by Phil Foglio

Publication information
- Genre: Erotic
- Publication date: 1989-1995
- No. of issues: 10

Creative team
- Created by: Phil Foglio
- Written by: Phil Foglio

XXXenophile is an American comic book series, published by Palliard Press and later Studio Foglio. It is an anthology of short, whimsical, erotic fantasy and science fiction stories, written and penciled by Phil Foglio. Each story is inked by a different artist.

The series' general emphasis is on the enjoyment of sexuality as a playful activity. Foglio satirizes numerous plot elements of fantasy and science fiction, such as time travel, cloning, robots, deals with the devil, love potions, and geasa.

It portrays a variety of sexual activities, including "oral sex, anal sex, group sex, masturbation, voyeurism, double penetration, inter-racial (literally), bestiality (although generally with an animal possessing intelligence), mild sado-masochism, homosexuality (female, in every issue; male, just in the last issue), exhibitionism, sex with any number of devices, necrophilia (specifically sex with a ghost), prostitution, and various others, including some that were only possible in micro-gravity".

Foglio cited rape, mind control, pedophilia, "classical necrophilia", excretion, snuff porn, branding, piercing, heavy sadomasochism, and spanking as topics that he did not find appealing and would not write about.

He recalls: "I had a pediatrician tell me if she had a choice between a young teenage boy finding XXXenophile and Batman, she’d throw him XXXenophile because it teaches much healthier interactions. Of course, this particular pediatrician would not go on the record, and I would not ask her to, but it still gave me good feelings for the day".

== Publication history ==
XXXenophile was published as a series of ten comic books from 1989 to 1995. In 1994, the contents of the first five issues were reprinted in The XXXenophile Big Book O' Fun. In 1997 and 1998, the contents of the ten issues were reprinted in the five-volume The XXXenophile Collection series; each volume contained a number of stories from the original comics (not in their original publication order) plus a new story (generally a second look at characters from an earlier story such as the superhero Orgasm Lass and her four-armed male sidekick Foreplay). The additional stories were compiled separately in a final, eleventh issue of the comic book in 1998. A sixth volume of

The XXXenophile Collection, with a new 64-page story, was published in 2000. In 2004 Studio Foglio released XXXenophile Quick and Dirty, a 20-page booklet of unreleased material. The series is on hiatus on the initiative of the Foglios until their children are of appropriate age for the material.

Palliard Press published a related series, XXXenophile Presents, which presented stories by other creators, each story taking up an entire issue. There were five issues published, with stories by Julie Ann Sczesny, Colin Upton (two), and Charlie Wise (two).

== Card game ==
A XXXenophile collectible card game based on the comic was also created.

In 2001 this game was reworked into a non-adult, non-collectible card game called Girl Genius: The Works, based on the Foglios' comic Girl Genius.

== Contributors ==
XXXenophile stories were inked by a variety of well-known and lesser-known artists:

- David Lee Anderson
- Donna Barr
- Hilary Barta
- Stephen R. Bissette
- Lee Burks
- David Cherry
- Mike Christian
- Dennis Clark
- Randy Crawford
- Geof Darrow
- Stephen DeStefano
- Colleen Doran
- Lela Dowling
- Kevin Eastman
- Bob Eggleton
- Pam Eklund
- Frank Kelly Freas
- Michael T. Gilbert
- Paul Guinan
- Shepherd Hendrix
- Lea Hernandez
- Matt Howarth
- Shon Howell
- Rantz Hoseley
- Quinton Hoover
- Peter Hsu
- Adam Hughes
- Kelley Jones
- Barb Kaalberg
- William Messner-Loebs
- Delphyne Mori
- Mark Nelson
- Gordon Purcell
- Doug Rice
- Julie Ann Sczesny
- Terrie Smith
- Brian Snøddy (two stories)
- Steve Sullivan
- Brian Thomas
- Ruth Thompson
- Susan Van Camp
- Tom Verré
- Neil Vokes
- Bill Willingham
- John Workman
- Vicky Wyman
