= GURPS In Nomine =

2000 supplement for the GURPS role-playing game

- Designers: Elizabeth McCoy; Walter Milliken
- Publishers: Steve Jackson Games
- Publication: 2000; 26 years ago
- Genres: Fantasy
- Systems: GURPS third edition

GURPS In Nomine is a fantasy sourcebook for the GURPS (Generic Universal Role-Playing System), written by Elizabeth McCoy and Walter Milliken, and published by Steve Jackson Games in 2000. It is the adaptation of the In Nomine role-playing game to GURPS third edition.

== Contents ==
GURPS In Nomine involves powerful angels and demons as player characters.

It contains conversion material for the core rules as well as selected supplemental rules. It includes information about the Grigori and their resonance, as well as the Fallen Grigori (also known as Skulkers), which has not yet appeared in the original line. The conversion guidelines in the back can convert both to and from GURPS and the original system.

The character point values for Celestial characters in GURPS In Nomine are very high in relation to most other GURPS settings. Starting characters can easily exceed 800 points, and more experienced characters are likely to exceed 1500 points.

== Publication history ==
The book was written by Elizabeth McCoy and Walter Milliken.

Steve Jackson Games supported its In Nomine role-playing game for four years before releasing GURPS In Nomine in 2000, at which point the company no longer supported other role-playing games besides GURPS.

== Reviews ==
- Backstab #24

== See also ==
- List of GURPS publications
