= Palliard Press =

Defunct American comic book publisher

- Status: Defunct
- Founder: Phil Foglio and Greg Ketter
- Country of origin: United States
- Headquarters location: Minneapolis, Minnesota
- Publication types: Books

Palliard Press was a small, independent comic book publishing house co-founded by Phil Foglio, illustrator of such titles as Buck Godot, Girl Genius, and Robert Asprin's MythAdventures, and Greg Ketter, owner of DreamHaven Books in Minneapolis, Minnesota.

Palliard Press published several titles over its short existence, most notably the humorous science fiction miniseries Buck Godot: Zap Gun For Hire: The Gallimaufry, the erotic series XXXenophile, and What's New with Phil & Dixie, all illustrated by Foglio. Palliard also published a collection of Tim Barela's gay comic strip, Leonard and Larry.
