= Phil Foglio =

American cartoonist (born 1956)

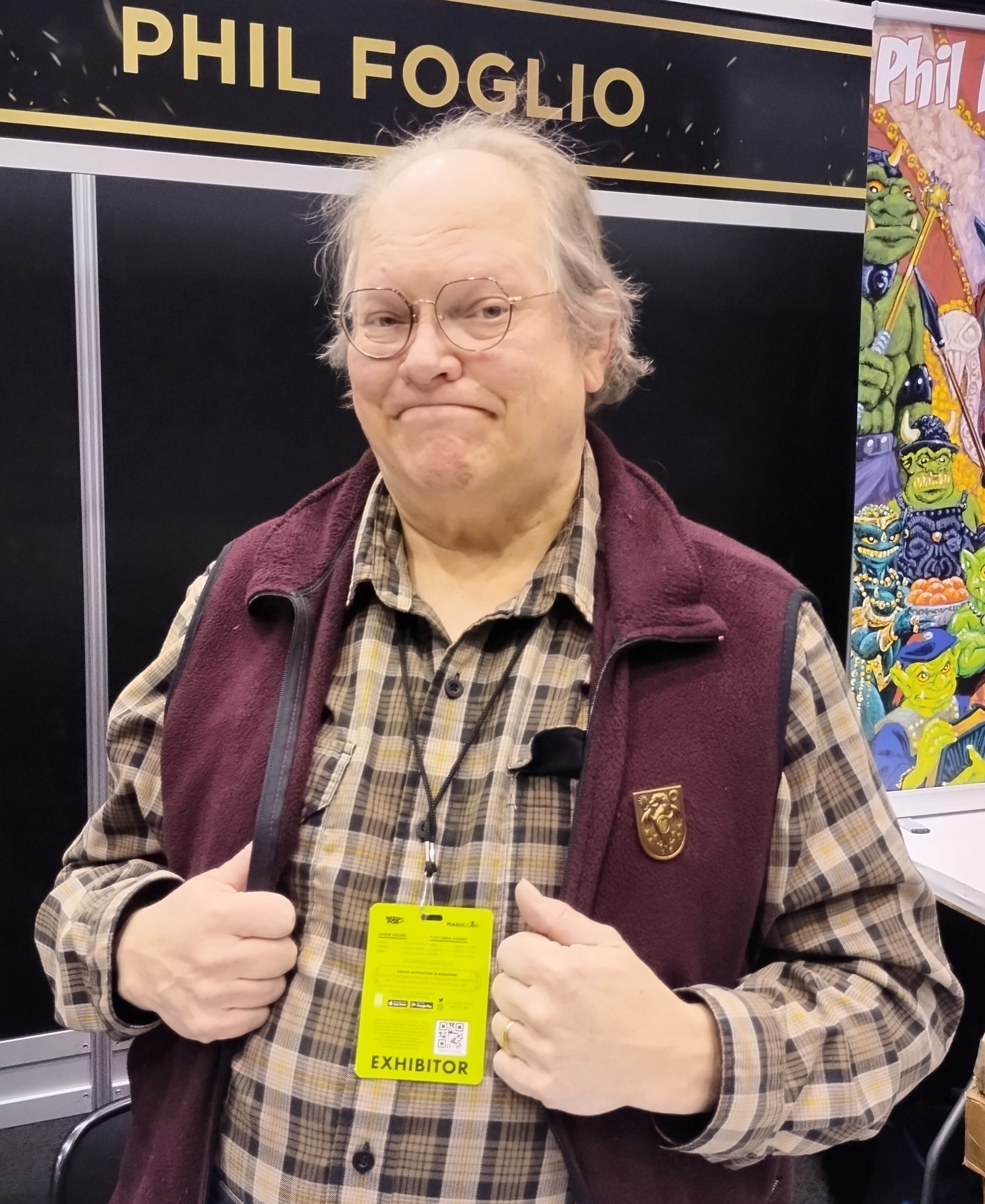
- Foglio at Chicago MagicCon in 2025
- Born: May 1, 1956 (age 70); Mount Vernon, New York, U.S.
- Education: DePaul University
- Occupations: Cartoonist, artist
- Spouse: Kaja Foglio

Philip Peter Foglio (born May 1, 1956) is an American cartoonist and comic book artist known for his humorous science fiction and fantasy art.

== Early life and career ==
Foglio was born on May 1, 1956, in Mount Vernon, New York, and moved with his family to Hartsdale, New York, where he lived until he was 17.

He attended the Chicago Academy of Fine Arts in Chicago, Illinois, and was a member of the university's science fiction club, art-directing and co-editing the group's fanzine, Effen Essef. He was nominated for both the Hugo Award for Best Fan Artist and the Hugo Award for Best Dramatic Presentation in 1976, and won Best Fan Artist in 1977 and 1978.

After living in the DePaul dorms for a few years, Phil moved to the Rogers Park neighborhood of Chicago and hosted weekly Thursday night meetings of Chicago-area science fiction fans. He drew the first known Unix daemons for a limited series of T-shirts in 1979.

Beginning in 1980, Foglio wrote and illustrated the comic strip What's New with Phil & Dixie for Dragon Magazine from TSR Hobbies, satirizing the world of role-playing games. The strip ran monthly for three years. In the early 1980s, after some time in Chicago attempting to find work doing science fiction magazine and book illustration, Foglio moved to New York City.

He formed the independent comic-book company "ffantasy ffactory" [no capitals] with science-fiction writer-artist Connor Freff Cochran (Freff) and science-fiction book editor Melissa Ann Singer. Working with editorial input from Chris Claremont, Foglio and Freff wrote and drew a single issue of a science-fiction/historical title called D'Arc Tangent before ending their collaboration in 1984.

He eventually returned to the Rogers Park neighborhood of Chicago and continued fantasy and science-fiction art. For publisher Donning/Starblaze, Foglio illustrated the MythAdventures series of fantasy novels by Robert Lynn Asprin, and he later adapted the first book, Another Fine Myth, into an eight-issue comic-book series from WaRP Graphics. The WaRP work eventually led to comic-book assignments from DC Comics (Angel and the Ape, Plastic Man and Stanley and His Monster miniseries), Marvel Comics, and First Comics (back-up stories in issues of Grimjack and scripting over Doug Rice's plots in Dynamo Joe). He also joined the Moebius theatre group, and he held regular meetings and poker parties for the local science fiction community.

Foglio initiated his long-running character Buck Godot for the publication Just Imagine, published by Denny Meisinger. Basing the humorous science-fiction detective on a real-life friend, John Buckley, Foglio "did a couple of those in the black-and-whites and then Donning said they wanted Buck Godot graphic novels", two of which followed.

== Later work ==
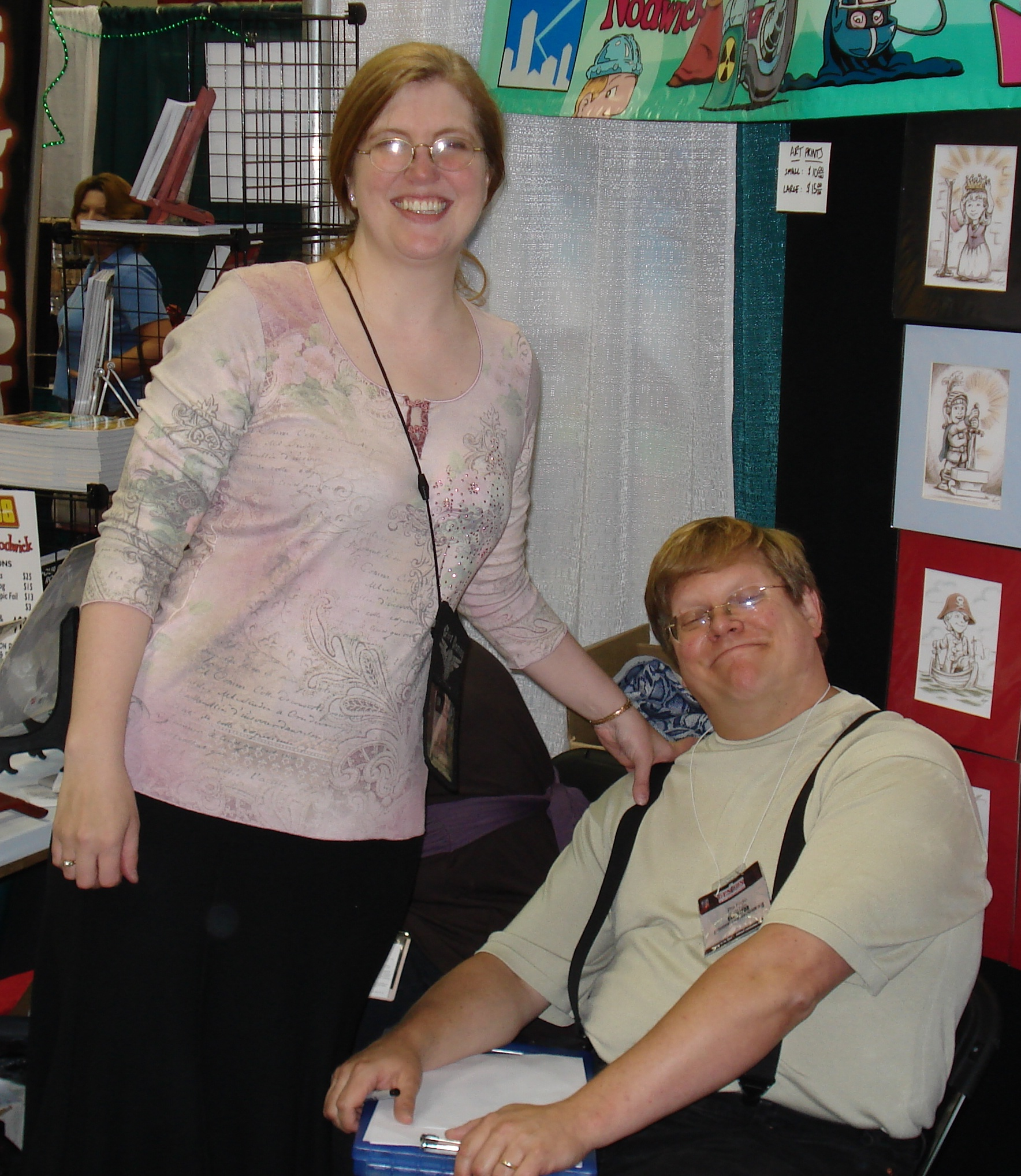
The Foglios at Gen Con Indy 2007

In the 1990s, Foglio met and married his wife, Kaja. The two contributed art to the collectible card game Magic: The Gathering, from Wizards of the Coast and resurrected the comic strip What's New with Phil & Dixie for that company's Duelist magazine.

During this decade, Foglio co-founded Palliard Press and published additional comics, including a new Buck Godot series and the whimsical erotic series XXXenophile. The Foglios later founded Studio Foglio and began to produce the steampunk-fantasy series Girl Genius.

In April 2005, the Foglios abandoned publishing periodical-style comic books and began publishing Girl Genius online as a free webcomic, updated three times a week. Foglio told an interviewer that as of November 2005, "[W]e've quadrupled our number of readers, and tripled our sales" of traditional comics and related merchandise.

== Awards ==
In 1976, the slide show The Capture, which Robert Asprin wrote and Foglio illustrated, was nominated for the Hugo Award for Best Dramatic Presentation; in the same year, he was nominated for the Hugo Award for Best Fan Artist for the first time. Foglio won the Fan Artist Hugo twice, in 1977 and 1978. He was nominated for the Hugo Award for Best Professional Artist in 2008.

He, his wife (Kaja Foglio), and their colorist (Cheyenne Wright) won the first graphic story Hugo for Girl Genius, Volume 8: Agatha Heterodyne and the Chapel of Bones in 2009. The three again won the award for subsequent volumes in 2010 and 2011. Having won the Hugo Award for Best Graphic Story in all three of its first three years, Kaja, Phil, and Cheyenne announced that, in order to show that the category was a "viable award" (with quality competitors besides themselves), they were refusing nomination for the following year (2012). Girl Genius was once again nominated for a Hugo in 2014, but did not win.

In 1993, he was awarded the Inkpot Award.

Foglio won a Reuben divisional award from the National Cartoonist Society for Best Online Comics: Long Form for 2022.

== Works co-authored ==
- What's New with Phil & Dixie (comic strip) in Dragon Magazine #49–84 (1980s) and Duelist (1990s), collected in three comic book volumes now available online
- What's New with Phil & Dixie (comic strip) in Dragon #266–311 & 359 (2000s)
- ffantasy ffactory comic book:
  - D'Arc Tangent #1 of a planned 16-issue series (no other issues were ever released). Collaboration with Freff, Lucie Chin, and Melissa Ann Singer
- First Comics comic books:
  - Grimjack #15, 23, 40 (Munden's Bar features)
  - Dynamo Joe #4–15, Special (script)
- DC Comics comic books:
  - Angel and the Ape #1–4 (Feb.–May 1993), miniseries
  - Plastic Man miniseries (script)
  - Stanley and His Monster miniseries
- Buck Godot comic books:
  - Buck Godot: Zap Gun for Hire graphic novel
  - Buck Godot: Psmith graphic novel
  - Buck Godot: The Gallimaufry series #1–8
- Girl Genius comic book series #1– (ongoing)
- Agatha H Girl Genius prose novels:
  - Agatha H and the Airship City 2011, ISBN 978-1-59780-211-6 Night Shade Books
  - Agatha H and the Clockwork Princess 2012, ISBN 978-1-59780-222-2 Night Shade Books
  - Agatha H and the Voice of the Castle 2014, ISBN 978-1-59780-295-6 Night Shade Books
  - Agatha H. and the Siege of Mechanicsburg 2020, ISBN 978-1-949102-27-7 Night Shade Books
  - Agatha H. and the City Of Lightning tbd
  - Agatha H. and the Her Undying Majesty tbd
- XXXenophile comic books #1–10, collected volumes 1–6
- Novel Illegal Aliens with Nick Pollotta
- That Darn Squid God!, fantasy/humor novel, as James Clay with Nick Pollotta
- Co-author of Dealer's Choice: The Complete Handbook of Saturday Night Poker, with James Ernest and Mike Selinker
- The Night Sheriff, solo authored fantasy novel, Prince of Cats Literary Productions, 2021.

== Works illustrated ==
- MythAdventures series of novels by Robert Lynn Asprin (illustrations) (Donning/Starblaze editions only):
  - Another Fine Myth ISBN 978-0-915442-54-6
  - Myth Conceptions ISBN 978-0-915442-94-2
  - Myth Directions ISBN 978-0-89865-250-5
  - Hit or Myth ISBN 978-0-89865-331-1
  - Myth-ing Persons ISBN 978-0-89865-379-3
  - Little Myth Marker ISBN 978-0-89865-413-4
  - M.Y.T.H. Inc. Link ISBN 978-0-89865-472-1
  - Myth-nomers and Im-perv-ections ISBN 978-0-89865-529-2
  - M.Y.T.H. Inc. in Action ISBN 978-0-89865-787-6
  - Sweet Myth-tery of Life ISBN 978-0-89865-859-0
  - Myth-taken Identity ISBN 978-1-59222-029-8
  - Class Dis-Mythed ISBN 978-1-59222-092-2
  - Myth-Gotten Gains ISBN 978-1-59222-105-9
- MythAdventures Omnibus editions
  - Robert Asprin's Myth Adventures Volume 1 ISBN 978-1-59222-111-0
  - Robert Asprin's Myth Adventures Volume 2 ISBN 978-1-59222-113-4
- MythFortunes: the MythAdventures board game
- WaRP Graphics comic books:
  - MythAdventures! #1–8 (1980s) (after #8 Foglio left and the series was continued with other artists)
    - Reprinted as two graphic novels, in color and with additional art
- Over 50 cards from the collectible card game Magic: The Gathering
- Metal miniatures and covers to the board game Robo Rally
- Illustrations for several games by Spiderweb Software (Nethergate, Avernum 1–3)
- Cover of Bureau 13: Stalking the Night Fantastic by Tri Tac Games
- Illustrated GURPS Illuminati University (aka GURPS IOU) with Kaja Foglio. The dark to humorous Illuminati University setting for Steve Jackson Games GURPS Role Playing Game system.
- Illustrated cards for Space Pirate Amazon Ninja Catgirls, Fade Manley's game published by Steve Jackson Games
- Illustrated CD album cover for Beatnik Turtle's The Cheapass Album for James Ernest's Cheapass Games
- Illustrated several cards in various publications of the Munchkin series of card games
- Cover to The Antikythera Mechanism, music album by Nathaniel Johnstone, 2014
