= Myth Directions =

1982 fantasy novel by Robert Asprin

- Cover of the first edition (published by Starblaze. Art by Phil Foglio.
- Author: Robert Asprin
- Language: English
- Publication date: 1982

Myth Directions is a 1982 fantasy novel by American writer Robert Asprin, the third novel in the MythAdventures series.

== Plot synopsis ==
Tananda wanted to get Aahz a birthday present, so she decides to rope Skeeve in to help find her a unique present for Skeeve's mentor. After travelling through several dimensions Skeeve hasn't managed to eat anything on the journey so Tananda takes him to Jahk, a dimension where the people are either too skinny or are overweight. When they arrive in Jahk they find themselves in the middle of a celebration, which they later find out that Ta-hoe (the city where they are) has recently won "The Big Game". When Tananda sees the trophy she has a eureka moment and decides to steal it. But everything is not all that it seems. When they implement their plan they find the trophy gone and the alarms sounded! Skeeve manages to escape back to Klah (his home dimension) but, Tananda gets captured. After a brief explanation to Aahz the two of them head to Jahk to rescue Tanda.

They arrive back in Jahk and with the help of a native guide called Griffin they found out what happened to the trophy. The preparations for the upcoming war between Tahoe and Veygus (the city who Ta-hoe competes against in "The Big Game") seemed stupid to Skeeve, but Aahz was showing more respect than seemed imaginable towards the Jahks. They also found out that the magician who was holding Tananda captive. was actually Quigley (from Another Fine Myth). Unfortunately Skeeve makes a rash promise which makes escape for Tananda a lot harder.

After that, Aahz and Skeeve went to Veygus to steal the trophy back. They went to the Veygus magician Massha to see what the security was like for the trophy. When they found out that they could only steal the trophy when it was on parade they created a diversion to make sure no-one was around when the stole the trophy.

After stealing the trophy Skeeve finally told Aahz why they tried to steal the trophy in the first place. When Aahz finds out he becomes very reluctant to part with it, but it gave him a plan. They beat the Jahks at their own game... literally.

After pulling a team together they play "The Big Game" against Ta-hoe and Veygus. In the game after Aahz "gets knocked out cold" Skeeve manages to get Tananda to play so they win 1 and a half to 1 and a half to 1.

== Reception ==
Dave Langford reviewed Myth Directions for White Dwarf #40, and stated that "It's a harmless and quite likeable little book, and undemanding fantasy romp: Asprin does seem to be improving."

== Reviews ==
- Review by Cynthia Haldeman (1981) in Shadows of ... Science Fiction and Fantasy Magazine, #5 Fall 1981, (1981)
- Review by Roger C. Schlobin (1983) in Fantasy Newsletter, #57 March 1983
- Review by Robert Coulson (1983) in Amazing Science Fiction, July 1983
- Review by Tom Easton (1983) in Analog Science Fiction/Science Fact, August 1983
- Review by Ken Lake (1991) in Paperback Inferno, #89

== Sources ==
1. Mythadventures.net
2. Myth Directions (Myth, book 3) by Robert Asprin
