= Buck Godot =

Buck Godot is the title character in a science fiction/comedy comic book series collected in two volumes (Buck Godot: Zap Gun for Hire and Buck Godot: PSmIth) and assorted comic books, including the eight-issue "Gallimaufry" series; these were all written and drawn by their creator, Phil Foglio.

== Publication history ==
The first Buck Godot story appeared in issue #2 (summer 1982) of the anthology comic book Just Imagine, published by Just Imagine Graphix. More Buck Godot stories followed in issues #3 (1982) and #5 (spring 1983). A fourth story written by John J Buckley Jr. and penciled by Doug Rice, which has never been reprinted, appeared in #8 (winter 1984). In 1986, the three stories by Foglio were colored and compiled along with a new fourth story in Buck Godot: Zap Gun for Hire, a graphic novel published by Starblaze Graphics. This was followed in 1987 by a full-length graphic novel, Buck Godot: PSmIth, also published by Starblaze.

A single-page Buck Godot story also appeared in E-Man #9 (December 1983).

In 1993, Foglio began publishing the 8-issue limited series Buck Godot - Zap Gun for Hire through Palliard Press. Six issues were published on a semi-annual basis. After Palliard Press dissolved, the final two issues were published starting in 1997 by Studio Foglio. The series was later collected in a trade paperback as Buck Godot: The Gallimaufry.

After successfully moving Girl Genius from a printed comic book series to a webcomic in 2006, Studio Foglio began to serialize the existing Buck Godot stories as a webcomic. The webcomic started running on January 9, 2007, and updated three times a week. As of June 2009, the last Buck Godot comic has been posted (except for the second story in the first volume, concerning the Planetary Temperance League and one of Lou's employees that featured some nudity and one page story "The Gauntlet" parodies the old Hostess pie ads from E-Man #9, and a lost short story from GASP! magazine) and updates have now ceased. Though this has been offline since sometime in February 2016, along with webcomic republications of What's New with Phil & Dixie and MythAdventures, when Airship Entertainment's old website broke down.

Studio Foglio hinted at a possible printed (re-)publication of Godot "in late Spring [2016]".

== Overview ==
Buck's adventures take place in a future where humanity has joined an interstellar coalition known as the Gallimaufry. Human colonization and exploitation has resulted in the development of various human and mutant sub-species, as well as methods such as terraforming (altering marginally habitable worlds into environments where humans can thrive) and pantropy (genetically altering humans to thrive on marginally habitable worlds). Humanity has also become the custodian of The Winslow, an immortal, indestructible, sentient small fuzzy alligator-like creature that usually doesn't do anything more than say "Hi!", and is highly sought after by other species for various reasons.

However, the chaotic nature of human expansion into space has resulted in two Great Checks: a powerful alien intelligence known as Lord Thezmothete, who prevents humans and other species from exploiting pre-spaceflight civilizations; and the emergence of the Law Machines, intelligent robots that enforce the law in all places. The Law Machines always enforce the letter of the written law, to the extent that several planets were forced to change governments when corrupt or neglectful officials were arrested en masse. Since someone arrested by the Law is never seen again, human colonies are wary about accepting the presence of a Law Machine in their society.

The Law's presence and methods have led to a noticeable decline in "real governments", because they tend not to be able to function in the harsh scrutiny of The Law. In their place have risen guilds like X-Tel, which specialize in helping disgruntled colonists move and resettle to places where The Law has a weaker presence.

The sole exception to the Law's jurisdiction is the colony of New Hong Kong. The planetary government there wound up being protected from the 'protection' of the Law Machines when a hacker entered a new 'law' to be voted into place (and it was, overwhelmingly): There shall be no laws on New Hong Kong. The hacker was subsequently arrested, but since the Law Machines are programmed not to interfere in society except when enforcing official laws, they became powerless to act on New Hong Kong thanks to this new (and only) 'law'. The planet had already been a haven to many of the worst criminals and other anti-social humans and aliens, and has become even more so now that it offers safety from the Machines (the Law Machine assigned to New Hong Kong "moonlights as its conscience").

New Hong Kong is the home base of the series' eponymous protagonist, Buckminster "Buck" Godot, a quick-witted mercenary whose motto is "Always available, but never free". He was once a security chief of the corrupt X-Tel Corporation, but "retired" from their service after an ethical dispute, damaging their headquarters and stealing a starship as he left (in what Godot later cheekily described as "taking his pension in a lump sum").

Buck mostly hangs around Asteroid Al's bar on New Hong Kong, waiting for work to come to him. His normal fee is in the five to six-figure range, plus expenses and sometimes, given the amount of property damage he causes, those expenses can be pretty high. He follows strict ethical standards in all his dealings, which sometimes surprises his clients. One of the mottos of New Hong Kong is, "Just because there are no laws, that doesn't mean there are no rules".

== Powers, abilities and weapons ==
Buck Godot is a Hoffmanite, a variant human race from a world with a heavy gravity environment. His rotund appearance conceals high muscular density, giving him incredible (but not quite superhuman) strength, stamina and metabolic endurance (he can drink high amounts of alcohol with little effect). He can also move deceptively quickly and efficiently for a man of his size.

Buck is also a fast thinker, shown setting up and executing very elaborate schemes on short notice. His skills are impressive enough to be worthy of respect by no less than Lord Thezmothete, the single most advanced being in the galaxy.

Buck is an expert marksman, able to shoot his way out of almost any situation. His normal "zap gun" is Junior, a white or chromed laser pistol which fires cartridge-loaded energy blasts (a much larger gun, Senior, may be glimpsed on his apartment wall). He is also an expert pilot, operating small personal craft around New Hong Kong as well as interstellar spacecraft.

== Known associates & antagonists ==
Buck's best friend is Louisa "Lou" Dem Five, the asteroid-born madam of the Velvet Fist bordello. Lou is a former agent of the Planetary Temperance League, but finds her current profession more to her liking, and has successfully tempted several of her fellow agents to work for her. Her human-variant alteration gives her voluntary control over glands in her body that exude an intensely-powerful pheromone that can entice anyone (at least, anyone with a healthy sex drive). Lou has employed Buck on several occasions, usually surprised that he prefers payment in cash instead of "trade". Buck's response is generally that she is "too small", a reference to the fact that Hoffmanites are so large, heavy, and strong, once joking that they could have a go if she gained about 400 pounds.

Buck's other friend is Asteroid Al, a Thuxian (an eyeless alien species roughly resembling the creatures from the Alien franchise), who is known for being stingy about money and contracts. The drinks served at his bar can intoxicate the unwary almost immediately. Buck's drink of choice is the "ion sucker", whose containers also make useful weapons (as well as components for flower arranging). Other cronies at Al's Bar include Spug, a frog-faced alien cabbie who has trouble keeping secrets. Beyond these, Buck is a well-known face at Asteroid Al's, and indeed throughout most of New Hong Kong.

Buck's notable antagonists have included the aforementioned X-Tel Corporation, the human collective mind PSmIth (read as "Smithe", referencing the "psi" shortening of "psychic"), the high-grade thief and assassin named Der Rock the Destroyer and the notorious space pirate known as the Pistol Packin' Polaris Packrat (a sentient who has the dubious honor of being the only creature Buck will deal with for free; Al suspects that there's someone out there paying Buck to breathe) with his two talking laser pistols, Smith and Wesson, who have some history with Junior and lament that he "isn't speaking to them".

In the 8-part "Gallimaufry" series, Buck travels to the eponymous space station – acting as a sort of United Nations in space - and meets a new group of friends, allies, and enemies. These include the Prime Mover, an immortal and omnipotent alien lifeform who has a deal with humanity to prevent their extinction, Ambassador Whreee of the Klegdixal, a paranoid and conniving alien race and oft-time political rival of humanity, Parahexavoctal, chief of security of the entire Gallimaufry, and Buck's uncle and fellow Hoffmanite, Frakkus Godot.

== See also ==
- Studio Foglio
