= Massha =

Massha may refer to:

- Massha (shrine), a small Japanese shrines entrusted to the care of a larger shrine
- Massha, a character in Robert Asprin's MythAdventures
