= Illegal Alien =

Illegal Alien or Illegal Aliens may refer to:

- Alien (law), legal concept of aliens
  - Illegal alien, the statutory and legal term used in some countries for an illegal immigrant or other unauthorized resident
  - Illegal aliens (Library of Congress Subject Heading), replaced with the heading "Noncitizens" in 2021
  - Enemy alien

== Entertainment ==
- Illegal Aliens (film), a 2007 film starring Anna Nicole Smith and Chyna
- Illegal Aliens (novel), a 1989 science fiction novel by Nick Pollotta and Phil Foglio
- Illegal Alien (Sawyer novel), a 1997 science fiction novel by Robert J. Sawyer
- Illegal Alien (Tucker and Perry novel), a 1997 Doctor Who novel by Mike Tucker & Robert Perry
- Illegal Alien, a graphic novel by James Robinson
- "Illegal Alien" (song), a track on the album Genesis by Genesis (1983)
- "Illegal Aliens" (My Hero), a 2005 television episode
