= XXXenophile (collectible card game) =

Collectible card game

- Cardback of the XXXenophile CCG
- Designers: James Ernest
- Publishers: Slag-Blah Entertainment
- Playing time: ~ 1 hour
- Chance: Some
- Skills: Card playing; Arithmetic; Basic reading ability

XXXenophile is a mature-themed science fiction and fantasy collectible card game based on the XXXenophile comic book, and was published by Slag-Blah Entertainment in 1996.

== Publication history ==
A collectible card game based on the XXXenophile comic was created, with game mechanics designed by James Ernest; it was the first adult-themed CCG (with adult mechanics—some cards contained directions for the player to remove a piece of clothing). It was designed after positive reader reaction to the tenth issue of the comic's cover, which showed cards for a hypothetical XXXenophile CCG.

In 2001 this game was reworked into a non-adult, non-collectible card game called Girl Genius: The Works, based on the Foglios' comic Girl Genius.

== Reception ==
Pyramid magazine reviewed XXXenophile and stated that "Taking XXXenophile that seriously would be difficult, as well as perverse; the instructions and most of the rules are actually printed in mini-comic form to prevent this, and you can learn the basics during your coffee break."

== Reviews ==
- InQuest #17
