= GURPS IOU =

1995 supplement for the GURPS role-playing game

Welcome to Illuminati University!
- Designers: Elizabeth McCoy; Walter Milliken
- Publishers: Steve Jackson Games
- Publication: 1995; 31 years ago
- Systems: GURPS third edition

GURPS IOU: Welcome to Illuminati University! is a comedy sourcebook for the GURPS (Generic Universal Role-Playing System), written by Elizabeth McCoy and Walter Milliken, and published by Steve Jackson Games in 1995.

== Contents ==
The book details a fictional college where absurdity and awful puns are the order of the day; its students range from witches and werewolves to secret agents and space aliens. Adventures can involve joining fraternities, surviving dorm life, dealing with rampaging lab accidents, conquering other worlds on field trips, getting caught up in faculty bloodfeuds and even attempting to pass a class.

Characters from every GURPS setting can be fitted into the campaign with little or no difficulty. The setting shares much in common with the equally bizarre game Teenagers from Outer Space. Agatha Heterodyne, from the Foglios' Girl Genius, is also featured in the book.

== Publication history ==
GURPS IOU was published as a 128-page softbound sourcebook by Steve Jackson Games. The authors are Elizabeth McCoy and Walter Milliken; the illustrations are by Phil Foglio and Kaja Foglio.

The setting began life as an online campaign run on the Steve Jackson Games BBS Illuminati Online. It was codified into a book for the third edition of GURPS.

== Reception ==
Rick Swan reviewed GURPS IOU for Dragon magazine #228 (April 1996). Noting SJG's success with the Illuminati: New World Order card game, he commented that "despite its title, GURPS IOU has nothing to do with cards. Nor, for that matter, does it have much to do with the GURPS Illuminati supplement of a few years back. IOU looks like a setting for the GURPS role-playing game – and indeed, it has its share of game stats and adventure hooks – but the anything-goes, logic-down-the-dumper approach makes it virtually unplayable, at least by anyone who takes their games even semi-seriously. So what is it? Basically, IOU is a glorified joke book, a drop of Monty Python mixed with a bucket of Three Stooges." Swan concluded his review by saying: "Maybe you consider yourself too sophisticated for silly stuff like this. But you've gotta admit – Democrats for Cthulhu, that’s pretty good."

== Reviews ==
- Australian Realms #28

== See also ==
- List of GURPS publications
