= Xenophile =

Xenophile may refer to:

- Xenophilia, affection for unknown or foreign objects or peoples
- Xenophile Records, a world music record label
- XXXenophile, an American erotic comic book series
