= Girl Genius: The Works =

Card game

- Designers: James Ernest
- Illustrators: Phil Foglio and James Ernest
- Publishers: Cheapass Games
- Players: 2 or more
- Setup time: 2 minutes
- Playing time: 30 minutes
- Chance: medium
- Age range: 10 and up
- Skills: none

Girl Genius: The Works is a card game announced in March 2001 as scheduled for an April 2001 release, and was out by summer as it was reviewed in July 2001. It is played with a specially designed deck of 108 cards. The game, designed by Phil Foglio and James Ernest, takes its theme from the "gaslamp fantasy" of the Girl Genius comic book series. The goal is to be the first player to reach 100 points by "popping" cards out of a two-dimensional layout.

Unlike most games published by Cheapass Games at that time, Girl Genius: The Works has high-quality laminated cards with detailed designs. It was nominated for two Origins Awards (Best Abstract Card Game and Best Graphic Presentation of a Card Game) in 2001, but did not win in either category. (The awards went to Cosmic Coasters and Zombies!!!, respectively.)

== Mechanics ==
Girl Genius: The Works uses gaming mechanics similar to those in the collectible card game XXXenophile, based on Foglio's earlier graphic-novel work. XXXenophile's gameplay is largely the same as the present game's, except that the former has each player compose a deck from the pool of 270 available cards, while the latter has a fixed 108-card deck. XXXenophile went out of print.

Other differences include the removal of CCG aspects and continuous-effect card types like Gizmos and Settings. The focus is also less prurient.

== Remake ==
22 March 2018 a Kickstarter was launched by Cheapass Games for a new version of Girl Genius: The Works. This version has four sixty-card decks based on major story arcs.

== Rules and Gameplay ==
One of the Racing Submarines.

Each card in the game has symbols along each of its four edges. The symbols, which come in five types, range in number from one to eight. Each card also has a point value between 0 and 9, and most of the cards have instructions which must be followed when the card is popped.

The game starts with the laying out of 12 cards in a lattice pattern ("the Works"), all face-down, except for two corner cards which are positioned face-up. Each player starts with a hand of five cards, and a score pile, which is initially empty. The players then take their turns in order around the table. Each turn consists of five stages:

1. Flip a card. If there are any face-down cards in the Works, flip one face-up.
2. Spin a card. Pick up any one face-up card, spin it 180 degrees, and put it back in its place.
3. Check. Consider in turn each of the four edges of the card you just spun. If the type of symbol on an edge matches the type of the symbol on the neighboring card's edge, then the card with the more symbols "pops" out of the Works. If they have the same number of symbols, both cards pop.
4. Replace cards. Any blank spaces in the Works created by removing cards on this turn are now filled with new cards from the hand of the player who created the blank space. The new cards are always placed face-up, except as detailed in the instruction for "Bärenkönig," whose replacement is played face-down. (If the replacing player runs out of cards, then she must draw cards from the draw pile one at a time to finish the replacement stage.)
5. Draw cards. Each player now draws cards from the draw pile until he has at least five cards. (If a player already has at least five cards, then that player draws no cards.)

=== Popping cards ===
"Popping" a card means that you pick it up, follow its instructions, and then place it in your score pile. If the instructions tell you to pop another card, then the process recurses; you follow the instructions on the new card before putting it in your score pile, and only then do you put the first-popped card in your score pile. (In other words, the current set of popped cards forms a stack.)

=== Game end ===
The game ends as soon as one player has 100 points or more in her score pile, based on the point values of the cards and any complicating factors such as "Dr. Monahan's Diabolical Rat-Stretching Engine". This may happen even in the middle of another player's turn.

The game also ends immediately if a player manages to pop a "Racing Dirigible" while there are two Submarines in his score pile, or a Submarine when there are three Dirigibles in his score pile. In that case, the player who popped the card immediately wins, regardless of anyone else's score.

== Reviews ==
- Syfy
- Pyramid
