= Enemy alien =

Natives of foreign nations during conflicts

In customary international law, an enemy alien is any alien native, citizen, denizen or subject of any foreign nation or government with which a domestic nation or government is in conflict and who is liable to be apprehended, restrained, secured and removed. Usually, the countries are in a state of declared war.

== Australia ==
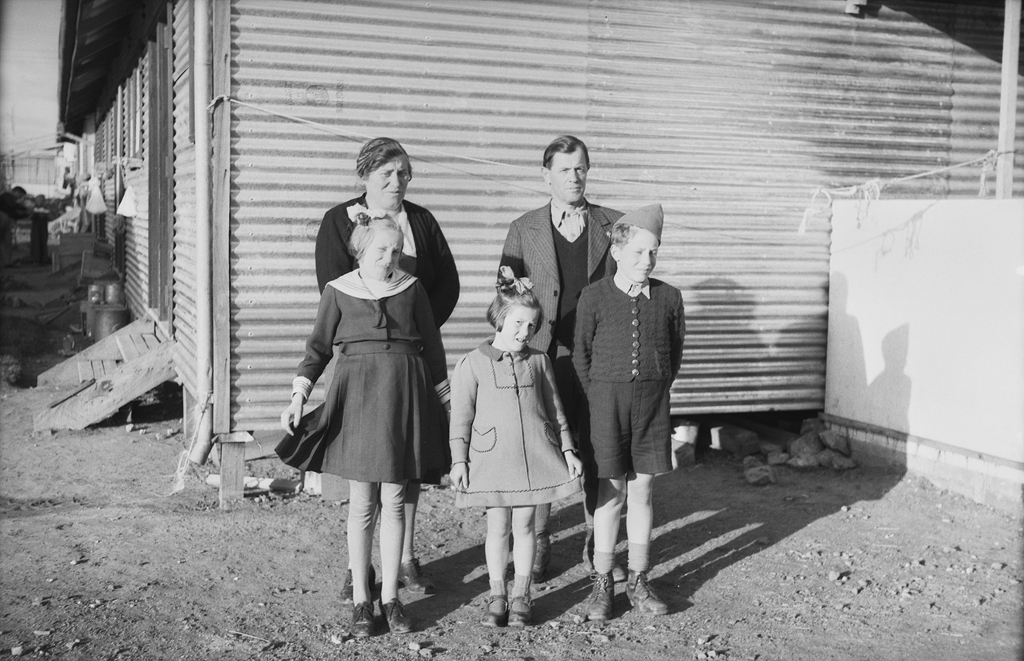
Family held at Tatura Internment Camp 3, Australia, in 1943

In Australia, in the wake of the outbreak of World War II, Jewish refugees and others fleeing the Nazis were classified as "enemy aliens" upon their arrival in Australia if they arrived with German identity papers. Australian law in 1939 designated people "enemy aliens" if they were Germans or were Australians who had been born in Germany; later, it covered Italians and Japanese as well. The Australian government would therefore intern them, sometimes for years until the war ended, in camps such as the isolated Tatura Internment Camp 3 D which held approximately 300 internees thus deemed "enemy aliens", mostly families, including children as young as two years of age, such as Eva Duldig — who two decades later represented the country that had interned her in tennis at Wimbledon.

That internment camp was opened in 1940. It was located near Shepparton, in the northern part of the state of Victoria. There, armed soldiers manned watchtowers and scanned the camp that was bordered by a barbed wire fence with searchlights, and other armed soldiers patrolled the camp. Petitions by many of those interned to Australian politicians, stressing that they were Jewish refugees (such as Karl Duldig, Slawa Duldig, and their toddler) and therefore being unjustly imprisoned, had no effect.

== Canada ==
Since 1914, the War Measures Act was a statute of the Parliament of Canada that provided for internment during war, invasion, or insurrection. The Act was brought into force three times in Canadian history: during Canada's first national internment operations of 1914–1920, the Second World War's internment of Japanese, German, and Italian Canadians and in the 1970 October Crisis. In 1988, it was repealed and replaced by the Emergencies Act.

The terminology used in the act is "alien enemy".

== Germany ==
Ilag were internment camps established by the German Army in World War II to hold Allied civilians, caught in areas that were occupied by the German Army. They included United States citizens caught in Europe by surprise when war was declared in December 1941, and citizens of the British Commonwealth caught in areas engulfed by the Blitzkrieg.

== United Kingdom ==
In 1919, The Aliens Restriction (Amendment) Act, 1919 used the words "other than, former enemy aliens".

In 1924, to avoid disabling German citizen and German companies, a repeal occurred.

At the outbreak of World War II in 1939, the United Kingdom had become a place of refuge for people who had fled Nazi persecution, including Jews and political refugees. At first, with the outbreak of war, the British government – in accordance with its policy of Defence Regulation 18B – placed these refugees with other enemy aliens regardless of their political allegiances. Later on, when Italy also declared war on Britain, some British Italians were also interned as enemy aliens.

The Isle of Man, relatively isolated from the British mainland and with a useful amount of holiday accommodation, was used to provide housing for the "Alien Civilians" (as it had in World War I). There were also efforts to move internees to Canada. In July 1940, the SS Arandora Star was torpedoed by a German U-boat and sunk while transporting Italian and German aliens to North America; 743 died. The 813 surviving prisoners were subsequently included in the 2,500 men transported by HMT Dunera for internment in Australia.

The Pioneer Corps was the only British unit that enemy aliens could serve in early on in the war. Many thousands of Germans and Austrians joined the Pioneer Corps to assist the Allied war efforts and liberation of their home countries. These were mainly Jews and political opponents of the Nazi regime who had fled to Britain while it was still possible, and included the cinematographer Ken Adam, writer George Clare and publisher Robert Maxwell. These men – often dubbed "The King's Most Loyal Enemy Aliens" – later moved on to serve in fighting units. Some were recruited by Special Operations Executive as secret agents.

Serving as German nationals in the British forces was particularly dangerous, since, in case of taken captive, with a high probability they would have been executed as traitors by the Germans. The number of German-born Jews joining the British forces was exceptionally high; by the end of the war, one in seven Jewish refugees from Germany had joined the British Army. Their profound knowledge of the German language and customs proved useful. Many of them served in the administration of the British occupation army in Germany and Austria after the war.

Since 1948, British law also contain the "enemy alien" wording in the British Nationality Act 1948 which states that "Provided that a person shall not be such a citizen by virtue of this section if at the time of his birth— (...) his father is an enemy alien and the birth occurs in a place then under occupation by the enemy.".

Now, the UK is party to the Fourth Geneva Convention which deals with enemy nationality and enemy aliens.

== United States ==
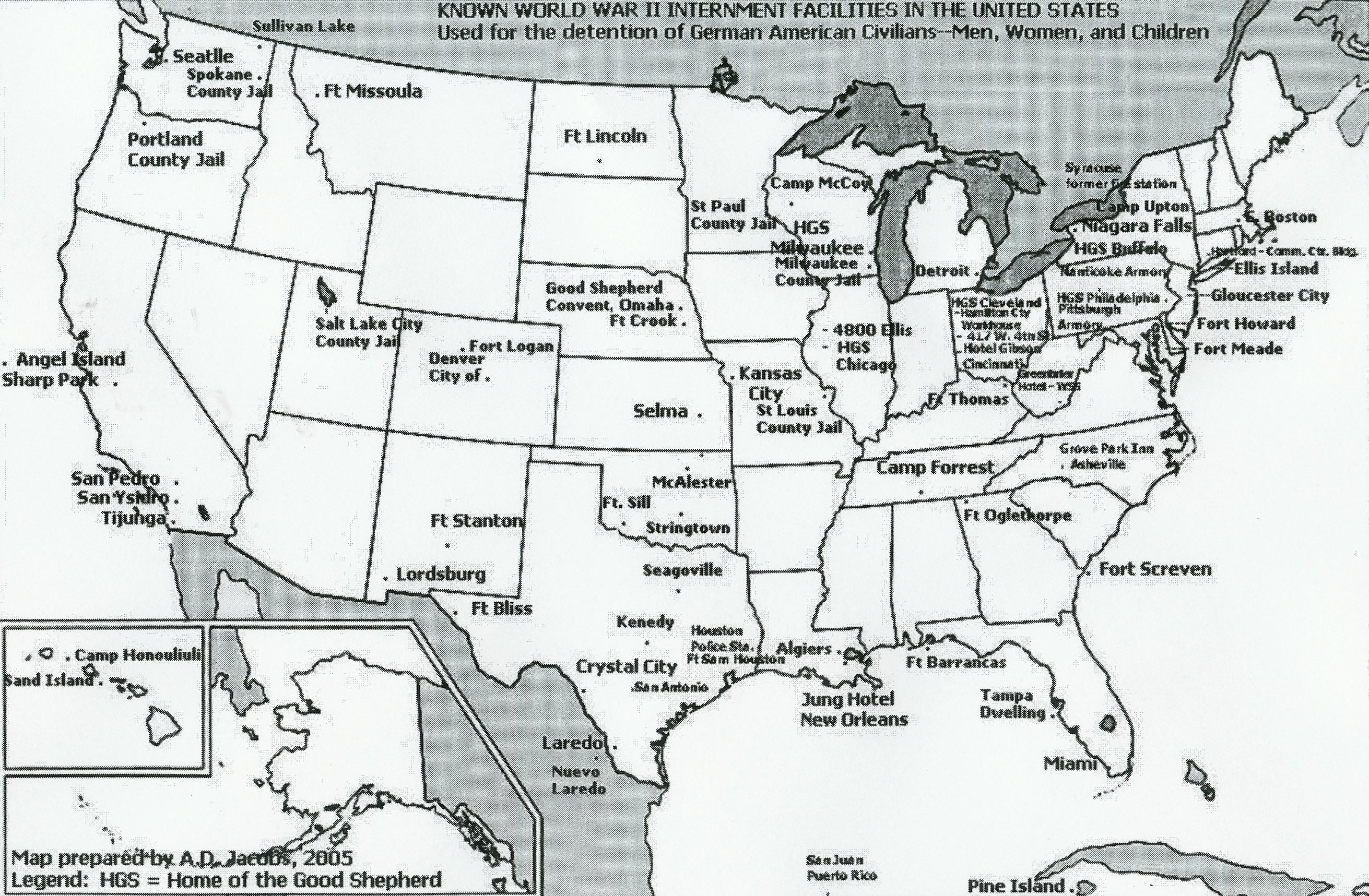
Map depicting the known internment sites wherein German Americans were interned during World War II

A well-known example of enemy aliens was that of the Japanese citizens residing in the United States during World War II. Many of these Japanese and Japanese-Americans were imprisoned in internment camps by President Franklin D. Roosevelt during wartime, alongside many German- and Italian-Americans. However, many Japanese-Americans and Italian-Americans were not actually "aliens", as they held American citizenship. The term "enemy alien" referred only to non-American citizens who were nationals of Axis countries. Included in this number were thousands of resident aliens who were prohibited from applying for citizenship by race-based naturalization laws; when war was declared against their native countries, their status changed from "resident" to "enemy" alien. Therefore, German American, Italian American, and Japanese American permanent residents were classified as enemy aliens and interned as such.

In total 10,905 Italian Americans and approximately 110,000 Japanese Americans were interned in many different camps and sites across the country. German Americans were held in more than 50 different locations.

Citizens of an enemy country who lived in the United States during World War II were required to have an "Enemy Alien" card, and to register monthly with the authorities.

== See also ==
- Illegal Alien (disambiguation)
