= Beatnik Turtle =

Beatnik Turtle is an indie rock band from Chicago formed in 1998. Beatnik Turtle plays alternative and pop-rock "with a sense of humor." Their sound is rooted in the song-based pop-rock sound of They Might Be Giants, Fountains of Wayne, The Saw Doctors, Barenaked Ladies, Cracker, Cake, and The Beatles.

In 2007, Beatnik Turtle began TheSongOfTheDay.com, where they released an original, free-to-download song every day during 2007 as a podcast. This was accomplished in part through the involvement of numerous "guest" musicians and other creative individuals who contributed their efforts to the project. The band has continued this format, in a modified form, since 2008 with The Song of the Week.

In 2006, Beatnik Turtle published an online guide for indie bands called the Indie Band Survival Guide, written by sax player Randy Chertkow. The guide shares the band's experiences running and being in an indie band. The guide was published in book form in 2008 with co-author credit to band member/founder, Jason Feehan. A second edition of the guide was released in 2012.

== Band members ==
- Beatnik Turtle band members include:
  - Jason Feehan - Vocals, Guitar
  - Randy Chertkow - Saxes, Vocals
  - Dave Hallock - Trumpet
  - Mike Combopiano - Trumpet
  - Chris Joyce - Trumpet
  - Chip Hinshaw - Trombone
  - John Owens - Drums, Vocals
  - Tom Roper - Guitar
  - Tom Susala - Bass Guitar
  - Ryan Lockhart - Vocals

A number of other musicians frequently perform with Beatnik Turtle.

== Discography ==
- Beatnik Turtle has released 20 albums:
  - The Best of The Song of The Day (2014)
  - When I Was Your Age (Beatnik Turtle album)|When I Was Your Age (2009), featuring guest performance by George Hrab
  - The Song of The Day.Com -- December (2008)
  - The Song of The Day.Com -- November (2008)
  - The Song of The Day.Com -- October (2008)
  - The Song of The Day.Com -- September (2008)
  - The Song of The Day.Com -- August (2008)
  - The Song of The Day.Com -- July (2008)
  - The Song of The Day.Com -- June (2008)
  - The Song of The Day.Com -- May (2008)
  - The Song of The Day.Com -- April (2008)
  - The Song of The Day.Com -- March (2008)
  - The Song of The Day.Com -- February (2008)
  - The Song of The Day.Com -- January (2008)
  - Sham Rock (Beatnik Turtle album)|Sham Rock (2008)
  - All In A Day's Work (2007)
  - Thanks For Coming Out! Beatnik Turtle Live! (2006)
  - The Cheapass Album (2004) (Music based on games from Cheapass Games, with album cover art by Phil Foglio)
  - Santa Doesn't Like You (2002) (also known as "The Un-Holiday Album")
  - What We've Got (2001)

== Notable Airplay ==
- All Songs Considered
- Chicago Public Radio's
- Dr. Demento
- Jonathon Brandmeier

== Notable Live Performances ==
- Chicago's Second City ETC
