= What's New with Phil & Dixie =

Gaming parody comic by Phil Foglio

- The characters of What's New, Phil Foglio (left, an author self-insert) and Dixie Null
- Author: Phil Foglio
- Website: airshipentertainment.com/growf.html - dead link, archived here
- Launch date: 1980
- End date: 2003
- Publisher(s): Dragon Magazine (1980-1984, 1999-2003); The Duelist (1993-1999)
- Genre: Parody

What's New with Phil & Dixie is a gaming parody comic by Phil Foglio. What's New was Foglio's first comic, and it was published in the magazines Dragon and The Duelist, as well as in print collections and online.

== Premise ==
The comic stars Phil Foglio, along with Dixie Null, as they explore the world of gaming, particularly tabletop RPGs, with a mixture of reportage and advice to the reader. Strips created for The Duelist magazine focused on Magic: The Gathering.

A long-running joke revolved around the often promised and often delayed "Sex in D&D" segment. This segment never appeared in magazine printings, but was finally written and included as additional material in one of the strip's book printings.

== Original magazine publications ==
In an interview, Foglio said that What's New was his start in comics, and it was first published in Dragon magazine in 1980. In another interview, Foglio said that he had done some covers for Dragon, and he noted he could earn much more for similar effort if he added jokes.

The comic first appeared in Dragon shortly before issue #50 and ran until issue #84, when Foglio stopped the comic to work on other projects. According to Wizards, characters from What's New appeared in issue #5 of another Foglio work, a comic book adaptation of Another Fine Myth.

What's New was revived for a run in The Duelist magazine, also published by Wizards of the Coast. It ran in The Duelist from 1993 to 1999, ending when publication of The Duelist ceased.

After the end of The Duelist, the comic returned to Dragon and ran there from 1999 to 2003 (issues 265–311), plus a final "farewell" installment Dragon #359, the last issue of Dragon in print.

== Book printings and online publication ==
The entire run in Dragon, plus additional material, was published in two print collections by Palliard Press.

In 2001 a third volume was published by Studio Foglio collecting all the Duelist magazine strips, along with some bonus content.

From 2007 to 2010, What's New was republished on Foglio's website as a weekly webcomic. This has been offline since February 2016, along with webcomic republications of Buck Godot and MythAdventures, when Airship Entertainment's old website broke down.

== Reception ==
The author and blogger Cory Doctorow has said he loved What's New when he was a kid.
