= Kaja Foglio =

American writer, artist, and publisher (born 1970)

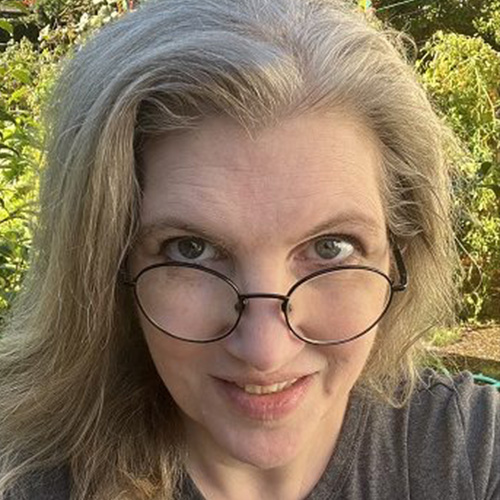
- Foglio in 2025
- Born: Kaja Marie Murphy; January 12, 1970 (age 56); Bellevue, Washington, U.S.
- Education: University of Washington
- Occupations: Writer, artist
- Spouse: Phil Foglio

Kaja Marie Foglio (born January 12, 1970) is a Seattle-based writer, artist, and publisher. Foglio co-won the first Hugo Award for Best Graphic Story in 2009 for Girl Genius, Volume 8: Agatha Heterodyne and the Chapel of Bones, a series which went on to win two more Hugo Awards.

== Biography ==
=== Early life and education ===
Born Kaja Murphy in Bellevue, Washington, Kaja was raised in Kirkland, Washington. She graduated from Juanita High School in Kirkland, Washington in 1988. She attended the University of Washington, where she was heavily involved with the local chapter of the Society for Creative Anachronism. She graduated from the University of Washington, and she married Phil Foglio in 1993.

=== Career ===
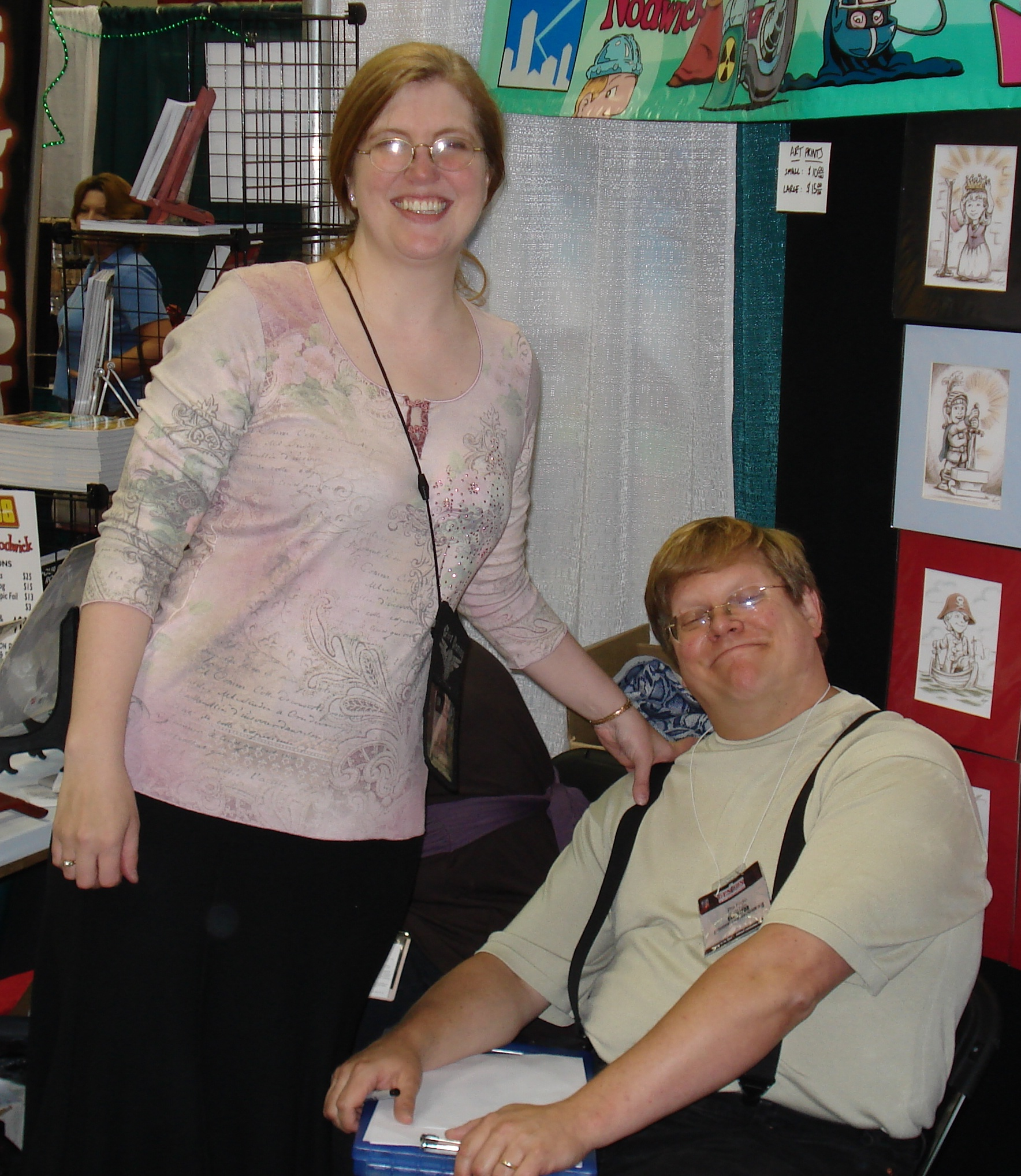
Kaja and Phil Foglio at Gen Con Indy 2007

Kaja, with Phil, founded Studio Foglio, LLC in 1995. The studio became the venue for her art prints, many of which have been produced as cards for Magic: The Gathering. Kaja Foglio co-writes and illustrates the webcomic Girl Genius with Phil Foglio. She coined the term "gaslamp fantasy" to describe its genre of 19th century ahistorical fantasy.

She serves as the chief graphic designer and webmaster for the Studio Foglio and Airship Entertainment websites. Foglio also contributes to other projects, including providing the illustrations Barry Hughart's anthology of The Chronicles of Master Li and Number Ten Ox.

In 2009 the Foglios and their colorist, Cheyenne Wright, won the first Hugo Award for Best Graphic Story, for Girl Genius, Volume 8: Agatha Heterodyne and the Chapel of Bones. In 2010, 2011 they won the Hugo Award for Best Graphic Story again. Having won the Hugo Award for Best Graphic Story for three years running, Kaja, Phil, and Cheyenne announced that, in order to show that the category was a "viable award", they refused nomination for the following year (2012). After the 2012 refusal, they were against finalists in 2013.

== Works illustrated ==
- Cat on the Dovrefjell (1997)
- The Chronicles of Master Li and Number Ten Ox (1998)
- Magic: The Gathering trading cards
- Shadowfist trading cards

== Works co-authored ==
- What's New with Phil and Dixie (1999; OCLC 60348876)
- Girl Genius series (1995–ongoing). As of 2025 comprising 23 graphic novels, each titled Agatha Heterodyne and the ..., and four prose novels, each titled Agatha H and the ....
