= Illegal Aliens (novel) =

1989 novel by Nick Pollotta

Illegal Aliens is a science fiction comedy novel written by Nick Pollotta and Phil Foglio.

== Premise ==
The crew of the starship, All That Glitters, land on Earth to teasing its primitive natives, but the alien tricksters encounter a ruthless New York City street gang, the Bloody Deckers. A 'First Contact Team', who have been waiting years for aliens to land, now find the world in chaos and have to either rescue the aliens from the gang, or work with the gang to save Earth from the aliens.

== Plot summary ==
=== Part One ===
A perfectly spherical white spaceship lands in Central Park to great global excitement, from which Leader Idow, an alien covered in blue fur, claims that his crew represent a Type III civilization that will test Earth's worthiness to be a member planet of their federation. Unbeknownst to the United Nations, the aliens are criminals (the equivalent of juvenile delinquents) who seek out planets with levels of technology similar to Earth's so that they can record the global violence and mayhem that will result from Earth's certain failure for their own prurient interests.

The aliens scan the Central Park crowd for potential test subjects where they happen upon a minor New York gang who they identify as the most likely to provide the most entertainment during their "test".

Meanwhile, the United Nations has sent security into New York and identified two new aliens attempting to transport clandestinely to Earth. These aliens are representatives of the Gees, an extraterrestrial law-enforcement body whose mandates include preventing overt contact between space-travelling civilizations and non-space-travelling civilizations.

Unfortunately for the crew of the All That Glitters (a Mikon #4 class ship), the human gang manages to escape the test and infiltrate the ship, where they happen upon the ship's engineer Trell. Threatening Trell, the gang manages to release Omega Gas into the main bridge, killing Idow's crew (except Trell). The gang then holds the ship hostage, asking for pardons and appeasements. The army tricks the gang into accepting a group of beautiful women on board, who are actually army personnel sent to arrest them and take back the ship.

The United Nations' Alien Contact Crew manages to trick the Gees into believing that Trell has been dissected and liquefied for experimentation just before the Gees leave and set up a massive quarantine around Earth.

=== Part Two ===
The human race, through Trell's assistance, has duplicated many of the Mikon #4's technologies, including molecular softening beams, advanced camouflage, horizontal/vertical elevators, and hyperdrive, with the intent to break the Gees' quarantine. They have also learned that the Gees are not the bosses of the galactic federation, merely a police force whose presence is resented by many planets, including some that have been quarantined specifically to prevent their entry into the federation.

Now loose in space, the illegal (human) alien crew of the Earth ship struggles to reach the Galactic League and argue a case for admittance - without getting blown out of existence by the Great Golden Ones (Galactic Police).

== Publication history ==
Illegal Aliens was first published in 1989 by TSR. It was Pollotta's first published work. It was reprinted twice, in 2002 and 2008, and has also been released in ebook form.

Pollotta and Foglio later wrote another novel together, publishing That Darn Squid God in 2004, though Foglio used the pseudonym "James Clay".

== Reception ==
Illegal Aliens was reviewed by well-known science fiction critic and author Tom Easton in the magazine Analog Science Fiction and Fact in 1989.
