= Pam Eklund =

American comic book inker

- Occupations: Comic book artist, Inker
- Years active: 1990s–2000s
- Known for: Comic book illustration and inking
- Notable work: Sonic the Hedgehog, Untold Tales of Spider-Man, Silver Sable

Pam Eklund is an American comic book inker known for her work on comic book titles published by Marvel Comics, DC Comics and Archie Comics.

== Career ==
Eklund worked as an inker in the American comic book industry during the 1990s.

== Bibliography ==
- Sonic the Hedgehog – Archie Comics
- Untold Tales of Spider-Man – Marvel Comics
- Silver Sable and the Wild Pack – Marvel Comics
- The Jaguar – DC Comics
- Action Comics – DC Comics
- Avengers West Coast – Marvel Comics
