= Walter Milliken =

Writer and game designer

Walter Milliken is a writer and game designer who has worked on a number of GURPS products for Steve Jackson Games.

== Career ==
Walter Milliken ran the GURPS Digest discussion list on the internet in the early 1990s. In a lawsuit that received national attention and led to the establishment of the Electronic Frontier Foundation, Milliken and Steve Jackson successfully sued the United States Secret Service in 1993 for illegally seizing computers and electronic information.

Milliken is the co-author of GURPS Illuminati University, and contributor to many GURPS books.

== Personal life ==
He is married to his frequent co-author, Elizabeth McCoy.
