= MythAdventures =

Fantasy novel series by Robert Asprin

MythAdventures or Myth Adventures is a fantasy series created by Robert Lynn Asprin. After twelve novels by Asprin, published 1978 to 2002, he and Jody Lynn Nye continued the series with seven more books that they wrote together. After his death in May 2008, Nye has continued the series on her own.

The Myth Adventures are noted for and popular for their whimsical nature, myriad characters, and liberal use of puns. Apart from the first book, every title turns on the similarity between the word "myth" and the prefix "mis-" or the word "miss". The inaugural title, Another Fine Myth, puns on the phrase "another fine mess". Chapters are usually headed by made-up quotes by famous or semi-famous persons.

The first book was advertised under that title, Another Fine Mess, from Oliver Hardy's often-used catchphrase directed towards his film comedy partner Stan Laurel, supposedly "This is another fine mess you've gotten me into." (The actual catchphrase referred to "another nice mess".) After it was too late to change the catalog, Asprin decided that using "Myth" would be much better if the book would become a series. They changed the title and claimed a typo in the catalog.

According to Asprin, the original inspiration for the Myth Adventures was the Road to ... comedy movie series, which stars Bing Crosby and Bob Hope as wandering con-artists/adventurers.

== Characters ==
The stories mostly revolve around the adventures of a few central characters. These four appear from the outset:

- Skeeve, a youngish journeyman magician from the backwater dimension of Klah.
- Aahz, a green, scaly "demon" (short for "dimension traveler") from the dimension of Perv, a world known for its foul-tempered reptilian humanoid inhabitants. Aahz (short for Aahzmandius) takes Skeeve on as his apprentice, despite having lost his powers through a prank pulled by Skeeve's now-deceased mentor, Garkin, at the beginning of the first novel. Later on, he and Skeeve dissolve their mentor/apprentice relationship and become partners in a magician-for-hire enterprise called M.Y.T.H. Inc.
- Gleep, Skeeve's excitable pet, a baby dragon with a one-word eponymous vocabulary ("Gleep!") that belies his incredible intellect. However, in the twelfth book Gleep speaks simple, short phrases.
- Tananda, a.k.a. Tanda, a professional assassin and Chumley's nymphish Trollop sister.

Gradually, others are added to the mix:

- Massha, a woman of truly monumental girth with bright orange hair and a gaudy fashion sense; she begins the series as "only" an expert user of magical weapons and tools, but eventually apprentices herself to Skeeve.
- Guido and Nunzio, a pair of hulking and highly capable bodyguards attached to Skeeve as a favor from the interdimensional Mafia's Fairy Godfather, Don Bruce. Nunzio seldom talks, while Guido speaks in a Runyonesque dialect, which is explained as being an aftereffect of having been in a production of Guys and Dolls. Both are much more intelligent than their stereotype suggests.
- Chumley, an enormous but quite gentle and erudite Troll whose professional persona is a monosyllabic muscle-for-hire called Big Crunch.
- Gus, a Gargoyle bartender who has a deadly pet salamander only he can handle.
- Bunny, Don Bruce's beautiful niece and Skeeve's assigned moll; she is an accomplished and intelligent accountant and is in love with Skeeve (though he does not know it).
- Markie, a small doll-like girl who is actually a character assassin in disguise. Cupys (small, doll-like people) are from the Cupid dimension.

The Phil Foglio comics based on the books also involve The Winslow: A small fuzzy alligator which happens to be utterly indestructible and presumably immortal, and figures prominently one way or another into fully three-fourths of the galaxy's known religions.

== Known dimensions ==
Many of the names, like so much else in this series, are puns; see the parenthetical comments.

- Klah: Backwater dimension from which Skeeve hails. General populace (Klahds) are afraid of demons and magik. Kingdom of Possiltum and Twixt are the only places worth mentioning. ("clod", slang for "stupid person".)
- Deva: Merchant capital of the dimensions. Inhabited by the Deveels, traders supreme. As Aahz puts it, "if you think you've gotten a good deal from a Deveel, first count your fingers, then your limbs, then your relatives". The Bazaar at Deva is the only place of interest, a dimension-wide round-the-clock flea market which sells every conceivable magikal device and artifact. ("Devil")
- Perv: High-tech dimension where Magik and technology are equal. Pervish cooking is one of the worst smells in all the dimensions (besides Gleep's breath). Pervects are short-tempered and disquieting rumors circulate about them, which Pervects encourage so that people do not visit. Do not ever call them "Perverts". They prefer to be called "Pervects".
- Limbo: Dark dimension filled with vampires and were-things, such as werewolves, werebears, weresnakes, and weretigers. Chief city is Blut, notable people are Vilhelm the Dispatcher, and Drahcir and Idnew: the Woof Writers, a husband and wife team of werewolves (homages to Wendy and Richard Pini). The low amount of force-lines limit magik here, and offworlders are viewed as terrifying monsters by the older vampires. Skeeve's house in the Bazaar has a back door which opens into Limbo. (Blood, Limbo)
- Jahk: Humanoid dimension where the average inhabitants are either short and obese or extremely thin. Every year, the Big Game is played to determine whether Veygus or Ta-Hoe is the capital of the dimension. Players are practically another species, extremely muscled and large. The winner of the Big Game used to claim the Trophy, but the hideous thing is now in the possession of Aahz, after the Skeeve-founded team "The Demons" won it in a three-way brawl. Following their victory and subsequent confiscation of the Trophy (and with it Jahk's method of selecting their capital) a Common Council was put together to rule the dimension. ("Jock", "Vegas", "Tahoe")
- Avis: Dimension full of sentient birds. No areas of interest. Do not visit Avis unless you can fly and you like foods of the crawly variety. (Latin for "bird". Tanda also makes references to Rentals, which mystifies Skeeve, this comes from the Avis Rent a Car System.)
- Gastropo: A dimension full of snail-like inhabitants. The preferred mode of transport is walking, although that takes hours just to move a block. Inadvisable to visit. As Tananda would put it, they have no cargo but plenty of es-cargo(t). (In biological categorization, snails are gastropods. "Escargot" is French for "snail"; the "t" is silent, so it rhymes with "cargo".)
- Arcadia: A pleasant dimension "controlled" by a hard-working "philanthropist" named Hoos. Apparently populated by people that he's bailed out of tight situations, it's implied that behind the scenes Hoos was largely responsible for putting them in the situations they were so grateful for having been rescued from. (Arcadia, a poetic byword for an idyllic vision of unspoiled wilderness.)
- Kow-Tow: An extremely remote dimension that superficially resembles the American "Wild West", but is actually a breeding ground for humans so that the vampire cows can suck their blood. Contains a huge nexus of magic force-lines.
- Scamaroni: A dimension with a smell-oriented race that has a reputation for being made up of suckers. ("Scam" = con game.)
- Kobol: A dimension of technology enthusiasts. ("COBOL", and possibly also "kobold".)
- Ronko: A dimension filled with televisions and advertising. ("Ronco")
- Wuh: Rural dimension that is home to cowardly, sheep-like shopaholics called Wuhses. ("Wuss".)
- Sear: A bleak desert dimension inhabited by tiny soil-dwelling critters. ("Sear", "sere")
- Ori: A dimension whose inhabitants resemble house cats.
- Walt: The natives look a bit like a mix between storks and ostriches, and are famous for their dancing prowess. ("waltz")
- Febrile: Coolest temperature is over 120 °F. ("Febrile"= "feverish")
- Molder: A dark, damp place where everything always seems to be changing. Even the ground seems to grow and move under your feet. ("Molder")
- Etc.: One long, straight road with identical buildings on both sides. Inhabited by creatures that look and dress identical. Gray suits, gray hair, gray face, two arms. All move at the identical time and in the same direction.
- Bumppp: Wide meadow filled with thick plants and orange flowers. blue sky and pink mountains. Inhabited by large snake creatures that appear to be hostile.
- Mall: Its where the Bill collectors came from, and where Skeeve apparently ran up 350,000 gold pieces in debt. Myth-Taken Identity
- Ghord: From "Myth-Fortunes" (Gordian Knot)

Dimensions that have been mentioned but not explicitly depicted:

- Imper: Not much is known about Imper except that it is close to Deva and the Imps were wiped out financially by the Deveels. The Imps have since tried to mimic the Deveels (whom they physically resemble) with only marginal success. The kindest thing anyone has said about Imps is that they are snappy dressers. ("Imp")
- Trollia: Chumley and Tanda's home dimension. The males are Trolls, and the females are Trollops. ("Troll", "trollop")
- Rinasp: A dimension that suffered a ghastly fate when Tanda was hired to go there on a collection job. (Apparently a syllable-swap of "Asprin".)
- Archiah: The dimension that "invented archery".
- Zoorik: Home of the Gnomes, who are implied to be financial wizards. ("Gnomes of Zürich", pronounced /ˈzʊrɪk/ in English.)
- Ratislava: Whose rat inhabitants created an extremely powerful magical device that was then stolen and taken off-dimension. (The name, at least, comes from Bratislava, Slovakia.)
- Mantico: Home of the formidable Manticore race.
- Djinger: Home and base of operations for the Djinns. The Djinns, like the Imps, were hit hard by the cut-throat tactics of the Deveels, so they started providing emigrant magickal labor in bottles and lamps. Males are Djinns, females are Djeanies. ("Djinn", "genie", I Dream of Jeannie, probably also "ginger")
- Trofi: A dimension that has no businessmen, instead, everything is won in contests. It is also the dimension known for matchmaking. Many dimension travelers want a Trofi wife. ("Trophy", "trophy wife")
- Cupid: Home of small doll-like people. They appear as young Klahds, when they are actually fully grown.
- Caf: A dimension of Gorgon-ish creatures with living hair that brew the best coffee in all the known dimensions.
- Mini: Home to the tiny, diminutive Minikins.
- Tue: Home to the small, four armed Tues. Known for tiny professional wrestlers called Terrible Tues, a dance troup called the Tue Tours, and their secretarial work; Tue Fingered Typists.

== Books ==
The "first" Myth Adventures series was written by Asprin alone for the now-defunct publishing house The Donning Company under their Starblaze Graphics imprint (with the last two published by Meisha Merlin, who picked up the contract from Donning). All twelve are collected in Robert Asprin's Myth Adventures Volume 1 and Volume 2 (Meisha Merlin, 2006/2007).

- Another Fine Myth (1978) ISBN 0-441-02359-2
- Myth Conceptions (1980) ISBN 0-441-55519-5
- Myth Directions (1982) ISBN 0-441-55525-X
- Myth-Ion Improbable (2001; takes place sequentially as Book 3.5) ISBN 1-892065-54-1
- Hit or Myth (1983) ISBN 0-441-33850-X
- Myth-ing Persons (1984) ISBN 0-441-55276-5
- Little Myth Marker (1985) ISBN 0-441-48499-9
- M.Y.T.H. Inc. Link (1986) ISBN 0-441-55277-3
- Myth-Nomers and Im-Pervections (1987) ISBN 0-441-01461-5
- M.Y.T.H. Inc. in Action (1990) ISBN 0-09-993500-7
- Sweet Myth-Tery of Life (1993) ISBN 0-441-00194-7
- Something M.Y.T.H. Inc. (2002) ISBN 0-441-01083-0

The "new" Myth Adventures series was co-authored with Jody Lynn Nye.

- Myth-Told Tales (2003) ISBN 1-59222-001-0
- Myth Alliances (2003) ISBN 1-59222-008-8
- Myth-Taken Identity (2004) ISBN 1-59222-030-4
- Class Dis-Mythed (2005) ISBN 1-59222-091-6
- Myth-Gotten Gains (2006) ISBN 1-59222-104-1
- Myth-Chief (2008) ISBN 0-8095-7278-8
- Myth-Fortunes (2008) ISBN 0-8095-7333-4

Nye has continued the series after Asprin's death in 2008.

- Myth-Quoted (2013; advertised as "Robert Asprin's Myth-Quoted", but authored by Nye alone.) ISBN 0-425-25701-0
- Myth-Fits (2016; advertised as "Robert Asprin's Myth-Fits", but authored by Nye alone.) ISBN 0-425-25702-9

After Myth-Gotten Gains, Meisha Merlin went out of business and publication of hardcover/trade editions changed hands again, this time to Wildside Press. Robert Asprin died in May 2008, but Nye intended that year to write the books which she and Asprin had planned ("We had big plans"). According to the series website, the publisher of mass market editions Ace Books has commissioned two.

=== Short stories ===
In 2010, Baen Books published a collection of Asprin's short myth-stories under the title Myth-Interpretations (ISBN 1-4391-3390-5). This collection contains short stories and short novels taking place in many worlds that Robert Asprin created. It is advertised as containing all of the Myth short fiction.

== Comic books ==
The first novel was adapted into an eight-part WaRP Graphics comic book series in the mid-1980s. Illustrated and heavily rewritten by Phil Foglio, the series was later collected into two full-color graphic novels published by Starblaze Graphics, and in 2007 Airship Entertainment (the Foglios' publishing concern) reprinted the material in a single volume. Four more issues followed, featuring an original story by Asprin and artist Jim Valentino which attempts to bridge the action between the first and second novels in the series. (Apple Comics took over the second series halfway through.) In 2010, Airship Entertainment began re-releasing the story as a web comic. Though this has been offline since sometime in February 2016, along with webcomic republications of Buck Godot and What's New with Phil & Dixie, when Airship Entertainment's old website broke down.

The second novel was later adapted into another eight-part comic series by Ken and Beth Mitchroney and published by Apple from 1987 through 1989. Neither of these two later series enjoyed a graphic novel collection.

Foglio has also done the cover art and accompanying illustrations for the first editions of most of the novels. Before he started the cover illustrations, Kelly Freas did the covers of the first editions of the earliest books of the series.

== Film and theater ==
Short-lived rumors circulated in the 1980s that Wendy and Richard Pini, owners of WaRP Graphics, were considering turning their adaptation of Another Fine Myth into a feature-length movie after doing so with their own property, Elfquest, though the latter has yet to even make it past concept to this day.

== The board game ==
A board game called Myth Fortunes was developed by Mayfair Games and sold in 1990.
