= Elizabeth McCoy =

Role-playing game designer

- Known for: writer and editor

Elizabeth "Archangel Beth" McCoy is a writer and editor in the role-playing game industry at Steve Jackson Games.

== Career ==
She and her husband Walter Milliken wrote the award-winning supplement GURPS Illuminati University. She was the line editor for the In Nomine role-playing game.

In a lawsuit that received national attention and led to the establishment of the Electronic Frontier Foundation, McCoy, Milliken and Steve Jackson successfully sued the United States Secret Service in 1993 for illegally seizing computers and electronic information.
