= Another Fine Myth =

1978 novel by Robert Asprin

- not First edition
- Author: Robert Asprin
- Illustrator: Polly and Kelly Freas
- Cover artist: Frank Kelly Freas
- Language: English
- Series: MythAdventures
- Genre: Fantasy
- Publisher: Starblaze Graphics
- Publication date: 1978
- Publication place: USA
- Media type: Print (Trade Paperback & Paperback)
- Pages: 159
- ISBN: 0-915442-54-X
- Followed by: Myth Conceptions

Another Fine Myth is a 1978 fantasy novel by American writer Robert Asprin, the first book in the Myth Adventures series.

== Plot synopsis ==
Skeeve, a magician's apprentice and wannabe thief from the dimension Klah, tries to learn the basics of magic from Master Magician Garkin for several months but to no avail. Skeeve can do little more than float a feather or light a candle using magic. Wanting to convince Skeeve that being a thief is not as good as being a magician, Garkin summons a demon. During the summoning an assassin barges into the hut, and Garkin and the assassin kill each other. Skeeve is left alone with the demon. To Skeeve's surprise the demon politely introduces himself as Aahz. Aahz explains that demon is slang for Dimension Traveler. He further explains that there are thousands of dimensions with different races in them, and that he is from the dimension of Perv, making Aahz a Pervect, while Skeeve is a Klahd. Aahz is a master magician like Garkin but loses his magical powers during the summoning ritual (due to a practical joke played on him by Garkin) and becomes stranded in Klah. Aahz volunteers to take Skeeve on as his apprentice and teach him magic.

The pair then embark on a series of misadventures as they try to evade more assassins trailing Skeeve. They decide to confront Isstvan, a dangerous Master Magician who plans to conquer all the other dimensions. Along the way they meet, and swindle, a demon hunter named Quigley. They encounter the assassins, and are saved by Skeeve's new magic. With information from the assassins they encounter Frumple, a merchant who transports them to the dimension of Deva (where the Deveels, master bargainers, live) so they can visit the Bazaar to find something to use against Isstvan.

On Deva, Aahz abandons Skeeve while he searches for a solution to their Isstvan problem. Skeeve gets into all kinds of trouble. First Skeeve bonds himself to the dragon Gleep; the infuriated dragon master forces Skeeve to purchase the dragon. Next Skeeve encounters Tananda, a Trollop from Trollia. She's strikingly beautiful and a former assassin and con artist working with a pack of ruffians to shake down tourists in the Bazaar. Skeeve is chosen as their next target; however, he doesn't get shaken down because Tananda and Aahz are old buddies. Aahz finds the solution to their Isstvan problem and the three of them, with the dragon Gleep, go back to Klah.

Back on Klah, Quigley, the demon hunter, joins their troupe. The five would-be heroes and the dragon Gleep and Quigley's war unicorn Buttercup confront Isstvan and defeat him by tricking him into consuming wine that destroys his magical ability. The defeated Isstvan and his allies leave Klah using a D-Hopper, a device that allows the user(s) to hop between dimensions. Tananda and Quigley leave too. Skeeve and Aahz remain at the Inn, and Aahz begins teaching his new apprentice more of the mastery of Magic.

== Reception ==
Richard A. Lupoff described the novel as "a madcap, lightweight, flippant, fast-paced chase fantasy with a fresh marvel in every chapter. . . . Clever, amusing, trivial".

Greg Costikyan reviewed Another Fine Myth in Ares Magazine #1. Costikyan commented that "Another Fine Myth (that's a pun) is a fast-moving fantasy story in the tradition of De Camp [...] Another Fine Myth is extremely funny and thoroughly enjoyable."

Lynn Bryant reviewed Another Fine Myth in Space Gamer/Fantasy Gamer No. 79. Bryant commented that "Highly recommended for anyone who has a sense of humor, or needs to develop one."
