= Myth Conceptions =

1981 novel by Robert Lynn Asprin

Myth Conceptions is a fantasy novel by American writer Robert Lynn Asprin published in 1981.

== Plot summary ==
Myth Conceptions is a novel in which the apprentice wizard Skeeve serves a demon from Perv and they are hired to function as court wizards who must defeat an enormous army.

== Reception ==
Greg Costikyan reviewed Myth Conceptions in Ares Magazine #8 and commented that "the field of humorous science fiction has too long been without a steady practitioner. Asprin fills the gap admirably, and it is to be hoped that he will continue in the same rich vein."

== Reviews ==
- Review by Tom Staicar (1982) in Amazing Science Fiction Stories, September 1982
- Review by Don D'Ammassa (1993) in Science Fiction Chronicle, #166 September 1993
