= Girl Genius =

Comic book and webcomic series

- Agatha, main character of Girl Genius
- Author(s): Phil & Kaja Foglio
- Illustrator(s): Phil & Kaja Foglio
- Website: www.girlgeniusonline.com
- Current status/schedule: Updates on Mondays, Wednesdays, Fridays.
- Launch date: January 2001 (Secret Blueprints, Vol. I preview issue); February 21, 2005 (web publication)
- Genre(s): Fantasy, humor, science fiction, steampunk, gaslamp fantasy

Girl Genius is an ongoing science fiction comic book series turned webcomic, written and drawn by Phil and Kaja Foglio and published by their company Studio Foglio LLC under the imprint Airship Entertainment. Its principle color artist is Cheyenne Wright. The comic won the Hugo Award for Best Graphic Story three times, has been nominated for a Hugo Award for Best Professional Artist and twice for Eisner Awards, and won multiple WCCA awards.

Girl Genius has the tagline of "Adventure, Romance, Mad Science!". It follows the main character Agatha Heterodyne (introduced in 1995) through an alternate-history Victorian-style "steampunk" setting, although elements veer from what is usually thought of as steampunk. Kaja Foglio describes it as "gaslamp fantasy" instead to suggest its more fantastic style.

As well as the comics, the Foglios have also written four Girl Genius novels, all published by Night Shade Books, and two games based on the world have been made.

== Overview ==
=== Setting ===
The setting has been described as steampunk, with reviewers for Wired describing it as a "mosh of Victorian era, magic and emerging technology" and "steampunk to the core", but co-creator Kaja Foglio dislikes the term and instead coined the term "gaslamp fantasy" to describe the work. Kaja said in a blog post that when Girl Genius was first coming out, there was a comic called Steampunk and she wanted to avoid confusion. She added that "we have no punk, and we have more than just steam, [so] using a different name seemed appropriate." Girl Genius differs from classic steampunk in that technology is not just limited to machines but also encompasses biology such as "constructs" – biological creations which range from Frankenstein-style creatures to talking cats and mouse-sized mammoths.

Girl Genius is set in an alternate-universe Europe with Industrial Revolution-like surroundings, airships, and mad scientists called Sparks. These Sparks, who have incredible powers of invention, turned the Age of Enlightenment into a full-scale war that ravaged the continent, until Baron Wulfenbach brought an uneasy peace through force.

=== Plot ===
Girl Genius tells the story of Agatha Clay, a student and apprentice at Transylvania Polygnostic University, whose experiments never work until she encounters an electromagnetic pulse and is robbed of her locket. This leads her to break free of an attempt to suppress her powers as a Spark and to hide that she is the long-lost daughter of legendary figures William "Bill" Heterodyne and Lucrezia Mongfish, and thus is the last of the prestigious and dreaded House of Heterodyne. Agatha Heterodyne learns to mix scientific genius, a streak of heroism, and an obsessive possessiveness for what she considers her own in order to claim her heritage and birthright while trying to remain safe from the many European powers trying to use her for their own ends.

== Major characters ==
The main and recurring characters of Girl Genius include:

- Agatha Heterodyne: She was raised under the name of Agatha Clay and was kept ignorant of her true identity growing up. It is when her locket is stolen that Agatha "breaks through" as a Spark, leading her to learn that she is the last of the Heterodyne family. She spends the story trying to reclaim her family heritage and defend it from the many threats to its safety.
- The Heterodyne Boys: Two legendary brothers and heroes, Bill and Barry Heterodyne, who are Agatha's father and uncle respectively. Bill's wife Lucrezia Mongfish went missing one day, prompting the Heterodyne Boys to fight in a war from which they became missing in action.
- The Other: A malevolent, enigmatic entity who almost destroyed Europa twenty years before the story's start, and whom the Heterodyne Boys went missing when going off to fight. Over the course of the story, Agatha comes to believe that the Other was Lucrezia Mongfish, her long-lost mother.
- Baron Klaus Wulfenbach: A pan-European leader. Klaus was once a sidekick of the Heterodyne Boys, but when they disappeared, he chose to bring peace to Europe through force. He suspects Agatha Heterodyne to be the Other.
- Gilgamesh "Gil" Wulfenbach: The only son of Klaus Wulfenbach, who is raising him as a successor, and one of Agatha's love interests. He is torn between his loyalty to his father and his love for Agatha.
- Tarvek Sturmvoraus: A prince from Sturmhalten, who is the direct descendant of the legendary 17th century "Storm King" Andronicus Valois. Though only introduced in Volume 6 (after it moved to webcomic format), Tarvek later became one of Agatha's love interests.
- The Jägermonsters or Jägers: A type of super-soldiers serving House Heterodyne.
- Zeetha: A lost warrior-princess from a faraway land known as Skifander. She volunteers to mentor Agatha.
- Krosp: An artificially-made cat with human intelligence and one of Agatha's sidekicks.
- Othar Tryggvassen: A self-styled "Gentleman Adventurer" and a Spark who seeks to kill all the Sparks in the world, ending with himself.

== Publication history ==
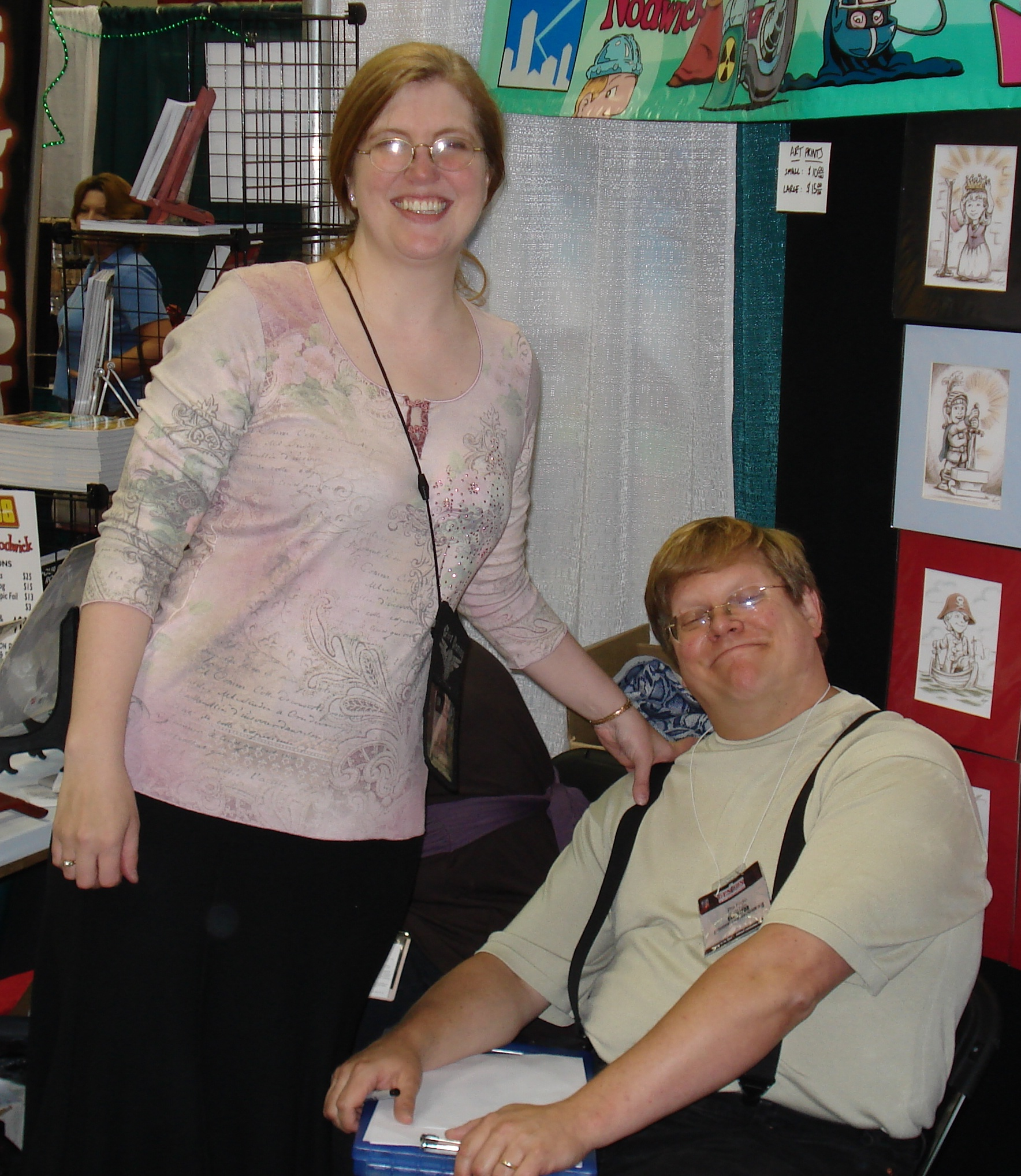
Kaja and Phil Foglio in 2007

The idea for the style of Girl Genius came about when Kaja Foglio went through some of Phil's loose drawings, saying in an interview: "I was going through all of Phil's old files and I was filing all of the old sketches, and I was coming across weird airships and cats in tophats with walking canes, and all of this wonderful... Victoriana sci-fi stuff... it was like 'Oh, this is everything I love!'" Phil Foglio said, "We wanted to do something with a strong female lead character. We both like the tropes associated with mad science, and I really enjoy drawing fiddly Victorian-style gizmos".

Agatha Heterodyne first appeared in print in 1995 in a GURPS sourcebook that the Foglios illustrated. Phil Foglio states that plotting for Girl Genius started in 1993, and it was first published in 2000. Girl Genius: The Secret Blueprints Vol. I was printed in January 2001, followed closely by the monochrome Issue 1 in February. In 2005 Girl Genius became a webcomic, and quarterly print publication of the comic ceased.

The first three printed issues (which make up Volume 1) were in black and white. Subsequent printed and web comics were in color. Volume 1 was inked by Brian Snoddy, Volumes 2 and 3 by Mark McNabb. Volume 4 by Laurie E. Smith, and all subsequent volumes by Cheyenne Wright. Wright also colored the comics of Volume 1; these colored versions were used for a new print edition of Volume 1 and have replaced the original comics on the website.

In an interview recorded in January 2008, shortly before they began releasing pages of volume 8 of Girl Genius on their web site, the Foglios stated that they expected the climax of Volume 8 to be the rough equivalent of "the end of the first season," and that it would provide a logical break in case of author catastrophe and a fresh jumping-on point for new readers. However, this was an underestimate of the length of the remaining "first season": the end of Volume 13 turned out to be approximately halfway through the planned overall story arc. The "second season" of the series began March 3, 2014, with "Act 2, Volume 1," (Note: "Girl Genius Comic for Monday, March 03, 2014". Livejournal. Girl Genius. March 2, 2014.) after a two-month hiatus of the main story.

=== Published collections ===
The webcomic, as well as the initial printed issues, have been collected into printed volumes, and in some cases those volumes have been collected into printed omnibuses. Unless stated in the notes below, the books reprint works first published as the webcomic.

==== The First Journey of Agatha Heterodyne (also called "Act 1") ====
Vol / Omnibus #	Title	Pages	ISBN	Notes
Volume 1	Agatha Heterodyne and the Beetleburg Clank	96	Paperback: ISBN 1-890856-19-3 Full color paperback: ISBN 1-890856-50-9 Hardcover: ISBN 1-890856-20-7	Reprints issues #1–3
Volume 2	Agatha Heterodyne and the Airship City	112	Paperback: ISBN 1-890856-30-4 Hardcover: ISBN 1-890856-31-2	Reprints issues #4–6
Volume 3	Agatha Heterodyne and the Monster Engine	128	Paperback: ISBN 1-890856-32-0 Hardcover: ISBN 1-890856-33-9	Reprints issues #7–10
Volume 4	Agatha Heterodyne and the Circus Of Dreams	128	Paperback: ISBN 1-890856-36-3 Hardcover: ISBN 1-890856-37-1	Reprints issues #11–13 and webcomic from April to June 2005
Volume 5	Agatha Heterodyne and the Clockwork Princess	112	Paperback: ISBN 1-890856-39-8 Hardcover: ISBN 1-890856-38-X	
Volume 6	Agatha Heterodyne and the Golden Trilobite	150	Paperback: ISBN 1-890856-42-8 Hardcover: ISBN 1-890856-41-X	
Volume 7	Agatha Heterodyne and the Voice of the Castle	128	Paperback: ISBN 978-1-890856-45-8 Hardcover: ISBN 978-1-890856-46-5	
Volume 8	Agatha Heterodyne and the Chapel of Bones	144	Paperback: ISBN 978-1-890856-47-2 Hardcover: ISBN 978-1-890856-48-9	
Volume 9	Agatha Heterodyne and the Heirs of the Storm	144	Paperback: ISBN 978-1-890856-52-6 Hardcover: ISBN 978-1-890856-51-9	
Volume 10	Agatha Heterodyne and the Guardian Muse	152	Paperback: ISBN 978-1-890856-53-3 Hardcover: ISBN 978-1-890856-54-0	
Volume 11	Agatha Heterodyne and the Hammerless Bell	168	Paperback: ISBN 978-1-890856-55-7 Hardcover: ISBN 978-1-890856-56-4	
Volume 12	Agatha Heterodyne and the Siege of Mechanicsburg	192	Paperback: ISBN 978-1-890856-57-1 Hardcover: ISBN 978-1-890856-58-8	
Volume 13	Agatha Heterodyne and the Sleeping City	160	Paperback: ISBN 978-1-890856-59-5 Hardcover: ISBN 978-1-890856-60-1	
Omnibus 1	Girl Genius Omnibus Edition Vol 1		Paperback: ISBN 978-1-890856-40-3	Reprints Volumes 1–3, in a smaller, black & white edition
Omnibus 1	Girl Genius Omnibus Vol 1: Agatha Awakens		Hardcover: ISBN 978-0-7653-3132-8	Reprints Volumes 1–3 in color and new lettering

==== The Second Journey of Agatha Heterodyne (also called "Act 2") ====
Vol / Omnibus #	Title	Pages	ISBN	Notes
Volume 14	The Beast of the Rails	128	Paperback: ISBN 978-1-890856-61-8 Hardcover: ISBN 978-1-890856-62-5	
Volume 15	City of Lightning	128	Paperback: ISBN 978-1-890856-63-2 Hardcover: ISBN 978-1-890856-64-9	
Volume 16	The Incorruptible Library	122	Paperback: ISBN 978-1-890856-65-6 Hardcover: ISBN 978-1-890856-66-3	
Volume 17	Kings and Wizards	120	Paperback: ISBN 978-1-890856-67-0 Hardcover: ISBN 978-1-890856-68-7	
Volume 18	Queens and Pirates	128	Paperback: ISBN 978-1890856-69-4 Hardcover: ISBN 978-1-890856-70-0	
Volume 19	Sparks and Monsters	128	Paperback: ISBN 978-1890856-71-7 Hardcover: ISBN 978-1890856-72-4	
Volume 20	The Exorcism Engines	122	Paperback: ISBN 978-1-890856-73-1 Hardcover: ISBN 978-1890856-74-8	
Volume 21	An Entertainment in Londinium	122		
Volume 22	The Chronometric Lantern Expedition	121		
Volume 23	Escape from the Island of the Rat Queen	120		

== Girl Genius in other media ==
Girl Genius has been adapted, or proposed for adaptation, for other media:

=== Novels ===
The Foglios have written four Girl Genius prose novels, which follow the same story as the comics:

- Agatha H. and the Airship City, covering volumes 1–3 of the comic;
- Agatha H. and the Clockwork Princess, covering volumes 4–6;
- Agatha H. and the Voice of the Castle, covering volumes 7–9; and
- Agatha H. and the Siege of Mechanicsburg covering volumes 10–13.

The prose novels are published by Night Shade Books in the US, and Titan Books in the UK.

=== Games ===
- Agatha Heterodyne appeared in two illustrations and by name in the 1995 role-playing game supplement GURPS Illuminati University. This sourcebook for GURPS was illustrated by the Foglios and predates the release of the comic.
- Girl Genius: The Works is a card game designed by Phil Foglio and James Ernest, published in 2001. This game was an adaptation of an earlier game involving the Foglios called XXXenophile.
- Girl Genius and the Rats of Mechanicsburg is a mobile game released in 2014 following a Kickstarter in 2012.
- A role-playing game, Girl Genius Sourcebook and Role-playing Game, was released in 2021 by Steve Jackson Games. A role-playing game had been first announced as early as 2004.
- A video game, Girl Genius: Adventures In Castle Heterodyne, was released in 2023 after a Kickstarter in 2020.

=== Movie ===
In 2010 it was reported that Felicia D. Henderson had optioned the rights to Girl Genius and was adapting it into a movie. However, as of 2025 no movie has been produced.

== Awards ==
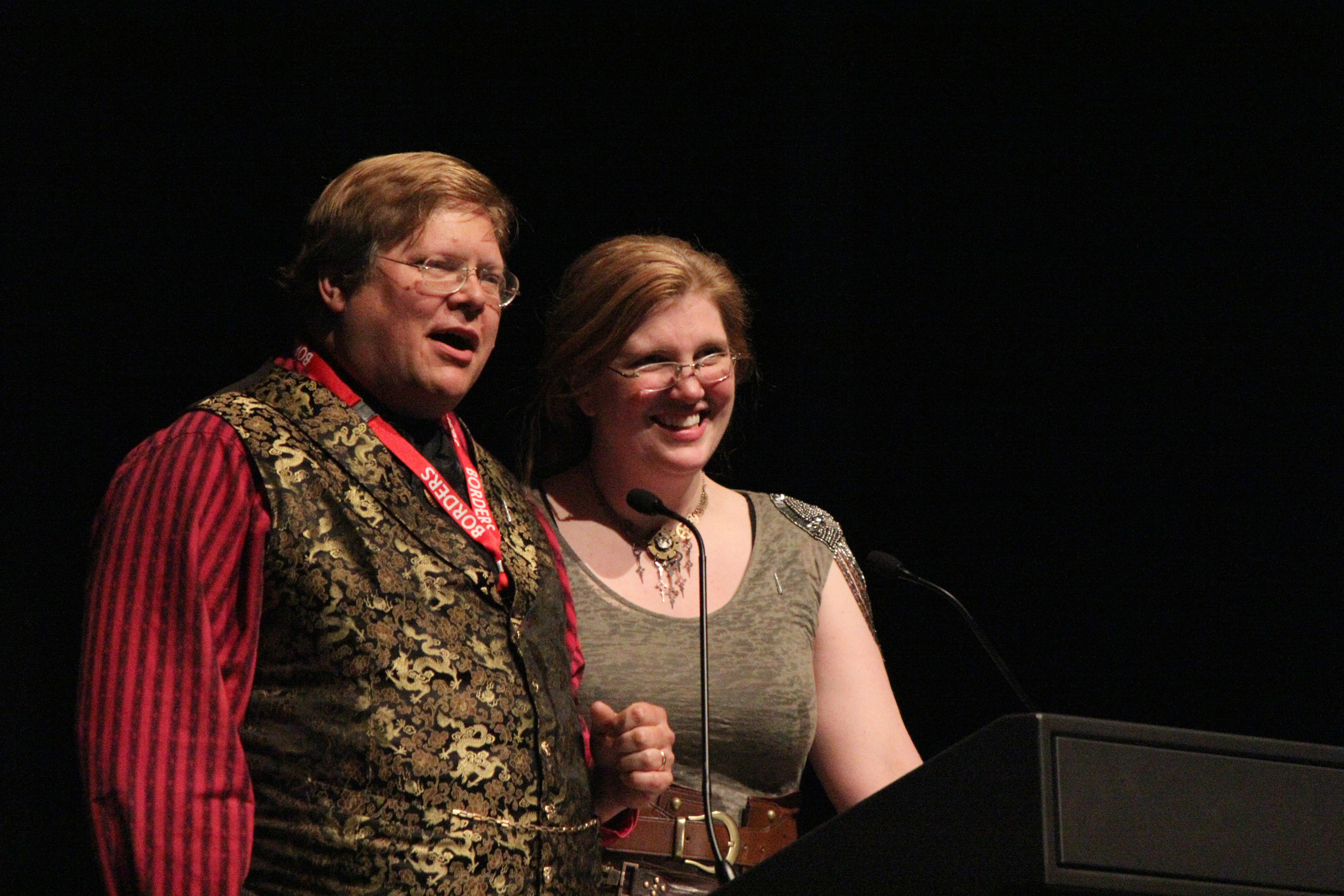
The Foglios' acceptance speech at the Hugo Awards ceremony in 2010

Girl Genius and its creators have won multiple Hugo Awards and Web Cartoonists' Choice Awards (WCCAs). They have also been nominated for further Hugo awards, WCCA awards, and Eisner Awards.

Year	Organization	Award	Recipient / Book	Outcome	Citation
2014	Hugo Awards	Best Graphic Story	Girl Genius, Volume 13: Agatha Heterodyne and the Sleeping City	Finalist	
2011	Hugo Awards	Best Graphic Story	Girl Genius, Volume 10: Agatha Heterodyne and the Guardian Muse	Won	
2010	Hugo Awards	Best Graphic Story	Girl Genius, Volume 9: Agatha Heterodyne and the Heirs of the Storm	Won	
2009	Hugo Awards	Best Graphic Story	Girl Genius, Volume 8: Agatha Heterodyne and the Chapel of Bones	Won	
2008	Hugo Awards	Best Professional Artist	Phil Foglio	Finalist	
2008	Web Cartoonists' Choice Awards	Outstanding Comic		Won	
2008	Web Cartoonists' Choice Awards	Outstanding Writer		Won	
2008	Web Cartoonists' Choice Awards	Outstanding Environment Design		Won	
2008	Web Cartoonists' Choice Awards	Outstanding Artist		Nominated	
2008	Web Cartoonists' Choice Awards	Outstanding Character Writing		Nominated	
2008	Web Cartoonists' Choice Awards	Outstanding Long Form Comic		Nominated	
2008	Web Cartoonists' Choice Awards	Outstanding Use of Color	Phil and Kaja Foglio (and Cheyenne Wright)	Nominated	
2007	Web Cartoonists' Choice Awards	Outstanding Science Fiction Comic		Won	
2007	Web Cartoonists' Choice Awards	Outstanding Comic		Nominated	
2007	Web Cartoonists' Choice Awards	Outstanding Long Form Comic		Nominated	
2007	Eisner Awards	Best Digital Comic		Nominated	
2006	Web Cartoonists' Choice Awards	Outstanding Story Concept		Won	
2006	Web Cartoonists' Choice Awards	Outstanding Comic		Nominated	
2006	Web Cartoonists' Choice Awards	Outstanding Science Fiction Comic		Nominated	
2005	Eisner Awards	Best Writer/Artist—Humor	Phil Foglio	Nominated	
