= Villanos =

Villanos may refer to:

- Villanos (band), an Argentinian band
- Villainous (TV series) (Spanish: Villanos), a Mexican animated series
- Los Villanos, a family of wrestlers (see Template:Villanos)

== See also ==
- Villainous (disambiguation)
