= Roller Coaster Hippo =

Board game

Roller Coaster Hippo is a board game published in 1988 by Ravensburger.

== Contents ==
Roller Coaster Hippo is a game in which progress is made in a race game by means of die rolls and through the player's ability to perform party-tricks.

== Reception ==
John Harrington reviewed Roller Coaster Hippo for Games International magazine, and gave it a rating of 8 out of 10, and stated that "despite some desperate attempts at wackiness with the hippo theme, I suspect the game lacks a strong enough hook to succeed. It should, however, go down well at Butlitz and other holiday camps."
