= Shogun (1976 board game) =

Strategy board game

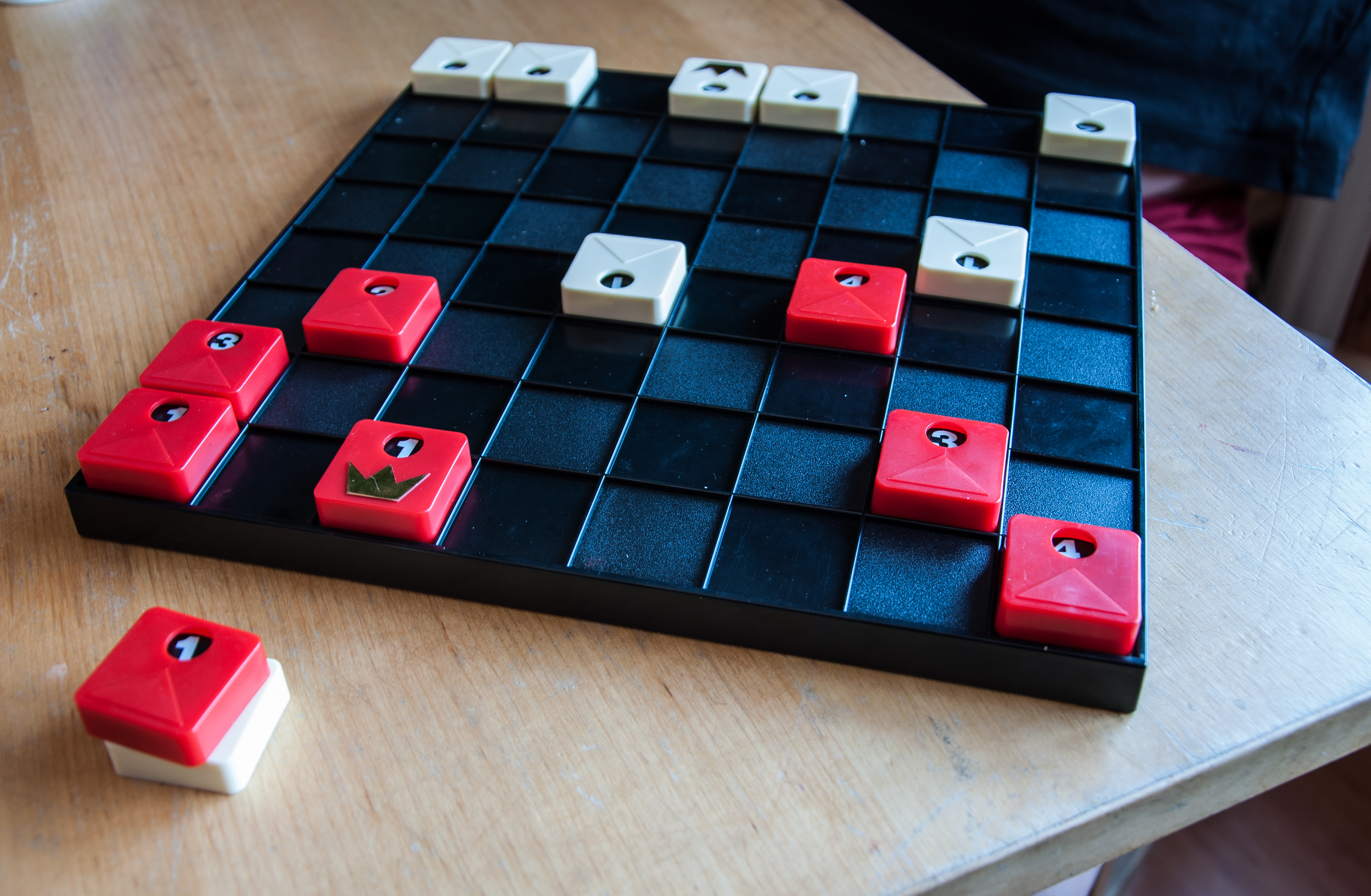
8×8 board

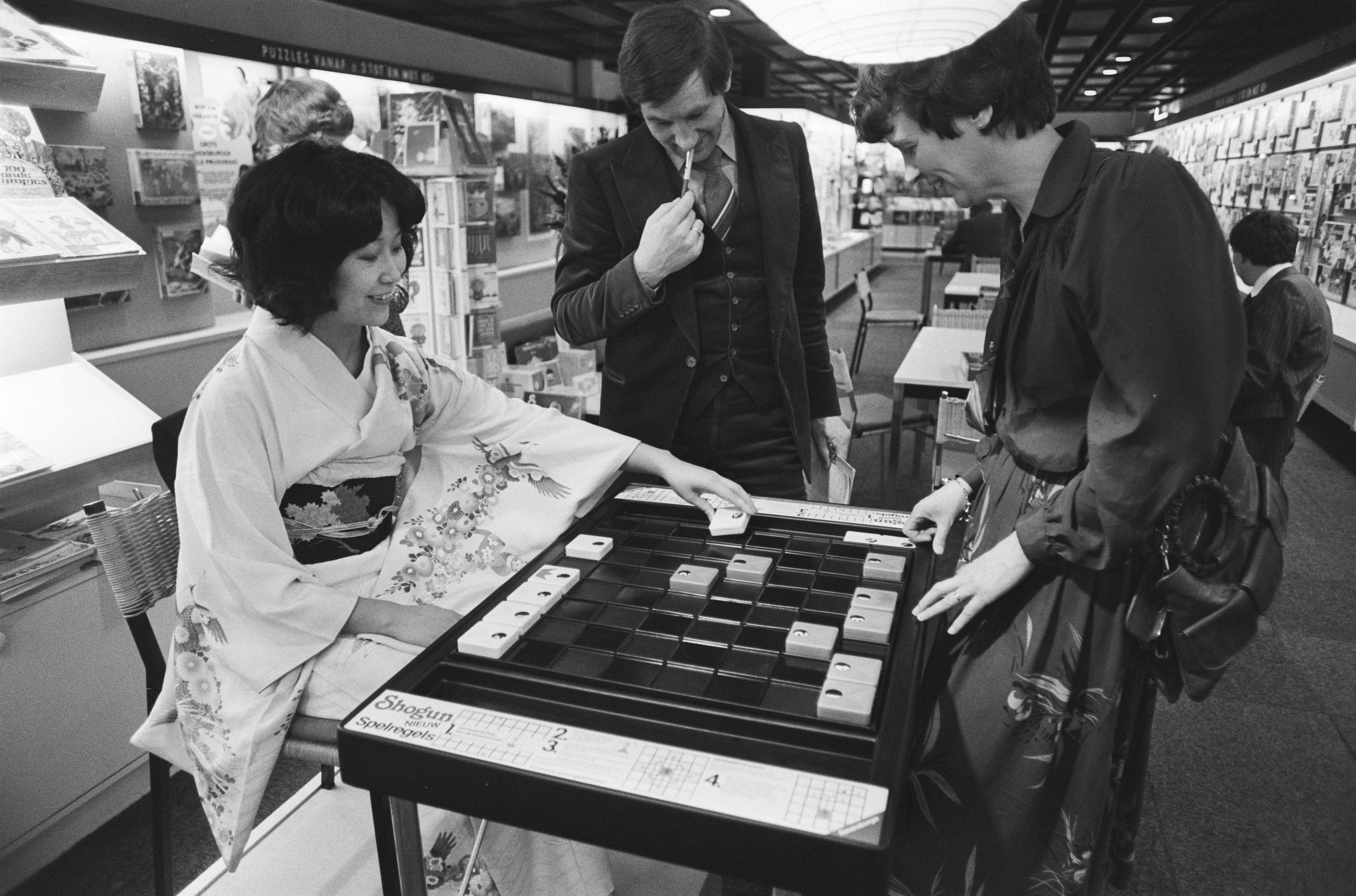
Game fair

Shogun is a board game published by Epoch Playthings in 1976 and by Ravensburger in 1979.

== Gameplay ==
Shogun is an abstract strategy game for two players.

== Reviews ==
- Games #4
- Jeux & Stratégie #1
