= Richard Ulrich (board game designer) =

German board game designer

Richard Ulrich (born 1942 in Stuttgart) is a German board game designer. Several of his games have been nominated for or have won the Spiel des Jahres, a German games award.

== Game designer ==
Ulrich started designing game in the mid-1980s. His first published game was the cooperative children's game Fischerspiel (Herder Spiele, 1987).

In the early 1990s, Ulrich submitted the design of a game involving flirting to Ravensburger. The game publisher liked the concept but not the game mechanics, and brought Ulrich together with Wolfgang Kramer. The result, published in 1993, was the matchmaker game Punk sucht Lady (Punk Seeks Lady). The game was successful, and Ulrich and Kramer immediately designed their most well-known collaboration, El Grande (1995), which won the Spiel des Jahres and the Deutscher Spiele Preis.

In 1998, another Ulrich/Kramer collaboration, El Caballero, was a Spiel des Jahres finalist.
