= Java (board game) =

Board game

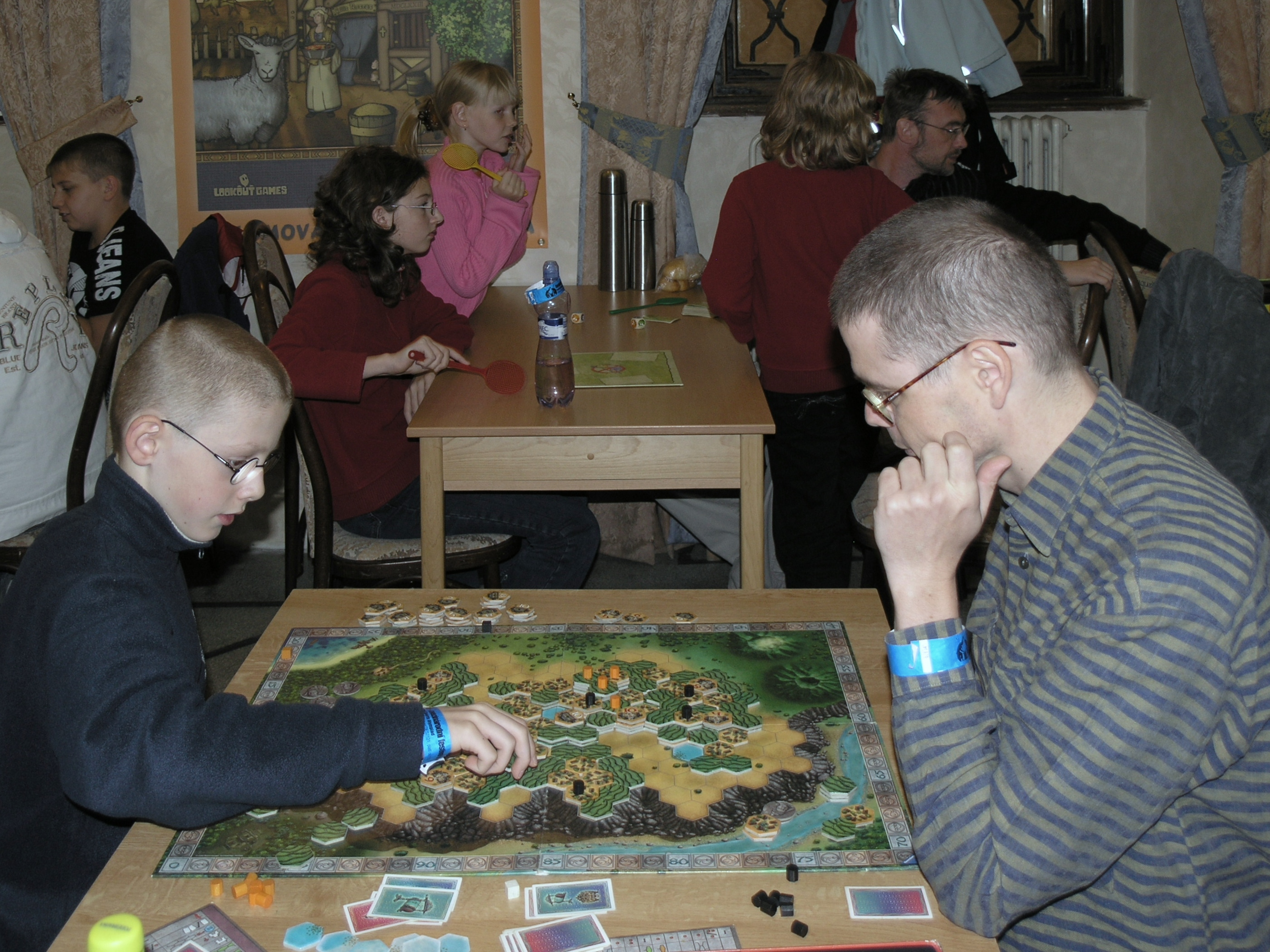
- Players: 2–4
- Setup time: 10 minutes
- Playing time: 90 minutes
- Age range: 12 +
- Skills: Strategic thought

Java is a German-style board game designed by Wolfgang Kramer and Michael Kiesling, illustrated by Franz Vohwinkel, and published in 2000 by Ravensburger in German and by Rio Grande Games in English. In the game, players build the island of Java to set up palace festivals and gain victory points. Upon its release, the game received several awards.

== Gameplay ==
The game provides the atmosphere of the island of Java on a hexagonal board. Players build the island and score by setting up palace festivals at opportune moments. When players run out of hexagons to build the island, the game is over. A final scoring phase now takes place and a winner is declared.

== Reception ==
Bernhard Fischer, reviewing from Spieletest, praised the game’s strategy and tactics. However, he criticised its poor appeal for intermediate players and complex rules. Java also placed 9th place in the 2001 Deutscher Spiele Preis award and the Games Magazine Best Advanced Strategy Game in 2002. It is the second game in the Mask Trilogy, following Tikal and followed by Mexica.

== Reviews ==
- Family Games: The 100 Best
