= Who's the Ass? =

Trick taking card game

- Designers: Wolfgang Kramer
- Publishers: Phalanx Games
- Players: 3–12
- Setup time: <5 minutes
- Playing time: 30 minutes
- Chance: Medium
- Age range: 8+
- Skills: Strategic thought

Who's the Ass? („Einer ist immer der Esel“ in German) is a trick-taking card game for 3–12 players. The game is played with a deck consisting of 104 cards numbered from 1 to 13 (8 cards of each rank), five jokers, and one ass card. The ass card is printed the same front and back, so all players know who has it in their hand.

== Rules ==
Each player is dealt a number of cards—usually 13, but fewer if there is a large number of players. The player who is dealt the ass leads the first trick.

=== Tricks ===
A player may lead one or more cards. If leading multiple cards, all must be the same rank. The other players, in turn, have an opportunity to play to the trick. Players must play the same number of cards led, and must play higher than the highest card played so far. For example, if a pair of eights is led, the next player may only play a pair of nines or higher. A player who cannot play, or who does not wish to play, may pass. After each player has played or passed once, the trick ends, and the player who played the highest cards leads the next trick. Cards played to the trick are taken out of the game.

=== Ass rounds ===
A player may lead the ass card, in which case the trick will be an "ass round". Unlike a normal trick, players are not allowed to pass, and must play exactly one card from their hand. There are no restrictions on which card may be played. After every player has played a card, the player who played the highest card takes all cards played, including the ass, and puts them into their hand. In the case of a tie, the last card played is considered highest. This player then leads the next trick, but may not lead the ass immediately after an ass round.

=== Jokers ===
A joker may substitute for any other card; for example two sevens and a joker can play as three sevens. If played as a single card, it has a value of 14. If played during an ass round, the player may choose any value from 1 to 14 for the joker.

=== Scoring ===
If, at the end of a trick, one or more players is out of cards, the round ends. Points are scored according to the cards left in a player's hand. Numbered cards are worth their value in points, between 1 and 13. Jokers are worth 14 points. The ass is worth 20 points.

=== End of the game ===
The game is normally played to a certain number of points, such as 200. The player with the lowest score wins.

== Strategy ==
- By holding onto low cards, players can avoid being forced to take the ass.
- It may be beneficial to "win" an ass round, depending on the other cards played during the trick.
