= Villainous =

Villainous may refer to:

- Villainous (TV series), a Mexican animated series
- Villainous, a card game by Ravensburger, based on Disney villains

== See also ==
- Villain (disambiguation)
