= ASS Altenburger =

German gaming industry trademark

Coordinates: 50°59′45″N 12°26′51″E

Spielkartenfabrik Altenburg GmbH
- Company type: GmbH
- Industry: Gaming industry
- Founded: 1765
- Headquarters: Altenburg, Germany
- Key people: Stefan Luther
- Number of employees: 160
- Website: spielkarten.com

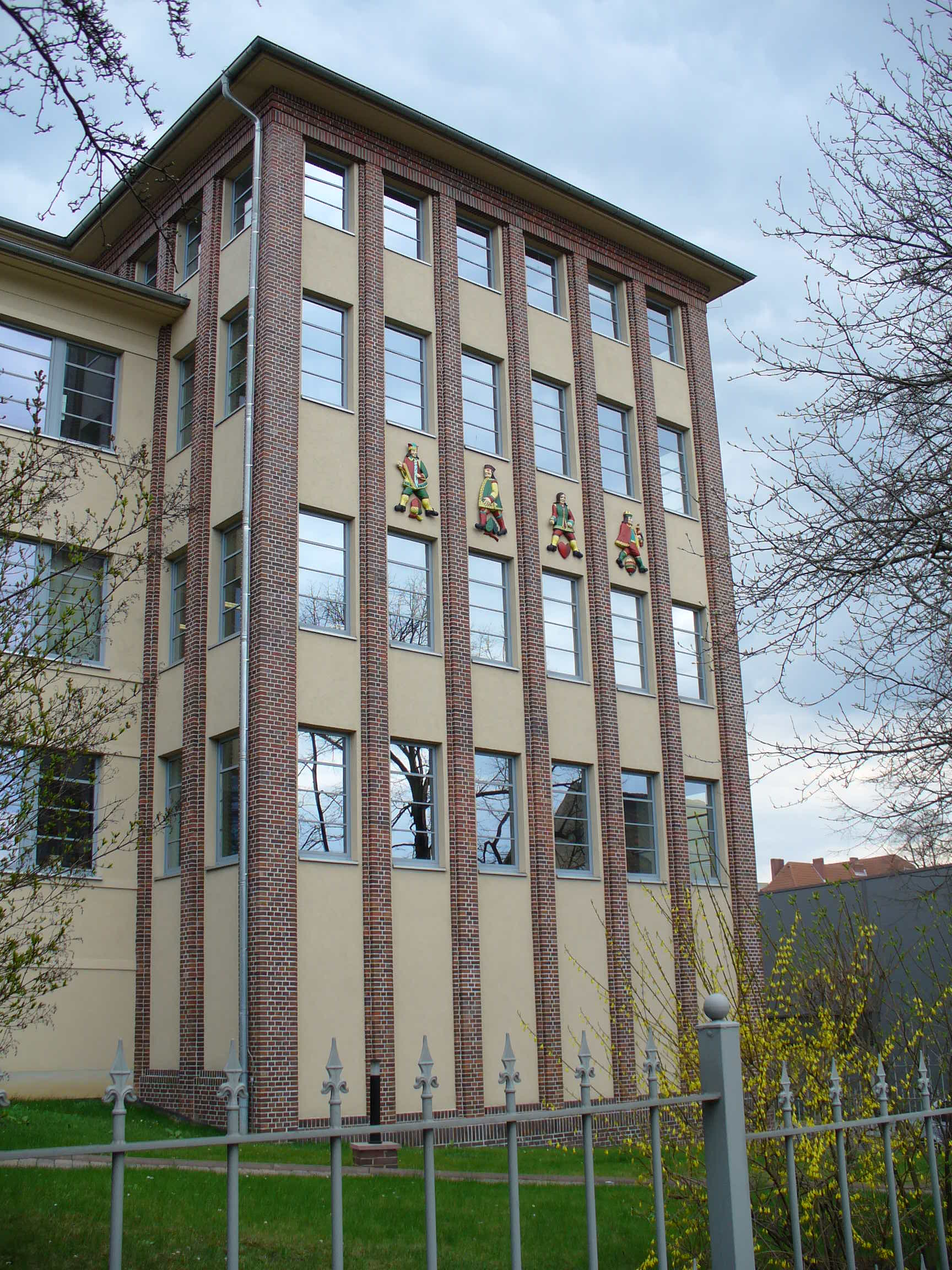
The playing card factory in Altenburg

ASS Altenburger is since 2003 the trademark of the German playing card manufacturer Spielkartenfabrik Altenburg, based in the town of Altenburg. The firm is owned by Cartamundi, of Turnhout, Belgium. ASS (Altenburger und Stralsunder Spielkartenfabrik) claims to be the market leader in Germany for playing cards. Every year almost 40 million packs of cards of many different types are manufactured in Altenburg.

== History ==
The history of ASS Altenburger begins at two locations in Germany: Stralsund on the Baltic Sea and in Altenburg in Thuringia.

=== Stralsund's playing card factories ===
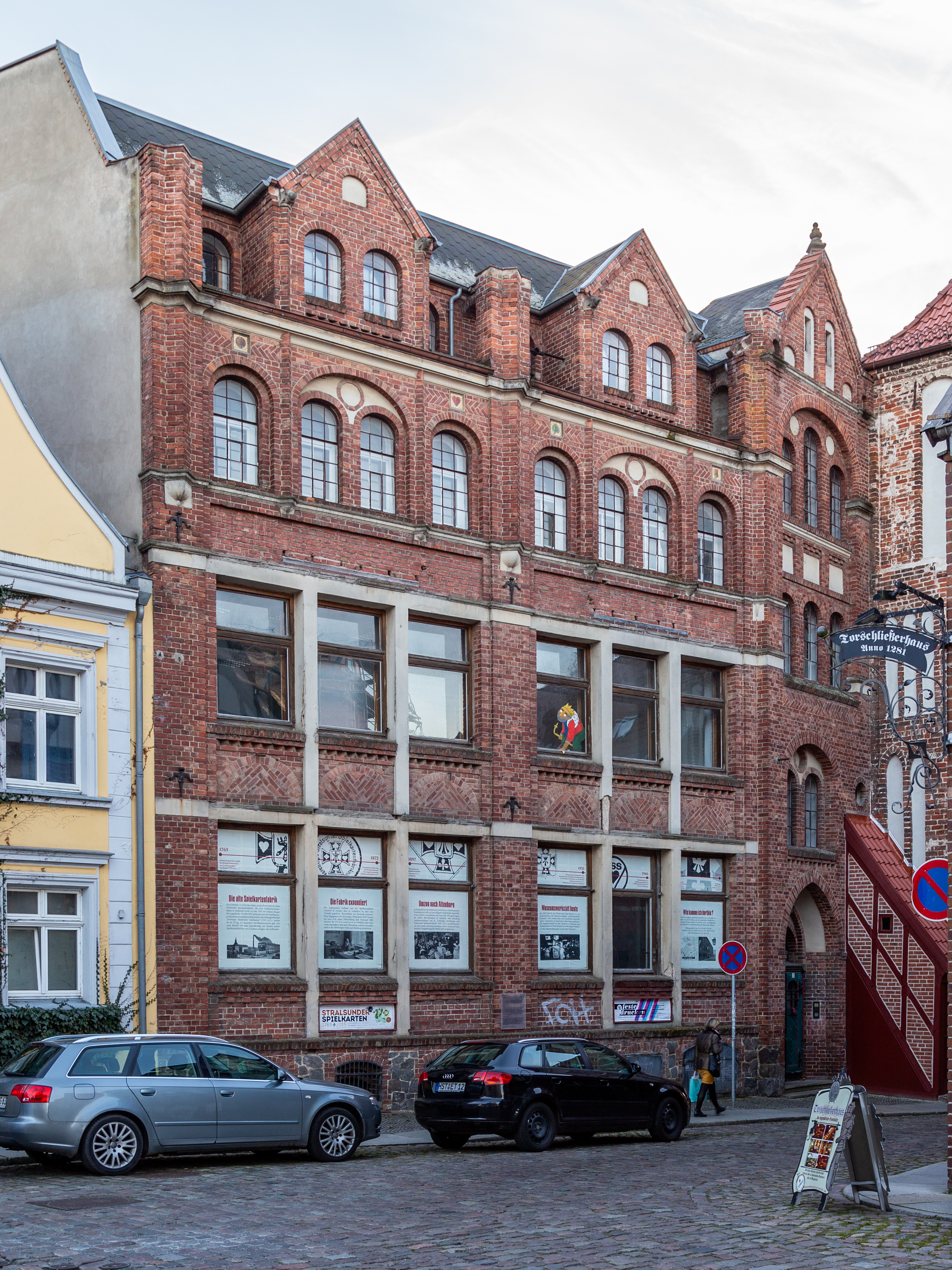
Former Stralsund playing card factory at the Kütertor, Heilgeiststraße 2/3, in Stralsund

In 1765 Johann Kaspar Kern founded a playing card manufacturers in Stralsund. In 1793 it was taken over by Georg Friedrich Schlüter and, in 1823, passed to the von der Osten family with whom it remained for decades. In 1823 Ernst Joachim von der Osten took over the firm; he was followed in 1845 by Ludwig von der Osten, in 1859 by Carl Ludwig von Zansen and, in 1859, G. Mie, who also belonged to the von der Osten family. In 1846 Ludwig Heidborn founded a playing card factory which produced cards until 1848 and then again, after a long break, from 1857. In 1848, another playing card factory in Stralsund was started by Gustav Friedrich Diekelmann. This was led from 1850 by Eugen Diekelmann, from 1855 by Theodor Wegener and from 1863 by Fritz Wegener.

The firm of Ludwig von der Osten (owned by G. Mie) was merged on 1 October 1872 with the other two Stralsund companies of Ludwig Heidborn and Theodor Wegener (owned by Fritz Wegener) to form the United Stralsund Playing Card Company or Vereinigten Stralsunder Spielkarten-Fabriken Aktien-Gesellschaft Stralsund (VSS). Its office was in the house at Knieperwall 1a which had belonged to Heidborn. Production was carried out in the buildings formerly owned by the von der Ostens and Wegeners. With the acquisition of the playing card house of Lennhoff & Heuser in Frankfurt in 1882 the VSS acquired several very popular card patterns, which contributed to their subsequently success. In 1883 the former owner of this factory moved to Stralsund and became the managing director of VSS.

The company grew steadily: in 1888 the Stralsund firm of Falkenberg & Co. (founded 1872) was bought up, in 1891 the company of Tiedemann in Rostock, in 1894 the Berlin playing card manufacturers of Rochus Sala, in 1895 the Hallesche factory, Ludwig & Schmidt, in 1897 the Altenburger Spielkartenfabrik, in 1901 Sutor from Naumburg (Saale), in 1905 Booch in Werdau and 1907 the Berlin concern of Büttner & Cie. Still other factories were bought and integrated into the Stralsund company. In 1891/1892 production switched to a cheaper printing process. With that, the old VSS card patterns, with their rich tradition, disappeared. One that survives today, albeit erroneously known as the Berlin pattern (Berliner Bild), is a Stralsund schema with French suits, the Finest German Stralsund pattern or Feinste Deutsche Stralsunder.

The Stralsund factories manufactured the majority of playing cards sold on the German market but also produced them for export. In 1907 Stralsund made 3,340,000 playing cards and, in 1913, they employed 235 workers.

The following card patterns were produced: Bavarian pattern, Stralsund type, Bavarian pattern, Munich type, Bongout pattern, Darmstadt double pattern (1872 to 1931), Finest German Stralsund pattern (1855 to 1892, also called the Berlin pattern), Frankfurt pattern (from 1882), Franconian pattern (from 1885), French pattern and double pattern, Prussian pattern (from 1840), Renaissance pattern (from 1882), Rhenish pattern (from c. 1920), Rokoko pattern (from 1913), Royal pattern, Saxon pattern (1882 to 1931), special patterns with German suit signs, Tarock pattern with French suits, Württemberg double pattern (1882 to 1908). The Stralsund Museum houses examples of many of the playing cards made, some very rare, displayed in a permanent exhibition.

The Stralsund firm soon had a problem with its factory site and original headquarters in Stralsund: the offices and production premises were too small and the character and limited space of the fortress town of Stralsund stood in the way of any expansion. The town of Altenburg, however, had geographical and logistical advantages.

=== Altenburger Spielkartenfabrik ===
On 16 November 1832, the brothers Bernhard and Otto Bechstein, in the residential town of the Duchy of Saxe-Altenburg, had been granted permission to manufacture German and French playing cards in the name of the Duchy and the Ducal Saxon Altenburg Playing Card Company (Herzogliche Sächsische Altenburger Concessionierte Spielkartenfabrik) was founded. It operated for many years with great energy, but no profit due to tough competition from passing traders from Weimar, Leipzig and Dresden. In 1836, the Bechsteins asked for the sale of these 'foreign' cards to be banned and, in 1840, they made their first profit. That was a watershed and the firm now became known for the quality and value of its products. In 1874, Bernhard Bechstein sold the company to businessman, Theodor Gutmann. In 1886, Artur Pleißner and Richard Kühne turned it into a public limited company which lasted until 1891/92. From 1892 to 1897, the firm went back into the private ownership of one Carl Schneider, before being taken over in 1897 by the VSS. Until 1931, the Altenburg production site went under the name of the Altenburg division of the United Stralsund Playing Card Company, formerly Schneider & Co. (Vereinigte Stralsunder Spielkartenfabrik AG Abt. Altenburg vormals Schneider & Co.) In 1931 the factory in Stralsund were close and the company offices moved to the more centrally-situated Altenburg.

=== Merger ===
At the shareholder's meeting on 14 February 1931 it was decided to merge the premises in Stralsund and Altenburg and to move the firm to Thuringia. The company was renamed to the United Altenburg and Stralsund Playing Card Company (Vereinigte Altenburger und Stralsunder Spielkarten-Fabriken, A.G., Altenburg) usually known as ASS or V.A.S.S.. That same year the company moved its head office from Stralsund to Altenburg. Production at Stralsund ceased in September 1931.

=== Postwar division ===
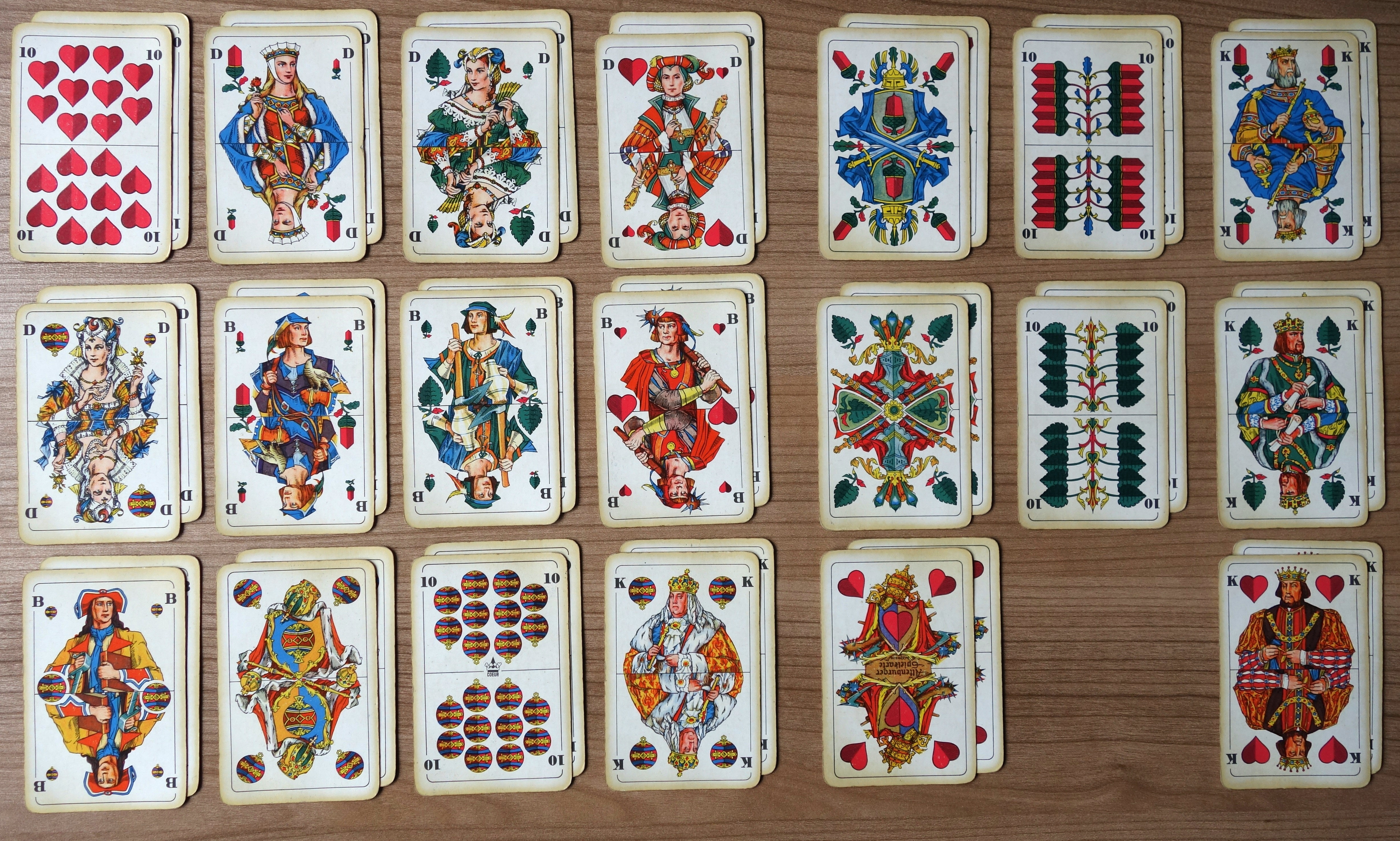
German-suited deck Doppelkopf 206, made in GDR (without blanks)

After the Second World War the company was divided for more than 40 years: The ASS was expropriated and dismantled in 1946 and the company re-established by former shareholders in Mannheim, then moved to Leinfelden in 1956. In 1972 it bought Bielefelder Spielkarten, along with its playing card collection, from E. Gundlach, taking over its entire range, with the exception of marketing playing cards, in 1981.

In Altenburg itself, operations resumed on 3 May 1946. The playing-card factory was part of a state-owned business in the state of Thuringia. Eleven years later it became the Volkseigener Betrieb of Altenburg Playing Card Company (Altenburger Spielkartenfabrik, Altenburg Thüringen). Its trademark and logo was Cœur (a heart symbol).

=== Takeovers ===
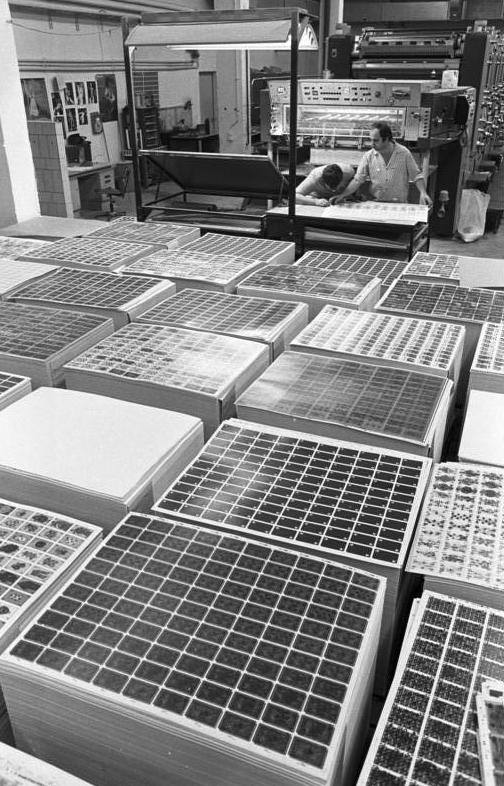
Playing card manufacture in Altenburg in January 1990

After the Wende the Altenburg firm was re-privatised in 1991 under the name of Altenburg Playing Card Company (Altenburger Spielkartenfabrik) and sold by the Treuhand to the United Munich Playing Card Company (Vereinigte Münchener Spielkartenfabriken) of F.X. Schmid. In 1996 the playing card range of F. X. Schmid was integrated into the production at Altenburg; F. X. Schmid was taken over by Ravensburger, the largest European game and puzzle manufacturers. That year, ASS lost a name dispute with the United Altenburger and Stralsund Playing Card Company (Vereinigte Altenburger und Stralsunder Spielkartenfabriken) in Leinfelden. It was forced to rename itself and chose the name Spielkartenfabrik Altenburg. Some time afterwards the Leinfelder concern went bankrupt and went, as ASS Spielkarten, to the Berliner Blatz-Group (Schmidt Spiele). Its head office moved to Steinenbronn on 1 October 1996.

In 1999 Ravensburger took over Berliner Spielkarten. Altenburg even produced cards for this subsidiary. In 2000, the brand of Berliner Spielkarten was integrated, along with its additional product fields of games and puzzles, into ASS. The site at Altenburg was developed into one of the most important production sites for playing cards of all types in Europe.

=== ASS Altenburger Spielkarten ===
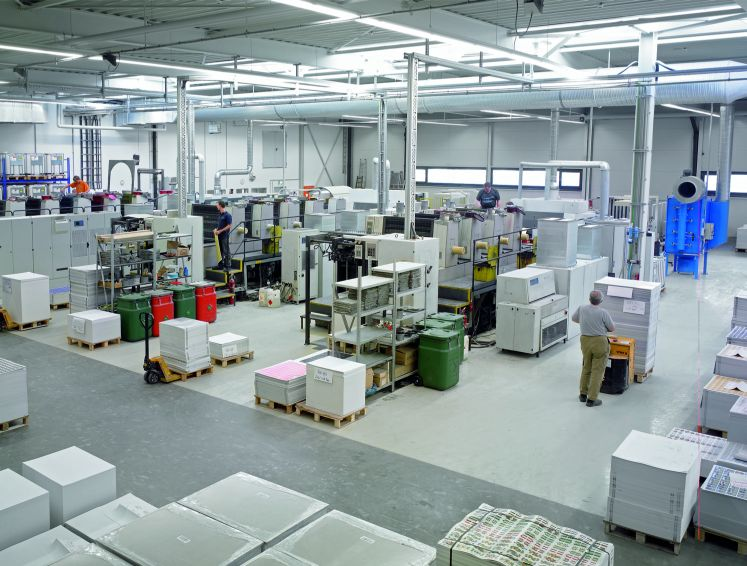
Printing room in 2013

In 2002 the international playing card manufacturers, Cartamundi, who had taken over the ASS Spielkartenverlag in Steinenbronn the year before, acquired Spielkartenfabrik Altenburg from the Ravensburger Group. The two firms, which had been separated since 1946 due to the post-war situation in Germany were reunited in a business association. In 2003 the two brands, "ASS" and "Altenburger" were merged to form the new brand of "ASS Altenburger". Production in Steinenbronn was moved to Altenburg. There was now heavy investment in the production and storage capacity. In 2005 the factory site at Altenburg was greatly expanded with a new building on a plot given up by the old district hospital.

Several German playing cards dating to 1509 and made by Altenburger cardmaker, Merten (Martin) Hockendorf, have survived. For this reason, the town and its cardmakers jointly celebrated "500 Years of Altenburg Playing Cards" in 2009.

On 1 May 2011, the insolvent game manufacturer, Scheer Spiele from Marktheidenfeld, was taken over. The production of Scheer Spiele was then relocated to Altenburg. This enabled ASS Altenburger to also produce game plans, large boxes and punched parts for parlour games.

As of 2017, the company produces almost 40 million different card decks per year in Altenburg according to its own figures.

== Summary of firms merged into or acquired by ASS Altenburger ==
Predecessor cardmakers in Stralsund included:

- Johann Kaspar Kern, Stralsund, 1765–1793
- Georg Friedich Schlüter, Stralsund, 1793–1823
- von der Osten family, Stralsund, 1823–1872
- Ludwig Heidborn, Stralsund, 1846–1848 and 1857–1872
- Diekelmann family, Stralsund, 1848–1855
- Wegener family, Stralsund, – 1848–1872

Predecessor cardmakers in Altenburg included:

- Herzogliche Sächsische Altenburger Concessionierte Spielkartenfabrik, Altenburg, 1832–1874
- Theodor Gutmann, Altenburg, 1874–1886
- Pleißner & Kühne, Altenburg, 1886–1892
- Schneider & Co., Altenburg, 1892–1897

The Stralsund predecessors were merged into the firm of:

- Vereinigten Stralsunder Spielkarten-Fabriken Aktien-Gesellschaft Stralsund (VSS), Stralsund, 1872–1931.

VSS then acquired:

- Lennhoff & Heuser, Frankfurt – 1882
- Falkenberg & Co., Stralsund – 1888
- Tiedemann, Rostock – 1891
- Rochus Sala, Berlin – 1894
- Ludwig & Schmidt, Halle – 1895
- Altenburger Spielkartenfabrik (Schneider & Co.), Altenburg – 1897
- Sutor, Naumburg (Saale) – 1901
- Booch, Werdau – 1905
- Büttner & Cie., Berlin – 1907

In 1931, the Stralsund factory closed and the whole operation converged on Altenburg. The company was renamed:

- Vereinigte Altenburger und Stralsunder Spielkarten-Fabriken (ASS or VASS), Altenburg, 1931–1946

It made the following acquisition:

- B. Dondorf, Frankfurt – 1933

After the Second World War, the firm divided into:

- Altenburg operation
  - VASS/ASS, Altenburg, 1946–1956
  - Altenburger Spielkartenfabrik, Altenburg Thüringen, Altenburg, 1956–1991
  - Altenburger Spielkartenfabrik, Altenburg, sold to F.X. Schmid in 1991, taken over by Ravensburger in 1996
  - Altenburger Spielkartenfabrik (under Ravensburger), 1996–2003
- West German operation
  - Vereinigte Altenburger und Stralsunder Spielkartenfabriken (VASS), Mannheim, 1946–1956
  - Bielefelder Spielkarten, Bielefeld - acquired 1972
  - VASS, Leinfelden, 1956–1996, bankrupted 1996 and acquired by Schmidt-Spiele
  - ASS Spielkarten, Steinenbronn, 1996–2001, bought by Cartamundi
  - ASS Spielkarten, Steinenbronn, 2001–2003

ASS and Altenburger merge into ASS Altenburger in 2003 as subsidiary of Cartamundi. All production concentrated at Altenburg.
