= Cash (card game) =

Cash is a card game published in 1990 by Ravensburger.

== Contents ==
Cash is a game in which seven different cards representing safes each require a particular combination of four keys to open the safe.

== Reception ==
Brian Walker reviewed Cash for Games International magazine, and gave it a rating of 7 out of 10, and stated that "Cash? That will do nicely, thank you."
