= Malefiz =

Board game

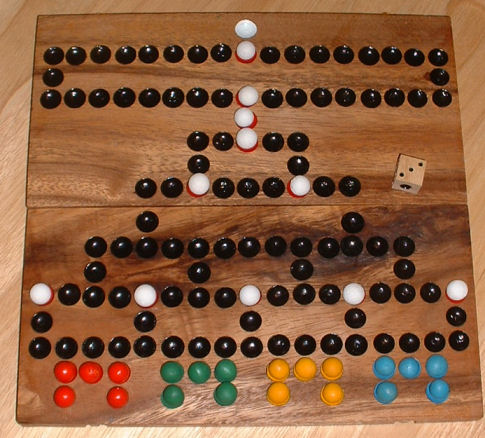
- Malefiz board and starting setup, using coloured marbles as pawns, white marbles as barricades
- Designers: Werner Schöppner
- Publishers: Ravensburger
- Years active: 1960 to present
- Genres: Board game Dice game
- Players: 2–4
- Setup time: 1–3 minutes
- Playing time: ~30 minutes
- Chance: Medium (dice rolling)
- Age range: 6 and up
- Skills: Strategy, tactics, counting
- Synonyms: Barricade

Malefiz (also known as Barricade) is a strategy board game, invented by Werner Schöppner and published by Ravensburger since 1960. It is a non-circular descendant of the ancient Indian board game Pachisi.

== Etymology ==
The name of the game borrows the obsolete German word Malefiz, meaning "misdeed" or "bad action". The word was derived from the Latin word maleficus, meaning "mischievous" or "profane".

== Setup ==
Malefiz requires the following items:

- 1 gameboard
- 20 pawns (5 in each of 4 player colours)
- 11 barricade pieces
- 1 6-sided die

At the outset, each player's pawns are placed in their respective five-space houses, typically located along the bottom of the board. Barricade pieces are placed in each of eleven specially marked spaces on the board.

A radial version of the Malefiz board

== Gameplay ==
First play may be determined by a die-roll or another manner of the players' choosing.

At the beginning of each turn, the active player rolls the die. That player selects one of her five pawns and moves it a number of steps equal to the number shown on the die. That pawn may begin traveling in any direction and may turn to continue through corners in the path, but it may not double-back along its course, and it may not forgo any steps. The spaces within the players' houses are not counted against the die-roll; the first space counted by any pawn is the space immediately above the house.

During the course of a move, a pawn may pass other pawns (regardless of colour) with no effect. In the event that a pawn finishes its move by landing on a space occupied by another pawn, the pawn occupying that space is captured. Captured pawns are returned to their respective houses and become available to rejoin play upon their owner's next turn.

Unlike pawns, barricade pieces may not be passed. In order for play to progress past a barricade, the barricade must be captured by a pawn. A player who captures a barricade must relocate the barrier to an unoccupied space on the board. Barricades may not be placed in the four houses or in any of the 17 spaces in the bottom-most row.

A pawn may not be moved if doing so would cause it either to pass a barricade or to overshoot the uppermost space on the board.

After the move is complete, play passes to the next player.

A player may forgo her move if and only if none of her pawns may be moved.

=== Win condition ===
The first player to land a pawn in the uppermost space is the winner.
