= German Playing Card Museum =

Museum in Baden-Württemberg, Germany

Coordinates: 48.69015°N 9.13848°E

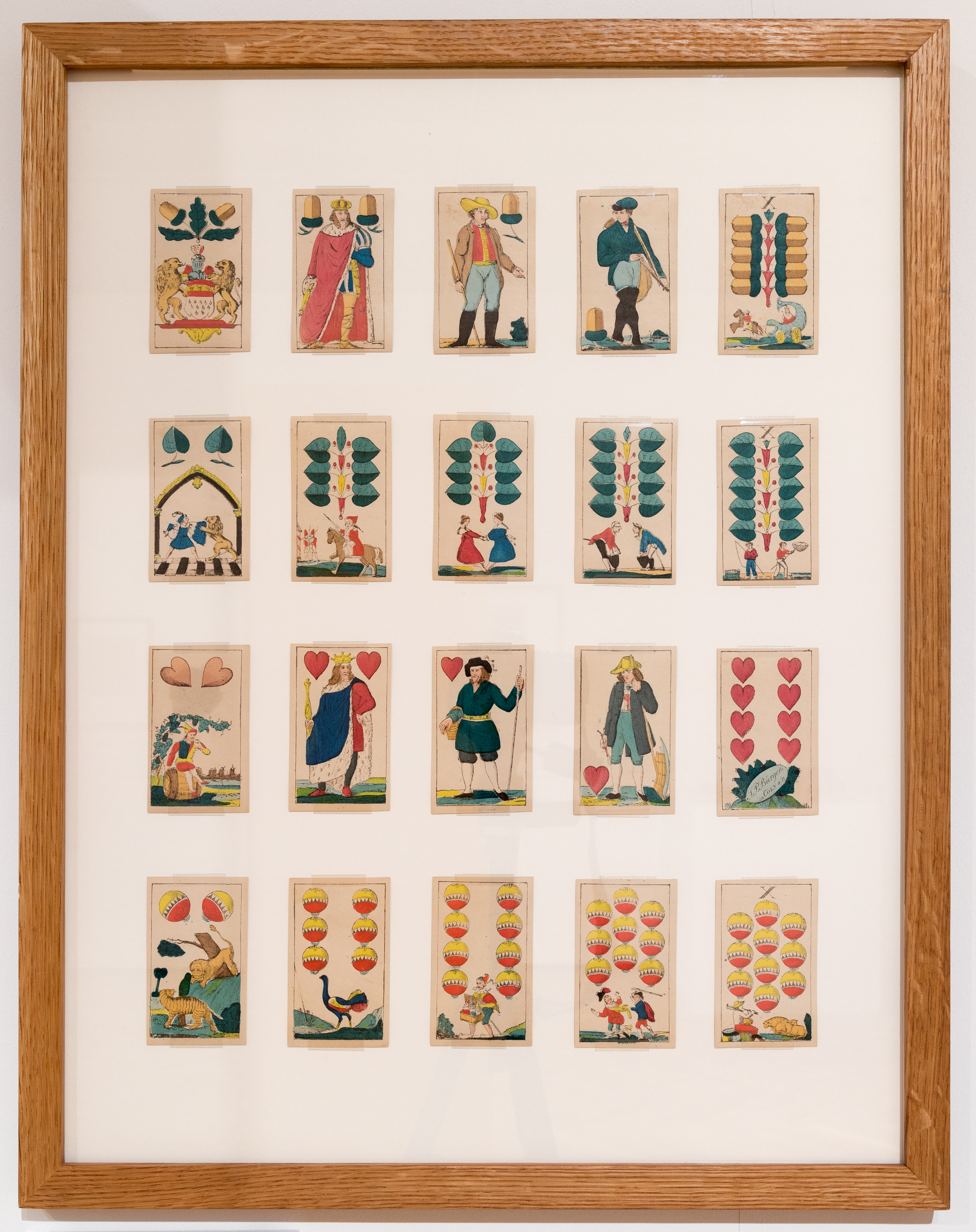
Images of Cologne on German playing cards made by Johann Peter Bürger in Cologne, c. 1850

The German Playing Card Museum (German: Deutsches Spielkartenmuseum) in Leinfelden-Echterdingen is a branch of the Württemberg State Museum and houses one of the largest public playing cards collections in Europe. It is open to all ludologists and those with private interests. Playing cards are systematically collected, archived and researched. The collection includes around 15,000 decks with over 500,000 individual cards, a games library with an archive, a graphics collection, as well as arts and crafts objects, card presses, glasses, gaming tables, etc. One rarity is its Asian-Indian collection. It is considered the most comprehensive museum of its type in the world. The museum is a member of the International Playing Card Society.

== History ==
The history of the playing card museum began in 1923 in Altenburg in Thuringia. On the initiative of Julius Benndorf, editor of the Altenburger Skatkalender (pseudonym Benno Dirf), and with the help of Carl Schneider, director of the United Stralsund Playing Card Manufacturers (later ASS), a one-room playing card museum called the Skatheimat (home of Skat), was added to the local history museum in Altenburg Castle, founded four years earlier by Albrecht von der Gabelentz. By 1939, 6000 different packs of cards had been collected. In 1946, during the dismantling of the ASS playing card factory by the Soviet Military Administration in Thuringia, the museum's collection was also removed; its whereabouts are unclear.

The expropriated company of ASS, which was relocated to West Germany after the Second World War, first to Mannheim, then 1956 to Leinfelden, built up a collection there in a new company museum, the ASS Museum. ASS continued to acquire other playing card manufacturers, some of which had more or less large company archives, but also private collections that exclusively benefited the museum:

- Dr. Martin von Hase Collection, 1950
- Franz Ritter von Hauslab Collection, 1955

In 1972, ASS also took over the German Playing Card Museum with Bielefelder Spielkarten in Bielefeld, which had also acquired several important collections:

- Dr. Werner Jakstein Collection, 1952
- Richard Kaselowsky Collection, 1955
- Rudolf von Leyden Collection, 1956

The museum in Leinfelden was given the name of the new acquisition. In 1974, the German Playing Card Museum was opened on the site of today's Schönbuchschule. On 18 August 1982, the Museum was sold to the state of Baden-Württemberg and the city of Leinfelden-Echterdingen due to the increasingly narrow financial margin at ASS. Leinfelden-Echterdingen became sponsors of the museum, which also became a branch of the Württemberg State Museum. In 1983, a friends association was formed.

The town of Leinfelden-Echterdingen closed the exhibition on 30 June 2012 and converted the museum into an archive that can be viewed by appointment. The reason was that the museum was running at a loss. Exhibitions are put on in the municipal museum of Leinfelden-Echterdingen.
