= New York, New York (game) =

Board game

New York, New York is a board game published in 1989 by F.X. Schmid.

== Contents ==
New York, New York is a game in which players build the New York City skyline using rectangular tiles with numbers on them.

== Reception ==
Brian Walker reviewed New York, New York for Games International magazine, and gave it 4 stars out of 5, and stated that "If you're a card player, buy this game. If you're not a card player, still buy this game. New York, New York. They were right."
