= Karawane (board game) =

Board game

Karawane is a board game published in 1990 by Ravensburger.

== Contents ==
Karawane is a camel-themed racing board game.

== Reception ==
Brian Walker reviewed Karawane for Games International magazine, awarding it a rating of 4 out of 10. Walker criticized the game's pricing and presentation, stating: "If the game had arrived in a small box with a matching board and retailed for about a tenner then no one would have complained. Instead, it is presented as Ravensburger's 'adult' game and makes the adjective 'ostentatious' seem wholly inadequate."

== Reviews ==
- Jeux & Stratégie nouvelle formule #6 (as "Caravane")
