= Bielefelder Spielkarten =

German playing card manufacturer

- Industry: Playing card manufacture
- Headquarters: Bielefeld, Germany

Bielefelder Spielkarten was a mid-20th century, German manufacturer of playing cards based in Bielefeld, Germany.

== History ==
The firm was founded in Bielefeld 1950 as a subsidiary of E. Gundlach, its first games bearing the parent company's name. In 1972 the company was sold, along with its playing card collection, to ASS and, initially, continued to produce the same range. In 1981, ASS took over the entire range and Bielefelder then only produced playing cards with advertising. In 1996, ASS went bankrupt and that also saw the demise of Bielefelder Spielkarten.

Their logo was a red heart on a white background with the word "JOKER" in a scroll emblazoned on it.
