= Dondorf =

German playing card company

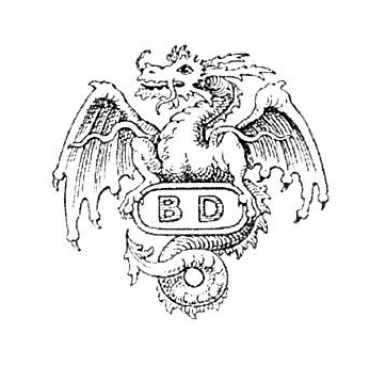
Logo of B. Dondorf

Dondorf or B. Dondorf was a luxury playing card company, founded in Frankfurt (German Confederation) in 1833, that produced playing cards for 100 years.

== History ==
The cardmakers were founded in April 1833 by Bernard J. Dondorf (1809–?) who came from a Jewish immigrant family in Frankfurt. He worked for the printers C. Naumann before opening his own business in 1833. Initially this sold equipment for the printing industry as well as stationery and visiting cards, printing using lithographic printing techniques. As chromolithography took off, Dondorf diversified into the playing card business around 1840. Opening a new factory in 1871, Dondorf retired in July 1872, handing the business over to his sons, Carl and Paul, and his son in law, Jacob Fries.

Fries departed in 1890 and founder Bernhard Dondorf died in 1902 at the age of 94. In 1906, the firm become a limited liability company, largely in the possession of the Dondorfs. Dondorf had a considerable export market, printing bank notes for Italy and Japan. In the years running up to the First World War, they were the principal, almost the only, maker of playing cards for Denmark, Norway and Sweden.

The war resulted in irrecoverable losses and Germany then hit a period of hyperinflation which decimated the business. In 1929, the firm was sold to Flemming and Wiskott who continued selling cards under the Dondorf name. In 1933, they were bought out by VASS who, however, ceased production of Dondorf's lines. With the rise of Nazism and the consequent oppression of Jews, the family scattered abroad.
