= Maloney's Inheritance =

Sid Sackson board game

Maloney's Inheritance, originally published in Germany as Das Erbe des Maloney, is a board game published in 1988 by Otto Maier Verlag (now Ravensburger) that is a remake of the 1973 game Holiday!

== Description ==
The premise of the game is Maloney has died, but his vast inheritance will go to the person who can win a competition. Maloney's Inheritance is a game for 3–6 players in which each player tries to accumulate the most points by the end of the game, thus earning the right to be the heir to Maloney's fortune.

=== Setup ===
The board shows a map of the United States with 16 cities connected by various highways, and a track showing the seven days of the week. A marker is placed on Sunday, the first day of the week, and a "suitcase" card is placed facedown on each city. Each suitcase will award up to 5 points or up to $1500, or will penalize up 3 points or $1000. Each player is given 12 action cards; each action card lists one city, and the number of points that will be awarded on each day of the week. The rest of the action cards are placed facedown on the table. Each player also receives a joker and money. The limousine token is placed on a randomly determined city.

=== Gameplay ===
The first action each turn is have an auction for the right to drive the limousine, and thus choose its destination. The winner of the auction announces which city is the destination and all the players are driven there. When the limousine arrives at the city, the driver redeems an action card for the points awarded on that particular day. In addition, the driver also turns over the suitcase card for that city, and is awarded or penalized the number of points or money indicated. Other players may choose to (but do not have to) also redeem an action card for that particular city, also receiving points for the day of the week. This ends the turn. The day marker is moved one day, and the play returns to the limousine auction for the next turn.

Some days are more valuable than others; on Tuesdays and Fridays, redeeming action cards results in double points.

There is no auction on Sunday. Instead, the first card on the action card deck is turned over, and the limousine delivers everyone to that city.

Once per game, a player can use their joker card to automatically win the limousine auction.

=== Choosing a destination ===
The driver of the limousine cannot automatically go to any city on the map. Instead, the limousine can go to any city only one move from its current location. For example, Nashville is connected via various highways to six other cities.

=== Victory conditions ===
The game continues until either one player reaches 69 points, or one player runs out of action cards. At the end of the game, each player receives an additional point for each $1000 they have left. The player with the most points is the winner.

== Publication history ==
In 1966, Ruth Shaler created a game titled Go and See. In 1973, American game designer Sid Sackson revised Shaler's game with her permission; the new game was titled Jet Holiday during development, but was retitled Holiday! for publication by Research Games Inc.

In 1988, Otto Maier Verlag redeveloped the game, adding random elements (the suitcase cards and the random destination on Sunday) and double points on two days, and retitled the German version Das Erbe des Maloney. The game was released in several other languages, including English (Maloney's Inheritance) and French (L'Heritage de Maloney).

== Reception ==
In Issue 4 of Games International, Brian Walker did not like the revisions to Sackson's original game, commenting, "The game is fun to play but is marred by the changes to the original version that Ravensburger have inexplicably introduced." Walker gave the game a rating of 3 out of 5.

In Issue 50 of the French games magazine Jeux & Stratégie, Michel Brassinne called this "A very original game, both simple and subtle, which leaves very little room for chance, and where intuition, calculation and cunning are the masters of the game." Brassinne noted "Suitcases introduce a 'luck factor' into the game in a simple and effective way. They cause surprising little twists and turns, especially at the end of the game." Brassinne concluded by giving the game an excellent rating of 9 out of 10 for originality.

== Other recognition ==
The British Museum holds a set of toy money from the English-language version of the game in their collection. (Registration number 2019,4012.156)
