= Backstreet Boys: Puzzles in Motion =

- Developer: Ravensburger Interactive
- Publisher: Determined Productions
- Platforms: Windows; Macintosh
- Release: August 1999
- Genre: Puzzle

Backstreet Boys: Puzzles in Motion, also known as Puzzles in Motion: Backstreet Boys, is a 1999 video game developed by Ravensburger Interactive and published by Determined Productions. It is for ages 8 and up.

== Gameplay ==
Puzzles in Motion: Backstreet Boys has the player solve tile‑based picture puzzles built from short looping video clips of the band. The game divides each clip into a grid of tiles that are mixed—and optionally rotated or mirrored—before play, and the player must reassemble the moving image by placing the tiles back into their correct positions. There are twelve clips available at the start, with a thirteenth unlocked after completing them, and each clip runs only two to three seconds on a continuous loop. Difficulty settings determine how many tiles the clip is broken into and whether rotation is included, and each attempt randomizes tile placement. Replay comes from these difficulty variations and from trying to improve previous completion scores.

== Reception ==
Reception

Review scores
| Publication | Score |
|---|---|
| All Game Guide | 1/5 |
| FamilyPC | 84% |
| PC Joker | 68% |
| Public Opinion | 3/5 |

The New York Times called Backstreet Boys Puzzles in Motion a really elegant piece of interactive media. Writing for All Game Guide, Derek Williams wrote that fans of Backstreet Boys should steer clear of Puzzles in Motion.
