= Journey Through Europe =

Board game

the 1982 edition

the multi-lingual 1975 edition, Europareise / Journey Through Europe / Voyage En Europe

Journey through Europe or Explore Europe is a family board game in which the players travel around a map of Europe, rolling a die to move. When they have reached all their objective cities, they try to return home to win.

It is one of a series of travel games published by Otto Maier Verlag in Ravensburg starting with Reise um die Erde (Journey around the World), which was their first game in 1884. The publisher is now known as Ravensburger. The European version has been published in several editions.

== Description ==
Journey Through Europe is a board game for 2–6 players in which the players try to visit a number of cities on the map of Europe.

=== Components ===
The game comes with:

- game board (a map of Europe)
- six-sided dice
- city cards
- telegrams
- 6 player tokens
- 6 flags

=== Setup ===
Each player decides on a color to play, and receives that token and the matching flag. Each player draws a city card, which becomes the player's home city—the player marks it with their flag and places their token on it. Each player draws seven more city cards. Visiting these cities becomes each player's objective.

=== Gameplay ===
Each player rolls a die for movement to reach the cities needed. Upon reaching a required city, the player discards the relevant city card.

Special rules:

- Only one player is allowed in a city at a time. If one player is already visiting a city, other players must wait for it to be vacated before they can stop in the city or move through it.
- Players cannot move through another player's home city on the same turn. The player instead must end their turn outside the other player's home city, then move through it on their next turn.
- The third time a player rolls a six, they receive a telegram and must immediately follow its instructions.

=== Victory conditions ===
The first player to reach all of their objective cities and then return to their home base is the winner.

== Newer versions ==
Versions of the game published after 1980 have rules for air and sea travel, as well as a two-sided map, one side depicting national borders, the other a geographical map.

=== Air travel ===
Each player receives a flight plan, which divides the map into six zones. To fly from one airport to another within the same zone costs two movement points. The player can also fly into an adjacent zone (directly east–west or north–south, but not diagonally) for 4 movement points.

=== Sea travel ===
A player arriving at a port ends their turn there. The next turn, the player moves to the next port without a die roll.

== Publication history ==
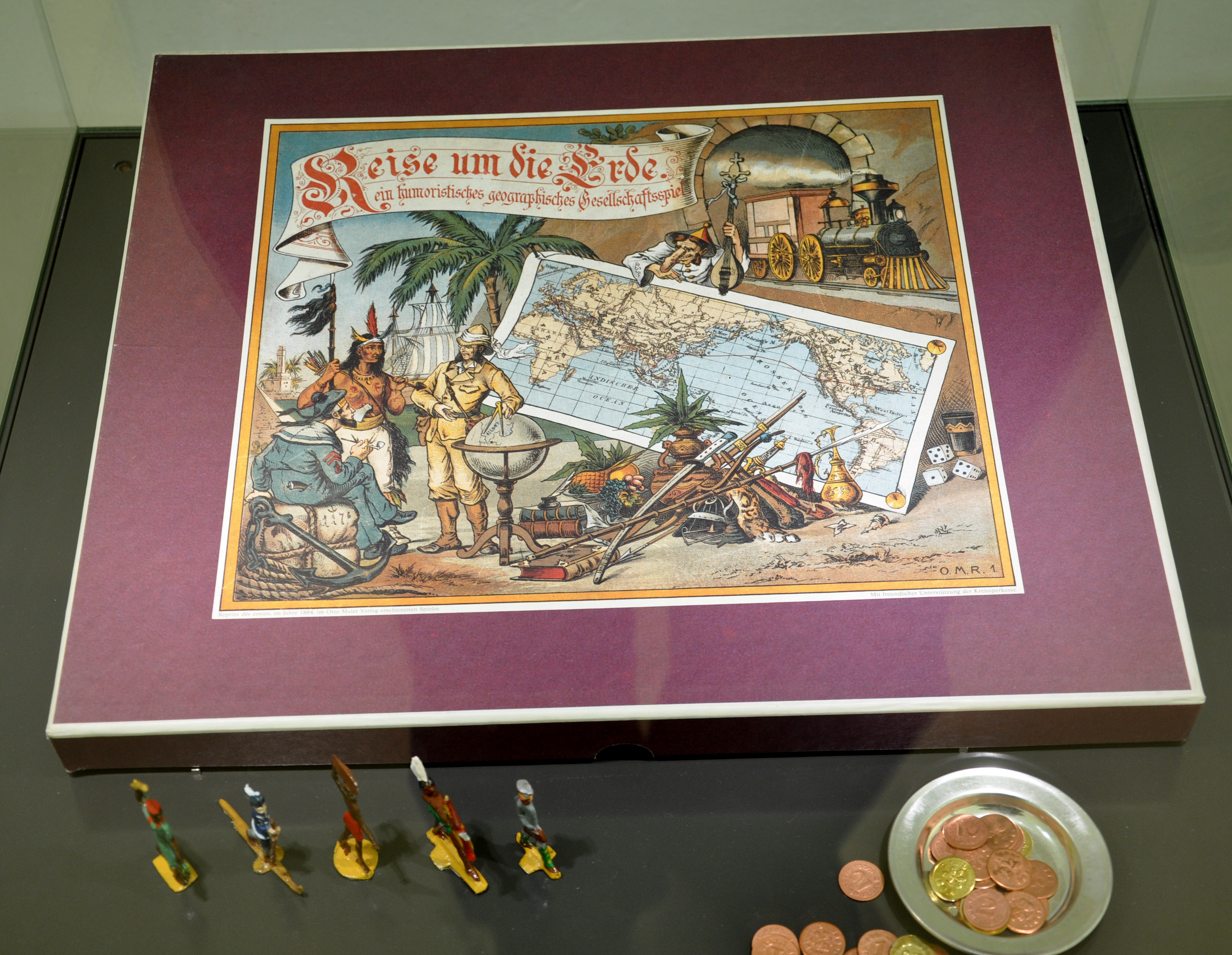
Reise um die Erde (Journey around the World) – the first game published by Otto Maier

Deutschland-Reise which used a map of Germany in the 1930s.

In 1884, Otto Maier published their first game, Reise um die Erde (Journey around the World). This followed the success of Jules Verne's Around the World in Eighty Days, which was first published in German in 1873 as Reise um die Erde in 80 Tagen.

In 1935, Otto Maier Verlag published Deutschlandreise ("Germany Trip"), a game designed by Jochen Zeisse to encourage children to learn the names and locations of German cities. After World War II, a pan-European version of the game was redesigned by Hervert Vladimir Fuka, O. Fairgagnetr and Francesco Ricciardi, and released as Europareise ("Europe Trip") in 1954.

Ravensburger subsequently released English versions under the names Journey through Europe and Explore Europe, as well as versions in several other languages.

== Reception ==
Bernhard Fischer reviewed a newer version of this game for Reich der Spiele, and called it "a pretty well designed game that is ideal for schools and younger children." He did note that victory was more dependent on good die rolls than strategy, and given the limited number of cities, he questioned the long-term replayability.

Vandenbogaerde Fabrice reviewed the game for the Dutch game review site Spellenclub 13, and found the game too dependent on die rolls, suggesting that "You could just as well roll a die 10 times" to decide who wins. The only positive aspect of this game was that "The game can be useful for children, because they get to know Europe geographically."

Claudia Schless and Andreas Keirat, on the German review site Spielphase, also thought the game was too dependent on die rolls, and concluded by giving it a very poor rating of only 3 out of 10, calling it "rather monotonous".

== Other recognition ==
The virtual game museum Ludomu has included a copy of this game in its collection.
