= El Grande =

Board game

- Box cover of El Grande
- Designers: Wolfgang Kramer; Richard Ulrich
- Publishers: Hans im Glück; Rio Grande Games; 999 Games
- Players: 2–5
- Setup time: 5 minutes
- Playing time: 90 minutes
- Chance: Low
- Age range: 12 and up
- Skills: Strategy

El Grande is a German-style board game for 2-5 players, designed by Wolfgang Kramer and Richard Ulrich, and published in 1995 by Hans im Glück in German, by Rio Grande Games in English, and by 999 Games in Dutch. The game board represents renaissance-era Spain where the nobility (the Grandes) fight for control of the nine regions. El Grande was praised for its area-control mechanism, and was awarded the Spiel des Jahres prize and the Deutscher Spiele Preis in 1996. Following its release, several expansions and an alternative version were published.

== Gameplay ==
The game is played in nine rounds. There are no dice in the game, and players have many chances to influence the turn order. The original game has a number of action cards that are turned up each turn, which is the only source of randomness in the game. However, the effect of this luck is very small, since these cards are potentially available to be used by any player in the game.

Each player starts the game with a hand of identical cards (numbered 1–13) at the beginning of the game. These cards are used to bid for turn order. The person who plays the highest card chooses their action card first, etc., but each player may use each card only once in a given game. During each turn, players take Caballeros and execute an action card, which includes two actions, a special action and placing Caballeros. During three of the nine rounds, scoring occurs, which involves players choosing secret regions, scoring the Castillo, which is a tower where Caballeros are placed inside, moving Caballeros from the Castillo to secret regions, and scoring other individual regions. The main challenge of the game is keeping track of the many factors that determine the balance of power in the regions and the score track.

== Reception ==
Upon its release, the area control mechanism of the game was praised, with Geoffrey Engelstein, writing in Building Blocks of Tabletop Game Design, describing the game's area control mechanism as an "elegant example of European design sensibilities applied to the American-style conflict games". Christian T. Petersen comments: "El Grande showed me the surprising depth that could be achieved by interlocking simple mechanisms — the principle that lies at the heart of the German school of design." Mikko Saari from Lautapeliopas also praised the game's replayability and components, but critiqued its scalability under four players. Dicebreaker also commented that the game was a "time-proven, award-winning classic". Similar sentiments were expressed by reviewers for Polish portals Polter and GamesFanatic.

The game was awarded the Spiel des Jahres prize in 1996. The jury praised strategy, "clearly structured" gameplay, the game board landscape designed by the artist Doris Matthäus, and the "well-explained" rules despite the complexity, concluding that the "two authors have impressively succeeded in bringing all this together into a harmonious whole". The jury commented that despite some elements of luck, player control is more emphasised. Stewart Woods, writing in Eurogames: The Design, Culture and Play of Modern European Board Games, described it as "relatively complex" compared to other winners. El Grande also won the 1996 Deutscher Spiele Preis.

== Reviews ==
- Casus Belli #97
- Backstab #21

== Expansions ==
Following El Grande's release, several expansions were released, including Konig & Intrigant in 1997, which replaced several action and power cards. Grand Inquisitor & Colonies, which added regions, was also released in the same year; subsequently, the Grandissimo expansion was published, adding action cards. In 1998, El Caballero, which was based upon El Grande, was released, with the Spiel des Jahres jury describing the game as an "independent, attractive placement game".
