= Take It Easy (game) =

Board game

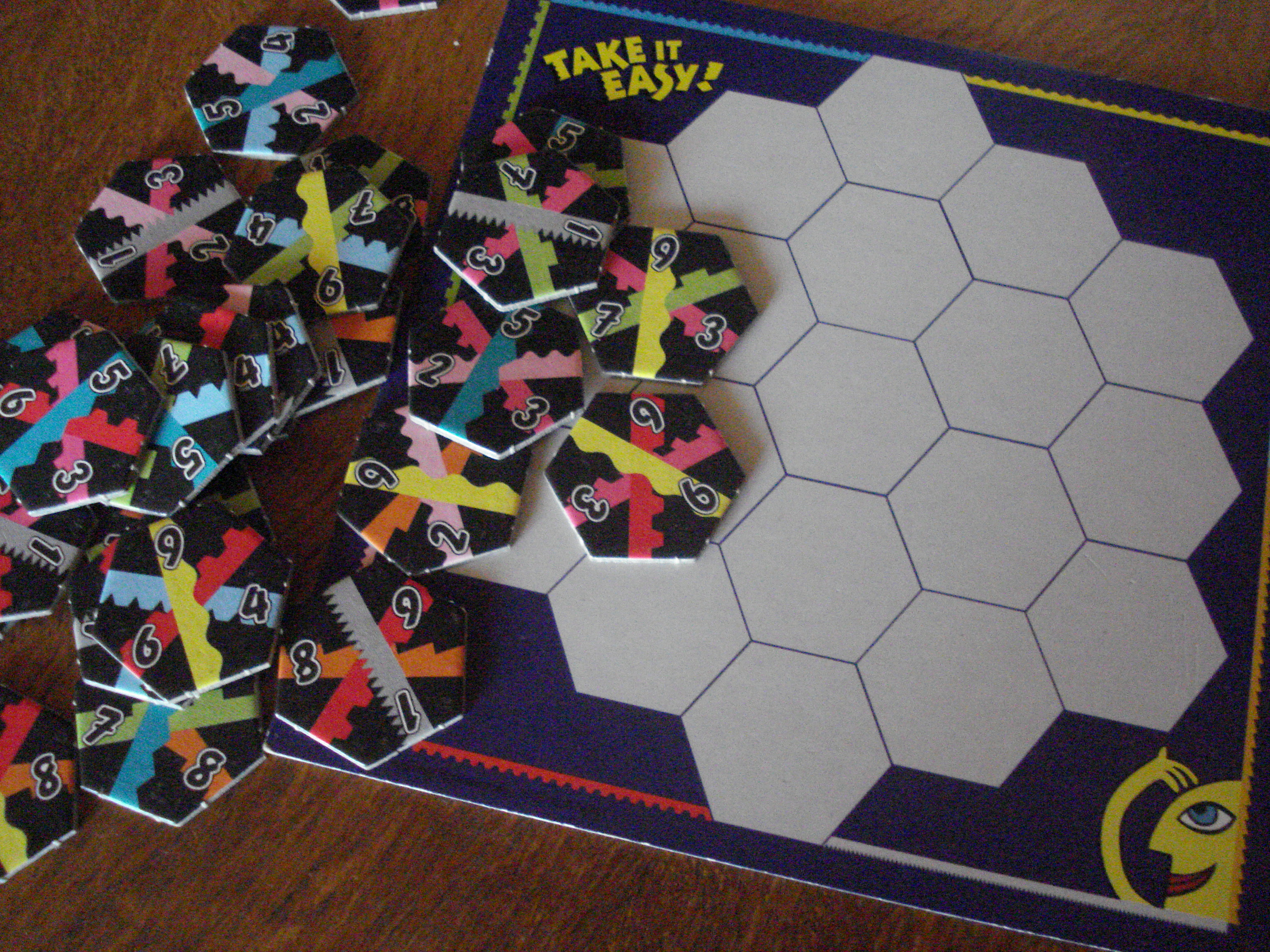
- Board and tiles
- Years active: 10+
- Players: 1+ (4 sets included in a single box)
- Playing time: 20 min

Take It Easy is an abstract strategy board game created by Peter Burley. It can be characterized as a strategic bingo-like game, and has been published by Ravensburger and subsequently by several other publishers since 1983.

== Gameplay ==
Standard 19-cell board

To start, each player takes a board with 19 hexagonal cells arranged as a 3×3 hexagon. Additionally, each player takes a set of 27 tiles which have different combinations of colored/numbered paths; the paths are arranged as a triple-cross, linking opposite sides (Van Ness Serpentiles notation 300). The color of the board's playing field matches the background of the tiles for each player.

5-7-4 tile

One player, designated as the caller, draws a tile randomly and then announces to the others which tile was drawn by declaring the three-digit combination (e.g., "5-7-4" would refer to the value of the vertical path, the value of the path crossing from lower left to upper right, and the value of the path crossing from upper left to lower right, in that sequence). Each player then puts their copy of that tile on their board in any available spot. Tiles must be placed so the numbers remain upright (e.g., the 1-, 5-, and 9-series lines must always be vertical).

The upright-number rule forces each path to be one of three numbers and determines the number of possible tiles (27):

Path direction	Possible values		
Vertical	1	5	9
Lower left to upper right	2	6	7
Upper left to lower right	3	4	8

The caller then repeats the drawing and announcement, followed by player placement, until the board is filled. Each player assesses their score and caller duties rotate to the next player until a total of four rounds have been played.

=== Objective ===
The player with the highest cumulative score after four rounds is the winner.

Although the selection of the tile is random, the placement of the tiles determines the ending score. The object is to complete colored/numbered lines across the board. When a contiguous path is completed from edge to edge, the score of the contiguous path is the number of tiles multiplied by the line value, so the maximum single-line score is 45 points (=5×9 vertical tiles along the center of the board).

=== Maximum score ===
One configuration that scores the maximum 307 points

The maximum possible combined score for all lines is 307 points; there are sixteen possible configurations that achieve this score.

== Sequels and variants ==
=== Take it Higher ===
Take it Higher! is a sequel game coauthored with Reiner Knizia that uses octagonal tiles and a 3×2, 24-cell board with prepopulated square interstitial spaces. In addition to the basic game, bonus points can be scored with special tiles.

=== Take it to the Limit ===
Take it to the Limit! is an advanced version of Take it Easy! that uses a larger 64 hexagonal tileset (per player) on an expanded 4×4, 37-cell Nexus board, or a subset of those tiles on a 22-cell Orchid board.

=== Daffodil Edition ===
In 2016, Burley Games released a limited (1000 copies) "Daffodil Edition" for Take It Easy! with double-sided playing boards. The Daffodil board printed on the reverse side of the standard (19-cell) board features 21 hexagonal cells arranged as 3 adjacent 2×2 (7-cell) hexagonal "flowers". Each flower has a prepopulated free cell at its center, continuing any adjacent lines.

In addition, there are four wild card tiles, in which two or three paths are allowed to be any of the three possible values. The wild card tiles are:

1. (1|5|9)-(2|6|7)-(3|4|8) (three paths wild)
2. 1-(2|6|7)-(3|4|8) (two paths wild)
3. (1|5|9)-2-(3|4|8) (two paths wild)
4. (1|5|9)-(2|6|7)-3 (two paths wild)
Game board variants

"Take it Higher!"

"Nexus"

"Orchid"

"Daffodil"

== Digital releases ==
The game was published by Ravensburger Digital for smartphones and tablets. It was released for iOS and Android in 2012.
