= Mexica (board game) =

Board game designed in 2002

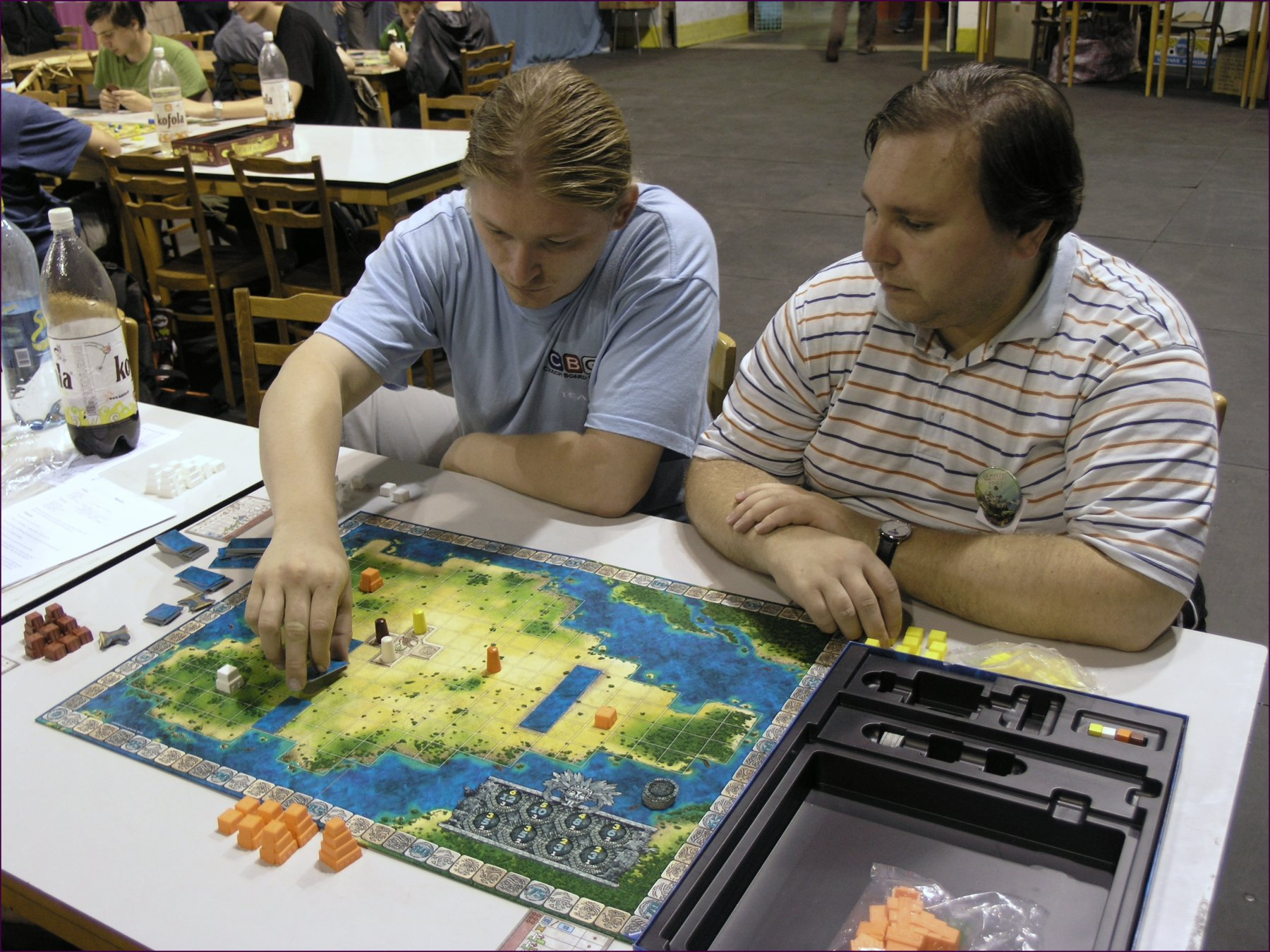
- Players: 2–4
- Setup time: 10 minutes
- Playing time: 60–75 minutes
- Chance: None
- Age range: 10 +
- Skills: Strategic thought

Mexica is a board game designed by Wolfgang Kramer and Michael Kiesling and published in 2002 by Ravensburger in German and Rio Grande Games in English. Mexica was awarded 5th prize in the 2002 Deutscher Spiele Preis.

Mexica is the third game in the Mask Trilogy, after Tikal and Java. In the game, players attempt to partition the city of Tenochtitlan in Lake Texcoco into districts, and then gain influence over the most developed districts.
