= Tikal (board game) =

Board game

- Designers: Wolfgang Kramer; Michael Kiesling
- Publishers: Ravensburger; Rio Grande Games
- Players: 2–4
- Setup time: 10 minutes
- Playing time: 60–90 minutes
- Chance: Medium
- Age range: 10+
- Skills: Strategic thought

Tikal is a German-style board game designed by Wolfgang Kramer and Michael Kiesling and published in 1999 by Ravensburger in German and by Rio Grande Games in English. Set in a Central American jungle, in Tikal players aim to discover artifacts, excavate, and maintain temple control to gain victory points.

== Gameplay ==
The gameplay is turn-based, with the victor decided by victory points which can be achieved by finding artifacts, excavating, and maintaining control over temple sites. The theme of the game is that of adventurers exploring parts of a Central American jungle in which artifacts and temples are discovered.

== Reception ==
Tikal received positive reviews and won numerous awards, including the Spiel des Jahres, the Deutscher Spiele Preis in 1999, and the Games Magazine Best Multiplayer Strategy Game in 2000. It was the first game in the Mask Trilogy, followed by Java and Mexica.

Warren Spector comments: "Once you're hooked on Tikal, you can move on to the other games in Kiesling and Kramer's 'Mask' trilogy. The games Mexica and Java share some mechanics, but feature different settings, fiction, and some new gameplay elements. Try them, for sure, but if you're like most people, you'll find yourself coming back to Tikal, once the novelty of the newer games wears off. As is so often the case, the first is still the best."

In a review in the February 2000 issue of InQuest Gamer, Tom Slizewski stated that the game is easy to learn and fun, and that "every component is a thing of beauty". He also said that it is primarily a tactical game requiring "constant mental calculation to play well" but that the game mechanics are straightforward.

== Reviews ==
- Backstab #19
