= Lotus (board game) =

Board game designed by Dominique Tellier

Lotus is a board game for two to four players, developed by Dominique Tellier and published by Ravensburger Spieleverlag. The objective of the game is to move one's pieces off the board before the other players. The game board is hexagonal, and contains a large image of a Chinese dragon in the middle, as well as a Chinese character in each board position.

== Gameplay ==
For a two-player game, one player is given ten white pieces while the other player gets ten black pieces. The pieces are stacked in the middle of the board as one stack of four pieces, one stack of three pieces, one stack of two pieces, and one stack of one piece. For a three or four-player game, each player gets six pieces, stacked in the middle in stacks of three, two, and one.

During the game, each player takes turns moving their pieces in an attempt to get to the exit space on the game board. A player can only move a piece that is at the top of a stack or is the only piece left in a stack. The height of the stack determines how far a piece can be moved on the board.

The board has two entrance positions, both of which can be freely chosen by players to move their pieces to, but it has only one exit position. During the game, pieces cannot be moved backwards.

During a player's turn, they may stack any of their colored pieces on top of any other pieces or empty positions. After the game starts, there is no limit to how many pieces can be in a stack. Players can freely choose which of their pieces to move, regardless of which part of the board they are on.

The board also includes trampoline spaces, which allow players to double their dice roll upon landing.

There are two types of play for when players have no possible moves. In regular gameplay, if no piece of a player's color is on top of a stack or by itself on a square, they cannot move any of their pieces. A player can, however, move any other player's pieces forward, or they can lose their turn, giving their adversaries an advantage in both cases.

The finishing position is after the last square on the board. Pieces that get to the finishing position are removed from the game. The game is over when a player has removed all their pieces via the finishing position.
