= Villainous (board game) =

Asymmetric strategy board game

- Designers: Prospero Hall
- Publishers: Wonder Forge; Ravensburger
- Publication: 2018; 8 years ago
- Genres: Asymmetric game; Strategy game
- Players: 2–6
- Playing time: 45–120 minutes
- Age range: 10+

Villainous is an asymmetric strategy board game designed by Prospero Hall and published by Wonder Forge and Ravensburger in 2018. The game is for 2–6 players, and each player chooses to play as a Disney villain, with their own special abilities and objectives to win the game. Villainous has spawned many expansions with more playable villain characters, and spin-offs including Marvel Villainous and Star Wars Villainous.

== Publishing history ==
Villainous was designed by the independent game design studio Prospero Hall, with core game mechanics coming from Aaron Donogh and Brian Kirk. The rights to use Disney villains were licensed by Wonder Forge, who had previously published games such as Eye Found It! and Pictopia: Disney Edition in co-operation with The Walt Disney Company. The original edition of the game, Villainous: The Worst Takes it All featured the villains Maleficent, Ursula, The Queen of Hearts, Jafar, Prince John, and Captain Hook, and was first released in August 2018 with a debut at Gen Con. Villainous was initially published jointly by Wonder Forge and its parent company Ravensburger, with later expansions and spin-offs published solely by Ravensburger.

== Gameplay ==
Each player chooses a different Disney villain to play and takes the corresponding character's moving piece, realm board, villain guide, deck of villain cards, and deck of fate cards. Players place the moving piece to the left of the realm board and draw four cards the villain deck as their hand. Play starts in clockwise order, and on a player's turn they first have to move to a new location on their board. When they have done this, they will have a maximum of 4 actions they can perform. A player must end their turn with 4 cards in their deck.

The player who achieves their Villain's objective first is the winner of the game.

=== Actions ===
During a player's turn, they can perform different actions depending on what is symbolized in their location on their realm board.

Action	Ability
Gain Power	Gives the player the ability to collect power tokens from the Cauldron. Power tokens can pay the cost of playing cards
Play a Card	Gives the player the ability to play a card from their hand and carrying out what it says on the card. Cards can either be an Ally, Condition, Effect, Hero or Item.
Activate	Gives the player the ability to activate and perform an ability of an Ally or Item in their realm. Activate does not mean that the player discards the Ally or Item.
Fate	Gives the player the ability to reveal the top two cards of an opponent's Fate deck. The player chooses one to perform and discards the other in their oppononent's Fate discard pile.
Move an Item or Ally	Gives the player the ability to move an Ally or Item in their realm to an adjacent location.
Move a Hero	Gives the player the ability to move a Hero to an adjacent location
Vanquish	Gives the player the ability to defeat a Hero in their realm by using one or more Allies. Players must discard the Allies after they have been used
Discard Cards	Gives the player the ability to discard as many cards from their hand as they wish.

== Expansions and spin-offs ==
As of August 2026, Ravensburger has published nine Disney Villainous expansions and two repackaged sets, adding numerous additional rules, realms and characters: Wicked to the Core (2019), Evil Comes Prepared (2019), Perfectly Wretched (2020), Despicable Plots (2021), Bigger and Badder (2022), Introduction to Evil (2023), Filled with Fright (2023), Sugar and Spite (2024), Treacherous Tides (2025), Success at any Cost (2026), Darkness Brewing (2026), and Come, We Fly! (2026). These expansions are generally compatible with each other and can be played together.

Ravensburger also published the spin-offs Marvel Villainous and Star Wars Villainous and their expansions, which keep much of the same game structure but with new villains and mechanics themed around other Disney properties. Disney Villainous Unstoppable! was released in 2025, adapting the game mechanics of Villainous into a faster paced and simpler standalone game.

== Reception ==
GamesRadar+ called the game "surprisingly tactical" and recommended the game for adults to play rather than children, because of its more complex rules. Nate Anderson, writing for Ars Technica, also noted the complexity of the rules and acknowledged the cheap game components, but praised the game's theme, artwork, and asymmetrical gameplay, calling it an "easy "buy” recommendation" for Disney fans. In a review for PC Gamer, Rafael Cordero admired the "unique and nuanced" gameplay each villain provides and emphasized the game's replayability.

Villainous: The Worst Takes it All won the 2019 Toy of the Year "Game of the Year" award.

Official tournaments for Villainous were established by Ravensburger at conventions such as Gen Con and PAX Unplugged in North America, Europe, and Australia.

Ravenburger's success with Villainous allowed them later to utilize their connection with Disney to produce the trading card game Disney Lorcana.

=== Sales ===
In 2022, it was reported that Disney Villanious and Marvel Villainous: Infinite Power sold nearly three million units together.
