= F.X. Schmid =

- Company type: GmbH & Co. KG
- Industry: Publishing
- Founded: 1860
- Defunct: 1996
- Fate: Taken over by Ravensburger
- Headquarters: Prien am Chiemsee
- Products: Playing cards, card and board games, puzzles
- Revenue: DM 67 million (1995)
- Number of employees: c. 300

For over a century until 1996, F.X. Schmid was an important German manufacturer of playing cards (traditional card games and quartets), board games and puzzles. It was considered one of the major European manufacturers. In 1995, its turnover was 67 million DM and there were around 250 employees.

The publishing house has been a wholly owned subsidiary of Ravensburger since 1996. The name F.X. Schmid is used today in the field of children's books and playing cards by Ravensburger.

== History ==
German entrepreneur, Franz Xaver Schmid, founded the publishing house in Munich in 1860, which produced toys and cards. The company was then run as the United Munich Playing Card Factories (Vereinigte Münchener Spielkarten-Fabriken) in 1915. During the Second World War the company relocated its headquarters to Prien am Chiemsee. The manufacture and production of board games and puzzles started there in 1955. In 1977 the site was expanded and there was a branch in the United States.

In 1991, the playing card programme of F.X. Schmid was integrated into the production of the ASS Altenburger in Thuringia. ASS Altenburger was thus involved in its market expansion. In 1996, the company ran into economic difficulties and in 1997 merged with Ravensburger. There, initially under the name FX, an attempt was made to establish its own image as "games for young adults". In 2000, the game series was discontinued in the wake of the decline in sales on the game market. Since about 2002, the F.X. Schmid brand has been used by Ravensburger for children's books. Playing cards for popular games such as Skat and Schafkopf are still produced under the brand name of F.X. Schmid and is the last manufacturer of German Tarock playing cards. The cards are of the Tarot Nouveau pattern, depicting genre scenes, and are produced for the Baden game of Cego.

== Successful games (selection) ==
F.X. Schmid achieved success with numerous games on the German-speaking and international games market, including:

- Auf Achse (Spiel des Jahres 1987)
- Hoity Toity (Spiel des Jahres 1990)
- Bluff (Spiel des Jahres 1993)
- Torres (Spiel des Jahres 2000, Label FX)

In addition it has published the games of Set!, Schraumeln, Phase 10, Quarto!, Kuhhandel, Ein solches Ding, Breakaway Rider, New York, New York and others.
