= Breakaway Rider =

Board game

Breakaway Rider (also called Das Favorit and Der Ausreißer) is a board game published in 1963 by F.X. Schmid.

== Gameplay ==
Breakaway Rider is a game in which cyclists play cards to take the lead in a race by playing the card with the highest value.

== Reception ==
Brian Walker reviewed the game as Der Ausreisser for Games International magazine, and gave it 3 stars out of 5, and stated that "The problem is that you seem to have little control over your destiny, all of which makes this a great game for fatalistic cyclists, but what about the rest of us? Just to show the democratic forces at work within the confines of GI House, an extra star has been added to the rating to take into account those whose views differ."

Der Ausreißer was nominated for the 1989 Spiel des Jahres.
