= Michael Kiesling =

German board game designer (born 1957)

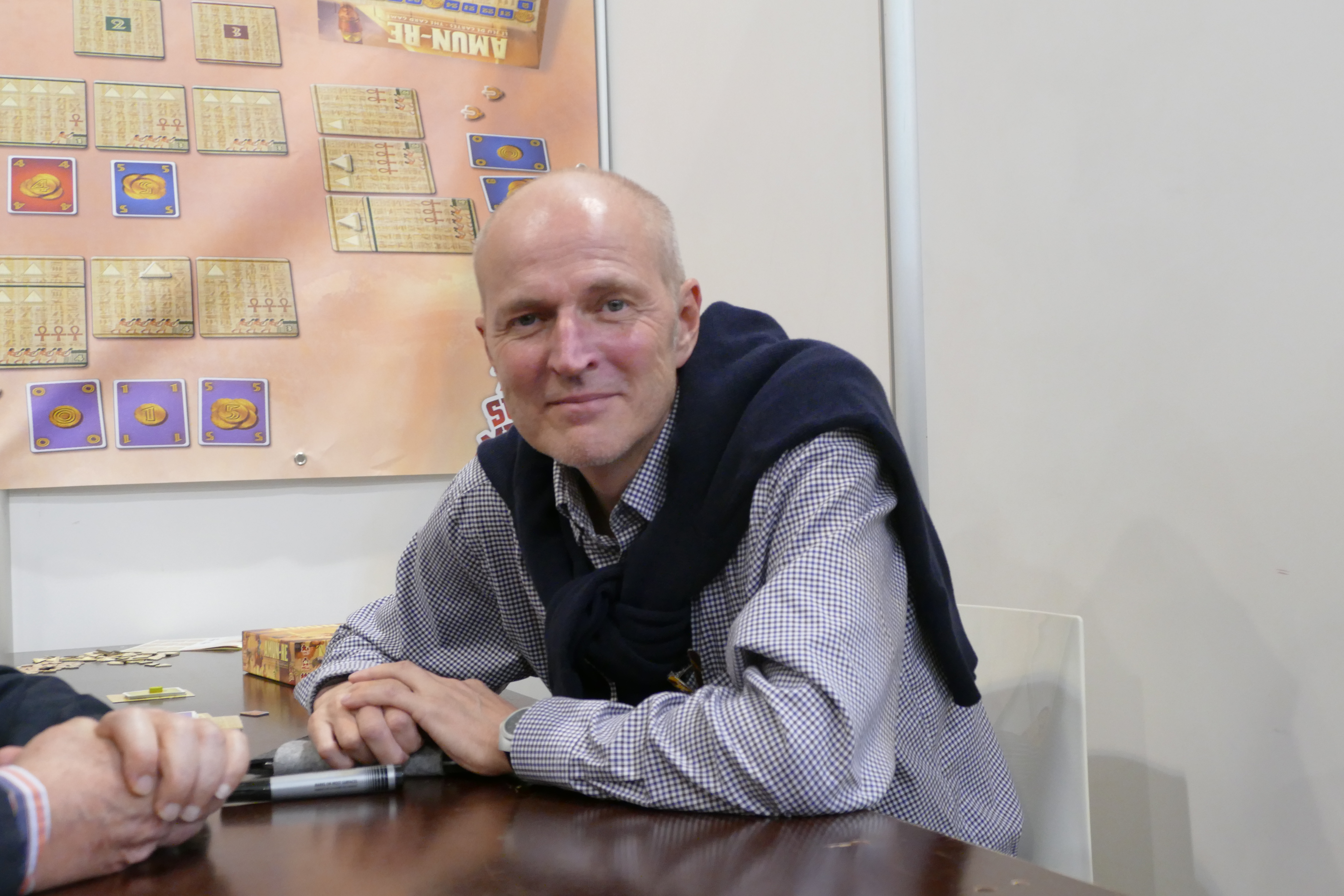
Image of Michael Kiesling

Michael Kiesling (born 1957) is a German board game designer. Many of his games have been nominated for or have won the Spiel des Jahres, a German games award.

Kiesling began working as a full time game designer in 1989. In 1988, he was one of the signatories of the "Coaster Proclamation" by a consortium of German game designers at the Nuremberg Toy Fair vowing not to allow distributors to produce game without being properly credited on the game box. The movement successfully ensured greater recognition of game designers in the German game industry.

He is best known for the 2018 Spiel des Jahres winner Azul and for co-authoring with Wolfgang Kramer the board game trilogy Tikal, Java, and Mexica, as well as Torres.

== Notable games ==
- 1999 Tikal (together with Wolfgang Kramer) - winner, Spiel des Jahres and Deutscher Spiele Preis
- 2000 Torres (with Wolfgang Kramer) - winner, Spiel des Jahres; 2nd place, Deutscher Spiele Preis
- 2000 Java (with Wolfgang Kramer)
- 2002 Mexica (with Wolfgang Kramer)
- 2004 Maharaja: The Game of Palace Building in India (with Wolfgang Kramer) - Spiel des Jahres Nominee
- 2005 Verflixxt! (with Wolfgang Kramer) - nominated, Spiel des Jahres
- 2010 Asara (with Wolfgang Kramer) - nominated, Spiel des Jahres
- 2010 Tikal II (with Wolfgang Kramer)
- 2012 The Palaces of Carrara (with Wolfgang Kramer) - Kennerspiel des Jahres Nominee
- 2014 Abluxxen (with Wolfgang Kramer) - Spiel der Spiele Winner
- 2017 Azul - Spiel des Jahres Winner
- 2017 Heaven and Ale - Kennerspiel des Jahres Nominee
- 2023 Wandering Towers (with Wolfgang Kramer)
- 2024 Intarsia (Pegasus Spiele)
