= Top Secret Spies =

German-style board game

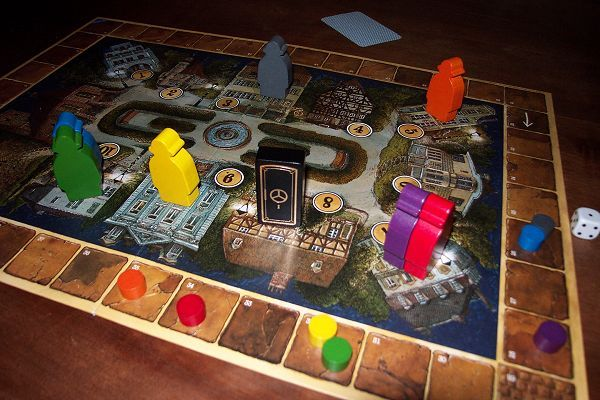
Heimlich & Co

Top Secret Spies (German: Heimlich & Co.) is a spy-themed German-style board game designed by Wolfgang Kramer and published in 1984 by Ravensburger. The game, also known as Under Cover or Detective & Co, won the Spiel des Jahres award in 1986.

== Gameplay ==
The object of the game is to score the most points, while not revealing which colour you are until the end. It requires good bluffing and analytical skills. 7 colours are used, and there can be up to 4 "robot" colours moving around. On their turn a player rolls a die and can move any number of pieces a total number of spaces that adds up to the number on the die. This can result in a score, and the game continues until one player reaches 129+ points. At this time all players make secret guesses as to which player is which colour (gaining +5 points at the end of the game for each correct answer). The game ends when a spy reaches 142+ points, and then a winner is determined after guess points are added.

== Reception ==
Upon its release the game won the Spiel des Jahres award in 1986. It is remembered in part as the first game to feature a score track encircling the board, now a common feature in many games, as well as the game that introduced thin wooden human-shaped gaming pieces (meeples). In a 1990 interview, Kramer revealed that Heimlich & Co. was not one of his personal favourites.

== Reviews ==
- Games #76 (as "Under Cover")
- 1986 Games 100 (as "Under Cover")
