= Disney Lorcana =

Collectible card game

- Backside of a Lorcana card
- Designers: Ryan Miller and Steve Warner
- Publisher: Ravensburger
- Release date: August 18, 2023; 3 years ago
- Type: Trading card game
- Players: 2 or more
- Age range: 8+
- Cards: Minimum 60
- Playing time: 30-45 minutes
- Website: disneylorcana.com

Disney Lorcana is a collectible card game released by Ravensburger in collaboration with The Walt Disney Company in August 2023. It is Ravensburger's first trading card game and features characters from Walt Disney Animation Studios films and The Disney Afternoon series. Ravensburger North America CEO Filip Francke described Lorcana as "probably the largest investment that we have ever done into any type of project and initiative".

The premier set, "The First Chapter", was released to board game stores on August 18, 2023 and major retailers on September 1, 2023.

== Development and release ==
In June 2023, shortly before the game's release, Ravensburger and game co-designer Ryan Miller were sued by the latter's former employer, Upper Deck Company. The suit alleged that Disney Lorcana used game design elements from an unreleased trading card game, originally named Shell Beach and then renamed Rush of Ikorr, which Miller worked on while at Upper Deck. Ravensburger filed a motion to dismiss the lawsuit.

At an early release event at Gen Con tabletop game convention, customers waited in hours-long lines to purchase starter decks and booster packs. Cards with particularly high rarity quickly resold for hundreds of dollars prior to the game's initial release, while the promotional cards from the 2022 D23 Expo resold for prices between $1,000 and $3,000.

In 2023, the Disney Lorcana TCG Companion smart phone application was released to keep track of collected cards, build digital decks, access how-to-play information, track points during game play using a built-in lore counter, and see announcements about Lorcana.

Lorcana has featured characters from an eclectic range of Disney films and shows, and as of January 2025, each set has introduced characters from one or more new franchises. The designers have revealed plans to eventually include Pixar characters in future expansions.

== Story ==
Disney Lorcana is set in an imaginative world, where there are mysterious figures called "Illumineers". These are able to use "magical ink" to summon "glimmers", which are the various iterations of Disney characters. The world has "regions" called Inklands. At its center is a place called "The Great Illuminary". Its purpose is to be a repository to keep track of every story ever told, archived in the "Halls of Lorcana".

A mysterious sorcerer, "The Creator", created the Great Illuminary and has the ability to summon Glimmers to help them. The magical ink used to summon Glimmers come in six types: Ruby, Amethyst, Emerald, Sapphire, Steel, and Amber.

Three types of glimmers exist:

- Storyborn – characters featured in the original Disney sources (movies, comics, etc).
- Dreamborn – characters reimagined in different roles.
- Floodborn – characters born from the game fictional concept of a "cataclysmic ink flood": an event unleashed when a forbidden book was opened, changing heroes and villains alike into more powerful forms, though many magical "pieces of lore" were lost in the ink flood as well.

Players are tasked with summoning the characters and retrieving "lore points". These are explained as fragments of a larger story, and are kept in the Great Illuminary. But it has not been told as to who or what they are being kept safe from.

=== The First Chapter ===
One day, the Ilumineers disappear and the Great Illuminary calls upon players to be Illumineers themselves. There is a book of stories, a "lorebook", and a tool called an "inkcaster" that allows Illumineers to take the magical ink to create glimmers from the lorebook. Three particular youths are magically summoned to the Great Illuminary: Shayzan (a poet), Venturo (a programmer), and Martin (a musician).

=== Rise Of The Floodborn ===
Mickey finds seaweed with an evil aura, while Basil, the Great Mouse Detective, finds a secret room with an ominous-looking tome inside that was left by the sea witch Ursula. Martin goes into the book room alone. The front cover lights up, plays a few notes of a song, and then opens up after Martin finishes the song on his guitar. A torrential wave floods the Great Illuminary and transforms every character it comes in contact with. These transformed Glimmer characters are known as "Floodborn", where some cause trouble for the Illumineers.

=== Into The Inklands ===
Milo Thatch and his crew chart maps and discover ancient treasures. Venturo leads a crew of Audrey Ramirez, Prince Eric, and Tinker Bell, to search for one artifact in particular: King Triton's trident. The team finds the trident's location but then Ursula takes it. Unbeknownst to the team, there are two Ursulas: one is known as "Ursula, Deceiver of All" and the other is the regular sea witch.

The two Ursulas are planning something and recruiting other malicious Glimmers, like Prince Hans and the Queen of Hearts. The regular Ursula double-crosses her doppelgänger and seizes the trident to rule Lorcana alone.

=== Ursula's Return ===
Ursula's return with King Triton's trident grows to a giant and ensnares nearby characters. Mulan, Raya, and Beast are able to resist her. But several Glimmers are ensnared: Anna, Jafar, Minnie, and Bruno Madrigal. Ursula's pawns start destroying the Inklands. Mirabel finds a prophecy that shows Bruno becoming Ursula's slave, and then she asks her sister Luisa to help prevent the prophecy from coming true, but they fail. The rest of the Madrigal family join the fight against Ursula to defeat her and win. The Lore pieces Ursula had are set free, and her crown is destroyed.

=== Shimmering Skies ===
With Ursula defeated, the heros throw a party with fireworks. Martin performs on stage and his friends forgive him for Ursula's rise. The Great Illuminary suddenly begins to fall. Basil and Merlin the wizard find another secret room that contains an Ambert amulet. Meanwhile, a shadowy figure approaches the remains of Ursula's crown.

=== Azurite Sea ===
Set in the open seas, the Illumineers pretend to be pirates. Jim Hawkins from Treasure Planet helms the Illumineers' ship, while the Kakamora from Moana and entire cast of Big Hero 6 show up. The Illumineers aim to find the owner of a mysterious dropped Inkcaster, hoping to find the Curator to help restore the Great Illuminary. Mr. Smee from Peter Pan secretly conspires with Captain Hook to make the journey more dangerous. Aladdin's nemesis Jafar schemes his own plan, having touched the remnants of Ursula's crown, which was dubbed the "Hexwell" crown.

=== Archazia's Island ===
Illumineers arrive at a mysterious ancient island, where they meet Archazia, a wise female owl who is the implied owner of the found missing Inkcaster and knows extensive amount of Lorcana mythology. She speaks of the Hexwell Forge, a kiln that can produce magical artifacts, including the Hexwell Crown. Archazia also mentions that the Hexwell Crown is one half of a larger artifact, while also granting the team magical "coils" onto their Inkcasters that allow them to summon characters with dual ink affinities.

== Gameplay ==
With decks made up of at least 60 cards, players produce "ink", a resource that allows cards representing characters, items, and song lyrics from Disney media to be summoned. Turns follow a sequence of generating ink, playing cards, using actions from cards, and challenging opponents' character cards. While interacting with each other's cards, players attempt to accrue twenty points (known in game as "lore") before their opponent.

=== Ink types ===
Players summon Disney characters using different types of "ink". There are six ink types in the game:

- Amber – feature characters and spells that focus on defense and recovery.
- Amethyst – focuses on spells and abilities that manipulate cards in your hand.
- Emerald – includes characters and abilities that change and control gameplay.
- Ruby – cards focus on offensive strategies, like using the Rush (able to challenge the turn the character is played) and Evasive (only allowing other Evasive ability characters to attack the character) abilities.
- Sapphire – provides card draw, items, and ink resource management abilities.
- Steel – focused on unique power and defense characters and abilities.

=== Card types ===
There are four basic types of cards:

- Character – a person or creature from a Disney property. Characters can quest to gain lore or challenge other characters, but not on the turn they are first played. Each character has a Strength value (how much damage they do in challenges), a Willpower value (how much damage they can take before being discarded), and a Lore value (how many points they give you when they quest).
- Item – an object from a Disney property. Items can be used immediately and have passive or activated abilities.
- Action – an event or activity from a Disney property. Actions do not enter play; they are discarded after you fulfill their ability.
- Location (introduced in Into the Inklands) – a place from a Disney property. Locations passively accrue lore at the start of every turn, and characters can enter them to receive some sort of benefit. All locations have a Willpower value (they can also be challenged), a Lore value, and a Move cost (how much ink must be spent to put one of your characters there).

=== Shift mechanics ===
Shift is the ability to upgrade character cards in play with a different character card with the same name. This is accomplished by paying an alternate cost, usually in ink, for less than it would cost to play the card normally. Starting with the Ursula's Return expansion, the shift mechanic gained other ways of being activated beyond paying an ink cost. For example, players can discard a song card in order to play shift on top of another character.

=== Dual-ink cards ===
Starting with the Archazia's Island expansion, cards may be released having two types of ink compared with cards released up until this expansion having only one ink type. The first dual-ink card will be Belle, Mechanic Extraordinaire, which will be part Sapphire and Ruby ink types. Dual-ink type cards do not appear to have any additional abilities attached to them, but some speculate that these cards may accommodate limitations within different ink types. Moreover, dual-ink cards don't appear to be more powerful nor be more difficult to play.

=== Illumineer's Quest ===
Illumineer's Quest is a series of standalone games within the Lorcana franchise. The first installment, Illumineer's Quest: Deep Trouble, launched alongside the fourth set, "Ursula's Return". Deep Trouble can be played solo or cooperatively, with players working together to defeat Ursula, who is controlled by an automated system guided by a set of rules. The core gameplay follows the standard Lorcana rules and the challenge can be adjusted with four different difficulty levels. The second installment in the series, Illumineer's Quest: Palace Heist, was released alongside the "Reign of Jafar" expansion.

=== Pack Rush play format ===
Brand manager and co-designer Ryan Miller developed "Pack Rush" as an alternative play format for Lorcana. To play, it requires four sealed packs between two players. Each player gets two packs, which they open to create their deck. The two marketing cards from the two packs are used as immediate ink. The game ends when one player wins fifteen lore points instead of the usual twenty lore points. Miller says that this play format is designed for quicker play and novelty to all players of all skill types because the cards come from sealed packs.

== Card collecting ==
Cards come in different rarities that are located at the bottom center of the card. The rarities listed in increasing rarity are:

1. Common (gray circle)
2. Uncommon (white book)
3. Rare (bronze triangle)
4. Super Rare (silver diamond)
5. Legendary (gold pentagon)
6. Epic (rainbow semicircle with nib)
7. Enchanted (rainbow hexagon)
8. Iconic (rainbow octagon)

The Epic and Iconic rarity were introduced in the Fabled set.

== Expansions ==
List of expansions
Set number	Set name	Local game store release	Retail release	Notes	References
1	The First Chapter	August 18, 2023	September 1, 2023		
2	Rise of the Floodborn	November 17, 2023	December 1, 2023	Introduced "Resist" game mechanic	
3	Into the Inklands	February 23, 2024	March 8, 2024	Introduced "Locations" card type	
4	Ursula's Return	May 17, 2024	May 31, 2024	Introduced alternative shift costs and "Sing together" mechanic	
5	Shimmering Skies	August 9, 2024	August 23, 2024		
6	Azurite Sea	November 15, 2024	November 29, 2024		
7	Archazia's Island	March 7, 2025	March 21, 2025	Introduced "dual ink" and "Vanish" mechanics	
8	Reign of Jafar	May 30, 2025	June 6, 2025		
9	Fabled	August 29, 2025	September 5, 2025	Introduced two new rarities (Epic and Iconic)	
10	Whispers in the Well	November 7, 2025	November 14, 2025	Introduced "Boost" mechanic	
11	Winterspell	February 13, 2026	February 20, 2026		
12	Wilds Unknown	May 8, 2026	May 15, 2026		
13	Attack Of The Vine	July 17, 2026	July 24, 2026		
14	Hyperia City	October 16, 2026	October 23, 2026	Introduced "Inkdrops" mechanic	
15	Into the Inkdark	February 5, 2027	February 12, 2027		

The first expansion, "Rise of the Floodborn," was released on November 17, 2023. This 204-card expansion added characters from Pinocchio, The Jungle Book, The Great Mouse Detective, and other properties, and introduced a "Resist" game mechanic. The second expansion, "Into the Inklands," was officially announced on December 6, 2023. This expansion, also 204 cards, introduces characters from DuckTales, TaleSpin, Atlantis: The Lost Empire, and Treasure Planet; it also introduces a brand new card type, "Locations." Locations are well-known spots from Disney movies and television shows, and add a new mechanic and more strategy options into gameplay. "Into the Inklands" debuted in hobby stores on February 23, 2024, and was released on March 8, 2024. The third expansion, "Ursula's Return" was officially announced in February 2024 and introduces characters from Encanto. "Ursula's Return" was made available to mass markets on May 31, 2024. "Shimmering Skies" included characters from Wreck-It Ralph.

== Competitive play ==
=== Disney Lorcana challenge ===
Starting May 2024, the Disney Lorcana Challenge is an event circuit of tournaments and competitions for players of the game.

Competitions in North America
Dates	Held in	Winner
May 25–26, 2024	Atlanta, Georgia, United States	Joshua Paultre
June 8–9, 2024	Chicago, Illinois, United States	Brian Courtade
July 20–21, 2024	Fort Worth, Texas, United States	Edmond Chiu
August 24–25, 2024	Toronto, Ontario, Canada	Diego Saz
September 21–22, 2024	Las Vegas, Nevada, United States	Zan Syed
October 26–27, 2024	Seattle, Washington, United States	Luke Goodwin

Competitions in Europe
Dates	Held in	Winner
May 25–26, 2024	Lille, France	Frank Karsten
July 6–7, 2024	Bochum, Germany	Théotime Buchot
August 3–4, 2024	Bologna, Italy	Elie Vepierre
September 21–22, 2024	Birmingham, UK	Federico Marinangeli

Competitions in Oceania
Dates	Held in	Winner
February 1–2, 2025	Melbourne, Australia	Dinh Khang Pham

=== Regional championships ===
On December 6–8, 2024, the European Championship 2024 was held at the Disneyland Paris Resort. In the final, Domingo Martinez Rodenas was able to beat Michele Assirelli 3-2 to win the championship.

The North American Championship 2025 took place at the Disneyland Hotel in Anaheim, California on January 10–12, 2025. Edmond Chiu won the championship by beating Scott Markeson in the final.

=== World Championship ===
On June 28–29, 2025, the first World Championship of Lorcana was held at the Walt Disney World Resort in Orlando, Florida. Dinh Khang Pham was crowned World Champion after defeating Edmond Chiu in the final.

== Reception ==
Lorcana has been received well, having a score of 7.2 on BoardGameGeek, a Recommended from Polygon, and winning Best Ongoing Card Game at the 2023 Tabletop Awards. Moreover, Nerdist comments that Lorcana is "perfect for fans of Disney's animated films and trading card game beginners", which echos Polygon's note that "Lorcana is very easy to learn and play right out of the box".

Ravensburger North America's CEO Stephane Madi claims hearing a "number of players who have told us that Disney Lorcana TCG has given them a chance to share their love of the hobby with their families, or how it's brought a number of new faces to organized play events" and they "believe (and have heard from our partners and players) that Disney Lorcana TCG has grown the size of the TCG pie, as opposed to taking a piece of it". During the first season of the Disney Lorcana Challenge Series, over 17,000 players participated in nearly 150,000 games of the Disney Lorcana TCG.
