= Auf Achse =

Racing Board game

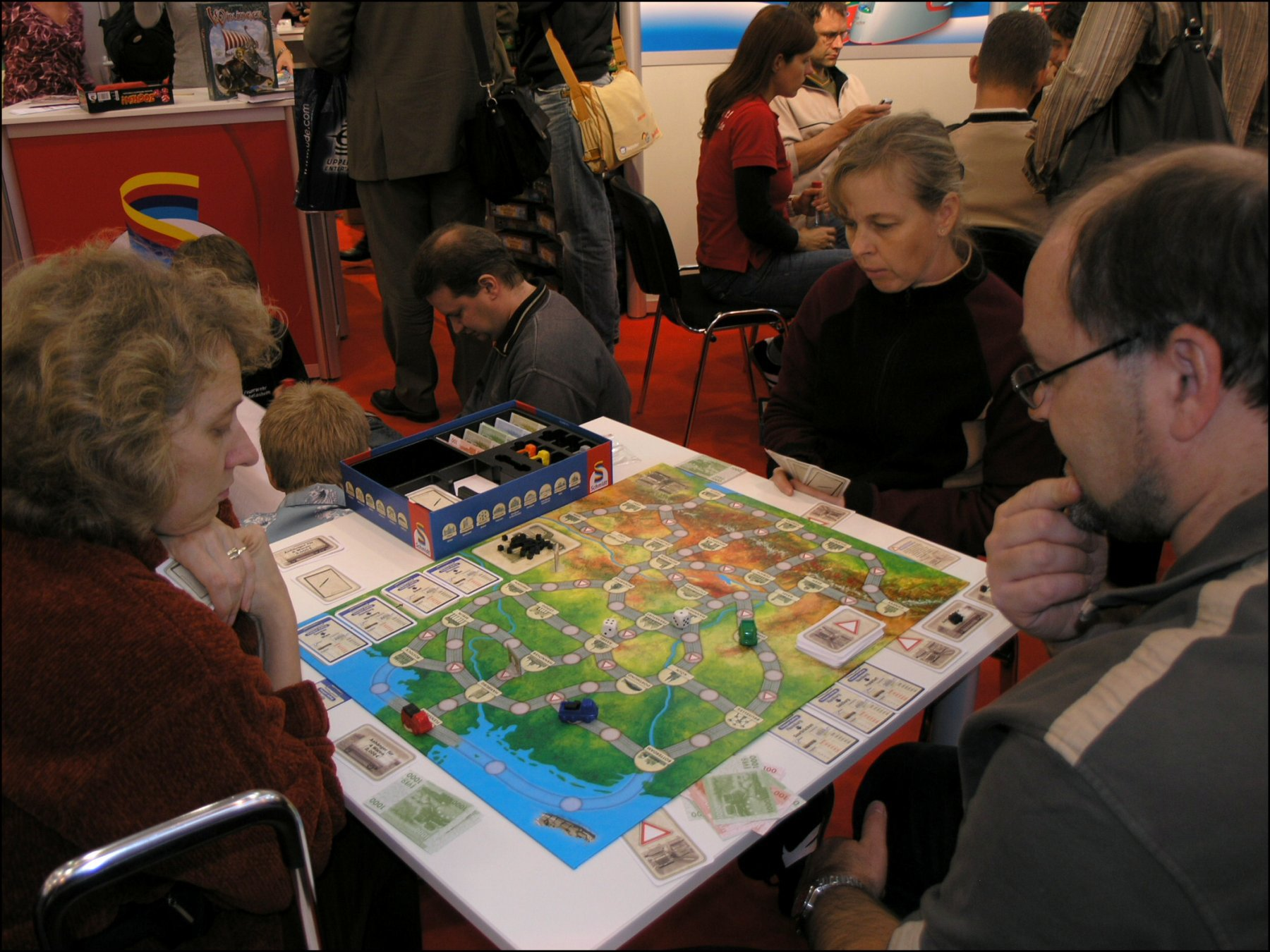
- Designers: Wolfgang Kramer
- Illustrators: Harald Lieske (2007 edition)
- Publishers: F.X. Schmid (1987) · Ravensburger (1996) · Schmidt Spiele (2007)
- Publication: 1987; 39 years ago
- Setup time: 5 minutes
- Playing time: 45–80 minutes
- Chance: Medium
- Skills: Route‑planning, auction bidding, probability assessment

Auf Achse (German: [aʊf ˈʔaksə], "on the road", lit. "on the axle") is a logistics-themed board game designed by Wolfgang Kramer and published in 1987 by FX Schmid. The game won the Spiel des Jahres award. In 1992, a junior edition was released; and in 1994 a rummy-like card game spinoff was released. In 2007 a revised edition was published by Schmidt Spiele.

In a 1990 interview, Kramer revealed that "Although it has sold very well, Auf Achse is not really one of my favourites."

== Gameplay ==
Each player starts with a truck pawn, a small cash reserve and three private freight contracts. On a turn the active player rolls one die (two dice in the 2007 edition) and moves along the road network; landing exactly in a city permits loading or unloading goods or, if it is not already busy, starting an auction for one of four public contracts that are always on display. Auctions are conducted with fixed incremental bids printed on the contract card; the initiator wins ties. Trucks may tow trailers, increasing carrying space from six to ten or twelve cubes at the cost of cash and manoeuvrability. Landing on a triangular space triggers an event card that can accelerate, impede or otherwise reshape the trip (e.g. snowstorms, road works, police checks). When the supply of public contracts is exhausted and a player has delivered their final cargo, cash is counted and the richest haulier wins.

== Digital adaptations ==
A real‑time, rules‑faithful implementation has been playable on the German portal BrettspielWelt since 2007, and a licensed Android app entitled Auf Achse – Logistics Board Game was released on Google Play in late 2024. Tabletop Simulator also hosts an unofficial mod curated through Steam Workshop.

== Spin‑offs and related games ==
- Auf Achse Junior (1992) — a streamlined children's version with reduced map and no auctions.
- Auf Achse – Das Kartenspiel (1995) — a rummy‑style card game reinterpretation by Kramer.

== Awards ==
Year	Award	Result
1987	Spiel des Jahres (Germany)	Winner
1988	À la carte Card‑Game Chart (spin‑off)	18th place (Das Kartenspiel)

== Legacy ==
By its 30th anniversary the game had reportedly sold close to one million copies worldwide and remains in print in German, Danish and Czech editions. Kramer himself has called it "one of my most surprising successes", noting that he initially viewed it as a light family diversion rather than a flagship design.

== See also ==
- Wolfgang Kramer
- Spiel des Jahres
- Eurogame
