= Torres (board game) =

1999 board game

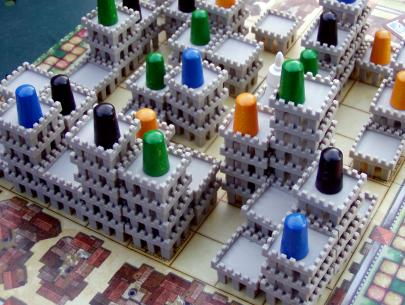
- Players build castles and maneuver their knights into and up the castles, receiving points based on the height of the castle.
- Designers: Wolfgang Kramer; Michael Kiesling
- Publishers: FX Schmid; Rio Grande Games
- Players: 2–4
- Setup time: 5 minutes
- Playing time: > 60 minutes
- Chance: Low (Basic rules); None (Master version)
- Age range: 12 +
- Skills: Strategic thought

Torres is a German-style board game designed by Wolfgang Kramer and Michael Kiesling and published in 1999 by FX Schmid in German and by Rio Grande Games in English. The game strongly influenced Kramer and Kiesling's Mask Trilogy of games, but is not considered to be a part of the trilogy. The game has since been reprinted (in 2005).

== Game play ==
Game play revolves around constructing an abstract set of castles set on a grid. Each player is allotted several knight pieces, which are placed within the castles. The higher the knights' placement during a scoring round, the greater the payoff for the controlling player.

The number of points a player receives per phase is based on the height times the surface area of the highest point of the castle that the knight is standing upon. If the knight is on the 3rd level of a castle, and the castle occupies 5 squares on the board, the player receives 15 points. A King piece is also placed on the board and acts as a bonus modifier to any knights that occupy the same level and castle as the King at the end of a phase.

The game is composed of three different phases, with each phase having three to four rounds each depending on the number of players. Each player has five action points (AP) to spend during a round. The following moves may be performed during a round:

- Place a new knight (2 AP) All new knights must be adjacent to existing knights, and may only occupy a level equal to or lower than the existing knight on the board.
- Place a new castle piece (1 AP) Castle pieces must be placed next to or on top of existing castle pieces. A castle's level cannot exceed the surface area, i.e., a castle occupying two squares on the map may only reach two levels in height. New castle pieces may not join two existing castles.
- Pick up an action card (1 AP) There are 40 different action cards which allow the player to perform special moves, such as moving the King piece, moving castle pieces, or moving knights diagonally. In the master version, each player begins with a full set of action cards in their hand. Purchasing an action card is no longer a possible action.
- Move a knight (1 AP/square) Knights may move one square per AP point spent, but may only move up one level, and may not move diagonally. Knights can go down any number of levels without spending AP.
- Gain one victory point (1 AP) Action points may be exchanged for victory points on a one-to-one basis.

Players receive three or four stacks of castle pieces per phase with two or three pieces per stack, depending on the current phase and number of players. A player may only use pieces from one stack per phase, but may transfer unused pieces to another stack for the next phase. After the last phase is reached all unused castle pieces are returned to the common supply and points are calculated. The king gives a bonus of five, ten, or fifteen points based on the scoring phase.

The number of victory points per player is kept by individual markers on the edge of the game board. Since no two markers can occupy the same victory point number, the last player to occupy the space will automatically be moved ahead by one victory point. The person in last place after each scoring phase may then move the King piece to another castle.

After the third phase, all victory points are calculated and the person with the highest number of points wins the game.

== Reception ==
The game won the Spiel des Jahres.
