= Wolfgang Kramer =

German board game designer (born 1942)

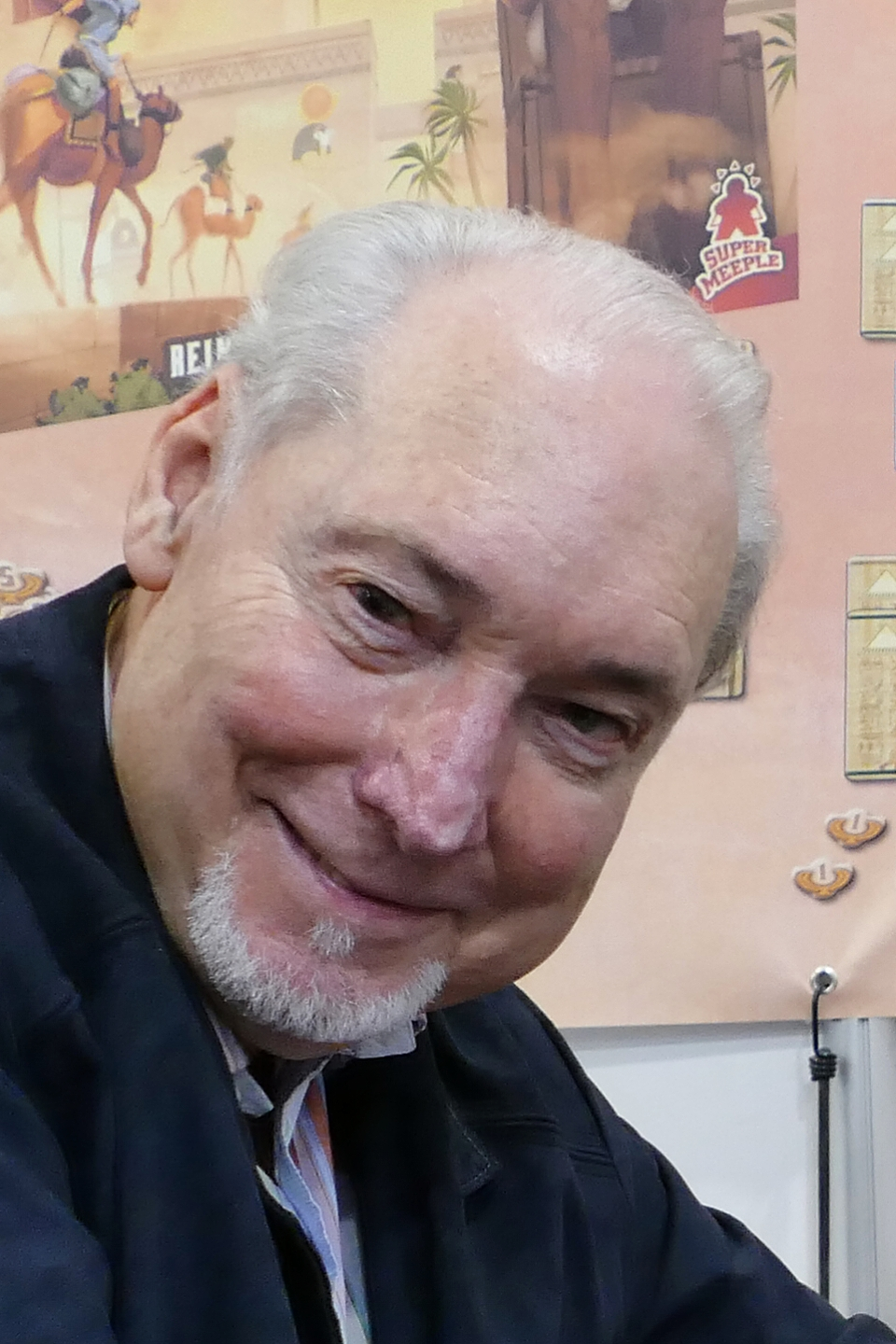
Wolfgang Kramer (Essen 2017)

Wolfgang Kramer (born 29 June 1942 in Stuttgart) is a German board game designer.

== Early life ==
As a young child, Wolfgang Kramer used to play games with his grandmother, and said he developed a positive attitude about games because "she always used to let me win." Although he started buying games in his teens, he found there wasn't much variety, so he started to modify some rules. His friends enjoyed the new rules and suggested he design his own games.

== Part-time games designer ==
While studying commercial science, Kramer started to develop a racing game that didn't use dice for movement. While working as an operations manager and computer scientist, he developed his new movement system into an abstract game called Tempo, and published it in 1974. He later modified this game into a car racing game called Formel Eins (Formula One). While still working full-time, he designed and published several more games, two of which won the Spiel des Jahres.

== Full-time games designer ==
Kramer became a full time game designer in 1989. He has designed over 100 games, many which have been nominated for or have won the Spiel des Jahres. He has frequently collaborated with other designers, notably Michael Kiesling and Richard Ulrich.

In 1984, Kramer invented a player score track that ran around the perimeter of the board for his game Heimlich & Co.. This type of scoring track became a feature of German-style board games, and is called the Kramerleiste (Kramer track) in his honour.

Kramer is also an author of mystery novels, including Der Palast der Rätsel (The Palace of Mysteries) and Die Rätsel der Pyramide (The Mysteries of the Pyramid).

== Notable games ==
- 1984 Heimlich & Co. (also published as Top Secret Spies, Undercover and Detective & Co.)- winner, Spiel des Jahres
- 1987 Auf Achse - winner, Spiel des Jahres
- 1994 6 nimmt! - winner, Deutscher Spiele Preis, Spiel des Jahres Recommended
- 1995 El Grande (with Richard Ulrich) - winner, Spiel des Jahres and Deutscher Spiele Preis
- 1999 Tikal (with Michael Kiesling) - winner, Spiel des Jahres and Deutscher Spiele Preis
- 1999 Torres (with Michael Kiesling) - winner, Spiel des Jahres; 2nd place, Deutscher Spiele Preis
- 2000 Princes of Florence (with Richard Ulrich) - 3rd place, Deutscher Spiele Preis
- 2002 Mexica (with Michael Kiesling)
- 2004 Maharaja: The Game of Palace Building in India (with Michael Kiesling) - Spiel des Jahres Nominee
- 2007 Colosseum (with Marcus Lubke)
- 2012 The Palaces of Carrara (with Michael Kiesling) - Kennerspiel des Jahres Nominee
- 2014 Abluxxen (with Michael Kiesling)
- 2015 Adventure Land (with Michael Kiesling)
- 2017 Downforce (with Rob Daviau & Justin D. Jacobson)
- 2020 Renature (with Michael Kiesling)
- 2022 Wandering Towers (with Michael Kiesling)
