= Ravensburger =

German game, toy and jigsaw puzzle company

Ravensburger AG
- Logo used since 1999

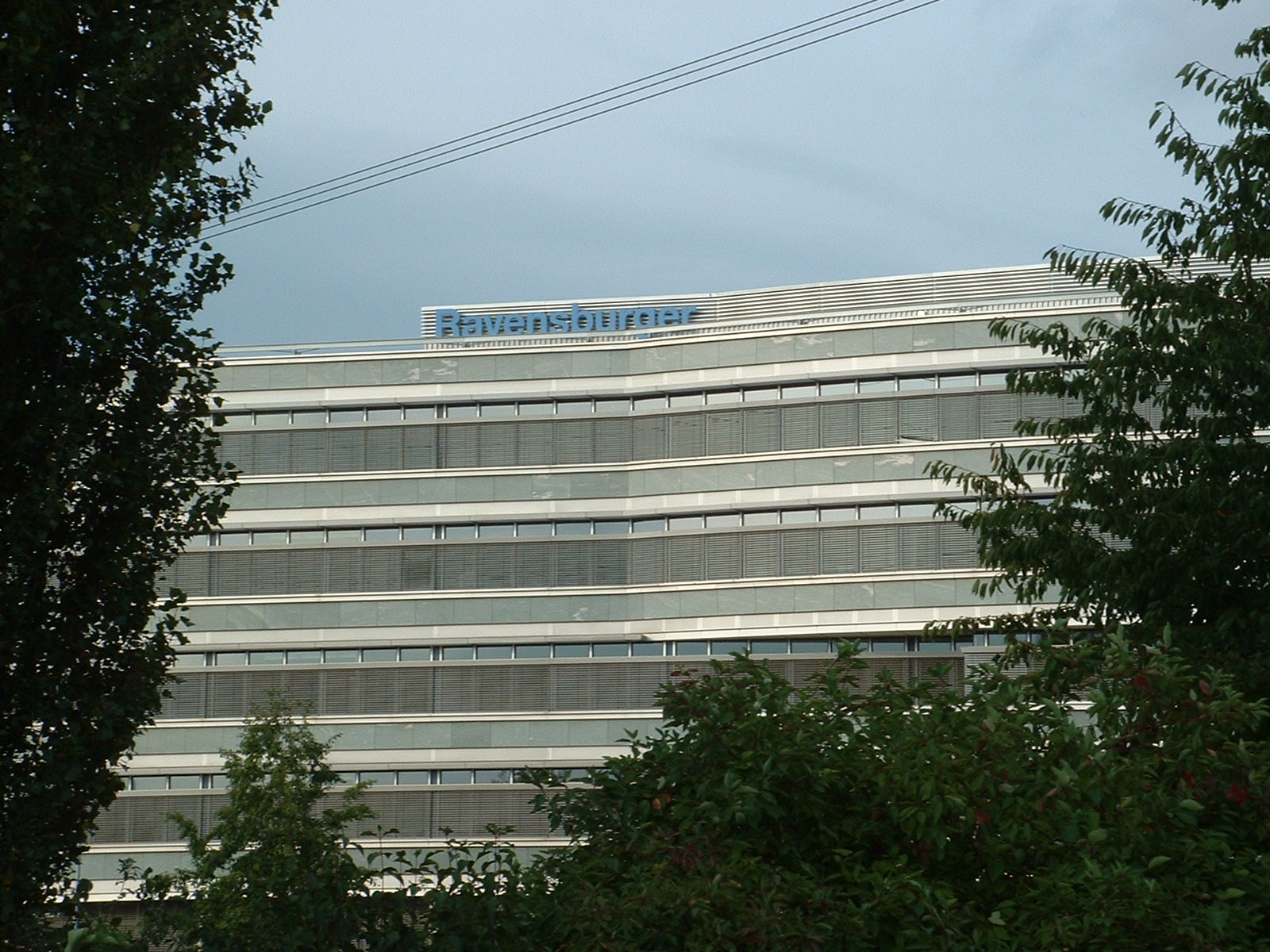
- Ravensburger headquarters
- Type: Aktiengesellschaft
- Industry: Puzzle, toy
- Founded: 7 May 1883; 143 years ago
- Headquarters: Ravensburg, Germany
- Area served: Worldwide
- Owner: Maier family, private company
- Website: www.ravensburger.com

Ravensburger AG is a German game, puzzle and toy company, publishing house, and market leader in the jigsaw puzzle market. The company was established in 1883 by Otto Robert Maier in Ravensburg, Germany. In its over 140 years of existence, the company has expanded internationally and acquired other toy companies such as BRIO and Wonder Forge.

== History ==
The company was founded by Otto Robert Maier in Ravensburg, a town in Upper Swabia in southern Germany. He began publishing in 1883 with his first author contract. He started publishing instruction folders for craftsmen and architects, which soon acquired him a solid financial basis. His first board game appeared in 1884, named Journey Around the World.

At the turn of the 20th century, his product line broadened to include picture books, books, children’s activity books, art instruction manuals, non-fiction books, and reference books as well as children’s games, Happy Families, and activity kits. In 1900, the Ravensburger blue triangle trademark was registered with the Imperial patent office. As of 1912, many board and activity games had an export version that was distributed to Western Europe and the countries of the Danube Monarchy as well as Russia.

Before the First World War, Ravensburger had around 800 products. The publishing house was damaged during the Second World War but continued to produce games in the years of the reconstruction. The company focused on children's games and books and specialized books for art, architecture, and hobbies, and from 1962 grew strongly. The company started to produce jigsaw puzzle games in 1964, and in the same year opened subsidiaries in Austria, France, Italy, the Netherlands, Switzerland and the United Kingdom. In 1977, the company split into a book publishing arm and a game publishing arm.

Today there are approximately 1800 available books and 850 games as well as puzzles, hobby products, and CD-ROM titles at Ravensburger and its subsidiaries, which include Alea for "hobby and ardent game players" and F.X. Schmid for games, playing cards and children's books. Ravensburger products are exported to more than fifty countries.

Under the label F.X. Schmid, Ravensburger produces one of the only two packs of true Tarock cards in Germany: a 54-card pack of the Bourgeois Tarot pattern with genre scenes and used for playing the game of Cego, popular in the Black Forest region.

In September 2010, Ravensburger broke the world record for the largest jigsaw puzzle, with one designed by late pop artist Keith Haring titled "Keith Haring: Double Retrospect". Built from 32,256 pieces, it measured 17' × 6' (5.18 m x 1.82 m) and came with a hand truck for transportation. Ravensburger has since released larger puzzles, with their largest being "Memorable Disney Moments" and "Making Mickey Magic" having 40,320 pieces each, however they have also since lost the world record to a 51,300 piece puzzle released by Kodak.

Swedish toy train company BRIO was acquired by the Ravensburger Group on 8 January 2015. In 2017, Ravensburger acquired American game company Wonder Forge.

The company's North American division, Ravensburger NA, is based in Seattle, Washington and releases approximately 25 games per year, the most successfully of which so far is Villainous, based on various Disney properties. Ravensburger NA sold about 3 million copies of games in 2018.

In June 2026, Ravensburger acquired a majority stake in toy company Steiff.

== Media subsidiaries ==
=== Ravensburger Interactive Media ===
Ravensburger Interactive Media GmbH was a video game and software subsidiary of Ravensburger which published and distributed various games in Germany. The company had two brands; Ravensburger Interactive, which published family-friendly games and educational software, and Fishtank Interactive, which published games for mature players.

In May 2002, Ravensburger Interactive was sold with Fishtank Interactive to JoWooD Productions.

=== Ravensburger Film + TV/RTV Family Entertainment ===
Ravensburger Film + TV GmbH is a former motion picture and television subsidiary of Ravensburger.

In late 1998, Ravensburger split off Ravensburger Film + TV as a separately operated company and was renamed to RTV Family Entertainment AG. Ravensburger remained a shareholder in RTV, holding 90% of its shares, and continued to license the "Ravensburger" brand. The company launched a Ravensburger TV block on Super RTL in June 2001.

In 2005, Ravensburger sold all their shares in the business, and in mid-2006, the company rebranded as Your Family Entertainment AG.

== Notable games ==
Games sold under the Ravensburger imprint:

- Backstreet Boys: Puzzles in Motion
- Das Buch von LuLu
- Dingbats
- Disney Lorcana
- Das Erbe des Maloney (Maloney's Inheritance)
- Emoji
- Enchanted Forest
- Havannah
- Horrified
- Java
- Journey through Europe
- Karawane
- Know Interactive Board Game
- Labyrinth (board game)
- Lotus
- Make 'n' Break
- Malefiz
- Mexica
- The Name of the Rose (2008)
- Nobody is Perfect
- Quest
- Reversi
- Rivers, Roads & Rails
- Scotland Yard
- Tactil
- Take It Easy
- Tikal
- Top Secret Spies
- Villainous
- What Do You Hear?

Games sold under the Alea label:

- Broom Service
- Castles of Burgundy
- Chinatown
- Las Vegas
- Princes of Florence
- Puerto Rico
- Ra
- San Juan

Games sold under the F.X. Schmid label:

- Auf Achse
- Torres
- Black Forest Cego playing cards

Games sold under the Ravensburger Digital label:

- Concentration in various editions
