= List of board game designers =

A game designer is a person who invents games at the conceptual level. Outstanding board game designers are recognized annually by awards such as the Spiel des Jahres and the As d'Or. The Academy of Adventure Gaming Arts & Design, a division of the Game Manufacturers Association, inducts outstanding individuals into the Hall of Fame.

The Origins Awards are presented by Game Manufacturers Association for outstanding work in the tabletop gaming industry. The Charles S. Roberts Award and the Charles Roberts Awards Hall of Fame recognize excellence in manual, tabletop games, with a focus on conflict simulations. Mensa Select is an annual award given by American Mensa to five board games that are "original, challenging and well designed".

The following is a list of notable board game designers. Role-playing games are not included in this list, but can be found in Role playing game designers.

Designer	Notable games	Honors	Ref.
Scott Abbott	Trivial Pursuit		
Robert Abbott	Baroque chess (aka Ultima), Crossings, and Epaminondas		
F. O. Alexander	Monopoly		
Ted Alspach	Suburbia and Werewords	Mensa Select	
Robert Angel	Pictionary		
Richard Baker	Axis & Allies Miniatures and Axis & Allies Naval Miniatures: War at Sea		
Rich Banner	Europa		
Antoine Bauza	7 Wonders, Mia London, Ghost Stories, and Takenoko	Kennerspiel des Jahres	
Antoine Bauza	7 Wonders, Mia London, Ghost Stories, and Takenoko	Deutscher Spiele Preis	
Antoine Bauza	7 Wonders, Mia London, Ghost Stories, and Takenoko	As d'Or Jeu de l'Année	
Michael Bennighof	U.S. Navy Plan Orange, Celtic Age, Panzer Grenadier, and Great War at Sea	Origins Award (3)	
Richard Berg	War of the Ring and The Campaign for North Africa and Gondor: The Siege of Minas Tirith	Hall of Fame	
Brian Blume	Panzer Warfare and Warriors of Mars		
Christophe Boelinger	Dungeon Twister		
Ty Bomba	When Dragons Fight and The Sedan Campaign of 1870: An Analysis	Charles S. Roberts Award (2)	
Ty Bomba	When Dragons Fight and The Sedan Campaign of 1870: An Analysis	Charles Roberts Awards Hall of Fame	
Rob Bontenbal	Um Reifenbreite	Spiel des Jahres	
Richard Borg	Call my Bluff	Spiel des Jahres	
Milton Bradley	The Checkered Game of Life (aka The Game of Life)		
Darwin Bromley	Empire Builder	Hall of Fame	
James Cooke Brown	Careers		
Rich Burlew	The Order of the Stick Adventure Game: The Dungeon of Dorukan		
Kris Burm	GIPF, ZÈRTZ, DVONN, TAMSK, YINSH, and PÜNCT	Mensa Select (3)	
Alfred Mosher Butts	Scrabble		
Allan B. Calhamer	Diplomacy		
Mike Carr	Fight in the Skies and Don't Give Up the Ship		
Bruno Cathala	Kingdomino, Shadows Over Camelot, and Five Tribes	Hall of Fame	
Bruno Cathala	Kingdomino, Shadows Over Camelot, and Five Tribes	Spiel des Jahres (2)	
Frank Chadwick	Europa	Hall of Fame	
Coleman Charlton	The Lonely Mountain		
Banana Chan	Betrayal at House on the Hill 3rd edition		
Robert N. Charrette	Bushido and BattleTech	Hall of Fame	
Vlaada Chvátil	Codenames, Space Alert, and Through the Ages: A Story of Civilization	Hall of Fame	
Vlaada Chvátil	Codenames, Space Alert, and Through the Ages: A Story of Civilization	Spiel des Jahres (2)	
Naomi Clark	Consentacle	IndieCade Impact Award	
Stephen V. Cole	Starfire, Asteroid Zero-Four, Cerberus, Valkenburg Castle, and Star Fleet Battles		
Leo Colovini	Clans, Cartagena, and Inkognito	Hall of Fame	
Miles Copeland Jr.	The Game of Nations		
Liz Danforth	Middle-earth Strategy Battle Game	Hall of Fame	
Charles Darrow	Monopoly		
Rob Daviau	Pandemic Legacy - Season 1, Axis & Allies: Pacific, Risk 2210 A.D., Betrayal at House on the Hill, Heroscape Master Set: Rise of the Valkyrie, Return to Dark Tower, SeaFall, and Risk Legacy	As d'Or Grand Prix	
Franz-Benno Delonge	TransAmerica and Fjords	Spiel des Jahres	
Franz-Benno Delonge	TransAmerica and Fjords	Mensa Select	
Marco Donadoni	Zargo's Lords, Iliad, Magic Wood, and Ra: Strategy Among Hexagons	Spiel des Jahres	
Rüdiger Dorn	Dragonheart, Istanbul, Luxor, Los Mampfos, and Karuba	Spiel des Jahres	
Jim Dunnigan	PanzerBlitz, The American Civil War: 1861–1865, The Ardennes Offiensive, Barbarossa: The Russo-German War 1941–45, 'CA': Tactical Naval Warfare in the Pacific 1941–43, Desert War: Tactical Warfare in North Africa, Destruction of Army Group Center, The East is Red: The Sino Soviet War, El Alamein: Battles in North Africa, 1942, Empires of the Middle Ages, The Fast Carriers, Firefight: Modern U.S. and Soviet Small Unit Tactics, Foxbat & Phantom, Fulda Gap, The Game of France, 1940, The Great War in the East, Invasion America, Jutland, Kursk: Operation Zitadelle, Leipzig: The Battle of Nations, Napoleon at Waterloo, Outdoor Survival, Panzergruppe Guderian, Wacht am Rhein	Hall of Fame	
Jim Dunnigan		Charles Roberts Awards Hall of Fame	
James Ernest	Kill Doctor Lucky and Tak	Hall of Fame	
Bruno Faidutti	Mystery of the Abbey	Spiel des Jahres	
Stefan Feld	The Castles of Burgundy, Trajan, and Civolution	Hall of Fame	
Stefan Feld	The Castles of Burgundy, Trajan, and Civolution	As d'Or Grand Prix	
Mary Flanagan	Pox: Save the People, Zombiepox, Buffalo (card game), Awkward Moment, and Grow-A-Game	Meaningful Play's Best Non-Digital Game Award	
Mary Flanagan	Pox: Save the People, Zombiepox, Buffalo (card game), Awkward Moment, and Grow-A-Game	Major Fun Award for Cooperation Thinking	
Matt Forbeck	Genestealer, Warzone, and The Great Rail Wars	Origins Awards (3)	
Friedemann Friese	Power Grid and Fearsome Floors		
Mac Gerdts	Imperial, Concordia, and Antike	Hall of Fame	
Suzanne Goldberg	Sherlock Holmes: Consulting Detective	Spiel des Jahres	
Donald Green	OCTI		
Allen Hammack	Viking Gods		
Chris Haney	Trivial Pursuit		
Daryl Hannah	Love It or Hate It and LIEbrary		
Elizabeth Hargrave	Wingspan	Spiel des Jahres	
David A. Hargrave	Arduin and The Arduin Adventure		
Jeb Havens	Uk'otoa		
Andria Hayday	DragonStrike		
Rob Heinsoo	Dreamblade and Castle Ravenloft	Origins Award	
Arnold Hendrick	Crypt of the Sorcerer, Barbarian Prince, Demonlord, Star Viking, and Grav Armor		
Dirk Henn	Alhambra, Metro, and Wallenstein	Spiel des Jahres	
Dirk Henn	Alhambra, Metro, and Wallenstein	Mensa Select	
Ephraim Hertzano	Rummikub	Spiel des Jahres	
John Hill	Squad Leader and Johnny Reb	Hall of Fame	
Maureen Hiron	Continuo	Hall of Fame	
Maureen Hiron	Continuo	Mensa Select	
Jeremy Holcomb	The Duke	Mensa Select	
Steve Jackson	Ogre and Car Wars	Hall of Fame	
Jennell Jaquays	Dark Tower	Hall of Fame	
John Jefferys	A Journey Through Europe		
Tom Jolly	Cargo, Diskwars, and G.O.O.T.M.U.		
Jervis Johnson	Blood Bowl, Epic 40,000, Necromunda, and Age of Sigmar		
Philippe Keyaerts	Evo, Vinci, and Olympos	As d'Or Grand Prix	
Michael Kiesling	Azul, Asara, The Palaces of Carrara, Heaven & Ale, and Tikal	Spiel des Jahres (2)	
Michael Kiesling	Azul, Asara, The Palaces of Carrara, Heaven & Ale, and Tikal	As d'Or Jeu de l'Année	
Michael Kiesling	Azul, Asara, The Palaces of Carrara, Heaven & Ale, and Tikal	Mensa Select	
Reiner Knizia	Ra, Modern Art, Samurai, Ribbit, FITS, Keltis, Mmm!, L.A.M.A. (L.L.A.M.A.), Ingenious, My City, and The Lord of the Rings	Spiel des Jahres	
Reiner Knizia	Ra, Modern Art, Samurai, Ribbit, FITS, Keltis, Mmm!, L.A.M.A. (L.L.A.M.A.), Ingenious, My City, and The Lord of the Rings	Hall of Fame	
Reiner Knizia	Ra, Modern Art, Samurai, Ribbit, FITS, Keltis, Mmm!, L.A.M.A. (L.L.A.M.A.), Ingenious, My City, and The Lord of the Rings	Kinderspiel des Jahres	
Reiner Knizia	Ra, Modern Art, Samurai, Ribbit, FITS, Keltis, Mmm!, L.A.M.A. (L.L.A.M.A.), Ingenious, My City, and The Lord of the Rings	Mensa Select	
John Kovalic	Dork Tower	Hall of Fame	
Wolfgang Kramer	El Grande, Java, Mexica, Tikal, The Princes of Florence, Blox, Asara, The Palaces of Carrara, Auf Achse, Top Secret Spies, Princes of Florence, and Torres	Hall of Fame	
Wolfgang Kramer	El Grande, Java, Mexica, Tikal, The Princes of Florence, Blox, Asara, The Palaces of Carrara, Auf Achse, Top Secret Spies, Princes of Florence, and Torres	Spiel des Jahres (5)	
Wolfgang Kramer	El Grande, Java, Mexica, Tikal, The Princes of Florence, Blox, Asara, The Palaces of Carrara, Auf Achse, Top Secret Spies, Princes of Florence, and Torres	As d'Or Prix du Jury	
Robert J. Kuntz	Kings & Things and Lankhmar	Charles S. Roberts Award	
Vital Lacerda	The Gallerist		
Albert Lamorisse	Risk		
Eric M. Lang	Blood Rage, Rising Sun, XCOM: The Board Game, and Chaos in the Old World	Hall of Fame	
Eric M. Lang	Blood Rage, Rising Sun, XCOM: The Board Game, and Chaos in the Old World	Diana Jones Award	
Serge Laget	Shadows over Camelot and Du Balai!	Spiel des Jahres	
Serge Laget	Shadows over Camelot and Du Balai!	As d'Or Jeu de l'Année	
Ryan Laukat	Above and Below and Near and Far		
Matt Leacock	Pandemic, Roll Through the Ages: The Bronze Age, Pandemic Legacy - Season 1, Daybreak , and Pandemic Legacy: Season 2, Forbidden Island	As d'Or Grand Prix	
Matt Leacock	Pandemic, Roll Through the Ages: The Bronze Age, Pandemic Legacy - Season 1, Daybreak , and Pandemic Legacy: Season 2, Forbidden Island	Spiel des Jahres	
Matt Leacock	Pandemic, Roll Through the Ages: The Bronze Age, Pandemic Legacy - Season 1, Daybreak , and Pandemic Legacy: Season 2, Forbidden Island	Hall of Fame	
Matt Leacock	Pandemic, Roll Through the Ages: The Bronze Age, Pandemic Legacy - Season 1, Daybreak , and Pandemic Legacy: Season 2, Forbidden Island	Mensa Select	
Matt Leacock	Pandemic, Roll Through the Ages: The Bronze Age, Pandemic Legacy - Season 1, Daybreak , and Pandemic Legacy: Season 2, Forbidden Island	Diana Jones Award	
Tom Lehmann	To Court the King	As d'Or Grand Prix	
Ted Leonsis	Only In New York		
Sam Lewis	Dragonriders of Pern, BattleTroops, Renegade Legion, and Classic BattleTech		
Paul Lidberg	A Line in the Sand		
Edwin S. Lowe	Yahtzee and BINGO!		
Lizzie Magie	The Landlord's Game		
Gérard Mathieu	Supergang	Super As d'Or	
Mike Mearls	Castle Ravenloft		
Samaira Mehta	Coder Bunnyz		
Tom Meier	Thunderbolt Mountain	Hall of Fame	
Heinz Meister	Karambolage, Bärenstark, and Burg Schlummerschatz	Kinderspiel des Jahres	
Michael Menzel	Andor, Legends of Andor, The Adventures of Robin Hood, Shogun, Thurn and Taxis, Stone Age, Havana, and Catan	Spiel des Jahres	
Michael Menzel	Andor, Legends of Andor, The Adventures of Robin Hood, Shogun, Thurn and Taxis, Stone Age, Havana, and Catan	As d'Or Jeu de l'Année	
Marc Miller	Double Star	Hall of Fame	
Joseph Miranda	Renaissance of Infantry		
George Howard Monks	Halma and Basilinda		
Alan R. Moon (aka Rebecca Sean Borgstrom and R. Sean Borgstrom)	Elfenland and Ticket to Ride	Spiel des Jahres (2)	
Alan R. Moon (aka Rebecca Sean Borgstrom and R. Sean Borgstrom)	Elfenland and Ticket to Ride	Hall of Fame	
Alan R. Moon (aka Rebecca Sean Borgstrom and R. Sean Borgstrom)	Elfenland and Ticket to Ride	Diana Jones Award	
Linda Mosca	Battle of the Wilderness: Gaining the Initiative, May 5-6, 1864; Rocroi; Gondor: The Siege of Minas Tirith; King Arthur; Chinese Farm; Terrible Swift Sword; and Russian Civil War 1918–1922		
Abraham Nathanson	Bananagrams		
Douglas Niles	A Line in the Sand		
Greg Novak	Guilford Courthouse		
Philip Orbanes	Monopoly: The Mega Edition		
David Parlett	Hare and Tortoise	Spiel des Jahres	
Celia Pearce	Candy Crusher		
Christian T. Petersen	Twilight Imperium, A Game of Thrones, and World of Warcraft: The Board Game		
Alexander Pfister	Broom Service, Great Western Trail, and Isle of Skye	Kinderspiel des Jahres (2)	
Lawrence Pinsky	Blitzkrieg		
Lewis Pulsipher	Valley of the Four Winds, Dragon Rage, Swords & Wizardry, and Britannia	ENNIE	
Jack Radey	Kanev: Parachutes Across the Dnepr and Korsun Pocket: Little Stalingrad on the Dnepr – January 25th to February 17th, 1944		
Paul Randles	Pirate's Cove and Key Largo		
Alex Randolph	Enchanted Forest, Inkognito, Ricochet Robots, Gute Freunde (Good Friends), and Oh-Wah-Ree	Kinderspiel des Jahres (2)	
Alex Randolph	Enchanted Forest, Inkognito, Ricochet Robots, Gute Freunde (Good Friends), and Oh-Wah-Ree	Hall of Fame	
David J. Ritchie	Arena of Death, Attack Force, Barbarossa, and Lost Victory		
Charles S. Roberts	Tactics II	Hall of Fame	
Laura Robinson	Balderdash		
Uwe Rosenberg	Agricola and Nova Luna	Spiel des Jahres	
Uwe Rosenberg	Agricola and Nova Luna	Hall of Fame	
Alex Randolph	Gute Freunde (Good Friends), TwixT, Breakthru, Hol's der Geier, Inkognito, Ricochet Robot, and Enchanted Forest	Kinderspiel des Jahres	
Alex Randolph	Gute Freunde (Good Friends), TwixT, Breakthru, Hol's der Geier, Inkognito, Ricochet Robot, and Enchanted Forest	Hall of Fame	
Sid Sackson	Acquire, Can't Stop, Focus, and I'm the Boss!	Hall of Fame	
Sid Sackson	Acquire, Can't Stop, Focus, and I'm the Boss!	Spiel des Jahres	
John Scarne	Teeko		
Michael Schacht	Zooloretto	Spiel des Jahres	
Craige Schensted	*Star, Star, and Y		
Roger Schlaifer	Odds’R: The Odds On Everything Game		
Leslie Scott	Jenga and Ex Libris		
Duke Seifried	military and fantasy miniatures for wargames and fantasy role-playing games	Hall of Fame	
Mike Selinker	Pirates of the Spanish Main, Axis & Allies: D-Day, Betrayal at House on the Hill, Risk Godstorm, and Stonehenge	Origins Awards (3)	
Andreas Seyfarth	Manhattan, Thurn and Taxis, and Puerto Rico	Spiel des Jahres (2)	
Bruce Shelley	1830: The Game of Railroads and Robber Barons		
Hilary Shepard	Love It or Hate It and LIEbrary		
Redmond Simonsen	After the Holocaust; Arena of Death; Bastogne: The Desperate Defense, December 1944; The Battle of Nations; Battlefleet Mars;Breakout & Pursuit: The Battle for France, 1944; Cemetery Hill; Chickamauga: The Last Victory, 20 September 1863; Desert War: Tactical Warfare in North Africa; and Dragonslayer	Hall of Fame	
David Sirlin	Puzzle Strike: Bag of Chips		
Lester W. Smith	Minion Hunter and Temple of the Beastmen		
Daniel Stahl	Pirate's Cove		
Jamey Stegmaier	Scythe	As d'Or Grand Prix	
Jerry Taylor	Hammer of the Scots and Crusader Rex		
Bernard Tavitian	Blokus	Super As d'Or	
Klaus Teuber	Catan, Hoity Toity, Entdecker (Discoverer), Drunter und Drüber (Under and Over), Catan, Spinnengift und Krötenschleim (Spider Venom and Toad Slime), Barbarossa, and Löwenherz (Lionheart)	Hall of Fame	
Klaus Teuber	Catan, Hoity Toity, Entdecker (Discoverer), Drunter und Drüber (Under and Over), Catan, Spinnengift und Krötenschleim (Spider Venom and Toad Slime), Barbarossa, and Löwenherz (Lionheart)	Spiel des Jahres (4)	
David A. Trampier	Titan	Hall of Fame	
Ignacy Trzewiczek	Robinson Crusoe: Adventures on the Cursed Island	Hall of Fame	
Richard Ulrich	El Grande and Princes of Florence	Spiel des Jahres	
Richard Ulrich	El Grande and Princes of Florence	As d'Or Prix du Jury	
Donald X. Vaccarino	Kingdom Builder	Spiel des Jahres	
Dan Verssen	7th Sea	Charles S. Roberts Award	
Martin Wallace	Railways of the World and Age of Steam		
Tim Walsh	TriBond	Mensa Select	
David G. Watts	Railway Rivals	Spiel des Jahres	
Cole Wehrle	Root, Pax Pamir, Arcs, John Company, and Oath: Chronicles of Empire and Exile		
Margaret Weis	Dragonlance	Hall of Fame	
Jordan Weisman	BattleTech and Mage Knight	Hall of Fame	
Jordan Weisman	BattleTech and Mage Knight	Origins Award (2)	
David Wesely	Braunstein		
Tom Wham	The Awful Green Things from Outer Space		
Lynn Willis	Godsfire, Olympica, Holy War, and Lords of the Middle Sea		
Kevin Wilson	A Game of Thrones, Doom: The Boardgame, Descent: Journeys in the Dark, World of Warcraft: The Board Game, and Arkham Horror		
Loren Wiseman	Caesar's Legions	Hall of Fame	
Reinhold Wittig	Spiel, Wir füttern die kleinen Nilpferde (We Feed the Little Hippos), Kula Kula, and Doctor Faust	Hall of Fame	
Reinhold Wittig	Spiel, Wir füttern die kleinen Nilpferde (We Feed the Little Hippos), Kula Kula, and Doctor Faust	Spiel des Jahres (4)	
Christian Wolf	Tutankhamen and Klondik	Kinderspiel des Jahres	
Christian Wolf	Tutankhamen and Klondik	Super As d'Or	
Teeuwynn Woodruff	BattleTech, Dreamblade, and Betrayal at House on the Hill		
Klaus-Jürgen Wrede	Carcassonne	Spiel des Jahres	
Nob Yoshigahara	Rush Hour	Mensa Select	
Lou Zocchi	Zocchihedron die, Luftwaffe, The Battle of Britain, Alien Space, and Flying Tigers	Hall of Fame	

== See also ==
- Going Cardboard
- History of games
- List of game designers
- List of indie game developers
