= Jolly Roger: Treasure Islands =

Pirate-themed boardgame

Jolly Roger
- Designers: Marco Donadoni
- Publishers: International Team
- Publication: 1979
- Genres: Age of Sail

Jolly Roger is a family boardgame published by the Italian company International Team (IT) in 1979 in which players use pirate ships to collect treasure.

== Description ==
Jolly Roger is a game for 2 to 6 players in which players try to collect treasure and return it to their home port.

=== Components ===
The mounted map, marked with a 23x23 square grid, is put together as four interlocking pieces. Sixteen islands are marked on the perimeter, and six ports are at the centre of the map. Six irregularly-shaped "storm areas", numbered 1 to 6, are also marked on the map. A wind disk marks the direction of the wind.

=== Set-up ===
Each player is given colour-coded counters for their pirate ship and frigate, and each is given one of the home ports at the centre of the map. The players agree on the number of treasure chests required to win the game.

=== Gameplay ===
==== Wind and movement ====
The direction of the win is dictated by the wind disk. Each player on their turn chooses the direction in which their ship will move, and then must move their ship in a straight line (which can be diagonal), at a speed indicated by the combination of the wind's direction and the ship's course:

- With the wind directly behind: 4
- Diagonally with the wind: 5
- Perpendicular to the wind: 3
- Diagonally against the wind: 2
- Directly against the wind: 1

Every three turns, the wind changes direction according to the wind disk.

Each ship must move its full speed as dictated by the wind. The ship can only discard extra movement if it enters an outer island harbour or its own home harbour. If a ship runs into land, it sinks, losing any treasure it had on board. (The ship is returned to the player's home base.) The map "wraps" from side to side, so a ship sailing off one edge reappears on the opposite edge.

==== Storms ====
The first player rolls two die and marks the two corresponding numbered storm areas. These areas now have a storm blowing in them, so ships cannot enter, and any ship caught in the storm cannot move.

==== Treasure ====
When a pirate ship enters an outer island's harbour, the pirate is awarded with a treasure chest from the game treasury. Each pirate ship can carry up to three chests. The treasure chests do not count towards a player's victory unless they are returned to the player's home base.

==== Frigates ====
Each player also has a navy frigate. If the frigate intercepts another player's pirate ship and runs over it, the pirate ship is sunk (returned to the owning player's home base), and any treasure on the pirate ship is returned to the treasury. Frigates cannot dock in any harbour.

=== Victory conditions ===
The first player to return the agreed upon number of treasure chests to their home base is the winner.

== Publication history ==
In 1979, the Italian game company IT produced a number of board games with rules in Italian, German, French and English. These included Conquistadores, Gipso, Magic Wood, Medici, Ra, Tabu and Jolly Roger. The latter was designed by Marco Donadoni. Its high production values and laminated counters presaged high-quality Eurogames of the 1980s.

Unfortunately the English translation was not very good — "The gallions transport the douboolns of the Banco de Espana to the islands, but the change of winds, sudden storms or opponent pirate ships can make any attempt vain." — leading to problems in understanding the rules. As critic Tim Kask noted, "the translations are lousy ... Most of the rules are simple enough that good common sense is usually sufficient to slog through the sticky portions. Unfortunately, some of the errors require divine inspiration and/or revelation to interpret."

== Reception ==
In Issue 38 of Dragon (March 1980), Tim Kask thought the components were of "exceptional quality" and noted, "Jolly Roger has few counters, and an average-size board, and only a few pages of rules ... Do not let the seeming simplicity deceive you; this appears to be a fascinating game of the highest order." Kask concluded, "Compared to some of the $30+ dinosaurs available today that demand that the players be experts in the field to even understand them, [this game is] much more dollar-efficient. You do not have to read two or three rule books, nor spend needless hours preparing to play. Definitely worth looking into."

In Issue 14 of Simulacrum,Joe Scoleri commented, "While some of the International Team games could be categorized as wargames, Jolly Roger is clearly a family strategy style game." Scoleri also noted that the high quality of the components offered another area of play: "even if you are dissatisfied with the oddly phrased IT rules, Jolly Roger offers a great looking set of components for putting together your own lighthearted pirate game."
