= Korsun =

Korsun may refer to:

Places

- Korsun, Slavic name for the ancient Greek colony of Chersonesos Taurica in Crimea
- a name of Korsun-Shevchenkivskyi, Ukraine before 1944
- Korsun, Donetsk Oblast, an urban-type settlement in Donetsk Oblast, Ukraine
- Korsun-Shevchenkivskyi Raion, former raion (district) of Cherkasy Oblast in Ukraine

Other

- Korsun (surname)
- Battle of Korsun, in 1648 during the Khmelnytsky Uprising
- Battle of Korsun–Cherkassy between Nazi Germany and Soviet Union in 1944 during World War II
- Decisive Battles of WWII: Korsun Pocket, a computer game based on the Battle of the Korsun-Cherkassy Pocket
- Joachim of Korsun, first bishop of Novgorod the Great
- Korsun Pocket: Little Stalingrad on the Dnepr, a board wargame based on the Battle of the Korsun-Cherkassy Pocket
- SS Korsun Shevtshenkovsky, cargo ship built in 1943
- Treaty of Korsun, 1657 treaty between the Cossack Hetmanate and Sweden
