= Zargo's Lords =

First fantasy wargame to be produced in Italy

Zargo's Lords, released in 1979, was one of the most popular wargames released by the Italian company International Team (IT). Designed by Marco Donadoni, the chief game designer at IT, Zargo's Lords was the first fantasy wargame to be produced in Italy, and was well received both in Italy and abroad. It sold well into the early 1980s and in some countries (including Italy) it was instrumental in letting wargames be known to a larger audience. Due to the success of the game, IT later released an expansion set; moreover, the fantasy setting created by IT for Zargo's Lords was later used in other, independent games. After Zargo's Lords, IT published several other fantasy wargames, including Wohrom and Idro.

== General description ==
As with most of Donadoni's games, Zargo's Lords is a hex map-based wargame. It is intended for 2–4 players. The game, as was usually the case with IT productions, is characterized by sophisticated graphics (by artist Enea Riboldi) and good quality materials.

The large map of the game depicts the four continents of the fantasy world of Zargo. These are inhabited by four factions: the "Knights", the "Monks", the "Winged men", and the "Dragons". Every faction has different units with different features; for example, the knights mostly rely on brute force, while monks have magic powers (such as teleportation and the ability to cast spells), the dragons throw flames at distant targets, and Winged units can fly over mountains and other obstacles. At game setup, each faction controls a continent, as well as four cities, that are placed by the player using that faction. The objective of the game is to conquer enemy cities.

== Related games and influence ==
In 1983 IT released Zargo's Lords II, an expansion set (described at the time as a "gamette") with two additional factions, the "Amazons" and the "Arachnids", as well as updated and revised rules. Another independent game from IT, Blue Stones (1987), was later set in the world of Zargo. After IT went bankrupt (in 1988), another company, Eurogames, acquired most IT material and produced a series of game that largely relied on IT earlier projects; one of these was a Risk-like game based on the same fantasy setting as Zargo's Lords and entitled Zargos (1989). Angelo Porazzi, designer of the Warangel wargame, has often mentioned Zargo's Lords as one of the main influences on his own work.

== Reception ==
Elisabeth Barrington reviewed Zargo's Lords in The Space Gamer No. 31. Barrington commented that "If you don't mind slight difficulties in moving pieces, finding rules, and sorting through four CRTs, this is a fun game. The background is a familiar one, but the scenario is novel in some ways and uses some interesting ideas. Though not at the top, I place Zargo's Lords above average."

== Reviews ==
- Tilt
