= Inkognito =

Board game

- Players: 3-5
- Skills: Deduction

Inkognito is a board game for 3 to 5 players designed by Alex Randolph and Leo Colovini, first published in 1988 by Milton Bradley Company. It has since been republished several times including by the company Venice Connection established by the designers and Dario De Toffoli.

The game was inspired by the Italian card game Briscola Chiamata.

== Play overview ==
Inkognito is a spy game set in Venice. It is unique in that the players play in pairs, but no player knows who their partner is. Each player has half of a secret message detailing their party's mission; their partner is the player with the other half. In order to win, a player must:

- figure out who their partner really is
- get the other half of the secret message from their partner
- discover their party's mission
- complete the mission

With 5 players, one player plays as the ambassador, who wins if he can perfectly identify all the other players.

== Awards ==
In 1988 this game won the Spiel des Jahres special award for most beautiful game.

== Reviews ==
- Jeux & Stratégie #57 (as "Intrigues à Venise")
