= Roma (game) =

Roma is a 1986 board game published by International Team.

== Gameplay ==
Roma is a game in which a strategic game is set in the ancient Mediterranean, featuring land and sea units, diplomacy, and optional simultaneous movement rules.

== Reviews ==
- Casus Belli #37
- Jeux & Stratégie #43
