= International Team =

Italian game company

International Team (IT) was an Italian game company founded in the 1970s and active until the early 1980s. While the company started as a jigsaw puzzle producer, it is mostly remembered as a wargame company, a business that IT approached in 1979 after game designer Marco Donadoni joined in.

IT was the first Italian wargame company and its most successful games, such as Zargo's Lords, were instrumental in introducing the wargame culture in Italy. IT games were translated in other languages (mostly French, German and English) and exported abroad. At the peak of IT's popularity, foreign branches of the company were founded, such as International Team France (established in 1979). Besides wargames, IT also published a few roleplaying games (such as Legio VII and Magikon) and ordinary board games.

The company went bankrupt in 1988. Some of their assets were acquired by the French company Eurogames, that later published a few games based on designs and materials by IT, such as Colonizer based on IT's Kroll & Prumni and Zargos based on Zargo's Lords.

== Published games ==
Title	Year	Author	Languages	Description	Difficulty Lvl	Code
Attila	1981		Ita, Eng, Fr, Ger	Recreating the Hun invasion of the Roman Empire	2	W114
Austerlitz	1981	Marco Donadoni	Ita, Eng, Fr, Ger	Recreating Napoleon's most famous victory at the Battle of three emperors	5	W116
Blue Stones	1987	Marco Donadoni	Ita, Fr, Ger	A Fantastic skirmish wargame set in the Zargo's Lords milieu. Wizards and Monks defend magic stones against three new evil races.	3	W123
Bonaparte	1982	Marco Donadoni	IEFG	A strategic Army Corps-level recreation of the Imperial Napoleonic saga. Possibly International Team's best effort	6	W119
Conquistadores	1979	Marco Donadoni	IEFG	Spanish conquistadores search for treasure in the New World		
East & West	1981	Marco Donadoni	Ita, Eng, Fr, Ger	A World War III strategic wargame divided in three different theaters: central Europe, Middle East and Sino-Soviet border (with China on West's side)	6	W111
Gipso	1981		Ita, Eng, Fr, Ger	Assemble four seasonal puzzles		
Idro	1980	Marco Donadoni	Ita, Eng, Fr, Ger	Fantasy wargame pitting rebelling mermen and mermaids against the crustacean oppressors 'Krost'	4	W110
Iliad	1979	Marco Donadoni	Ita, Eng, Fr, Ger	Basic re-enactment of the siege of Troy as narrated in Homer's poem	1	W104
Jena	1980	Marco Donadoni	Ita, Eng, Fr, Ger	The clash of the Napoleonic Grande Armée and the Prussian Army in 1806	4	W107
Jolly Roger: Treasure Islands	1979	Marco Donadoni	Ita, Eng, Fr, Ger	Pirate-themed game of looting treasure and sinking ship		
Kroll & Prumni	1979	Marco Donadoni	Ita, Eng, Fr, Ger	International Team's first wargaming effort, futuristic exploration and combat between two rival star empires	2	W101
Landsknecht	1987	Marco Donadoni	Ita, Fr, Ger	Tactical wargame in the European wars of religion	2-5	W124
Little Big Horn	1981?	Andrea Mannucci	Ita, Eng, Fr, Ger	Sitting Bull's day of glory against Custer	3	W115
Magic Wood	1979	Marco Donadoni	Ita, Eng, Fr, Ger	Battle for survival in the Magic Wood		
Millennium	1981	Giovanni Ingellis	Ita, Eng, Fr, Ger	A much-refined sci-fi wargame blending strategic and tactical aspects	4	W1117
Mockba	1984	Roberto Bonsi	Ita, Fr	Wehrmacht's do-or-die offensive against Moscow in December 1941	4	W122
Norge	1981	Marco Donadoni	Ita, Eng, Fr, Ger	Re-creating the fight for Norway in 1940	4	W118
Odyssey	1979	Marco Donadoni	Ita, Eng, Fr, Ger	In this game one player, acting as Athena tries to lead Ulysses back home in Ithaca while its adversary (playing Poseidon) must hinder and delay him	1	W106
Okinawa	1979	Marco Donadoni	Ita, Eng, Fr, Ger	Depicting the landing and conquest of Okinawa in World War II, complete with rules for bunkers, shore bombardments and kamikaze swarm attacks	3	W105
Roma	1986			A strategy game set in the ancient Mediterranean, featuring land and sea units, diplomacy, and advanced simultaneous movement rules		
Rommel	1981	Marco Donadoni	Ita, Eng, Fr, Ger	The u.s. army first defeat during the Tunisian campaign	5	W113
Sicilia '43	1981	Marco Donadoni	Ita, Eng, Fr, Ger	Operation Husky, the invasion of Sicily in late 1943	5	W109
Supermarina	1984	Umberto Tosi	Ita, Fr	Probably's International Team's most complex game, it re-created the duel between Regia Marina and Royal Navy between July and October 1940, an oft-forgotten topic in World War II wargames	8	W121
Waterloo	1980	Marco Donadoni	Ita, Eng, Fr, Ger	Recreating Napoleon's last battle 1815 against the combined forces of Wellington and Blucher	4	W108
Wohrom	1981	Marco Donadoni	Ita, Eng, Fr, Ger	A fantasy game uniting aspects of wargaming and RPG-adventure, with two clans of knights fighting for the vacant throne of the kingdom	4	W112
Yom Kippur	1984	Andrea Mannucci	Ita, Fr	Simulation of 1973 Ramadan War–Yom Kippur War	2/5	W120
York Town	1979	Marco Donadoni	Ita, Eng, Fr, Ger	Recreating one of the turning points of the u.s. rebellion in 1781	2	W102
Zargo's Lords	1979	Marco Donadoni	Ita, Eng, Fr, Ger	Italy's first fantasy game. It had four races (Knights, Winged Men, Dragons and Monks) vying for supremacy in the world of Zargo	3	W103
Zargo's Lords II	1983	Marco Donadoni	Ita, Eng, Fr, Ger	First Zargo's Lords expansion: adding Amazons and Arachnids as new races and rules' updates and errata	-	-

== Historical importance ==
While some of International Team's games were quite "typical" of their era and generally not on par with U.S. and British offerings (which benefitted from a more developed hobby and gaming culture) they saturated the Italian market (where in early 1980s fluent English readers were by no means common) and also enjoyed commercial success in France and Germany. Some of their best games were highly innovative, such as the non-strategic Napoleonic ones (Austerlitz, Jena, Waterloo), presenting a unique Octagons and Squares board, better suited to the Napoleonic infantry formations (square, line, column...). Some other, like 'Norge' and 'Supermarina' tackled topics and campaigns which seldom enjoyed dedicated boardgames.
