= Rules! =

2014 video game

- Developer: Marcel-André Casasola Merkle
- Publisher: TheCodingMonkeys
- Artists: Marcel-André Casasola Merkle; Agnes Lison
- Platforms: iOS, iPad, Apple Watch
- Release: August 6, 2014: iOS: August 6, 2014; iPad: August 20, 2014; Watch: April 24, 2015
- Genres: Educational, puzzle
- Mode: Single-player

Rules! is a 2014 educational puzzle video game co-developed by Marcel-André Casasola Merkle and Agnes Lison and published by TheCodingMonkeys. It was released for iOS in August 2014 and became the first game to be released on the Apple Watch in April 2015.

== Gameplay ==
In Rules!, the player must constantly solve puzzles within a limited amount of time by following rules.

The player is given a board made up of 16 tiles, which contain objects or animals and a number on the top-left corner. They are given a rule in each level, and for each level they complete, the player must recall past rules. For example, when a player finishes a rule for level four, they must follow the rules from level three, then two, and finally one. Players must solve each level within a limited amount of time. To fit the small size of the Apple Watch, the gameplay was reduced.

== Development and release ==
The graphics, according to designer Agnes Lison, were intended to be vector. Concepts for the icons were developed by Marcel-André Casasola Merkle. However, Lison thought it looked "flat" and opted for a mosaic-like look based on pictures on her wall.

Rules! released for iOS on August 6, 2014, and for the iPad on August 20, 2014. On April 24, 2015, Rules! became the first game to be released on the Apple Watch.

== Reception ==
Reception

Aggregate score
Aggregator	Score
Metacritic	88/100

Review scores
Publication	Score
IGN	9/10
TouchArcade	4.5/5

The game has a Metacritic rating of 88% based on 8 critic reviews.

Gamezebo wrote: "Rules! is that sort of lightning in a bottle that only comes along every so often. I'd rank it right up there with Threes!, and not just because both games so gleefully abuse exclamation points." IGN Italia said "Rules! is one of that game that you can't simply quit: it's amazing to look and to play, engaging and challenging, even brutal if your brain isn't trained enough. Follow the Rules has never looked so good." TouchArcade wrote "It's certainly worth checking out, but be warned: it might make you feel your age, even if you're not all that old." ArcadeSushi said "Rules! provides the unique experience of further developing hand-eye coordination and memory skills in each person who plays it, while giving the added bonus of plain-old having fun." Apple'N'Apps wrote "Rules! is an excellently crafted new puzzle idea that will no doubt get you to absolutely love following the rules." Pocket Gamer UK said "A delightfully constructed memory test that grows in complexity and appeal the deeper in you go." 148Apps compared the game to Simon Says, writing "Follow the rules to the letter in order to win in this simple yet tough memory game."

=== Awards ===
Rules! was selected as the "best game" in the App Store's Best of 2014 list.
