= Friedemann Friese =

German board game designer (born 1970)

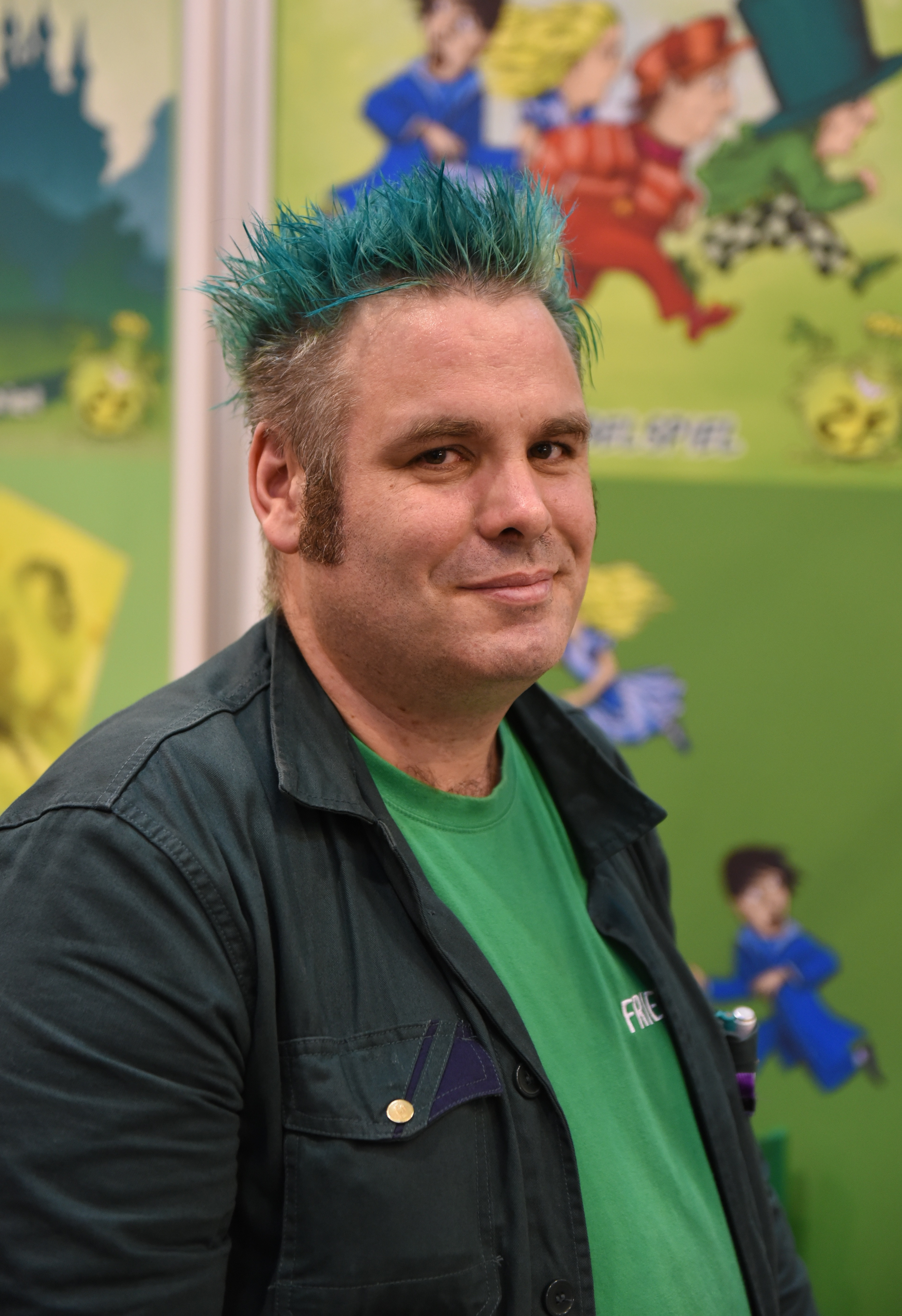
Friedemann Friese (2017)

Friedemann Friese (born June 5, 1970) is a German board game designer, known for absurd and humorous games. He is best known for the game Power Grid.

Friese lives and works in Bremen. He is known for absurd and humour-themed games. The majority, but not all, self-published by his company 2F-Spiele. Many of his games have titles beginning with the letter "F", including his most well known, Power Grid or Funkenschlag. Many of his games also feature artwork by the artist Harald Lieske.

The game Power Grid (2004) received an honourable mention at the 2005 Spiel des Jahres Awards.

== Games designed ==
- Free Ride
- Findorff (2F-Spiele, Rio Grande Games) (2022)
- Fertig! (also known as Finished!) (2F-Spiele) (2017)
- America (with Ted Alspach) (Bezier Games) (2016)
- 504 (Stronghold Games) (2015)
- Fremde Federn (also known as Copycat) (2F-Spiele) (2012)
- Freitag (also known as Friday) (2F-Spiele) (2011)
- Funkenschlag: Fabrikmanager (Power Grid: Factory Manager) (2F-Spiele) (2009)
- Die 3 Gebote (also known as The 3 Commandments) (with Gordon Lamont and Fraser Lamont) (Rio Grande Games, Bewitched) (2008)
- Fauna (Huch & Friends) (2008)
- Filou - Die Katze im Sack (also known as Felix: The Cat in the Sack) (2007)
- Monstermaler (with Marcel-André Casasola Merkle & Andrea Meyer) (2F-Spiele, Bewitched Spiele, Casasola) (2006)
- Fürchterliche Feinde (Formidable Foes) (2F-Spiele) (2006)
- Fiji (2F-Spiele) (2006)
- Fiese Freunde Fette Feten (with Marcel-André Casasola Merkle) (2F-Spiele) (2005)
- Funkenschlag (2F-Spiele) (also known as Power Grid - Rio Grande Games) (2004)
- Finstere Flure (Fearsome Floors) (2F-Spiele) (2003)
- Fische Fluppen Frikadellen (2F-Spiele)
- Falsche FuFFziger (2F-Spiele)
- Flickwerk (2F-Spiele)
- Foppen (2F-Spiele)
- Friesematenten (2F-Spiele)
- Frisch Fisch (2F-Spiele) (also known as Fresh Fish - Plenary Games)
- Frisch Fleisch (2F-Spiele)
- Fundstücke (2F-Spiele)
- Ludoviel (with Hartmut Kommerell, Thorsten Gimmler, Andrea Meyer & Martina Hellmich) (Tagungshaus Drübberholz)
- Paparazzo (with Wolfgang Panning) (Abacus)
- Schwarzarbeit (with Andrea Meyer) (Bewitched)
- Wucherer (2F-Spiele) (also known as LandLord - Abacus / Rio Grande Games)

== See also ==
- Going Cardboard (Documentary)
