= Marco Donadoni =

Italian game designer (born 1951)

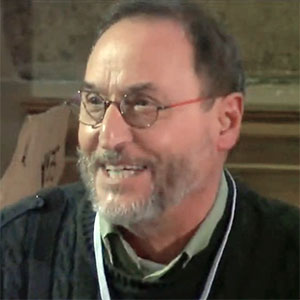
Marco Donadoni

Marco Alberto Donadoni (born in Milan, 8 November 1951) is an Italian game designer. He designed his first, self-produced wargame, Iliad, in 1977; he then joined the Italian company International Team (IT), that at the time was mainly a jigsaw puzzle producer. IT published Iliad and changed its core business, focusing on the wargame market, with Donadoni being its main game designer. Between the late 1970s and the early 1980s, Donadoni created a number of games for IT, some of which, like Zargo's Lords and Kroll & Prumni, were very successful and largely contributed to popularize wargaming in Italy and other European countries, such as France. Angelo Porazzi, designer of Warangel (one of the most popular Italian wargames of recent years) has often cited Donadoni's work as one of his major sources of inspiration. Donadoni remained as IT's main game designer until the company went bankrupt in the late 1980s, designing more than a hundred games. After that, he collaborated with several other major Italian game companies such as Editrice Piccoli, Editrice Giochi and others.

== Games designed by Donadoni ==
=== Wargames ===
- Iliad. International Team, 1979.
- Kroll & Prumni. International Team, 1979.
- Odyssey. International Team, 1979.
- Okinawa. International Team, 1979.
- York Town. International Team, 1979.
- Zargo's Lords. International Team, 1979.
- Waterloo. International Team, 1980.
- Idro. International Team, 1980.
- Jena. International Team, 1980.
- Austerlitz. International Team, 1981.
- East & West. International Team, 1981.
- Wohrom. International Team, 1981.
- Norge. International Team, 1981.
- Rommel. International Team, 1981.
- Sicilia '43 . International Team, 1981.
- Bonaparte. International Team, 1982.
- Zargo's Lords II (expansion set for Zargo's Lords). International Team, 1983.

=== Role playing games ===
- with Silvio Cadelo. Legio VII. International Team, 1982.
- with Mauro Moretti. Magikon. International Team, 1983.
- Tablin (expansion set for Legio VII). International Team, 1983..

=== Boardgames ===
- 3. Editrice Giochi, 1987.
- Empire. International Team, 1979.
- Grand prix. International Team, 1983.
- Il gioco dell'oste. International Team, 1987.
- Il giro d'Italia. International Team, 1983.
- Jolly roger, International Team, 1979.
- Jonathan. International Team, 1984.
- Mafia. International Team, 1983.
- Magic Wood. International Team, 1979.
- Medici. International Team, 1979.
- Mundialito. International Team, 1985.
- Play off. International Team, 1985.
- Ra. International Team, 1979.
- Rally. International Team, 1980.
- Referendum. International Team, 1985.
- Roma. International Team, 1986. Ripubblicato dalla Editrice Giochi.
- Rossi adventures. International Team, 1983.
- Samarcanda. International Team, 1982.
- Single game. International Team, 1987.
- Smoking game. International Team, 1983.
- Superbowl. International Team, 1983.
- Terre des Bètes. International Team, 1984.
- Skizzo. Smemoranda, 1984.
- Tele foot. International Team, 1987
- Thalassa. International Team, 1984
- Trafic. Editrice Piccoli, 1985
- Zodiac memo take. International Team, 1987.
- Referendum. Per il comitato elezione diretta dei sindaci, 1983.
- Squali e pesciolini, Editrice Piccoli, 1986.
- Traffic, Editrice Piccoli, 1986.
- Luna Park, Editrice Piccoli, 1986.
- Occhi di Gatto, Editrice Piccoli, 1986.
- Taxi, Editrice Piccoli, 1986.
- Treni & C, Editrice Piccoli, 1986.
- Blue Stones. International Team, 1987.
- Landsknecht. International Team, 1987.
- Leonardo. Editrice Giochi, 1989
- Communication. Editrice Giochi 1990.
- Viaggiamo nel corpo umano. Editrice Giochi 1991.
- Nella preistoria. Editrice Giochi 1991.
- In fondo al mare. Editrice Giochi 1991.
- Visual game. Arti Grafiche Ricordi, 1992.
- Sandokan. Giochi Preziosi, 1993.
- Monstercrash. Arti Grafiche Ricordi, 1992.
- Il gioco di Radio DJ. Arti Grafiche Ricordi, 1993.
- Tuchulka. daVinci Editrice, 2005.
