= Landsknecht (game) =

Landsknecht is a 1987 board game published by International Team.

== Gameplay ==
Landsknecht is a game in which a two-player wargame simulates fifteenth-century militia clashes at a detailed tactical scale, featuring customizable companies, scalable difficulty, and historically inspired battles with up to 300 units.

== Reviews ==
- Casus Belli #38
- Casus Belli #46
- Jeux & Stratégie #45
