= Yom Kippur (game) =

Board game

Yom Kippur is a 1983 board game published by International Team.

== Gameplay ==
Yom Kippur is a game in which the Egyptian and Syrian assault on Israel during the Yom Kippur War is simulated.

== Reviews ==
- Casus Belli #25
- Jeux & Stratégie #29
