= MOCKBA: La battaglia di Mosca 1941 =

Board game

MOCKBA: La battaglia di Mosca 1941 is a 1984 board game published by International Team.

== Gameplay ==
MOCKBA: La battaglia di Mosca 1941 is a game in which the Battle of Moscow is depicted.

== Reviews ==
- Casus Belli #24
- Jeux & Stratégie #26
