= Clans (board game) =

Board game designed by Leo Colovini

- Designers: Leo Colovini
- Players: 2-4
- Setup time: 5 minutes
- Playing time: 30 minutes
- Chance: Low
- Age range: 10 and up
- Skills: Bluffing

Clans is a German-style board game designed by Leo Colovini. The game centers on the creation of villages.

== Gameplay ==
At the start of the game, each player is secretly dealt a card that has one of five colors on it - red, yellow, blue, green, or black. Although each player knows his own color, but not color of any of the other players. The game begins with one hut on each space, the colors being randomly distributed across the huts. On his turn, a player moves all of the huts from one space to another space. When a group of huts is completely isolated (all the surrounding spaces are empty) that space is scored. Scoring is different based on the terrain that those huts are on. The person with the most huts on that space, and anyone tied for the most, gets points. The game ends when the moves have been exhausted.

== Awards ==
- Nominee for the Spiel des Jahres, 2003
- 3rd in the Deutscher Spiele Preis, 2003
- Games magazine Best Abstract Strategy Game of 2003
- Winner, game of the year "stoner award 2018 Leeuwarden".
