= Russian Civil War 1918–1922 =

1976 board wargame

Russian Civil War 1918–1922 is a board wargame published by Simulations Publications Inc. (SPI) in 1976 that simulates the Russian Civil War. It sold well and remained a popular and sought after game for many years after its publication.

== Background ==
In late 1917, the revolutionary Bolsheviks led by Vladimir Lenin overthrew the social-democratic Russian Provisional Government that had been formed following the abdication of Tsar Nicholas II. What followed was a chaotic multi-faction civil war in which the Bolsheviks fought for control of Russia against a loose alliance of counter-revolutionary forces known as the White Army. The situation was further complicated by the rise of nationalist forces in Poland, Finland, Ukraine and the Baltic states that sought freedom from the old Russian Empire. Allied forces fresh from the battlefields of the Western Front also arrived to bolster the White Army.

== Description ==
Russian Civil War is a board wargame for 3-6 players. There are four forces represented: The revolutionary Reds, the counter-revolutionary Whites, nationalist forces (green counters), and interventionist forces (blue counters). There are also counters for individual leaders, as well as counters for Imperial Gold and the Tsar.

At the start of the game, each player draws unit counters from a general pool, and will generally end up with a mixture of all four colors.

There are rules about who can attack whom:

- Red units can attack everyone
- White units can attack Red and Green, but not Blue
- Green may attack Red and White, but not Blue
- Blue may only attack Red

There are also special rules for Purges and Assassinations.

On their turn, each player has the following phases:

- Random Events
- Movement
- Combat — Depending on the state of the war and who is winning, a player can make the strategic decision to have the units of one faction under their control attack units of another faction also under the player's control.
- Randomizer: The player draws one Randomizer counter, which may award the player with Assassin markers (to eliminate leaders), control of one of the nationalist or interventionist forces, or the ability to trigger the withdrawal of Blue forces.

After each player completes these four phases, all players can return eliminated units to play if the owning player controls the home province of the unit. This ability to rebuild units ends after the fifth turn.

When all players have finished a turn, the players draw to see who will go first for the next turn.

=== Victory conditions ===
The game will be won by either Red or White. Each player, having both Red and White counters, might accumulate victory points for both factions.

Once one faction has won the war, players add up the Victory Points they accumulated for the winning faction — the player with the most points is the winner.

== Publication history ==
in the mid-1970s, game designer Jim Dunnigan was drawn to chaos of the Russian Civil War, and attempted to create something of that atmosphere, later writing, "Giving the players too much rationality would deny them the key element of the event. The player is given too much information just in the rules and the game components. And there's always historical hindsight. So, a lot of strange, but effective elements were built into the game."

The result was Russian Civil War, the first in a series of games Dunnigan envisioned called "Power Politics". Russian Civil War featured graphic design by Redmond A. Simonsen, and was released as a boxed set by SPI in 1976. The game immediately climbed to #7 on SPI's Top Ten Bestselling Games list, and stayed there for 4 months. It remained popular and over twenty years later, critic Brian Train noted that it was still "a perennial favorite" among wargamers. Train also pointed out that in the used game market, copies of Russian Civil War were much sought after, selling for as much as $200.

SPI released two more games in the "Power Politics" series — The Plot to Assassinate Hitler, and After the Holocaust — but neither was popular and no other games in the series were published.

In 2011, game designers Ty Bomba and Joseph Miranda revised the rules of Russian Civil War, expanding the map, and adding new counters for more nationalist and interventionist forces. This second edition was published by Decision Games in Issue 267 of Strategy & Tactics.

== Reception ==
In Issue 28 of Moves, Steve List commented, "The game has much to offer — diplomacy for the honest, skullduggery for the treacherous, and schizophrenia for the undecided. Military strategy must be properly employed to deal effectively with military strength, but political strategy is required as well." List concluded, "Aside from the joys of purging your favorite enemy, the chief attraction of this game is in the problem of defining your enemy and moving against him while getting him to waste his effort on someone else."

In Issue 15 of Battlefield, John M. Astell noted the lack of historicity of the game, writing, "For those who do not care about historical accuracy, "SPI's Russian Civil War is an enjoyable multi-player game." Astell suggested that more players made for a better game, writing, "The three player game is good, but not as lively as a four to six player game." He also noted "It is surprising that the game has no two-player scenario" and suggested some rule changes to make that possible.

In The Guide to Simulations/Games for Education and Training, history professor Martin Campion didn't think the game would be a good educational aid, saying, "The game has some interesting points, but the lack of identity that it forces on the player makes it more difficult than it should be to use in a serious educational application."

In a retrospective review in Issue 3 of Simulacrum, Brian Train called Russian Civil War "one of those rare birds in the hobby: a multi-player game that genuinely works, is balanced towards no one player (because of the random setup) and almost never plays the same way twice." Train concluded with a recommendation to find a used copy of the game, saying, "Besides its obvious collector's value, you will want this one if you have any friends at all (although if you're too sneaky playing this, you won't have them much longer!)"

== Awards ==
In 2011 the second edition of the game published by Decision Games was a finalist for a Charles S. Roberts Award in the category "Best Magazine Game".

== Other reviews and commentary ==
- Fire & Movement #4
- Strategy & Tactics #57
