= Samaira Mehta =

American coder and inventor

- Born: March 2, 2008 (age 18)
- Education: Archbishop Mitty High School, Johns Hopkins University
- Occupations: Coder, inventor, chief executive officer
- Years active: 2016–present
- Known for: CoderBunnyz

Samaira Mehta is an American coder and board game designer. She is the founder and chief executive officer of CoderBunnyz, a company that produces a board game of the same name for teaching children how to code.

== Life ==
Mehta is from Santa Clara, California. Her father is an engineer. She began coding when she was 6 years old with her father as her teacher. She created the board game CoderBunnyz, with the help of her little brother, to teach other children how to code. She designed the game over the course of a year. After she came up with the game's design, she worked with graphics designers and game manufacturers in China and New Zealand. Mehta speaks at workshops and conferences including at Microsoft, Intel, and Google. She first started presenting at workshops at the Santa Clara City Library. She spoke at the 2019 C2 Montréal Conference. Mehta aims to eliminate gender bias and increase the number of women in engineering.

=== CoderBunnyz ===
The name "CoderBunnyz" combines her interest in board games and coding with bunnies, her favorite animal. The game provides instruction on basic concepts in artificial intelligence and Java. It includes five major topics including training, back propagation, inference, adaptive learning, and autonomous.

== Awards and honors ==
In 2016, Mehta won the $2,500 second-place prize at Think Tank Learning's Pitchfest. She received a letter from former first lady Michelle Obama.

In 2026, Mehta won the California High School Speech Association state championship in Original Oratory Speech.
