= Arena of Death (game) =

Board game

Ares #4 (September 1980) contained Arena of Death. Art by Joe Jusko.

Arena of Death is a fantasy combat board game published by Simulations Publications, Inc. (SPI) in 1980.

== Gameplay ==
Arena of Death is a game that uses the combat system from the first edition of DragonQuest to conduct gladiator combat in an arena, and players take on the combat roles of various fantasy creatures and warriors.

== Publication history ==
SPI published the fantasy role-playing game DragonQuest in 1980. As game historian Shannon Appelcline noted, the combat system was very good, saying, "the strength of the combat system was shown by SPI's release of a board game using the same mechanics called Arena of Death (1980)."

SPI published it as a pull-out board game titled Arena of Death in Issue #4 of Moves (September 1980). The game was also released as a boxed game.

== Reception ==
In Issue 38 of The Space Gamer, Eric Paperman was not overly impressed, saying, "The only people to whom I can recommend this game are fantasy role-players interested in adapting Arena of Death's combat and maneuver rules for use with their FRPG. DragonQuest is probably a better buy; for [a slightly higher price] you get monsters, magic, and other skills, and a slightly more complete combat and character generation system."

Almost 35 years after the game's publication, Shannon Appelcline noted that there were some issues when the game was first released, writing "there was some awkwardness in the combat system that wouldn't be entirely addressed for several years."
