= Marcel-André Casasola Merkle =

German game designer

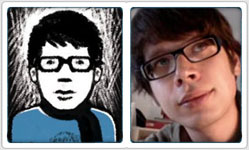
Marcel-André Casasola Merkle

Marcel-André Casasola Merkle (born 10 August 1977 in Nuremberg, Bavaria, Germany) is a game designer.

He has published thirteen games, including Rules!, and illustrated for over 20. Together with other designers, he is active as a game editor since 1999 (amongst others for TransAmerica, 2002). He is co-founder (2000) of the publishing company Lookout Games. His games "Verräter" ("traitor") and "Meuterer" ("mutineer") have won the "À-la-carte-Kartenspielpreis" price of the German games magazine "Fairplay". He's also the initiator of the wiki "Lexikon des Spieleerfindens" ("lexicon of game-invention").
