= World of Warcraft: The Board Game =

Board game

- Designers: Christian T. Petersen; Eric M. Lang
- Publishers: Fantasy Flight Games
- Players: 2–6
- Setup time: 15-30 minutes
- Playing time: 2-4+ hours
- Chance: Medium (dice rolling, luck)
- Age range: 12 and up

World of Warcraft: The Board Game is an adventure board game based on the popular World of Warcraft MMORPG. The game was designed and published by Fantasy Flight Games in 2005.

== Overview ==
In World of Warcraft: The Board Game, players take on the roles of various characters such as hunters or warlocks of either the Alliance or Horde faction. During the game, players adventure across the continent of Lordaeron, earning experience as well as new items and abilities. The ultimate objective of the game is to defeat a powerful "Overlord".

The basic game is timed to thirty turns; at the end of that time, if the Overlord has not been defeated, the game is settled by a player versus player battle between the two factions. Unlike most games of this type, play is (usually) cooperative between the members of each faction, as victory is earned collectively by all members of a faction. One of the game's expansions changes the endgame, however.

Counting all tokens, cards, and figures, the game has over 1000 individual components.

== Reception ==
While World of Warcraft: The Board Game makes a solid effort to impart the flavor and feel of the MMORPG to a board game, this doesn't come without a cost. One reviewer noted that, despite really liking the game, the game's high price, massive physical size, and lengthy play time (4+ hours) were definite downsides. Another felt that although the game's complexity provided a steep learning curve, it also greatly enhanced replayability (assuming like-minded friends who could devote the many required hours were available). Many players have remarked on how the Alliance and Horde players almost never interact during the games played resulting in the gameplay taking on a strange "multiple solitaire" feel. Other complaints included the lengthy amount of "down-time" during the other players' turn.

== Expansions ==
The board game has received two expansions, The Shadow of War and The Burning Crusade. The Shadow of War primarily added quests for independent blue creatures while The Burning Crusade increased character levels to six, added two new races, a new purple class of monster, and dungeons to the game and introduced an entire new region with its own board called Outland. Both expansions added new items, events and quests. A third expansion, called Scions of Darkness, was listed as Coming Soon before Fantasy Flight redesigned their web site and removed all of their upcoming product announcements.

The playable character miniature figures, which are made of plastic, are replaceable with optional bronze miniatures in the same size. These were also included in the Limited Edition which could be pre-ordered before the game was released, although small differences between those bronze figures exists.

In 2011, FFG announced that the licensing agreement for all Warcraft products came to an end, and that all support and forthcoming expansions were therefore cancelled.
