= Cartagena (board game) =

2000 board game

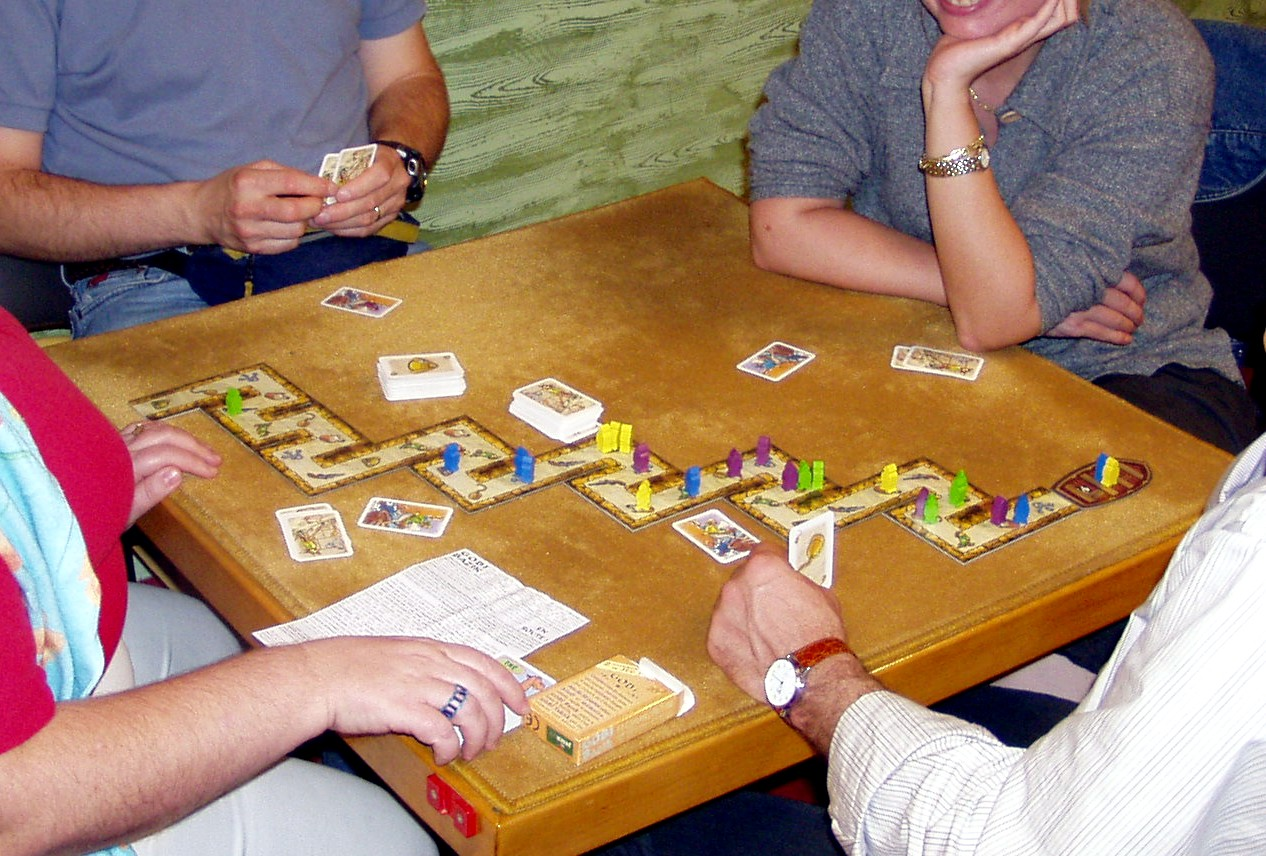
- Designers: Leo Colovini
- Publishers: Corfix; Identity Games International B.V. Nordic Games; Oya; Rio Grande Games; Tilsit; Venice Connection; Winning Moves Germany
- Players: 2 to 5
- Setup time: 5 minutes
- Playing time: 45 minutes
- Chance: Medium
- Age range: 13 to adult
- Skills: Planning

Cartagena is a German-style board game released in 2000, that takes as its theme the 1672 pirate-led jailbreak from the dreaded fortress of Cartagena.

With its very simple concept, the game of strategy gives each player a group of six pirates and the objective is to have all six escape through the tortuous underground passage that connects the fortress to the port, where a sloop is waiting for them.

== Gameplay ==
The first player to move all of his or her pirates from the Cartagena prison to the sloop is the winner.

=== Set-up ===
The game board and its pieces were designed by Leo Colovini and drawn by artists Christoph Clasen, Claus Stephan, Didier Guiserix, Martin Hoffmann, and Studio Tapiro. The board itself is made up of six double-sided sections, each of which has a different permutation of the same six pictures: daggers, pirate hats, pistols, bottles of rum, skulls, and skeleton keys. These six sections can be combined in any order, to make thousands of different games (although nowhere near as many as the 720^{6} combinations theoretically possible).

Each player is dealt six cards out of a set of 102: 17 cards for each of the six pictures. Each also begins the game with six pirates, represented by solid-coloured, wooden figures. Color choices include brown, red, yellow, green, and blue. The player who looks most like a pirate goes first, with gameplay proceeding in a clockwise direction.

=== Turns ===
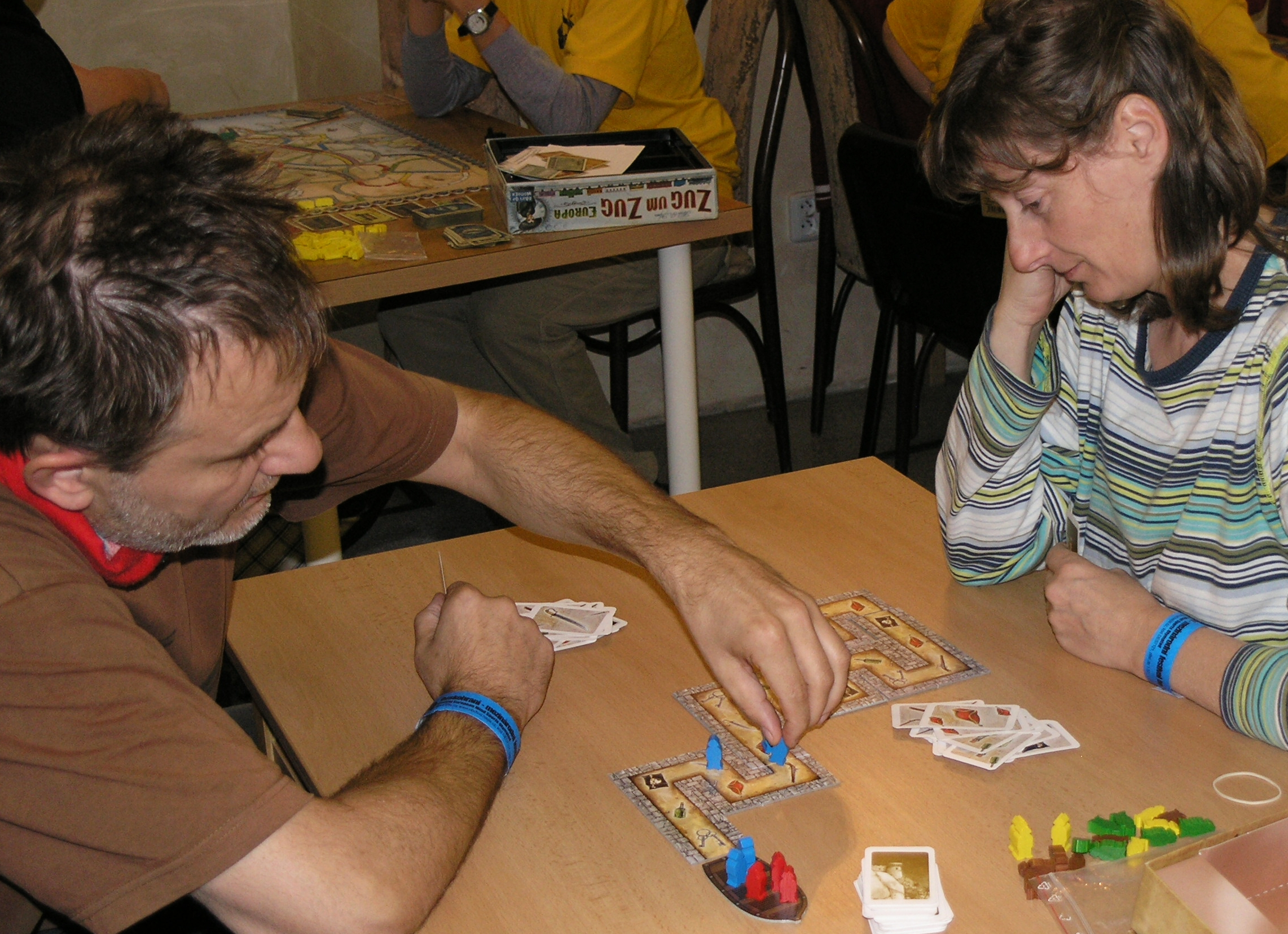
Cartagena

During one's turn, a player can make between one and three moves. Each move sees one of the player's pirate going either forward or backward. Pirates are moved forward by playing the cards in their hand. New cards can only be obtained by moving backward.

To move forward, the player selects a pirate. plays a card, and moves that pirate forward to the next unoccupied square with the same picture as the card. If there are no unoccupied spaces ahead, the pirate moves to the sloop.

To move backward, the player selects a pirate and moves it back to the closest square with one or two pirates. If that square has one pirate, the player draws one card; if it has two pirates, the player draws two. Pirates cannot be moved all the way back to Cartagena.

=== Variations ===
The game can be played in two variants: Jamaica, in which the deck is hidden and players cannot see each other's cards, and Tortuga, in which the cards are visible. The game plays quite differently in the two versions. Jamaica games tend to be fast-paced (30–45 minutes), and involve both skill and luck. Tortuga games involve much less luck; the game is simple enough that the winner is usually the player who can perform the deepest analysis.

== Series ==
A published sequel to the game, Cartagena II, was released in 2006. It follows the storyline of the original game, with the pirates working to figure out what to do now that they have escaped the prison. It is based on the same card-based movement mechanism but introduces additional gameplay elements. In particular, the board is divided into two islands, and pirates are ferried from one to the other on a single boat.

Cartagena: Die Goldinsel was released in 2008 by a different designer, Rüdiger Dorn and published only by Winning Moves Germany. This game sees the pirates searching for Treasure Island, after having escaped the fortress of Cartagena and returned to the Pirates' Nest in the previous two games. Players take on the role of pirate captains and try to get together a new crew of pirates, gather Island cards and acquire digging rights before setting sail to Treasure Island.

Cartagena: Die Meuterei was released in 2009. This game too was published by Winning Moves but was designed by Michael Rieneck. The saga of Cartagena continues with the first signs of a mutiny emerging after a long calm. Players try to equip with gold and weapons and evaluate the strengths and weaknesses of other players in order to obtain the most gold and thus win the game. A new version of Cartagena was released in 2017 that includes both the classic base game mixed with Cartagena 2: The Pirate's Nest, and several new variants.

Cartagena: Escape Diaries was released in 2023. It is a reprint of the original as the "First Escape", adding a Captain to your crew with special abilities as the "Second Escape", and adding rafts as an alternate way to reach the end as the "Third Escape". Cartagena can also be played online in real-time at BrettspielWelt. There are two turn-based online versions available at Youplay.it and Cartagena Online.

== Category ==
Cartagena is generally categorized as a race game. It is much shorter and simpler than Hare and Tortoise, which is often considered the exemplar of race games. It is usually played as a light time-killer rather than a serious competition. However, it is much more complicated and requires much more skill (even in the Jamaica variant) than children's race games like Snakes and Ladders.

It is also has been categorized as a family game and a pirates game. For its mechanics, it has been grouped with modular board games as well as hand management games. Also, its lack of necessary in-game text makes it accessible to non-English speakers. The fact that each player has six pieces and three moves per turn makes the strategy somewhat different from most other games. Therefore, it has been very well received by casual gamers.

== Awards ==
- 2007 BoardGamer.ru Recommendation
- 2002 Nederlandse Spellenprijs Winner
- 2001 Spiel des Jahres Recommendation

== Reviews ==
- Pyramid

== Alternate names ==
Cartagena is also available under the following titles: Cartagena 1: Flucht aus der Festung, Cartagena: The Escape, Les évadés de Cartagena, and 惡魔島.
