= Blue Stones =

Blue Stones is a 1987 board game published by International Team.

== Gameplay ==
Blue Stones is a game in which a tactical fantasy wargame is set in the world of Zargo, where Wizard‑Monks defend magical stones against three rival races.

== Reviews ==
- Casus Belli #36
- Jeux & Stratégie #43
