= Fearsome Floors =

Horror board game

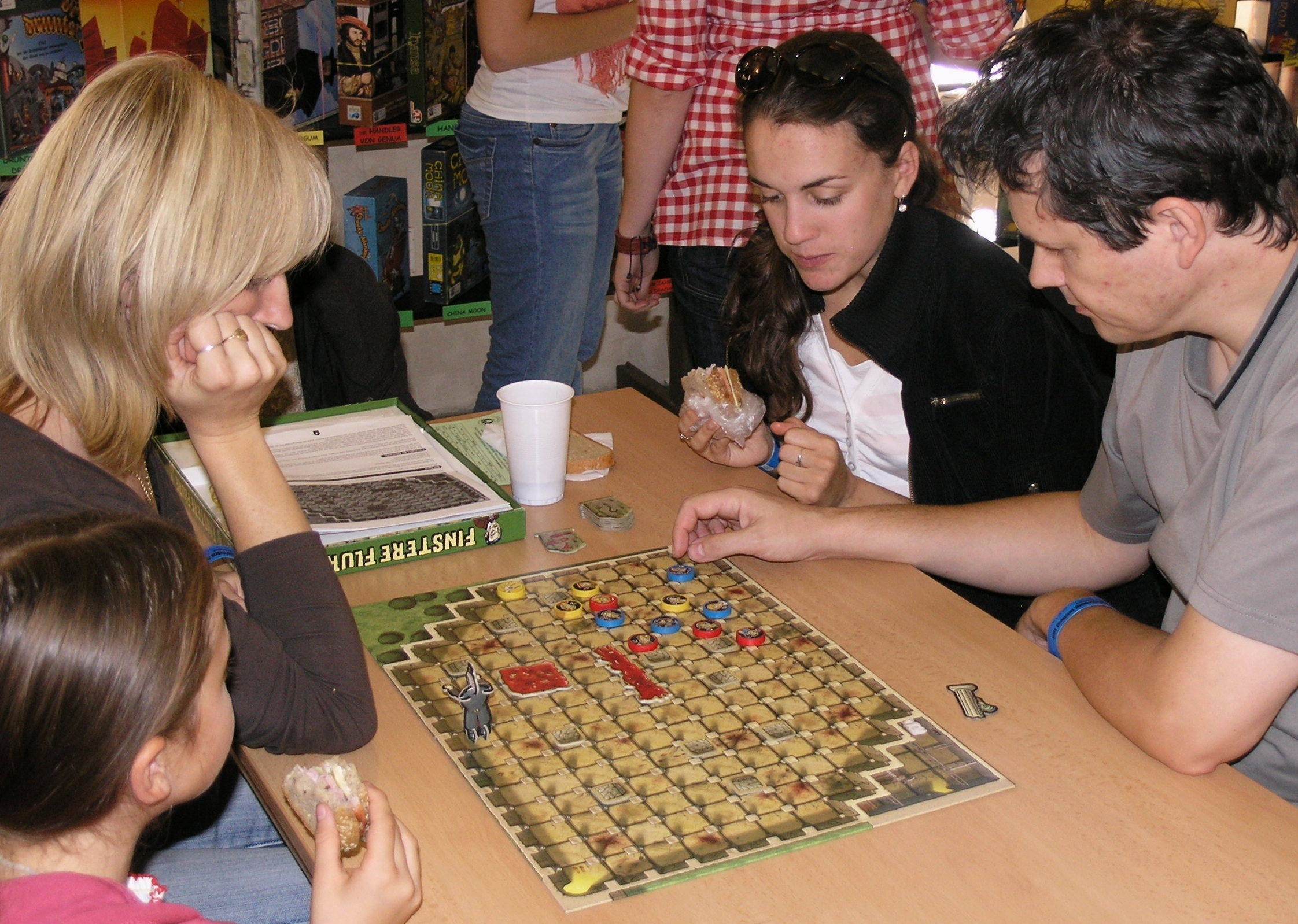
- People in 2008 playing Fearsome Floors
- Other names: Finstere Flure; La Crypte de la Créature; Fuggi Fuggi
- Designers: Friedemann Friese
- Illustrators: Maura Kalusky
- Publishers: 2F-Spiel; Rio Grande Games
- Publication: 2003; 23 years ago
- Genres: Horror game; Racing game
- Players: 2–7
- Playing time: 60 minutes
- Age range: 10+

Fearsome Floors, also known as Finstere Flure, La Crypte de la Créature, and Fuggi Fuggi, is a horror board game designed by Friedemann Friese and published by 2F-Spiel and Rio Grande Games in 2003. It is a game in which a chaotic race through a collapsing dungeon has players maneuver their disks toward the exit while manipulating a ravenous monster's movement to devour opponents before it devours them.

== Gameplay ==
Player tokens are double sided, with a different amount of movement on each side totalling to 7 (either 6/1, 4/3, 3/4, or 2/5) in each colour. Players take all player tokens of a specific colour and, beginning on the start space, every round will take turns moving each of them the indicated number of spaces and then flip them over so their movement range will be different the next round. Some spaces have stone pillars that players can push or hide behind. Player tokens that reach the exit space "escape" and are removed from the game. If all but one of a player's tokens escape, the game ends and that player is the winner.

Once all player tokens have moved for the round, the monster moves. A movement card is drawn which determines the number of spaces the monster can move on its turn. Starting on the exit space, the monster checks all the spaces in the row or column to the left, right, and above it for a player token; it then moves one space in direction of the closest one or one space in the last direction it moved if one is not found. The monster cannot see through stone pillars. This checking and moving is repeated until the monster has moved the number of spaces on the drawn movement card, eating player tokens it encounters along the way.

At the start of the game, player tokens that are eaten restart at the entrance space. Once the second to last monster movement card is drawn, the cards and reshuffled and devoured player tokens will be removed from the game instead if devoured. If the second to last monster movement card is drawn again or all player tokens are removed from the game, the game ends and the player with the most escaped escaped player tokens wins.

There are additional rules for more experienced players which add new floor tiles that block player movement but not monster vision or turn or teleport the monster.

== Reception ==
Rue Morgue rated Fearsome Floors 3/3 for graphics, 3/3 for playability, and 0/3 for "shivers", writing that it is "as pleasurable to gaze at as it is to play". Andy Vetromile gave the game a positive review in Pyramid. In an episode of The Dice Tower, Tom Vasel praised Fearsome Floors for its entertaining and chaotic gameplay and flexible player count, but noted "if you take this game too seriously, it's not enjoyable any more" and that people who over-analyze moves may not like the game.

Fearsome Floors was nominated for the Multiplayer General Strategy category of the 2004 International Gamers Awards and the 2004 Deutscher Spiel Preis.
