= After the Holocaust (game) =

Board wargame published in 1976

Cover art by Redmond A. Simonsen, 1976

After the Holocaust, subtitled "The Nuclear Devastation of America: Recovery and Reunification", is a near-future board wargame published by Simulations Publications, Inc. (SPI) in 1976 that simulates the economic recovery of the United States following a nuclear war. The game was the third and last in SPI's "Power Politics" series.

== Description ==
After the Holocaust is a 3–4 player game in which each player controls about a quarter of the United States. The game is set in the year 2001, 20 years after the United States was devastated by the nuclear holocaust of World War III. The country has split into four regions: Northeast, Midwest, Southwest and Far West. Each player attempts to raise their region from subsistence farming to a more advanced social and technological society through trade, diplomacy and possibly combat.

=== Components ===
The game box contains:

- two-piece 17" x 22" mounted hex grid map of the United States
- 400 die-cut counters
- 2-page rule book
- four player aid sheets
- paper money
- two six-sided dice
- counter tray

=== Gameplay ===
A standard game lasts ten turns, each of which represents one year. Each turn is divided into five rounds.

- Production Round: Players produce basic and secondary goods (expressed in points) and mobilize any military units.
- Trade Round: Players negotiate the exchange of goods and cash between themselves.
- Consumption Round: Players expend basic and secondary goods to feed and compensate their population and determine the "Social Status" of their region.
- Military/Political Round: Players move military units and engage in combat and attempt to gain control of other regions.
- Finance Round: Players reallocate labor and capital assets and set investment and tax rates.

As reviewer Phil Kosnett noted, the emphasis in the game is multiplayer co-operation and trade, and it only becomes a wargame if one player starts an arms race.

=== Victory conditions ===
At the end of ten turns, each player calculates their victory points by a multi-step process:

1. The number of controlled areas x Social State = Raw Victory Points
2. Raw Victory Points - [(Number of military units + unemployed labor points) x Social State] - (starving Labor Points x Social State x 3) = Adjusted Victory Point Total

The player with the highest Adjusted Victory Point Total is the winner.

An optional rule dispenses with the ten-turn limit, and the game only ends when one player completely dominates the others.

== Publication history ==
In 1976, SPI produced three games in its "Power Politics" series: Russian Civil War, The Plot to Assassinate Hitler, and After the Holocaust. The latter was designed by Irad B. Hardy and Redmond A. Simonsen, with Simonsen also supplying the graphic design and cover art. After its release in November 1976, the game appeared on SPI's Top Ten Bestseller list for four months.

== Reception ==
In Issue 11 of The Space Gamer, Norman S. Howe was enchanted by the game, saying, "This is a marvelous game. They even provide income tax forms for the players."

In his 1977 book The Comprehensive Guide to Board Wargaming, Nicholas Palmer called the game "a fascinating choice of strategies [...] Highly innovative." In his 1980 sequel, The Best of Board Wargaming, Palmer added "An economic simulation thinly disguised as a wargame: if economics bore you, beware!" He concluded by giving the game an average "excitement" rating of 65%, a rules clarity rating of 85%, and a maximum complexity rating of 100%, saying, "it may well be a suitable classroom tool for basic economic concepts."

In the inaugural issue of Ares, Eric Goldberg found that the "rules are muddy in places, and economic realities limit the 'payoff' a player can receive for good play." Despite this, Goldberg gave the game a recommendation, concluding, "After the Holocaust is a fine teaching device and an intriguing game. It falls short as a simulation only because of the difficult nature of its subject. The patient or the studious gamer will find After the Holocaust a worthwhile investment."

In Issue 33 of Moves, Phil Kosnett called this a game of "Power Politics" rather than combat. He concluded, "No technological [science fiction] mechanics, but flavorful."

In his 1980 book The Complete Book of Wargames, game designer Jon Freeman commented "Those who presume gamers are a bunch of warmongers would be shocked by this game: military efforts tend to be mutually destructive and as such are best relegated to last-gasp efforts." He concluded by giving this game an overall evaluation of "Good", saying, "Although considerably off the beaten path, this is of interest — even if it's not as realistic as it would have you believe."

History professor Martin Campion tried this game as an educational tool and reported in The Guide to Simulations/Games for Education and Training, "I have proved, with a small group of volunteers from our class "The Future as History", that it can be played by ordinary college students, but it takes a long time to get the game started." Campion warned that this game "is a serious attempt at a simulation of an economy, and as such it is very complex." He concluded, "It is a fascinating study of the relationship between economic power and military might in developing countries."

Three years after its publication, Andrew McGee, writing in Phoenix, called the game "one of the most underrated of all contemporary simulation games." He admitted that "it is something quite different from the run-of-the-mill simulation game", and concluded "it does give a good basic understanding of the difficulties of managing an economy."

In Issue 4 of Simulacrum, Brian Train noted, "This is not a simple or fast game, and is certainly not for the 'panzer pusher' [...] I feel the game's main value lies in forcing cooperation between players, both to advance themselves and to combine against a warlord." Train noted that the lack of spreadsheet technology in 1977 meant a lot of paperwork was required, and concluded, "If you are the sort of person who derives fun and a sense of accomplishment from filling out your tax return, you will probably like this game."

== Other reviews and commentary ==
- Strategy & Tactics #60
- Fire & Movement #8
- Strategist #343
- Ann Arbor Wargamer #2
- Games & Puzzles #67, 69
