= Jack Radey =

American game designer

Jack Radey (born 1947, Chicago, Illinois) is an American military historian and wargame designer. He set up People's War Games. He was a draft resister, and activist in the Vietnam anti-war movement.

Radey became interested in wargames when his school friend, David D. Friedman taught him how to play Tactics II. Radey related how Friedman and himself wrote to Charles S. Roberts claiming that they had found a first turn winning strategy for each of the two sides. Roberts replied that their interpretation of the rules was valid. He later moved to Merced, California where he graduated in 1964.

Radey also developed an early interest in politics: his mother's family were refugees from the Nazi regime in Germany. He was influenced by both the Civil Rights Movement and the Cuban Revolution, and went to work for the Communist Party United States both as a chauffeur/body guard for Gus Hall as well as for their education department. In 1964 he went to the University of California, Berkeley where he was involved with the Berkeley Free Speech Movement, getting arrested during the Sproul Hall sit-in.

Radey's political sympathies influenced his decision to publish his first game Korsun Pocket, which dealt with the Soviet Union's 1944 victory at the Battle of the Korsun–Cherkassy during World War II. When interviewed by Fire & Movement in 1980, Radey denied that his sympathies made his game biased. (Critic Nicky Palmer, in reviewing Korsun Pocket, agreed with this assessment, writing, "while comments in the rules often betray a certain bias towards the Soviet point of view, the balance of the historical simulation is perfectly fair.") Radey also condemned writers such as Paul Carell and wargame publishers such as Simulations Publications, Inc. for bias. He argued that the role of a wargame designer was to "teach something real about history", and said he hoped that the wargaming hobby would "promote peace not war and treat history with the respect it deserves". Radey also said that he supported the Soviet invasion of Afghanistan which had started at the end of 1979.

== Games ==
The following games by Radey were published by People's War Games:

- 1979 Korsun Pocket: Little Stalingrad on the Dnepr – January 25th to February 17th, 1944
- 1981 Kanev: Parachutes Across the Dnepr
- 1982 Black Sea Black Death
- 1983 Kirovograd
- 1983 Aachen
- 1985 Duel for Kharkov
- 1997 Operation Spark: the Relief of Leningrad 1943

== Books ==
- The Defense of Moscow 1941: The Northern Flank (with Charles Sharp) (2012)
