= Castle Ravenloft (board game) =

2010 board game

Castle Ravenloft Board Game is a board game published in 2010 by Wizards of the Coast. It was the first game released in the Dungeons & Dragons Adventure System board game series.

== Overview ==
In Castle Ravenloft Board Game, the players control Heroes who have come to Barovia to discover the secrets of Castle Ravenloft, and must work as a team to succeed in the adventures within the castle. It features multiple scenarios and quests.

== Gameplay ==
Castle Ravenloft Board Game is a co-operative game for 1-5 players. Each player selects a Hero, and can choose from the Dragonborn Fighter, Human Rogue, Dwarf Cleric, Eladrin Wizard, and Human Ranger.

== Contents ==
Castle Ravenloft Board Game includes 40 plastic heroes and monsters, 13 sheets of interlocking cardstock dungeon tiles, 200 encounter and treasure cards, a rulebook, a scenario book, and a 20-sided die.

== Reception ==
David M. Ewalt of Forbes comments: "Count Strahd von Zarovich and Castle Ravenloft — stars of a beloved Dungeons & Dragons setting — make their board game debut. It's like playing fourth edition D&D, but without a dungeon master or most of the rules. Anyone can play, even if they don't know D&D. It's cooperative, challenging and fun".

Scott Taylor of Black Gate comments: "I have to give the designs props for creating a fresh version of an old concept and if you're looking to have a few hours of fun on a weekend night".

Castle Ravenloft won the Origins Award for Best Board Game of 2010.

Castle Ravenloft Boardgame received the gold ENnie Award for Best RPG Related Product.
