= The Plot to Assassinate Hitler (game) =

Board wargame published in 1976

Strategy & Tactics #59, which contained The Plot to Assassainate Hitler as a pull-out game

The Plot to Assassinate Hitler is a board game published by Simulations Publications (SPI) in 1976 that simulates the power struggles in Germany's High Command in the latter years of World War II. The game was the second game in SPI's "Power Politics" series, but did not sell as well as the other games in the series – critic Brian Train referred to it as "the ugly duckling."

== Background ==
In the summer of 1944, with Allies forcing German forces to retreat on both the Eastern and Western Fronts, a movement in the German High Command and various resistance groups began to coalesce around the idea of assassinating Hitler in order to seize power and sue the Allies for peace before Germany itself could be invaded.

== Contents ==
The Plot to Assassinate Hitler is a game with both solitaire and two-player scenarios. The map shows Germany as well as occupied and neutral countries in Europe in the last two years of World War II. Counters represent individuals who were part of various factions, either protecting Hitler, plotting to overthrow Hitler or neutral. The neutral parties can be persuaded to join one side or the other. The game system, which represents political activity, is resolved using wargame combat rules.

== Publication history ==
In 1976, SPI published Russian Civil War 1918–1922, the first in a three-game series titled "Power Politics." The second in the series was The Plot to Assassinate Hitler, a game designed by Jim Dunnigan, with graphic design by Redmond A. Simonsen. Unlike Russian Civil War, which had been released as a boxed set, this game was published as a free pull-out game in Issue 59 of Strategy & Tactics. SPI also released it as a boxed set the same year. The unconventional game was not popular, and failed to appear on SPI's Top Ten list of bestselling games.

Following the demise of SPI, Hobby Games acquired the rights to the game and published a Japanese-language version as a pullout game in Issue 10 of Tactics magazine (October 1988).

== Reception ==
In the 1977 book The Comprehensive Guide to Board Wargaming, Nicholas Palmer described the game as an "Unusual multi-player game [...] featuring the power struggles behind the facade of the Third Reich".

In The Guide to Simulations/Games for Education and Training, Martin Campion found the game "interesting, but the representation of political infighting in mechanical fashion often gives grotesque results."

In a retrospective review in Issue 4 of Simulacrum, Brian Train noted, "PTAH was the 'ugly duckling' of the three games in the Power Politics series. And frankly, if you don't have an open mind about this design, it will never turn into a swan for you." Train concluded, "I do not assert that what [game designer Jim] Dunnigan did in designing PTAH was mistaken or wrong; I say only that it was on an unfamiliar subject, it looked weird and played oddly enough to turn off most gamers."
