= Ryan Laukat =

American Boardgame designer, Illustrator and Author

- Occupation: illustrator
- Known for: Near and Far, Sleeping Gods, The Ancient World

Ryan Laukat is an American author, and illustrator from Salt Lake City, Utah. He started in 2008, and has worked on a dozen boardgames and illustrations. He founded Red Raven Games in 2011 He is known for the unique art in his boardgames. Many of his games are played using a campaign system and have a story as part of the game mechanism. Ryan Laukat regularly uses the platform Kickstarter to fund the games he published.

== Personal life ==
When he was 13, Ryan Laukat would tape paper to normal playing cards as a way to design games of his own.

Ryan Laukat is married to his wife Malorie and they live in Sandy, Utah.

== Family business ==
Ryan Laukat has worked for the Salt Lake City musical instrument manufacturer Cannonball, which was founded in 1996 by Tevis and Sheryl Laukat, where he played and customized all their trumpets and engraved the bells of all their saxophones and trumpets by hand.

== Career ==
Ryan Laukat attended the 2007 Game Night Games in Salt Lake City, noting that he had spent several months working on a pirate-themed game called "Keys", and hand-painted the game board. Laukat had already been the artist and designer for some games published by Rio Grande Games by 2008, and had designed a game called "Radio Active Cities" where players build cities and convince people to live in them. Laukat was a member of the Board Game Designers Guild of Utah, and helped with the design on the 2008 game Dominion from Rio Grande Games. Laukat was hired by Z-Man Games to illustrate the game Bridge Troll, which was published in 2009.

Laukat founded Red Raven Games in 2011, and produced and illustrated all of its games including City of Iron, the Eight-Minute Empire series, and Artifacts, Inc.. Laukat and his wife Malorie worked on games in their basement and they launched their first Kickstarter in 2011 to publish Empires of the Void. He designed the Eight-Minute Empire game series, published by Red Raven Games. He designed and illustrated the game The Ancient World. Laukat designed the 2015 European strategy game Above and Below for which he made use of the "Book of Tales" concept. He designed and illustrated the 2017 campaign-driven storytelling board game Near and Far, a sequel to Above and Below. He designed the 2021 game Sleeping Gods, for which a free print-and-play demo was released.

Paul Booth in his 2021 book Board Games as Media called Laukat a "créateur, or a board game designer with an identifiable style", noting that Laukat "is aware that he has a particular style in his game mechanics and how much that can change his reputation among board game players". Booth concluded that

"This study of Laukat's games reveals three different ways his créateur status can be discursively constructed: through the game aesthetics, through the narrative worldbuilding, and through the interplay between theme and mechanics. I chose Laukat's gaming output to represent the créateur for a number of reasons. First, there is a manageable output of games to examine. Red Raven Games has published thirteen games, ten of them designed by Laukat. Compared to the output of some designers, for example Reiner Knizia (who has published over 600 games), ten can be studied in a time-sensitive way. Second, Red Raven Games all have a recognizable aesthetic sense, mainly because Laukat does the art for all the games himself. Third, Red Raven Games has become a success in the board game industry: Above and Below (2015), their best-selling game, has sold around 50,000 copies, while the Eight-Minute Empire (2012) series has sold over 40,000 worldwide and has been translated into over fifteen languages. His highest-ranked game on BoardGameGeek (BGG) is Near and Far (2017), with a rank of 132 (as of December 2019). Fourth, on a personal level, I enjoy playing his games—while not a scientifically valid rationale, the fact that his games are fun while also retaining a sense of his particular style is a meaningful factor in the discursive construction of the créateur."

=== Games published ===
- Eight-minute Empire (2012).
- Empires of the Void (2012).
- The Ancient World (2014).
- Above and Below (2015).
- Islebound (2016).
- Near and Far (2017).
- Empires of the Void II (2018).
- Roam (2019)
- Sleeping Gods (2021).
- Knightfall (2022).
- Now or Never (2022).
