= Iliad: The Most Renowned War Legend =

Board wargame

Box cover art by Enea Riboldi

Iliad: The Most Renowned War Legend is a board wargame published by the Italian game publisher International Team (IT) in 1979 that simulates the siege of Troy as described in Homer's Iliad.

== Background ==
As described in Homer's Iliad, Paris of Troy kidnapped Helen, daughter of Menelaus and took her to Troy. Menelaus gathered an army and besieged Troy for nine years. Then disputes arose between the Greek kings Agamenon and Achilles, and Achilles withdrew from the siege.

== Description ==
Iliad is a two-player board wargame in which one player controls the Greek besiegers, and the other controls the Trojan defenders. The game simulates the four days of battle described in Homer's ode following the departure of Achilles.

The boxed set comes with a hex grid game board, 51 counters divided between Greek and Trojan heroes, and a 10-page rulebook written in Italian, with English, French and German translations.

Complexity of play was rated by the publisher as Level 1 (the least complex). Critic Tom Oleson noted, "Because of its simplicity, Iliad is only useful as an introductory game."

=== Victory conditions ===
- The Greek player wins if Troy is occupied by 5 Greek heroes.
- The Trojan player wins if the Greek encampment is occupied by 5 Trojan heroes.

== Publication history ==
Iliad was designed by Marco Donadoni, and published by IT in 1979 with box cover art by Enea Riboldi.

Although Game Designers' Workshop had published a game titled Iliad the previous year, the two games are not related.

== Reception ==
In Issue 22 of Fire & Movement, Tom Oleson thought the best thing about the game was "its superlative appearance, among the most striking of all wargames." However, Oleson found the game was too long despite its simplistic rules, often running four to five hours. Oleson also noted, "although the rules are short and unsophisticated, they are riddled with ambiguities ... One of the key ambiguities concerns Achilles’ possible entry in an emergency." Oleson concluded, "This game is interesting as an example of the 'state of the art' in Italy, not for purchase and repeated play. If I were stranded on a desert island with Iliad, I'm sure I could play it many times with enjoyment — but it certainly wouldn't be on my list of games to take with me to that island, even if the list had 100 places."

In a retrospective review in Simulacrum written over twenty years after the game's publication, Joseph Scoleri commented, "While the IT games are notable for their polished components, many of them also became notorious (to English readers) on account of their rulebooks written in Italian, English, French and German. The English translations are renowned for being poorly done." Scoleri noted that the game had been relatively expensive (US$34.95) when it was first published, writing "Iliad did not offer much gameplay for your dollar — especially when you consider that it sold for almost $8 more than games such as SPI's NATO Division Commander (a 1200 counter wargame which offered hour after hour of game play)."

== Awards ==
At the 1979 Origins Awards, Iliad was a finalist for a Charles S. Roberts Award in the category "Best Fantasy/Futuristic Board Game of 1978".
