= Above and Below (game) =

Fantasy board game

- Designers: Ryan Laukat
- Publishers: Red Raven Games
- Publication: 2015; 11 years ago
- Genres: Fantasy
- Players: 2–4
- Playing time: 90 minutes
- Age range: 13+

Above and Below is a fantasy board game designed and illustrated by Ryan Laukat and published in 2015 by Red Raven Games. It is a game in which a lone survivor rebuilding after disaster leads a band of villagers to develop a thriving settlement above and below ground, exploring perilous caverns and managing unique workers in a competitive blend of storytelling and town‑building.

== Publishing history ==
Ryan Laukat stated that idea for Above and Below came from a drawing of "little house above ground and the cave below" that he did while sketching box covers at a convention. The game was funded by a successful Kickstarter project which exceeded its $15,000 goal, raising $142,148 before closing in March 2015. A german edition of the game, Oben und Unten, was published in 2016 by Schwerkraft Verlag. In 2021, Red Raven Games partnered with Forteller Games to provide audio narration, sound effects, and music for their games catalogue, including Above and Below.

A sequel to Above and Below, titled Near and Far, was published in May 2017 following a successful Kickstarter. In May 2025, Red Raven Games published a sequel titled Above and Below: Haunted, which added ghosts that can haunt properties, as well as new buildings, caves, and cards.

== Gameplay ==
Each player begins the game with a player board, three villager cards, a house card, and some coins. A communal reputation board is placed in the center with five unused villager cards on it. Every round, players take turns selecting villagers to complete actions until all players choose to take no more actions and Pass their turns. A player chooses which and the amount of villagers they want to send to complete and action, after which the chosen villagers will become "exhausted" and moved to the exhausted area of their player board.

When a player chooses to Explore, they draw a cave card with a grid of possible page numbers, roll a dice to determine their encounter, and get the player to their left to read out the corresponding passage from the Encounter Book. The paragraph includes a choice of action, a minimum number of lanterns needed to succeed with that action, and the rewards for completing it. Each villager card lists the minimum dice roll needed to earn different amounts of lanterns. The player rolls a die for each villager sent to the cave and keeps the rewards and the cave card if the total number of lanterns earned is greater than the minimum. Villagers that the player chooses to exert, adding one extra lantern per exerted villager to their total, are sent to the injured area instead of the exhausted.

Using the Build action, a player can choose to spend coins and a villager to build a house or additionally a cave card to build an outpost that give them a special ability or increased income. They can also Harvest goods from built structures that can be saved, sold, or placed on the advancement track, or they can use the Labor action to gain coins. By using the Train action and paying a fee, villagers can recruited from the reputation board and added to a player's town. Free actions like buying from or selling goods to another player don't require villagers to be exhausted. At the end of each round, each player collects income depending on the number of goods on their advancement track, and villagers in the exhausted area return to the workforce.

The game ends after seven rounds and the winner is the player with the most villager points from number of goods on the advancement track, number of buildings, reputation, and card bonuses.

== Reception ==
Ryan Morgenegg, writing for Deseret News, gave Above and Below as "strong recommendation," describing it as "a shining example of what good game design looks like," and praising the game for its accessibility, illustrations, and replayability. In a review for Rebel Times, Piotr Żuchowski admired the game's graphics and simplicity, concluding that it is a great introductory game for new board game players. However, he noted that the limited number of scripts leads to repetition between play throughs, and that the unique city-building aspect quickly became boring without the excitement of the storytelling.
