= Near and Far =

Board game

- Designers: Ryan Laukat
- Illustrators: Ryan Laukat
- Publishers: Red Raven Games (2017)
- Players: 2–4
- Playing time: 60–120 minutes
- Chance: Moderate
- Skills: Strategy, tactics, logic

Near and Far is a board game for 2 to 4 players designed by Ryan Laukat and published by Red Raven Games in 2017. In this map based storytelling board game, players seek fame and fortune and the eventual discovery of a mysterious last ruin. The gameplay blends resource management with a storybook, with players controlling heroes that equip and provision themselves in a town, and then set out to explore the map, setting up camps and completing quests. The game is a sequel to Laukat's Above and Below, which is set in the same fictional universe (Arzium).

The game can be played as an ongoing, 10 game campaign, with each session being played on a different map.

The game was originally sold via a Kickstarter campaign in July 2016, raising over $520,000 from over 7,000 backers.

== Gameplay ==
Players begin in a town, hiring allies and obtaining supplies such as coins, gems, and food from different buildings. They can then explore the world by using one of 11 different maps. The game comes with an atlas of spiral bound world maps, with each flip of the page revealing a different map that can be the board for a particular game.

Players will set up camps on the map, gain resources, defeat threats, and explore story locations through the use of a separate storybook. When a player reaches an adventure location, another player will read the story, which ends by giving the player two choices, and a skill check which must be passed to give rewards. Players win by scoring the most points, many of which come from artifacts, which require certain resources to build.

There are four play modes to the game. There is a tutorial scenario, an arcade mode which eliminates the stories from play, a character mode which has different stories for eight unique characters attempting to find a lost ruin which holds an artifact that will fulfill their heart's desire, and a full campaign mode with far reaching story elements which uses 10 of the game's maps in different play sessions.

== Reception ==
Popular Mechanics, Inverse, and Stuff each cited Near and Far as one of the best board games of 2017, with Matt Thrower of Stuff describing it as "a rare game that can satisfy the desire for both story and strategy at once."

== Expansion ==
In October 2017, Red Raven Games launched an expansion to the game, again via a Kickstarter campaign, titled Near and Far: Amber Mines. The campaign raised over $350,000 from just under 6,600 backers, with an anticipated delivery date of April 2018.
