= Korsun (surname) =

Korsun (Ukrainian: Корсун) is an East Slavic surname. Notable people with the surname include:

- Anna Korsun (born 1986), Ukrainian musician and teacher
- Hanna Korsun (born 1991), Ukrainian singer known as Maruv
- Nikolai Georgiyevich Korsun (1876–1958), Soviet military historian
- Nikolai Nesterovich Korsun (1911–1988), Soviet army officer
