= Havana (board game) =

2009 board game

- Designers: Reinhard Staupe
- Publishers: Rio Grande Games
- Players: 2 to 4
- Setup time: 5 minutes
- Playing time: 30-45 minutes
- Chance: Medium
- Skills: Resource management, Planning

Havana is a board game by Reinhard Staupe. The game takes place just after the Cuban Revolution and is centred around the regeneration of Cuba's capital Havana. It is framed as a sequel to the board game Cuba and uses Michael Menzel's artwork from that game. Released in 2009 the game is published by Rio Grande Games.

Havana is classed as a light strategy game which uses sets of 13 cards for its central game mechanic. The cards are the same for each player with the turn order determined by the values of the two cards which are played each round. This means that the player can change each round and consequently a planned action may be prevented or restricted. Players need to accrue money (pesos), workers, and building materials in order to take a building tile, buying them with the specified number of each resource and consequently scoring that card's victory points. More resources are required for higher value tiles. Reviewers note that Havana "presents a fair level of challenge for a game of its simplicity and brevity" but with it being "unforgiving of mistakes" it is not necessarily particularly good as a 'gateway game'.
