= Kanev: Parachutes Across the Dnepr =

1981 board wargame

Kanev
- Original PWG edition, 1981, cover artwork by Rodger B. MacGowan
- Designers: John Prados
- Illustrators: Rodger B. MacGowan
- Publishers: People's War Games
- Publication: 1981
- Genres: WWII

Kanev: Parachutes Across the Dnepr is a board wargame published by People's War Games (PWG) in 1981 that simulates the Battle of the Dnieper, known for being the second and last mass Soviet paratroop drop during World War II.

== Background ==
In the summer of 1943, German forces in Ukraine, being hard-pressed by a Soviet offensive, built defensive fortifications on the eastern bank of the Dnieper River. Soviet commanders believed they had discovered a chink in the German river defenses, and on 23 September 1943 ordered three airborne brigades to parachute onto the far side of the Dneiper and secure a beachhead for a larger Soviet assault across the river.

== Description ==
Kanev is a board wargame for two players, one of whom controls German forces, while the other controls Soviet forces. The game includes 200 die-cut counters and a 21" x 32" map scaled at 1 mile (1.6 km) per hex.

=== Gameplay ===
The game system uses a traditional "I Go, You Go" system of alternating turns where the Soviet player does the following:

1. Movement
2. Combat
3. Exploitation (Reserve units only can move and fire)

The German player then has the same opportunities. This completes one game turn, which represents 8 hours of the battle.

Leader counters added to a stack of counters can help those units fight more effectively. The Soviets must have air superiority before any paratroop drops can commence.

Optional rules include:

- Armor Superiority: Armored formations fight more effectively unless faced by offsetting units such as another armored unit or an antitank unit
- Divisional/corps integrity
- Partisans

== Publication history ==
Kanev was created by John Prados and was published by PWG in 1981 as a boxed set with cover art by Rodger B. MacGowan.

In 1987, Kanev was republished by World Wide Wargames (3W) as a free pull-out game in Issue 115 of Strategy & Tactics. In 1989 Hobby Japan published a Japanese-language version in Issue 6 of the Japanese magazine Tactics.

== Reception ==
In Issue 51 of the British wargaming magazine Perfidious Albion, Charles Vasey thought the concept of the game was good, pointing out, "you get panzers, Tiger tanks, paratroops, a river, the Eastern Front, and a Rodger MacGowan cover." However, Vasey thought despite the good concept, the actual production of the game was less than professional, noting, "this game is just crawling with missing rules, units and errata. Of course [PWG founder Jack Radey] is sending out his errata as quickly as he can, but how annoying for the gamer, and what a blow to the credibility of [PWG]. Much may be the fault of [designer John Prados] whose rules are, in my view, badly composed and thought-out." On the plus side, Vasey thought that Kanev "certainly has exciting elements of fluidity" but he also found "The game plays rather ploddingly and given the structure of the terrain, [repeated play] is likely to be rather samey." Vasey concluded, "Having said all that one does get some feeling for things. The Soviet must carefully mass his forces and winkle the Germans back by massed attacks on one or two points. The German has powerful stacks which properly handled can break-through and chase off the Russians."

In Issue 8 of BattlePlan, James Meldrum reviewed the 3W edition which had corrected many of the errors in the original PWG edition and noted, "Kanev is not only different [from other Easter Front wargames] (because it simulates a Russian parachute drop), but also wraps up all the usual kinds of actions found on the Russian front in a single game. Kanev features not only airborne operations, but also river crossings, armored engagements and pocketing actions." Meldrum felt that the game's only weakness was that it did not have multiple scenarios.

== Awards ==
At the 1987 Charles S. Roberts Awards, the 3W edition of Kanev was a finalist in two categories: "Best World War II Board Game", and "Best Wargame Graphics."

== Other reviews and commentary ==
- Fire & Movement #59 and #63
- The Wargamer Vol.2 #2
- The Wargamer Collector's Journal #4
- Nexus #11
- Wargame News #46
- Moves #59 (p24)
