= The Fast Carriers =

1975 WWII naval board wargame

The Fast Carriers, subtitled "Air-Sea Operations, 1941–77" is a board wargame published by Simulations Publications Inc. (SPI) in 1975 that simulates naval combat involving aircraft carriers from 1941 to the mid-1970s.

== Description ==
Fast Carriers is a two-player game in which both players control fleets centered on aircraft carriers and their combat aircraft. The game has strategic, operational and tactical aspects, with only the tactical game involving direct ship-to-ship or air-to-ship combat.

=== Components ===
The game includes:

- 22" x 34" paper hex grid tactical map
- 800 die-cut counters
- rule book
- 16 task force displays
- small six-sided die

=== Scenarios ===
The game comes with nine scenarios:

1. Attack on Pearl Harbor: a solitaire game designed to teach the rules
2. WW2 Pacific: Battle of Coral Sea
3. WW2 Pacific: The Battle of Midway
4. WW2: Battle of the Eastern Solomons
5. WW2 Pacific: Battle of the Santa Cruz Islands
6. WW2 Pacific: Battle of the Northern Solomons: a non-historical hypothetical scenario
7. Korean War
8. Vietnam War: Gulf of Tonkin incident
9. WW2 North Sea: Battle of the Denmark Strait

== Publication history ==
Fast Carriers was designed by Jim Dunnigan, with graphic design by Redmond A. Simonsen, and was published by SPI in 1975. It was a reasonably popular game; after its publication, Fast Carriers premiered at No. 2 on SPI's Top Ten Bestseller list, and remained on the list for eight months. In a 1977 poll undertaken by SPI to determine the most popular wargames on the market in North America, Fast Carriers placed a respectable 80th out of 202 games.

== Reception ==
In Issue 2 of Perfidious Albion, Geoff Barnard noted "The game tries very hard to be accurate and is fairly successful." Barnard thought using short range fighters as search aircraft was "an odd search system" and felt the tactical system was "rather stodgy." Barnard concluded, "Nevertheless, it contains a lot of good ideas." In the following issue, Charles Vasey disagreed to an extent, saying the game "has a splendid range of counters and an impressive amount of details, but was felt to be somewhat of a bore to play." Two issues later, Vasey commented that "the tactical system is a tremendous bore and of doubtful realism. I would certainly always use the tactical abstraction. Once one has grown accustomed to the weird [sic] search system the scenarios should prove fairly interesting. As a game Fast Carriers is only partially successful. One cannot however but be impressed with the immense range of counters."

In the March 1976 edition of Airfix Magazine, Bruce Quarrie liked the game, saying, "Fast Carriers is an excellent simulation of the organisational planning required for successful carrier warfare, and should have strong appeal for those who enjoy games demanding forethought and a clear methodical mind. Muddled thinkers won't stand a chance!"

In the 1977 book The Comprehensive Guide to Board Wargaming, game critic Charles Vasey called Fast Carriers a "Very big game [...] Very accurate if rather slow." He noted the game's "Many counters, complex system" but noted that the game was "cleanly designed." Nevertheless, he found the game overly complex and concluded, "Only for the real naval buff."

In Moves No. 26, Christopher Perleberg noted that large parts of the game were essentially administrative, and admitted that "The game can be 'long hours of boredom followed by a few minutes of sheer terror.'" He also warned that "The game requires a lot of space; each Player can have up to eight task forces, and each TF [task force] requires its own operational card." He also didn't like the lack of fog of war, pointing out that during the search phase, the players always know what they are looking for, unlike historical combat, when admirals had very little idea of what they would be facing. Perleberg had issues with some of the scenarios; for example, in the scenario simulating the famous Battle of Midway, where three Japanese carriers were sunk by dive bombers, Perleberg pointed out that the game rules only allowed a 0.05% chance of recreating that event. He spent some time suggesting a multitude of revisions to several scenarios. Perleberg concluded by admitting that random chance did play some part in the game, but "when one gets'right down to it, the winner in Fast Carriers is the one who knows his die and plays the 'percentages;' a Player can plan and plan and have his strikes miss, or find dummies or fail to inflict damage. So it's not to say that the game is all luck. Fast Carriers can teach a lot about carrier warfare in World War Two if one takes the time to learn and play it well."

In The Guide to Simulations/Games for Education and Training, Martin Campion warned teachers looking to use this game in the classroom that "The rules for manipulating all of this equipment are fairly complex but the whole game is rendered much easier than usual, for the complexity of the rules, by a set of players' aids [...] The game system requires the players to make many small decisions and leaves a lot of room for assigning multiple players to each side." Campion concluded, "This is a fast-moving, generally accurate game, which shows particularly the devastating effect of the use of aircraft and carriers in World War II."

== Other reviews and commentary ==
- Panzerfaust No. 75
- Fire & Movement No. 12 & No. 67
- JagdPanther No. 12, #13 & No. 15
- Strategy & Tactics No. 51
- The Wargamer Vol.1 No. 3 and Vol.1 No. 12
- American Wargamer Vol.3 No. 5
