= Michael Menzel =

German game designer and illustrator

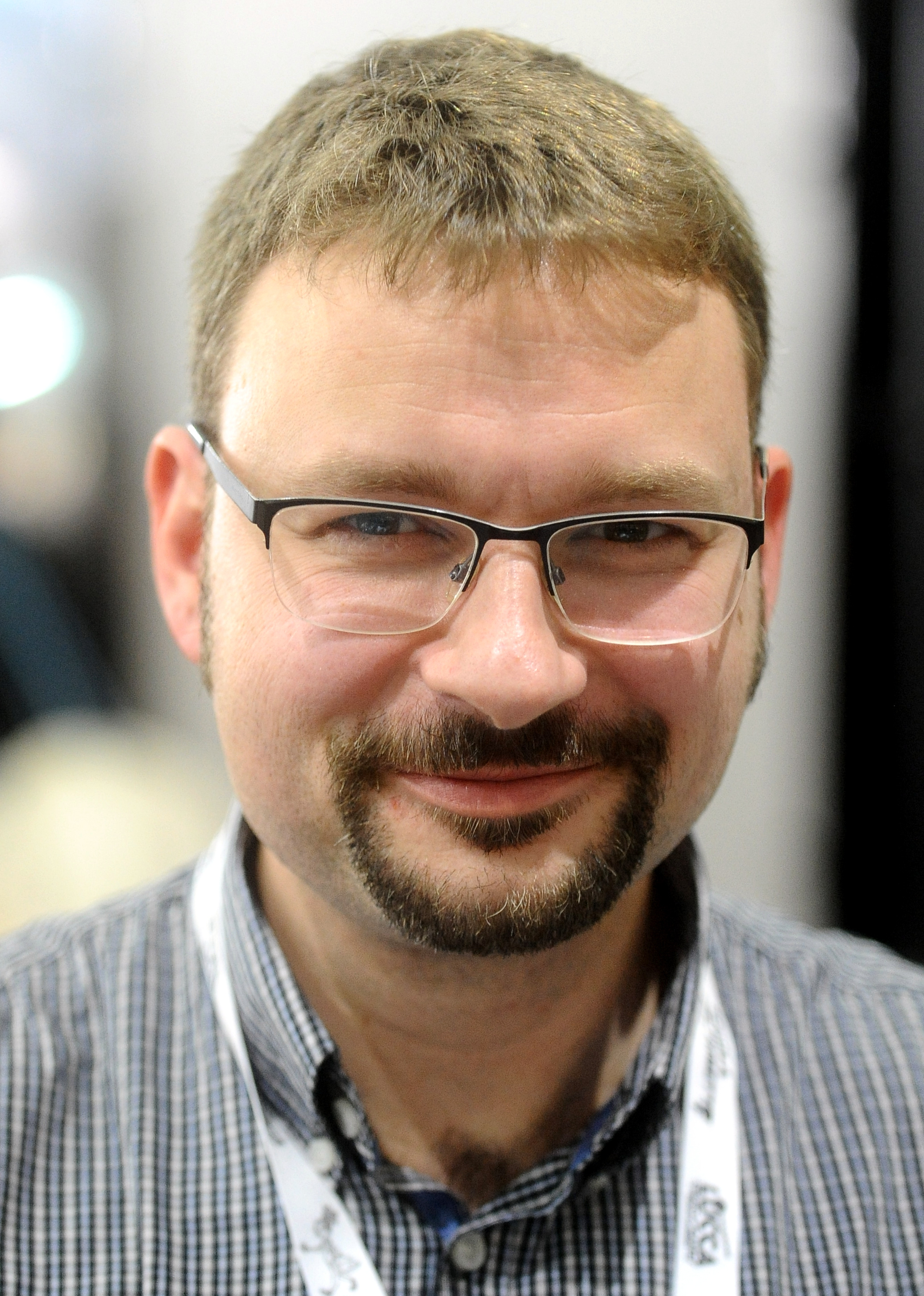
Michael Menzel at Lucca Comics & Games 2015

Michael Menzel is a German game artist and occasional game designer. As the designer of Legends of Andor, he won the Kennerspiel award.

Menzel is credited as an artist for over 300 board games or game items. He is known for creating detailed art for game boards.

Games for which Menzel has provided artwork include the following:

- 2004 Jambo
- 2006 Shogun
- 2006 The Pillars of the Earth
- 2006 Thurn and Taxis
- 2007 Cuba
- 2008 Dominion
- 2008 Stone Age
- 2009 Havana
- 2010 Catan, 2010 and later editions
- 2012 Legends of Andor
