= Santa Clara City Library =

Public library in Santa Clara, California

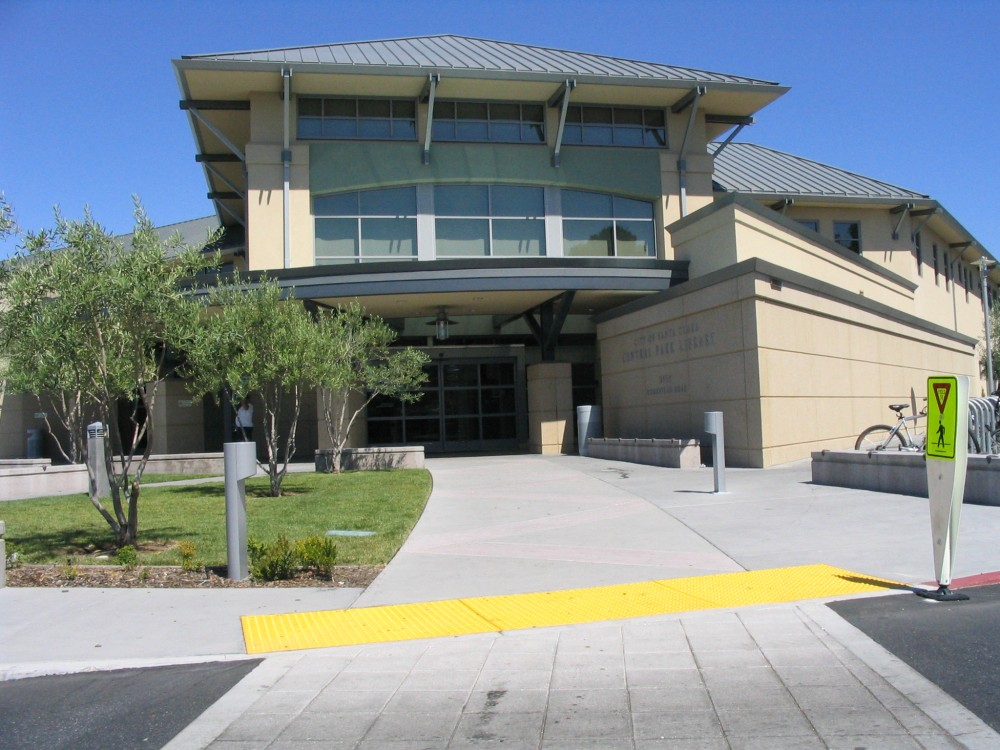
Central Park Library exterior

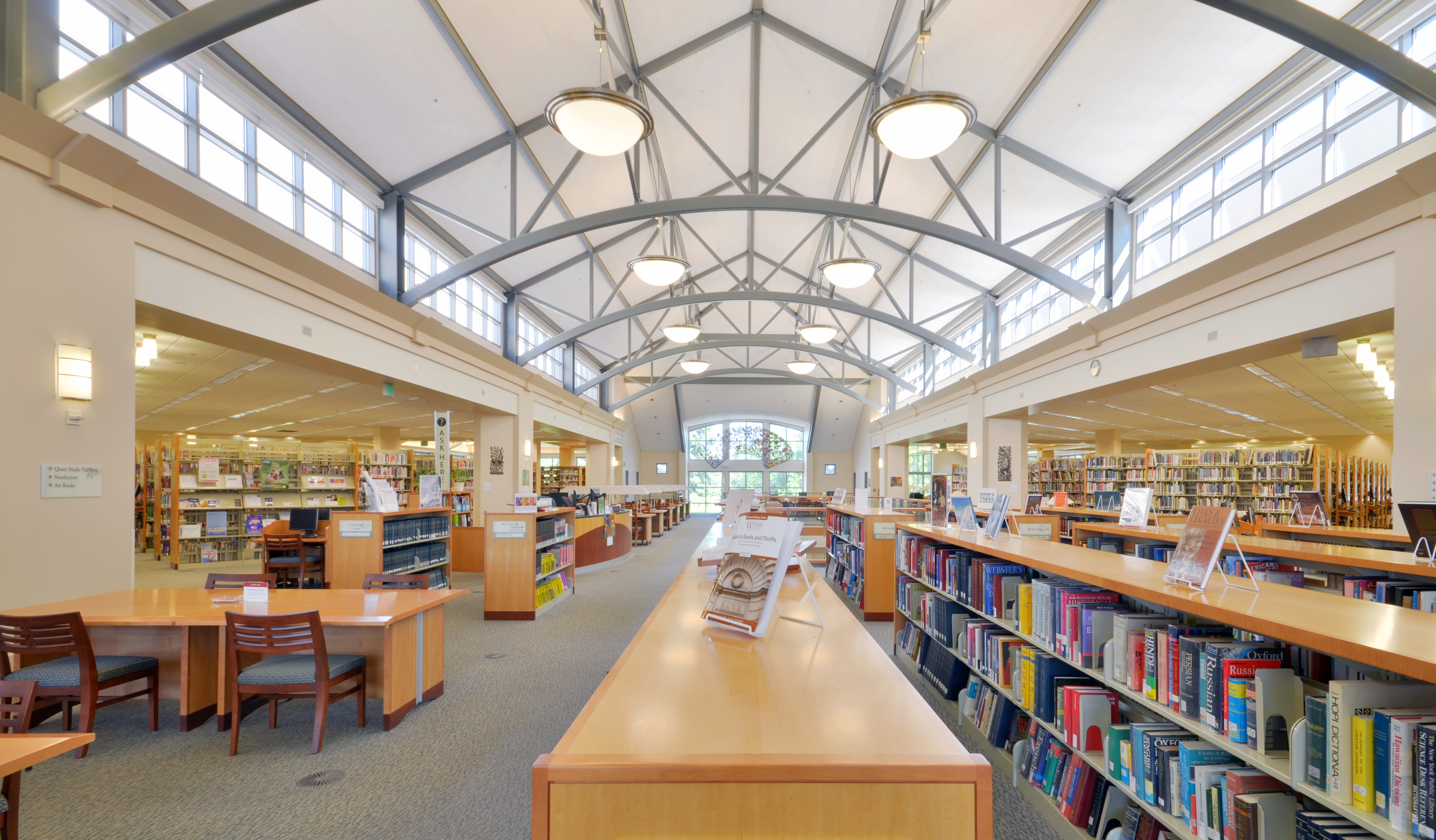
Central Park Library interior

Santa Clara City Library is a public library in Santa Clara, California. There are currently three locations: the Mission Branch Library; the Northside Branch Library, which opened on August 9, 2014; and the (main) Central Park Library.

== History ==
The library was originally located in two upstairs rooms in the Franck Building at 1047 Franklin Street, Santa Clara. It was established as a public library in fall 1903 by the Board of Town Trustees. It was later moved to the 2nd floor of the City Hall at Franklin and Washington Streets.

The Mission Branch Library building was completed in October 1955. The library is located at City Plaza Park, at the corner of Lexington and Main Streets. In 1999, the Mission Branch Library was closed for renovation and re-opened on November 16, 2000. It was remodeled again from December 2017 to September 2018.

On April 4, 1967, the new 36,000 square foot Central Park Library was opened to the public. After August 31, 2001, the Central Park Library was moved to a temporary building at 3345 Lochinvar Avenue. In 2004, the new Central Park Library was opened. The building is located at 2635 Homestead Road.

The Northside Branch Library is located at 695 Moreland Way. It is located north of Highway 101 in the Rivermark area of Santa Clara.

Santa Clara City Library did not hire a professional librarian until October 1953. Miss Frances Klune was the first hired professional librarian.

The old card catalog was replaced in 1992 with a new barcode system. The project was led by Karen Saunders with Jackie Stafford and Mary Ann Stafford.

== Programs ==
They hold many ongoing programs, such as family storytime, ESL conversation club, Friends of the Library book sale, anime film program, book discussion group, and genealogy research.

READ- Read Santa Clara is an adult and family literacy program that provides free literacy instruction for English-speaking adults who want to improve their basic reading, writing, and/or math skills.

They recently created several new programs:

- Holiday Craft Faire: Local vendors sell hand-crafted items, jewelry, cards and other gifts.
- Discover Santa Clara: Library cardholders can get discounts at selected Santa Clara City businesses.
- Project BEST: Basic Employment Skills Training- The library prepares students for the food handler certification. They held 26 food handler classes and 130 students obtained their food handler certification. They provided free career counseling, job workshops, and basic computer literacy workshops. They also held a job fair; 13 companies attended and there were 375 potential job seekers. They received a grant from the California State Library-Library Services and Technology Act (LSTA).
- Sustainable U: They had workshops in edible/ornamental gardens, electric vehicles/silicon valley power's solar express, and bread making. The Santa Clara Seed Share is a collection of seeds, which patrons can take for free and grow in their gardens. Santa Clara City Library is a pick up location for Eating with the Seasons; library patrons can receive a weekly bag of farm fresh produce. This program was supported in whole or in part by the U.S. Institute of Museum and Library Services under the provisions of the Library Services and Technology Act, administered in California by the State Librarian

In 2016, the Santa Clara City Library started hosting its own comic book convention, which is free.

== Services ==
The library includes many services, including circulation/accounts assistance, children’s services, Friends of the Library Bookstore, periodicals, reference, technology center, teen services, and the welcome desk

Kaiser Permanente Health & Wellness Collection: It includes medical/consumer health reference resources and free pamphlets on consumer health information. It is located on the 2nd floor of Central Park Library.

Genealogy and Local History: Works with the Santa Clara County Historical and Genealogical Society to maintain a genealogy collection in the heritage pavilion of the Central Park Library.

Home Heritage Collection: For library patrons who need ideas to maintain or renovate an old home. It includes titles on home improvement, furnishings, and interior decoration. The library also hold issues of This Old House magazine.

Activities for Basic Learning and Enjoyment (ABLE) Kits: Books and activity kits are given for developmentally disabled patrons at Mission Branch Library. These kits were funded by a grant from the Foundation and Friends of the Santa Clara City Library.

Early Literacy Stations: There are two early literacy stations at Mission Library for children ages two to eight years old. They have 37 educational software programs in English and Spanish. Children can learn science, music, drawing, and reading.
