= Power Grid =

Board game

- In Power Grid, players compete to build up electrical networks from scratch and be the player to power the most cities at the end of the game.
- Designers: Friedemann Friese
- Publishers: Rio Grande Games
- Players: 2 to 6
- Setup time: 10–15 minutes
- Playing time: 120+ minutes
- Chance: Low-medium (cards)
- Age range: 12 and up
- Skills: Buying, resource management

Power Grid is the English-language version of the second edition of the multiplayer German-style board game Funkenschlag, designed by Friedemann Friese and first released in 2004. Power Grid was released by Rio Grande Games.

In the game, each player represents a company which owns power plants and tries to supply electricity to cities. During the game, players bid on power plants and buy resources to provide electricity to the growing number of cities in their network.

== Background ==
Power Grid was developed from Funkenschlag, the original game, which had players draw their networks with crayons instead of playing on a fixed map. This and other changes were made when Friedemann Friese reworked the game. The new game is called Funkenschlag in the German market, but is sold under other names elsewhere.

== Gameplay ==
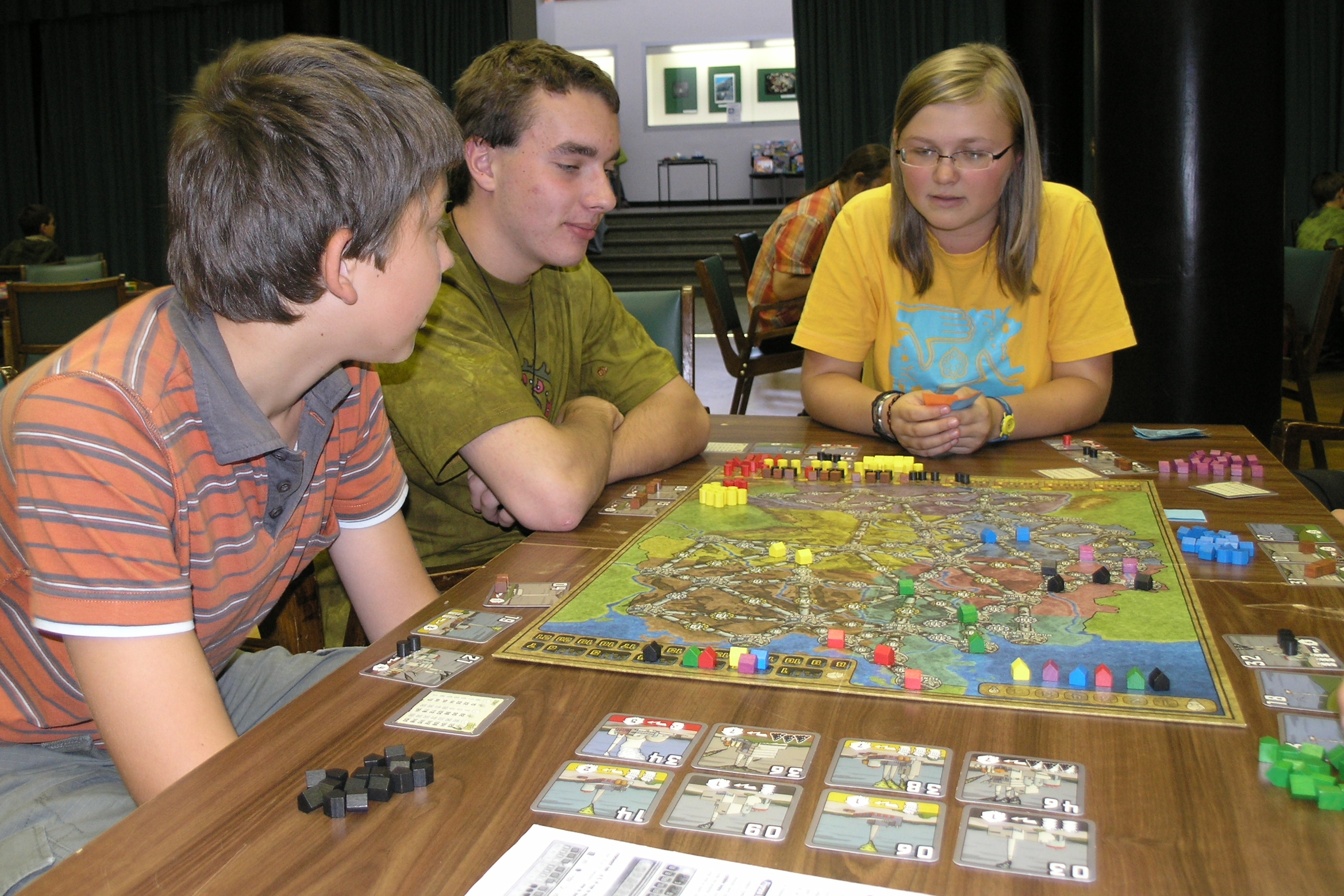
Players in Prague in 2008

The game comes with a double-sided board with a map of the United States on one side and Germany on the other. Both maps have six regions each, with the regions containing cities with possible connections of various costs between them. The number of regions used is based on the number of players. The map is a key strategic component, since some areas have generally higher connection costs than others.

Power Grid is played in rounds. Each round has five phases:

Determining turn order
Turn order is determined randomly at the beginning of the game. It is rearranged each round, according to the number of cities each player has connected. The player with the most connections goes first, followed by the player with the second-highest number of connections and so on. When players own the same number of connections, the player with the higher-value plant goes first.
Auctioning power plants
Turn order determines who starts bidding on power plants. A player may pass rather than bid on a plant, forfeiting their chance to bid on any other power plants in a round. An initial bid must be equal to, or higher, than the value of an available plant. After the initial bid, players bid in clockwise order until every player passes on an existing bid. When a plant is purchased, a new one is drawn from the deck to replace it; available plants are re-arranged by value. The player with the highest-priority turn order (which may still be the first player) then has the option to bid on an available plant. The phase ends when every player has purchased a plant or passed on an opportunity to bid on a plant. Most power plants require at least one coal, oil, garbage (see waste to energy), or uranium resource to supply electricity. Wind turbines and hydraulic plants do not require resources.
Buying resources
Players buy resources for their plants in reverse turn order. They can only purchase resources they can use, and each plant may only have twice the number of resources it needs to run; a plant which uses two oil can hold up to four oil. As resources are purchased, they become more expensive; the player who is last in turn order (the person with the fewest cities connected) can buy resources at the cheapest prices in that round.
Building
In reverse turn order, players may build into cities. In the first round, a player may build into any city which is not already occupied. They may expand by paying the cost to build into the desired city, plus the value of all connections to that city from an already-occupied city. No player may build into more than one slot in a city. Slot one costs 10 elektros, and is the only slot available during step one (see steps below). During step two the second slot is available for 15 elektros, and in step three the final slot is available for 20 elektros.
Bureaucracy
Players use resources to power their cities and earn more elektros based on the number of cities they power. Resources available for purchase are replenished at a rate based on the number of players in the game and the step. The most valuable power plant is placed at the bottom of the draw deck.

The game ends when one player builds a fixed number of cities, and the winner is the player who can supply electricity to the most cities with his network. In case of a tie, the player with the most money wins. If that results in a tie, the player with the most cities is the winner.

Power Grid is further divided into three steps. In step one eight power plants are visible to players, arranged in two rows of four based on reverse value. The first row (the least- valuable plants) is available for bidding. Only the first slot of a city may be connected. Step two begins when a player builds a set number of cities, determined by the number of players. The least-valuable available plant is removed from the game, and the second city slots are available for connection. Step three begins when the step-three card comes up in the power-plant deck after being initially placed at the bottom of the deck, and the least-valuable available plant is removed from the game. The available-power-plant pool is down to six, and the remaining-power-plant deck is shuffled to make a new draw deck.

== Editions ==
Power Grid is available under different names in different markets. Most have the same game play, but a few editions are slightly different because they have non-standard maps.

Funkenschlag (Power Grid)
The German and U.S. editions are virtually identical, with the same German or US maps. Small differences are unintentional consequences of the translation from German to English, and most errors have been corrected by Rio Grande Games in subsequent editions.
Funkenschlag: EnBW edition
Released in 2007 as a promotional tie-in with EnBW, a power company in the German state of Baden-Württemberg, its map differs from Funkenschlag's in Mannheim's replacement with nearby Karlsruhe (the location of EnBW's headquarters). The game's second map is of Baden-Württemberg. Player order is determined after the power-plant auction, and the power-plant deck has 41 plants instead of the original 42; plant #29 is omitted.
Vysoké napětí
The Czech-Slovak edition has Central European and German maps.
Mégawatts
The French edition has maps of France and Quebec. The Quebec map has more renewable power plants, reflecting its regional hydroelectricity.
Other editions
Power Grid is also available in Polish, Italian, Spanish, Dutch, Chinese, Korean, Portuguese, and Japanese. These editions have the original maps of Germany and the US and a map of each local publisher's home country.
10th anniversary deluxe edition
Released in 2014, it has redesigned wood pieces and cards and a double-sided board with Europe on one side and North America on the other, and replaces garbage (trash) with natural gas.

== Expansions ==
All expansions require the original game.

France and Italy
The France & Italy Expansion for Power Grid was released in 2005, with a double-sided map allowing play in France and Italy. Minor rule changes reflect the countries' power culture. France, which has embraced nuclear power, has an earlier start with atomic plants and more available uranium. Italy has fewer coal and oil resources, but more garbage.
Benelux and Central Europe
The Benelux & Central Europe Expansion was released in 2006. This expansion provides a new double-sided map, this time for play in Benelux and Central Europe. Again, there are small rule changes to reflect the power culture in these two regions. Benelux (Economic union of Belgium, the Netherlands, and Luxembourg) has more ecological power plants and more availability of oil. Central Europe (Poland, the Czech Republic, Austria, Slovakia, and Hungary) has rules changes in Steps 2 and 3, and limits on what type of power plant may be used to power cities in different regions (countries) of the map.
Power Plant Deck 2
Released at the Spiel game fair in Essen in 2007, the Power Plant Deck 2 expansion has a second set of power-plant cards for gameplay variety.
China and Korea
Released in 2008, the map expansion is for play in China and Korea. Minor rule changes reflect the region's power culture. In Korea, players have high connection costs. Because of the division of Korea, there are two resource markets. During each turn, a player must choose one market from which to buy resources; North Korea has fewer resources and no uranium. The Chinese market is a planned economy. The power plants on the market are offered in ascending order during the game's first two steps, and resources will probably to be in short supply as the game proceeds.
Brazil, Spain and Portugal
The Brazil/Spain & Portugal expansion (also known as Brazil/Iberia), released in 2009, has additional maps. In Brazil, biogas replaces garbage and resources are scarcer than in the original game. In Spain and Portugal side, uranium becomes important in step two.
Russia and Japan
Released in October 2010 with a restricted Russian power-plant market and different rules for exchanging out-of-date power plants. Based on Japan's two wide-area synchronous grids which run at different mains frequencies, players can begin two separate networks in that country.
The Robots
Released in November 2011, the expansion added 30 tiles for AI players used with two players.
Quebec and Baden-Württemberg
The Quebec/Baden-Württemberg expansion was released in 2012. Its maps were previously released in separate base games: Québec is part of Mégawatts (released by Filosofia) and Baden-Württemberg is included in Funkenschlag: EnBW.
Northern Europe, United Kingdom and Ireland
The Northern Europe/United Kingdom & Ireland expansion was released at Essen 2012. Another map expansion, it includes twelve new power-plant cards for Northern Europe. The seven North European countries use different energy sources, and the set of power plants depends on the region chosen. Players can operate two networks in the UK and Ireland, but starting a second network is expensive since there is no direct connection between Ireland and Great Britain.
Australia and Indian subcontinent
Released at Essen 2013, it contains regional maps. There are three networks and the maximum cost to connect two cities is 20 elektros, reducing the overall cost if a player is blocked in.
The Stock Companies
Players play one degree removed from the original game by being shareholders in companies that take actions in the game. Players can invest in multiple companies with the objective of earning the most money.

== Spin-offs ==
These are stand-alone games:

Power Grid: Factory Manager
Players own factories and try to earn the most money. Each player uses their workers to buy the best machines and robots on the market and run the machines most effectively. Players must monitor their energy consumption.
Power Grid: The First Sparks
Similar to the original game, but set in the Stone Age.
Power Grid: The Card Game
A card game version of Power Grid, without the network map.

== Reception ==
According to Martin Wallace, "I cannot say the game is definitively a classic. What I do know is that it still gets played regularly around the U.K. games scene. The vast majority of board games get dragged out once or twice and are then chucked to one side to collect dust until either auctioned or hidden in the loft by the better half. Power Grid has hung around because it has that certain something about it that makes you happy to sit down and play a game".

Awards
Year	Award
2005	Games Magazine Games 100 contest
2005	Spiel des Jahres (recommended)
2004	International Gamers Awards Best Strategy Game (nominee)
2004	Meeples' Choice Award (Top 3 of 2004)

== Reviews ==
- Pyramid
