= Warangel =

Warangel is a fantasy board wargame created and illustrated by Angelo Porazzi. It has won a number of Italian game awards, and is available worldwide through the official website www.warangel.it.

== History ==
The first edition was published in Italy in 1996 as a collectible series. In 2002 Hasbro Italy picked up the Warangel Card Game, a spin-off of the boardgame, created and illustrated by same author, for national distribution. In 2006 the boardgame celebrated the 10th anniversary with the Warangel 10 Years Edition, with English reference sheets of the first ten fantasy races in the game.

As of 2010 Warangel counts 120 different warrior races, each one with its hex map depicting a real sector of Earth. The game is now available with the service "Create YOUR Warangel" described on official website.

== Awards ==
In 2000 the first boxed edition was published, receiving four awards in four different conventions and game fairs:

- Best Italian Board Game in Ludex 2000 Bologna
- Best Italian Board Game in LuccaGames 2000
- Best Italian Wargame in MilanoGames 2000
- Best Italian self-produced Game in AcquiComics 2001
