= Korsun Pocket: Little Stalingrad on the Dnepr =

Board wargame

Box cover with art by Rodger B. MacGowan, 1979

Korsun Pocket: Little Stalingrad on the Dnepr is a board wargame published by People's War Games (PWG) in 1979 that simulates the Battle of Korsun–Shevchenkovsky during World War II.

== Background ==
Following several Soviet successes on the Eastern Front in mid-1943 that forced a general German retreat, German forces tried to stabilize their line along the Dnepr River. However, by early 1944 the Red Army had two large bridgeheads over the Dnepr, leaving a bulge in German lines. In January, 1944, two Soviet tank armies broke through German lines in depth and encircled two German corps. For three weeks, Soviet forces tried to destroy the surrounded Germans, while the Germans tried to break out in coordination with reinforcements trying to break the siege.

== Description ==
Korsun Pocket is a grand tactical and operational "monster" game (a game with more than a thousand counters) for two players (or two teams) in which one side controls the Germans, and the other side controls the Soviets. The double-sided counters show full strength on the front side and damaged/reduced strength on the reverse.

=== Components ===
The game box contains:

- four-piece 96" x 31" paper hex grid map scaled at 1 mi (1.6 km) per hex
- three 17" x 22" situation maps
- 2400 double-sided die-cut counters
- rule booklet
- small six-sided die
- various charts and player aids

=== Gameplay ===
The game uses rules systems from Wacht am Rhein (Simulations Publications Inc., 1977) with some additions and modifications. Each day of game time takes three turns (two day turns and one night turn.)

==== Movement ====
Winter weather, which can be determined randomly, can have a powerful effect on movement. Various classes of units have different movement allowances which are used at different rates for various terrain. Various units have strong or weak zones of control. Strong zones force a unit to stop. Weak zones allow units to move at the cost of a movement penalty.

==== Combat ====
Combat is very complex, with fifteen different factors that can affect combat results. The game also has Air rules very similar to Wacht am Rhein.

==== Supply ====
The detailed supply system moves supplies from off-map to supply dumps and thence to fighting units.

=== Scenarios ===
The game offers seven scenarios based on various parts of the battle, using 1, 2, or all 4 maps. There is also a campaign game of 72 turns to fight the whole battle.

== Publication history ==
After SPI published Wacht am Rhein in 1977, amateur game designer Jack Radey started to create Korsun Pocket based on the same rules systems. Radey started up PWG in order to self-publish the game, and demonstrated a playtest of the game at Origins '78. He returned to Origins in 1979 to sell copies of the game packaged in ziplock bags with graphic design by Ina Clausen. The rules had not been yet been printed, and purchasers were mailed a copy of the rulebook some weeks after the convention. Later in 1979, PWG released a boxed set with cover art by Rodger B. MacGowan, .

Radey helped to develop a computer game for Microsoft Windows based on the board game. Decisive Battles of WWII: Korsun Pocket was published by Strategic Studies Group in 2003.

Some years after its original publication, Radey revised and simplified the supply and air rules, and provided a more accurate order of battle. The result was the second edition, Korsun Pocket 2, which was published in 2022 by Pacific Rim Publishing.

== Reception ==
In his 1980 book The Best of Board Wargaming, Nicholas Palmer called the self-published game "a fully professional product that maintains a high standard of historical accuracy, and while comments in the rules often betray a certain bias towards the Soviet point of view, the balance of the historical simulation is perfectly fair." Palmer noted the use of the Wacht am Rhein game rules, but found that "many original ideas have been added to the system with considerable success." He warned of the game's complexity, commenting, "In many games more than two players are needed to operate all the detail of the rules." Palmer concluded by giving the game an "excitement" grade of 70%, saying, "The game is playable, if hard work. Maps, counters and rules are, however, so full of historical colour that Korsun Pocket remains fascinating in spite of its complexity."

In Issue 26 of Phoenix, Geoff Barnard noted that "While Korsun Pocket is an amateur design, it is in all respects apart from design philosophy, a professional product." He did note that it takes three sources to set up a scenario: the small-scale set-up mapsheet, the Order of Battle table, and a Losses table that delineates what losses have been suffered to that particular date. He found the rulebook a "more narrative than legalistic style" but found it difficult to find specific rules when needed. He also commented on the complexity of the game, noting that "Korsun Pocket is utter hard work, a veritable slogging match." He concluded, "If you can organise a multi-player game Korsun Pocket will provide a magnificent adventure. It should not be denigrated because of its sheer mass as within its chosen counter/time/map scale it is a massive situation."

In Issue 50 of Moves, Steve List reviewed the original ziplock bag version and noted "A great deal of unit functional differentiation is made, and detail rules abound." Although List admitted that this was not a professionally-produced game, "The game appears to be a labor of love, and aside from the fact that the ziplock bag is a shipping container, not a storage device, it is well done physically."

== Awards ==
In 1979, Korsun Pocket was a Game Designers' Guild Select Award Winner.

== Other reviews and commentary ==
- Strategy & Tactics #78
- Perfidious Albion #42 (p2-7)
