= Magic Wood =

1979 board game

Magic Wood is a 1979 board game published by International Team. When it first appeared in the U.S., the suggested retail price of the game was $17.95, considerably more than many other board games of the time.

== Gameplay ==
Magic Wood is a game in which elves, gnomes, goblins, and trolls all work to capture one another using foxes, ferrets, and martens for help. There are no dice; each player is simply given a move of seven that can be divided between any of the pieces the player currently has.

== Reception ==
In the May 1980 edition of Dragon (Issue 37), William Fawcett found the gameplay of Magic Wood to be too simplistic and the graphics too childish to appeal to devoted gamers. He thought the rules booklet was "a poor translation from the Italian, and it took me several readings to figure out a playable set of rules. This is perhaps the game’s greatest failing... Many areas are not covered or left ambiguous and unclear." Due to its childish simplicity and high price, Fawcett did not recommend the game, saying, "Considering the high price tag of Magic Wood, most gamers will probably decide that there are better games that will offer more challenge and variety for the money."

In the January 1981 edition of The Space Gamer (Issue No. 35), Elisabeth Barrington found the game to be suitable only for a younger audience, and recommended it "to gamers 6-12 years of age."
