= Leo Colovini =

Italian game designer

Leo Colovini is an Italian designer of German-style board games born in Venice 1964. His most popular game is Cartagena. He is one of the few top board game designers who has owned a game store.

His life in games was strongly influenced by meeting Alex Randolph at the age of 12 with whom he worked on several of his games. He has also been part of studiogiochi, an Italian games company, and has also collaborated with Dario De Toffoli and has written books on games.

== List of Games ==
Complete list of games that Colovini has created:

2011
- Atlantis - Schnupper-Spiel
- Tricky
- Het Huis Anubis
- Dobbelduel
- Atlantis - Ikarus
- Cartagena.app
- Draco
- Geizen
- Elefant memory

2010
- Horseland
- Sherlock

2009

- Donna Leon: special cards
- Donna Leon: Gefährliches Spiel
- Atlantis - Variante Schiffe
- Atlantis

2008
- Star Wars - Das letzte Gefecht with Marco Maggi, Francesco Nepitello
- De Gouden Eeuw con Giuseppe Baù
- Wall-e - ein Geschenk für Eva with Federico Colovini
- Star Wars - Galaktische Schlachten with Marco Maggi, Francesco Nepitello
- Islas Canarias

2007
- Foot2Rue
- Sieben auf einen Streich with Fabio Visintin
- Totally spies with Dario De Toffoli
- Trova le mine with Dario De Toffoli, Dario Zaccariotto
- Wikinder with Federico Colovini
- Wikinger Bande with Alessandra Nove Veronesi
- Savana with Alessandra Nove Veronesi

2006
- Mauer Bauer
- Cartagena 2
- Dschingis Khan
- Nebraska with Dario De Toffoli
- Babar et le mistère des lettres perdues with Dario De Toffoli
- Justinianus with Alessandro Saragosa
- Kakuro Challenge with Dario De Toffoli, Dario Zaccariotto
- Kakuro with Dario De Toffoli, Dario Zaccariotto

2005
- Go West
- Challenge Sudoku with Dario Zaccariotto, Dario De Toffoli
- Holidays
- Mango Tango with Dario De Toffoli
- Sudoku with Dario De Toffoli, Dario Zaccariotto
- Challenge Sudoku - Kakuro Challenge with Dario De Toffoli, Dario Zaccariotto
- Carcassonne - the Discovery with Klaus-Jürgen Wrede

2004
- Druids
- Submarine
- Tempo
- Honesti-Disonesti with Stefano Cavanè
- Number One with Alex Randolph, Dario De Toffoli, Renato De Rosa

2003
- Inkognito The card game with Alex Randolph
- Minestrone with Francesco e Luisa Cognetti
- Ketch up with Dario De Toffoli
- Alexandros
- Collection with Francesco e Luisa Cognetti
- Corsari
- Die Brücken von Shangrila
- Avalon
- Magna Grecia with Michael Schacht
- Familien Bande
- Hektor und Achill with Marco Maggi, Francesco Nepitello
- Da che pARTE stai? with Dario Zaccariotto

2002
- Clans

2001

- Meridian
- Vabanque with Bruno Faidutti

2000
- Yummy with Dario De Toffoli
- Doge
- Carolus Magnus
- Cartagena
- Venezia 1848 with Marco Maggi, Francesco Nepitello

1999
- Il grande gioco del compleanno

1998

- Dummy with Dario De Toffoli
- Europa 1945/2030 with Duccio Vitale
- Theseus with Dario De Toffoli

1997
- Top Hats

1996

- Mini Inkognito with Alex Randolph
- I giochi della frutta with Dario De Toffoli
- Lex Arcana - Carthago with Marco Maggi, Francesco Nepitello

1994
- Die Oster Insel () with Alex Randolph

1993

- Lex Arcana - Germania with Dario De Toffoli, Marco Maggi, Francesco Nepitello
- Lex Arcana - Schermo del demiurgo (1993) with D. De Toffoli, F. Nepitello, M. Maggi
- Lex Arcana with Dario De Toffoli, Marco Maggi, Francesco Nepitello

1990
- Die Magische Sieben

1988

- Inkognito with Alex Randolph

1986

- Drachenfels with Alex Randolph

Books
- Il grande libro degli scacchi (2009) with Dario De Toffoli
- Brainquiz (2008) with Dario De Toffoli, Dario Zaccariotto
- I giochi nel cassetto (2002)

His games are known for their simplicity and drama as this quote from Board Game Geek illustrates: "Carcasonne: The Discovery is also the simplest and most vanilla of the Carcassonnes. (Of course, if you know anything about Leo Colovini, you'd expect that.) But, it also the most tense Carcassonne. (And if you know Mr. Colovini, you also knew THAT!)"
