= Games 100 =

Award from Games Magazine

The Games 100 is an annual feature of Games magazine, a United States magazine devoted to games and puzzles. The Games 100 first appeared in the November/December 1980 issue as an alphabetic list of the 100 games preferred by the editors of the magazine. In 1981, Games introduced The Games 100 Contest, which involved identifying pieces from games listed in the Games 100, with the grand prize being more than half of the games on that list. Games continues to publish this list as "The Buyers Guide to Games", broken out into "The Traditional Games 100" and "The Electronic Games 100".

Lists are published in either the November or December issue. (There was no list in 1990, because Games was out of print when the list would have been published.) Through 1994, the lists for a year were published at the end of that year. Starting in 1995, lists for the prior year are released at the end of a year. (This means that there was no list published in 1995, as it would have been a repeat of the games of 1994.) There are several categories for which "best" games are determined.

The winner of the historical category for approximately the last ten years has been determined by one individual, Walt O'Hara, who runs the Historicon miniatures convention.

== Winning titles ==
Year	Game of the Year	Abstract strategy	Advanced strategy	Family	Family card	Family strategy	Party	Puzzle	Word	Historical simulation	Other
1991	Trumpet	Master Labyrinth	-	Stack	Arcade: Wing Commander	Real-Life Strategy: Sherlock Holmes Consulting Detective	Tabloid Teasers/Guesstures	3 In Three	'Swoggle	War/Adventure: HeroQuest	Trivia: Play It By Ear
1992	Pipeline	Terrace	-	Showdown Yahtzee	Arcade: Super Tetris	Real-Life Strategy: D-Day	Humm…ble	Heaven & Earth	Wordsters	Adventure: The Lost Files of Sherlock Holmes	Trivia: Times To Remember
1993	Inklings	Char	-	Perpetual Notion	Arcade: Ecco the Dolphin	Real-Life: Civilization	Oodles	The Incredible Machine	Pick Two!	Adventure: Return to Zork	Trivia: Celebrity Challenge
1994	Myst	The Game of Y	Wargames: V for Victory	Peg Poker	Arcade: Lode Runner: The Legend Returns	Real-Life Strategy: UFO: Enemy Unknown (known as X-Com: UFO Defense in North America	The Doonesbury Game	BreakThru!	Boggle Master	Adventure: The Elder Scrolls: Arena	Trivia: Quote Unquote
1995	Sharp Shooters	Strategy: Quixo	Conflict: Colonial Diplomacy	Touché	Phantoms of the Ice	Sports: Dynasty League Baseball	Catch Phrase	Lights Out	Pre.fix	Adventure & Role Playing: Dragon Dice: Battle Box	Trivia: Chronicles; CCG: On the Edge CCG: Standard Starter Deck
1997	25 Words or Less	Transpose	Strategy & Conflict: Field Command	Mole in the Hole	6 nimmt!	Priceless	Last Chance	Deluxe Lights Out	Bethump'd With Words	Adventure & Role-Playing: Dragonlance: Fifth Age	Trivia: Origins
1998	Quoridor	Balanx	Strategy & Conflict: Princess Ryan's Star Marines	Take It Easy	Get the Goods	Quandary	Wise and Otherwise	Lost in a Jigsaw	A to Z	-	Trivia: Director's Cut; CCG: Magic: The Gathering - Portal
1999	Fossil	GIPF	Conflict: Atlantic Storm	Montgolfiere	Bohnanza	El Grande	Say When!!	Stormy Seas	Alpha Blitz	-	Trivia: Where in Time is Carmen Sandiego? CCG: C 23
2000	Torres	Octi	Memory: Mamma Mia	Moonshot	Buried Treasure	Tikal	Apples to Apples	Ricochet Robot	Double Quick!	-	Trivia: Bioviva; CCG: Pokémon; Dexterity: Spintrek
2001	Aladdin's Dragons	ZÈRTZ	The Princes of Florence	Café International	Hellrail	Web of Power	Democrazy	Lunar Lockout	-	Paths of Glory	Two-Player Card: Caesar & Cleopatra; Dexterity: Carabande
2002	Evo	Morisi	Java	Africa	Babel	Lord of the Rings	Hilarium	Flip-It!	My Word!	Drive on Paris	Manual Dexterity: Space Game
2003	DVONN	Pueblo	Puerto Rico	Emerald	Vom Kap Bis Kairo (From Cape to Cairo)	Mexica	Moods	Nemesis Factor	-	Wilderness War	Manual Dexterity: Villa Paletti
2004	New England	Clans	Wildlife	I'm the Boss!	Queen's Necklace	Zoosim	Party/Trivia: Dibs	River Crossing	Crossword Pyramids	Hammer of the Scots	Two-Player Card: Balloon Cup
2005	BuyWord	YINSH	Tahuantinsuyu: The Rise of the Inca Empire	Vanished Planet	Victory & Honor	Alexandros	Party/Trivia: Cranium Hoopla	-	-	Memoir '44	-
2006	Australia	Project Kells	Louis XIV	Der Untergang von Pompeji (Escape from Pompeii)	Die Weinhändler (The Wine Merchants)	Primordial Soup (a.k.a. Ursuppe)	Party/Trivia: Snorta!	Tipover	-	Friedrich	Two-Player: Jambo
2007	Vegas Showdown	PÜNCT	Reef Encounter	Tricky Town	Trump, Tricks, Game!	Hacienda	Wits and Wagers	Gordian's Knot	Parlay	Silent War	-
2008	Pillars of the Earth	Easter Island	Khronos	If Wishes Were Fishes	Bull in a China Shop	Shear Panic	Gift Trap	Sacred Myths and Legends Series	Unspeakable Words	Ran	-
2009	Tzaar	Ponte del Diavolo	Key Harvest	Pandemic	Palast Geflüster (Palace Whisperings)	Stone Age	Go Nuts!	Doris	Jumbulaya	Pacific Typhoon	-
2010	Small World	Blox	Le Havre	Roll Through the Ages: The Bronze Age	Amerigo	Dominion/Dominion Intrigue (Expansion)	Dixit	La Ora Stelo	-	Fields of Fire	-
2011	Jump Gate	Arimaa	Egizia	Burger Joint	Jaipur	Valdora	Telestrations	Anti-Virus	-	Battles of Napoleon: The Eagle and the Lion	-
2012	Tikal II: The Lost Temple	Confusion: Espionage and Deception in the Cold War	Die Burgen von Burgund (The Castles of Burgundy)	Lemming Mafia	Hey Waiter!	Glen More	Funfair	IQ Twist	Pathwords	Command and Colors: Napoleonics	-
2013	Trajan	Matter	Village	Takenoko	Decktet/Decktet Book	Zong Shi	Pluckin' Pairs	Cool Circuits	Kerflip!	-	-
2014	Garden Dice/The Card Expansion	Kulami	Tzolk'in: The Mayan Calendar	Via Appia	Morels	Triassic Terror	Homestretch: Race to the Finish	Laser Maze	-	-	-

== Hall of Fame ==
Part of the Buyer's Guide includes a hall of fame for "games that have met or exceeded the highest standards of quality and play value and have been continuously in production for at least 10 years; i.e., classics."

This Hall of Fame includes:

- Acquire
- Apples to Apples
- Axis & Allies
- Blockhead!
- Bridgette
- Civilization
- Cluedo (Clue)
- Diplomacy
- Dungeons & Dragons
- Magic: The Gathering (inducted in the 2004 Buyer's Guide)
- Mille Bornes (inducted in the 1991 Games 100)
- Monopoly
- Othello
- Pente (inducted in the 1991 Games 100)
- Risk
- Scrabble Crossword Game
- The Settlers of Catan (inducted in the 2006 Buyer's Guide)
- Sorry!
- Stratego
- Taboo (inducted in the 2001 Buyer's Guide)
- TriBond (inducted in the 2001 Buyer's Guide)
- Trivial Pursuit
- Twister (inducted in the 1991 Games 100)
- TwixT (not included in the 1999 and 2000 Buyer's Guides due to temporary discontinuance of production)
- Yahtzee
