= 2004 in games =

This page lists board and card games, wargames, miniature games, and tabletop role-playing games published in 2004. For video games, see 2004 in video gaming.

== Games released or invented in 2004 ==
- A/state
- Allegiance: War of Factions
- Axis & Allies (fourth edition, originally released in 1984)
- Axis & Allies: D-Day
- Babylon 5:A Call to Arms
- Battlestations
- Beer Money
- Betrayal at House on the Hill
- Blue Moon
- Boomtown
- BuyWord
- Call of Cthulhu Collectible Card Game
- Candamir: The First Settlers
- Carcassonne: The City
- Castles & Crusades (role-playing game)
- Chez Goth
- d20 Future (role-playing game supplement)
- D6 Space (role-playing game)
- Dark Champions (role-playing game)
- Destination London
- Digimon card game
- Dogs in the Vineyard (role-playing game)
- Doom: The Boardgame
- Dragonball GT Trading Card Game
- Duel Masters Trading Card Game
- Dungeon Twister
- Ex Machina (role-playing game)
- Familienbande
- Friedrich
- Gettysburg
- Great War at Sea: Cruiser Warfare
- Great Wat at Sea: Dreadnoughts
- Ingenious
- InuYasha Trading Card Game
- Jambo
- Landslide
- Mechamorphosis (role-playing game)
- Memoir '44
- Memoir '44 - Overlord
- Monastyr (role-playing game)
- Niagara
- Omlevex (role-playing game supplement)
- Panzer Grenadier: Beyond Normandy
- Panzer Grenadier: Desert Rats
- Panzer Grenadier: Jungle Fighting
- Piranha Pedro
- Pirates of the Spanish Main
- Power Grid
- Reef Encounter
- Risk Godstorm
- Russian Rails
- Saint Petersburg
- San Juan (a card game based upon the board game Puerto Rico)
- The Shadow of Yesterday (role-playing game)
- Star Wars Miniatures
- Super Scrabble
- Swipe
- Third Reich/Great Pacific War Player's Guide
- Tibet: The Roleplaying Game
- Ticket to Ride
- War of the Ring
- WARS Trading Card Game
- Wings of War

== Game awards given in 2004 ==
- Gamer's Choice Award (Origins Awards): Babylon 5: A Call to Arms
- International Gamers Award: Memoir '44
- Schweizer Spielepreis: Ingenious
- Spiel des Jahres: Ticket to Ride (German: Zug im Zug)
- Games: BuyWord

== Deaths ==
Date	Name	Age	Notability
February 23	Samuel Edward Konkin III	56	Philosopher and frequent contributor to RPG publications
April 27	Alex Randolph	81	Board game designer
September 4	Bruce Quarrie	57	Wargaming author
December 12	Perry Grant	80	Screenwriter who also designed board games

== See also ==
- 2004 in video gaming
