= Habermaaß =

German toy and furniture manufacturer

Habermaass GmbH & Co. KG
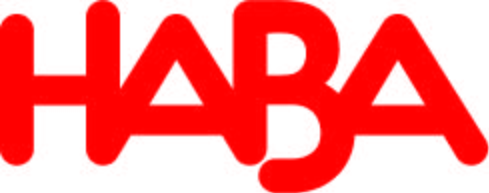
- Formerly: Habermaaß GmbH; Haba Sales GmbH & Co. KG
- Type: GmbH & Co. KG
- Industry: Toys, games, furniture
- Founded: 1938 in Bad Rodach, Germany
- Founder: Eugen Habermaaß
- Headquarters: Bad Rodach, Germany
- Area served: International
- Key people: Mario Wilhelm (managing director)
- Products: Wooden and textile toys, board, card and party games, puzzles, furniture and educational materials
- Brands: Haba, Wehrfritz
- Revenue: €216.2 million (2023)
- Number of employees: 2,000 (2023)
- Website: habermaass.de

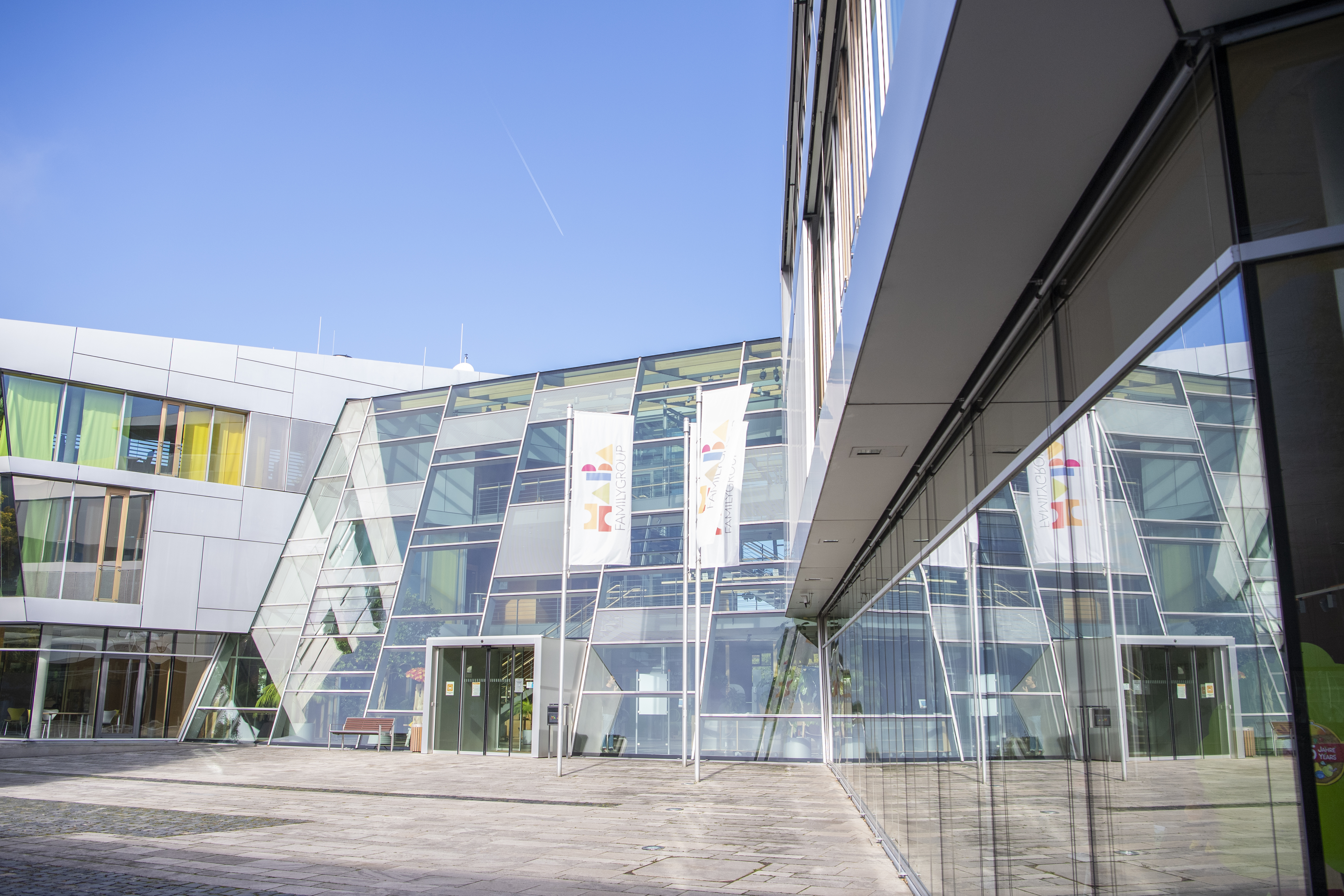
Headquarters of the Habermaass family of companies in Bad Rodach

Habermaass GmbH & Co. KG (formerly 'Habermaaß GmbH'; commonly referred to as 'Haba') is a German manufacturer of games, toys and furniture based in Bad Rodach in the district of Coburg, Upper Franconia, Bavaria. Under the umbrella of the Habermaass family of companies (German: Habermaass Firmenfamilie) it combines the brands Haba and Wehrfritz, which produce wooden and textile toys, board, card and party games, puzzles, as well as furniture and teaching and learning materials for day-care centres and schools. The group also includes the Habermaass Stiftung (Habermaass foundation). The company has been family-owned since its founding in 1938.

In 2023 the group generated revenue of €216.2 million and employed around 2,000 people.

== History ==
=== Founding and early years ===
The merchant Eugen Habermaaß (born 1901 in Tübingen) came to Rodach near Coburg in 1938, by way of Neustadt bei Coburg, where in the 1930s he had worked as an authorised signatory (Prokurist) at the company O. & M. Hausser, and Bayreuth, where he had been a director of the Bayerische Ostmark trading guild. In April 1938, he acquired one half of a factory for finely polished wooden goods from the entrepreneur Anton Engel for 25,000 Reichsmark. In the same month, Habermaaß and Engel, together with the merchant Karl Wehrfritz, founded the wholesale company Wehrfritz & Co.

Karl Wehrfritz left six months later. In 1940, Anton Engel withdrew from the business, which was converted into a limited partnership under the name Habermaaß & Co. Eugen Habermaaß became managing partner and his wife Luise a co-partner. During World War II the company produced transport and ammunition crates for the Wehrmacht, as well as wooden model vehicles and tanks for training purposes. In 1945, the company was placed under trustee administration by the U.S. military government for one year. When Eugen Habermaaß died unexpectedly in 1955, his wife took over the management. Around the same time, their son and later managing director Klaus Habermaaß began an apprenticeship as a cabinetmaker. After completing his engineering studies in 1961, he took an active role in the business.

=== International subsidiaries and product expansion ===
The company began to expand in 1980, when the American company Skaneateles Handicrafters was purchased by Habermaaß Inc. Later renamed T. C. Timber, the operation was finally renamed Habermaass Corp. Inc. in 2002. In the meantime a French subsidiary, Haba SARL, was established near Paris in 1993 and existed until 2024. In 2005, Haba UK followed as a site in the United Kingdom, and in 2011, a subsidiary in Hong Kong (Haba Asia), which was deconsolidated at the end of 2023 in the course of the insolvency.

To broaden its product range, the group founded Jako-o GmbH in 1987, a mail-order business for children's fashion, toys and accessories, which added the Fit-z! and Qiéro! sales divisions in 2004. In 2009, Habermaaß acquired Project Schul- und Objekteinrichtungen GmbH, a manufacturer of school furniture in Eisleben. In February 2015, the group acquired the children's app developer Fox and Sheep, which was sold again in 2020. Since 1 January 2020, Haba also wholly owned the Haba Digitalwerkstätten (Haba Digital Workshops), which Verena Pausder had initially co-founded in 2016.

In 2021, the group's US business acquired the online retailer Bella Luna Toys and the Oompa brand. Bella Luna Toys, founded in 2002 as an online source for Waldorf toys and supplies, moved its order fulfilment to Skaneateles, New York, where Haba USA is based.

=== Restructuring and establishment of the foundation ===
In 2013, the group had around 2,000 employees, and total revenue had been €354 million in 2012. In 2017, the company changed the spelling of its name from Habermaaß GmbH to Habermaass GmbH.

In 2019, Klaus Habermaaß also established the Stiftung für Natur und Kinder – Klaus Habermaass, which supports regional and national projects for nature and children. Since 2025, the foundation has been operating as Habermaass Stiftung.

=== Insolvency and restructuring ===
Because of economic difficulties, Haba closed all sites of its Digitalwerkstatt in April 2023, announced the elimination of about 650 full-time positions in July 2023, and in August 2023 announced the discontinuation of the Jako-o baby and children's fashion division. Jako-o had long-standing economic problems and, at the beginning of 2023, suffered drops in revenue during the changeover from outdated software to SAP. On 12 September 2023, the company filed for insolvency in self-administration.

On 12 December 2023, the restructuring plan was announced. The business was to be reorganised around the brands Haba for children's toys and Haba Pro (formerly Wehrfritz) for furniture and equipment for day-care centres. Around 1,000 employees were expected to remain. A total of 450 dismissed employees were offered transfer to a transfer company (German: Transfergesellschaft) which would operate for six months. Since the summer of 2023, about 200 employees had left the company through job fairs or on their own initiative. The school-furniture plant in Eisleben was sold to Mansfeld Anlagenbau und Umwelttechnik AG effective 1 January 2024. The company ended the self-administration insolvency proceedings on 1 March 2024. For the discontinued Jako-o children's clothing brand, a licence was granted to a textile manufacturer that continues the brand in functional clothing and textile accessories. A further reduction of nearly 100 employees was announced in August 2024, and in autumn 2025, another 50 employees were affected. Also in 2025, Haba Pro was renamed Wehrfritz again.

== Company structure ==
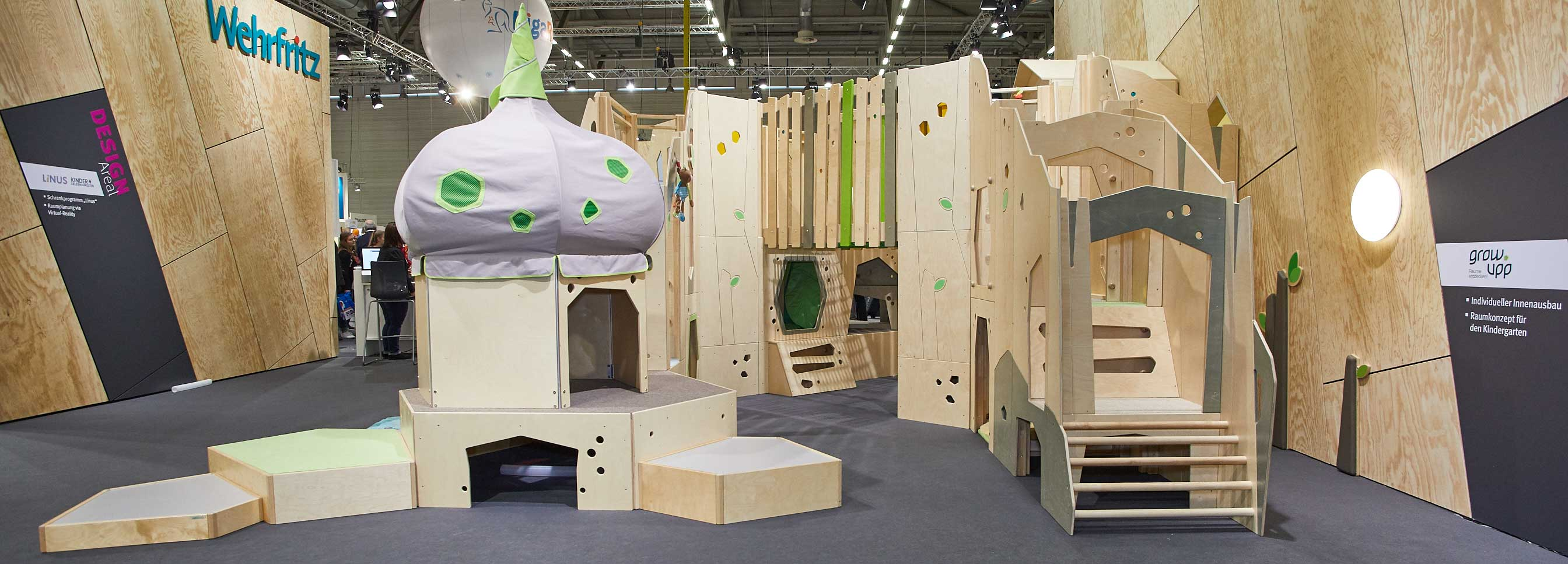
Wehrfritz products at the Didacta trade fair in Cologne, 2019

Habermaass is a GmbH & Co. KG and generated revenue of €216.2 million in 2023. Mario Wilhelm became managing director of the family group in 2023. Since its founding in 1938, the company's production site has been in Bad Rodach in Upper Franconia, a few kilometres from the border with Thuringia. The business and the activities of all subsidiaries are directed from there. The company operates internationally and sells its products in Germany and abroad, with further subsidiaries in Europe, Asia and the United States. The group includes the brands Haba and Wehrfritz as well as the Habermaass Stiftung. In the US, the group also sells toys under the Bella Luna Toys brand.

=== Haba ===
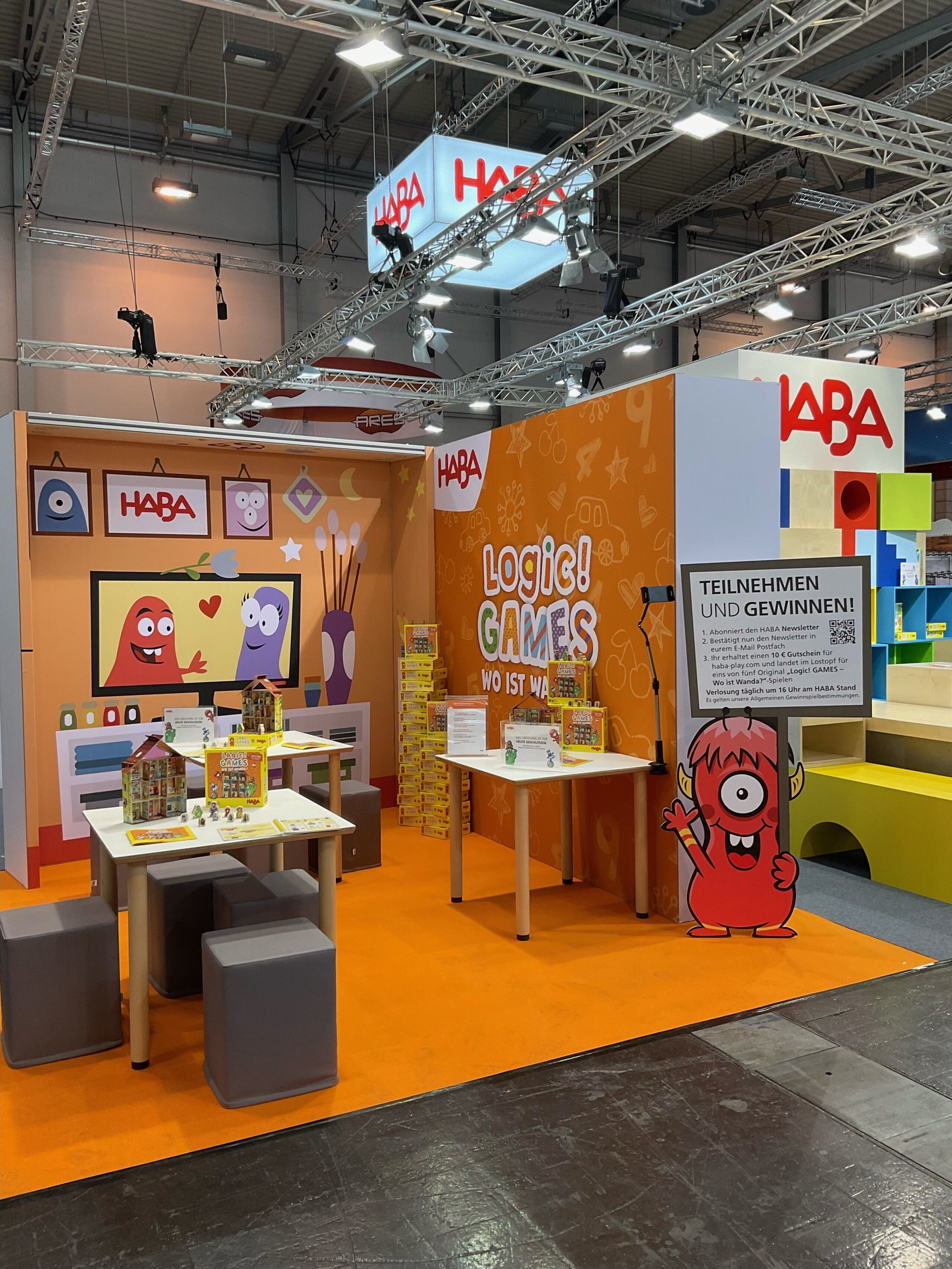
Haba stand at the Spiel game fair in Essen, 2022

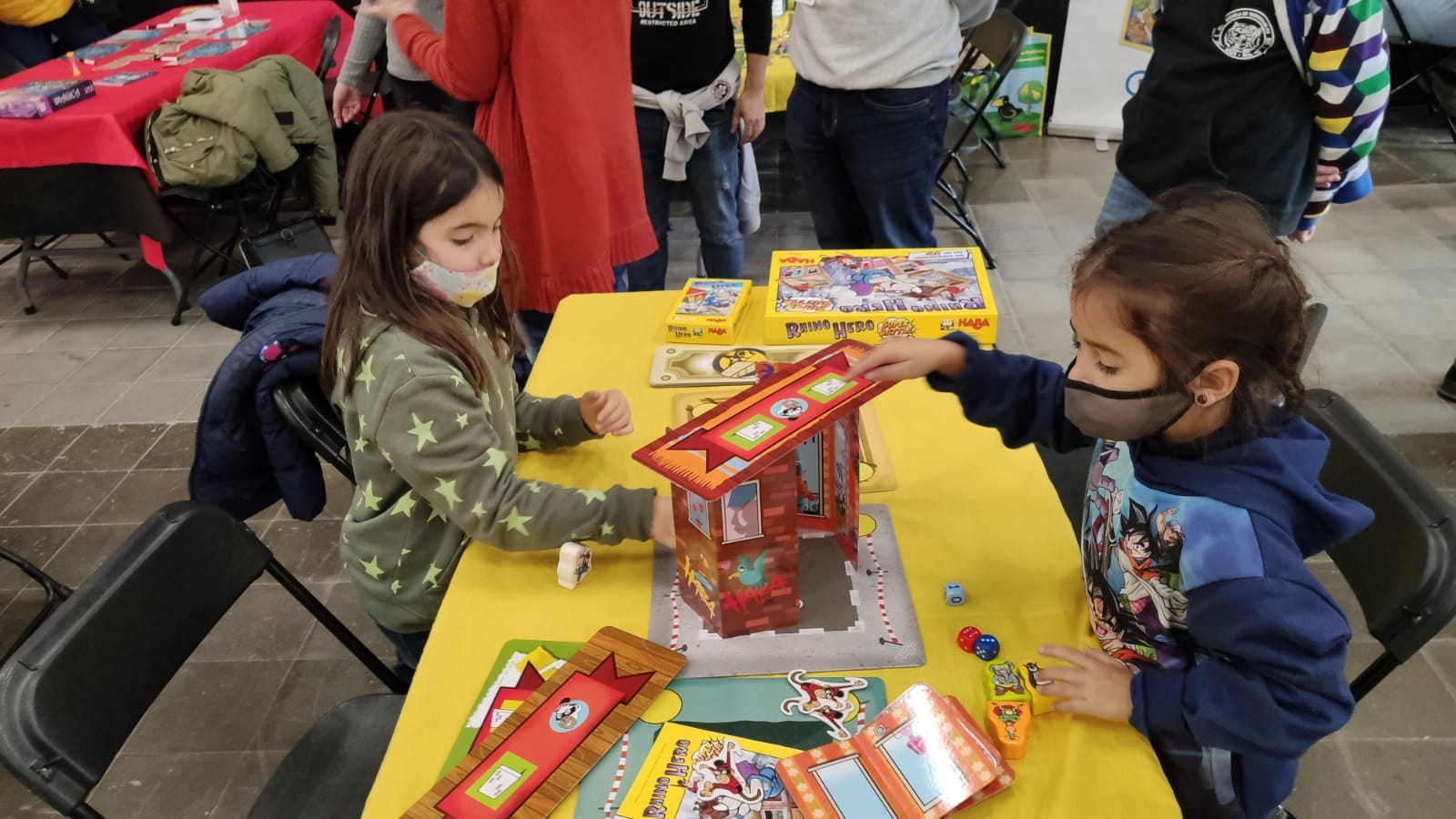
Children playing Haba's game Rhino Hero: Super Battle at Dau Barcelona festival

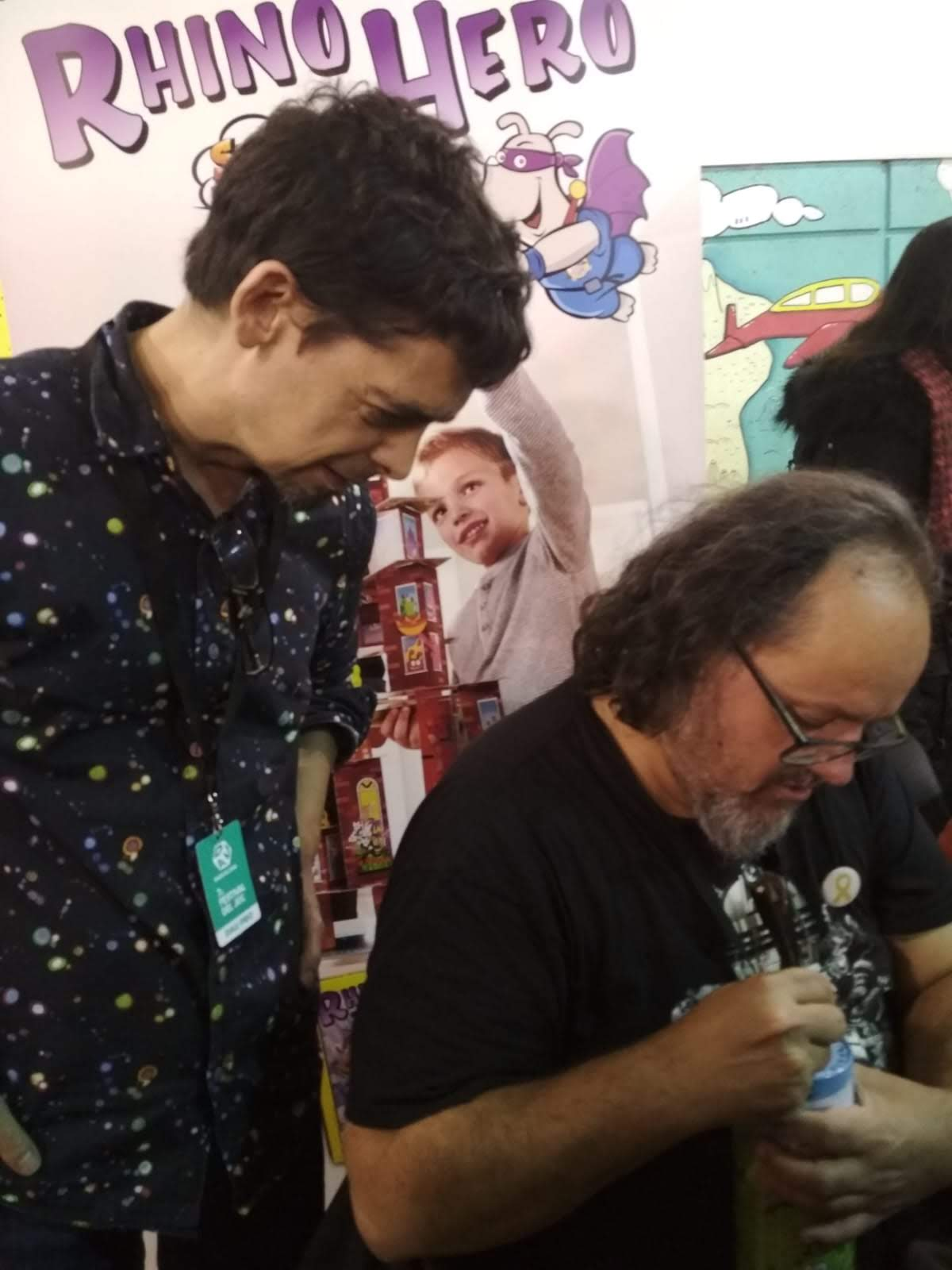
Authors signing a copy of Go Cuckoo during Dau Barcelona festival

Since its founding, Haba has used wood as a central material, especially for wooden toys. The company became known for its building blocks, which remain part of its range. Its assortment later expanded to include pull-along figures, vehicles, clutching toys, toy-shop items, ball tracks, dolls, fabric toys, children's-room accessories, craft sets, outdoor and discovery products, games, puzzles and children's books.

From the mid-1980s, Haba began to develop board games. Its best-known game, Obstgarten (Orchard), emerged from a competition in 1986. Since 2001, an in-house editorial team has developed new games in this segment. Some of the best-known games are:

- Obstgarten (Orchard), 1986, Anneliese Farkaschovsky
- Timberland, 1989, Klaus Teuber
- Cameo, 1992, Rüdiger Dorn
- Ringel Rangel, 1993, Geni Wyss – Children's Game of the Year 1993
- Karambolage, 1995, Heinz Meister – Children's Game of the Year 1995
- Leinen los!, 1997, Alex Randolph – Children's Game of the Year 1997
- Kayanak, 1999, Peter-Paul Joopen – Children's Game of the Year 1999
- Piraten-Pitt, 2000, Wolfgang Kramer – Deutscher Kinderspielepreis
- Klondike, 2001, Stefanie Rohner and Christian Wolf – Children's Game of the Year 2001
- Ruhmreiche Ritter, 2002, Roberto Fraga and Odet l'Homer
- Das Zauberschloss, 2003, Wolfgang Panning
- Socken Zocken, 2004, Michael Schacht
- Der schwarze Pirat (The Black Pirate), 2006, Guido Hoffmann – Children's Game of the Year 2006
- Diego Drachenzahn, 2010, Manfred Ludwig – Children's Game of the Year 2010
- Karuba, 2015, Rüdiger Dorn – nominated for the 2016 Spiel des Jahres
- Rhino Hero: Super Battle, 2017, Scott Frisco and Steven Strumpf
- Funkelschatz (Dragon's Breath), 2018, Lena and Günter Burkhardt – Children's Game of the Year 2018
- The Key – Sabotage at Lucky Llama Land, 2021, Thomas Sing

Haba won the critics' award Children's Game of the Year five times as of 2026 (2001, 2006, 2010, 2018 and 2019), making it the publisher with the most awards in this category. Many Haba toys also carry the "spiel gut" ("good toy") seal of approval. Kullerbü, Haba's car park play track game, was one of the winners of 2018 The Toy Award: Gold for toys awards.

=== Wehrfritz ===
Wehrfritz manufactures and distributes furniture and equipment for educational institutions. It offers, for example, tables and chairs, cloakrooms, play and climbing houses, room dividers and cupboards, and also offers interior design services. The range also includes teaching and learning materials as well as therapy aids. Outside Germany, the Wehrfritz range is distributed under the Haba name, for example as Haba Education.

=== Habermaass Stiftung ===
The group also includes the Habermaass Stiftung (Habermaass foundation), which supports projects in nature and environmental protection and in work with children and young people. In its first five years, the foundation invested around €1 million, among other things in a bird-protection association, a children's hospice and teaching materials on climate change. The foundation awards the prize Die digitale KITA der Zukunft ("The digital day-care centre of the future"), which recognises day-care centres for the child-appropriate use of digital media in early-childhood education; its jury is chaired by the early-childhood education researcher Wassilios E. Fthenakis.
