= Space game =

Space game may refer to:

- Space Game, artwork
- Space Game, a University of Central Florida Knights American football tradition
- Space flight simulation game, video game type

== See also ==
- The Space Gamer, magazine
