= Caverna =

Caverna can refer to:

- Caverna (board game)
- Horse Cave, Kentucky
