= Caverna (board game) =

Strategy board game

- Designers: Uwe Rosenberg
- Illustrators: Javier González Cava, Klemens Franz
- Publishers: Lookout Games
- Publication: 2013
- Genres: Worker Placement
- Players: 1-7
- Playing time: 30-210 minutes
- Chance: Low
- Website: lookout-spiele.de/en/games/caverna.html

Related games
- Agricola, Civilization, Dominant Species, Le Havre, Caylus

Caverna: The Cave Farmers is a 2013 board game designed by Uwe Rosenberg. It is a complex worker placement strategy game that shares similarities in gameplay and theme with his earlier board game, Agricola, The game's theme revolves around helping a small dwarf family to settle a cave and nearby woodlands and to develop the setting through furnishing caves as well as converting forests into meadows, fields and pastures. Caverna received positive reviews from critics, and two major expansions have been released for the game.

== Gameplay ==
Caverna is chiefly a worker-placement game with engine building elements for 1–7 players that play over 12 rounds. Each player begins the game as dwarfs seeking ores and rubies to develop their home spaces, which includes a forest to be converted to fields and meadows (the latter can store animals by modifying it into pastures) and two caverns that can be expanded. During each round, a new action space is added, accumulated spaces are replenished, and players take actions. This is done by placing a dwarf worker on one of the twelve action space cards, which give benefits such as twin tiles, family growth, goods and mines, animals, weapons, starting player and imitation. For instance, the "drift mining" action allows stones accumulated there to be taken. There are action spaces for twin tiles, family growth, goods and mines, animals, weapons, starting player and imitation. At the end of each round, dwarves must be fed through food gained. The game has two resources: ore is used to undertake expeditions for adventure, which provides beneficial loot items, whereas rubies is a flexible good that can be traded for landscape tiles and other goods.

At the end of the game, each farm animal, dog, vegetable, ruby and dwarf worth one gold point whereas grain is worth half of a gold point. Furnishing tiles, pastures and mines provide additional points; parlours, storage and chambers may also reward bonus points. Unused boars spaces and missing farm animals (each player is expected to have one sheep, donkey, cattle and wild boar) penalise one and two points, respectively.

The gameplay of Caverna is similar to Agricola, but redesigns elements of the original, including replacing the set of cards in the preceding game with a set of buildings with diverse abilities, the cave part of the game board, where mines can be constructed and rubies can be discovered and new weapons with strengths determined by forged ore, and two new animals.

== Expansions and reimplementations ==
The game received two major expansions, Caverna: The Forgotten Folk in 2018 and Caverna: Frantic Fiends in 2022. Originally a fan project on BoardGameGeek, Forgotten Folk was designed and refined together by Alex Wilber and Uwe Rosenberg. The expansion implements eight additional species, each with variable, distinctive abilities, and was nominated for the Gra Roku Best Expansion award for 2020.

A stand-alone two-player variant, Caverna: Cave vs. Cave, was released in 2017 as an accessible version of the original. The game received generally positive reviews, with The Opinionated Gamers describing it as a "streamlined, quick-playing version of Caverna".

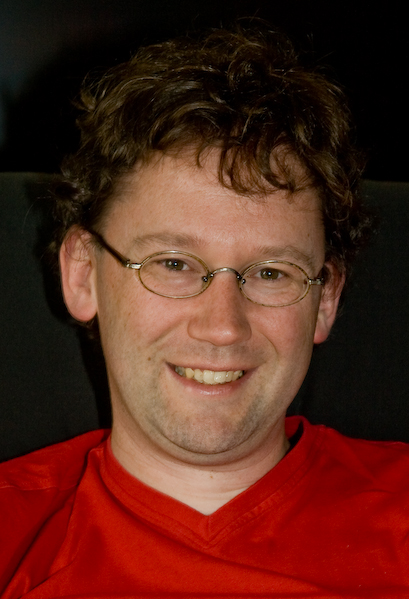
Uwe Rosenberg, the designer of Caverna.

== Reception ==
Caverna received favourable reviews, winning numerous awards including Board Game Quest Awards Best Strategy/Euro Game and Guldbrikken Best Adult Game Winner. Comparisons to Agricola are generally positive, with The Boardgame Detective stating, "In contrast to Agricola, Caverna feels like much more of a ‘sandbox’ game, with many options and many paths to victory." Similarly, Board Game King also believed Caverna to be distinctly different and more enjoyable, calling it "a better-balanced game" than Agricola. Hexagamers praised both games, but noted that Caverna "is a lot looser and free in what you can do". Caverna's worker placement mechanism and its complexity have also been met positively, with The Cardboard Quest describing it as "the quintessential modern Euro" and praised its diversity of actions; however, it was also criticised for a lack of tension. The game also ranks as one of the top games on Board Game Geek.

In a review of Caverna: The Cave Farmers in Black Gate, John ONeill said "the game is simple at heart, but with a delicious opportunity for play complexity — and a very different take on traditional fantasy."
