= Fundex Games =

American Toy Company

Fundex Games, Ltd. was an American toy and game company based in Plainfield, Indiana. Founded in 1986, Fundex Games produced many different games including card games, dice games, domino-based games, magic tricks, board games, and children's toys. Fundex also produced a line of outdoor lawn and tailgate games. Fundex Games was founded by Peter Voigt and his son, Chip Voigt.

Fundex Games had an exclusive partnership with the Professional Domino Association to market PDA-licensed domino games and other products for the United States market. Fundex's best selling game was Phase 10, which was the second best selling cardgame in the world, behind Uno. The rights to Phase 10 were sold to Uno-maker, Mattel, in 2010.

In 2012, Fundex Games filed for bankruptcy in the Southern District of Indiana. The assets of the company were acquired in a bankruptcy auction by Poof-Slinky, Inc.

== Awards ==
Fundex Games was awarded numerous iParenting Media Awards for its products: five awards for Hottest Products for 2004 and one award for Best Products of 2006. Additionally, Fundex Games earned an Oppenheim Toy Portfolio Platinum Award in 2006 for Alfredo's Food Fight, a board game for young children and Highrise a family Domino Game.

== Products ==
=== Card games ===
- Heist
- Hit the Deck
- Phase 10
- Rage
- Shoot the Moon
- Monte Carlo Playing Cards
- Arne

=== Children's games ===
- Children's games

- Peanut Butter & Jelly
- Don't Cut the Cheese
- Don't Tip the Waiter
- My MASH Game
- What's In Ned's Head?
- Monster Under My Bed
- A to Z Jr.
- Alfredo's Food Fight
- Goosebumps Welcome to Horrorland

- Thumb Decks

- Thumb Decks Collectible Cards Assortment

- Lunch Box games

- Cookin' Cookies
- Peanut Butter & Jelly
- Wormy Apples Game
- The Storybook Game
- Jelly Bean Jumble Game
- Pinkalicious Pinkerella Game

=== Dice games ===
- Phase 10 Dice
- Swipe
- Sting
- Shake
- Bowling Dice

=== Board games ===
- Alfredo's Food Fight
- What's in Ned's Head?
- Monster Under my Bed
- Gassy Gus
- Gnip Gnop
- Mancala
- Paddle Pool
- Booby Trap
- Sputnik
- Top Spot
- Chairs
- Hot Potato
- A to Z
- Phase 10 Twist

=== Domino games ===
- Highrise
- Mexican Train
- Wildfire
- High Five

=== Outdoor games ===
- Recreaction Branded Games
- Chuck-O Pro
- Top Toss (ladder toss game)
- Bulls-Eye Washers
- Bagball
- Score Station
