= A Feast for Odin =

2016 Euro-style board game

- Designers: Uwe Rosenberg
- Illustrators: Dennis Lohausen
- Publishers: Feuerland Spiele; Cranio Creations; Devir; Filosofia Éditions; Game Harbor; Hobby World; Korea Boardgames co., Ltd.; Lacerta; Mandala Jogos; テンデイズゲームズ (Ten Days Games); White Goblin Games; Z-Man Games, Inc.
- Publication: 2016
- Players: 1–4
- Chance: Low (Cards, Dice)
- Skills: Economic management, Resource management, Strategic thought

A Feast for Odin is a game created by Uwe Rosenberg. It is a Euro-style game whose mechanics include worker placement and tile laying. The tiles are polyominoes of up to 12 squares representing Viking commodities and treasures such as cabbage, mead, whalebone, runes and ornaments.

The full game is 7 rounds long, with an option for a shorter 6-round game. The rounds increase in length as the number of vikings each player may use goes up by 1 each round. The game includes a 20-page historical almanac written by Gernot Köpke.

A Feast for Odin was published in 2016 by Feuerland Spiele (Germany), in North American licence by Z-Man Games. It can be played by 1 to 4 players.

== Gameplay ==
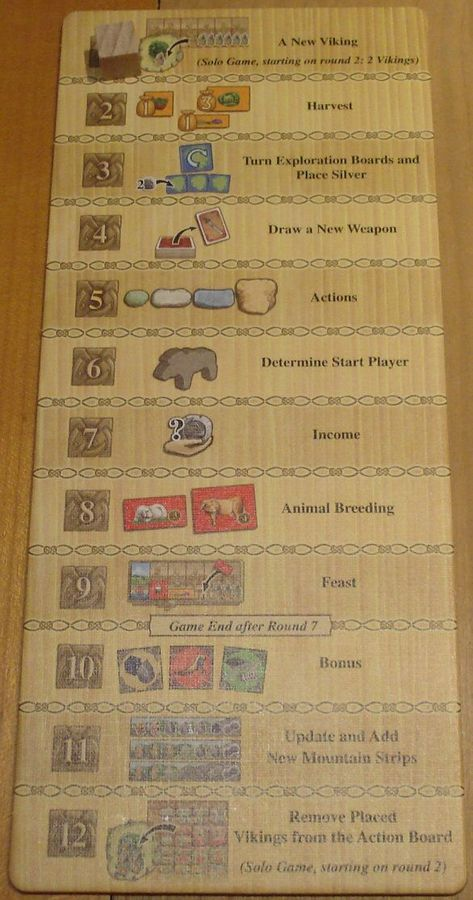
The 12 phases in each round of A Feast for Odin

Players start the game with their main board in front of them. They then go through the 12 phases illustrated on the round overview shown, and repeat until the game is over. During a player's turn, they take turns clockwise, adding their workers to unoccupied spaces on the action board. Players retrieve Vikings each round during the Retrieve Vikings phase.

== Expansions ==
The game has received two mini expansions and one major expansion, A Feast for Odin: The Norwegians (2018).

== Reception ==
An Ars Technica review states that the game is a "cohesive, deep, and fun experience". Reviewing for Tabletop Gaming, Matt Jarvis praises the theme, strategy, mechanics, and tension, concluding that it was a "rich, hugely rewarding experience".
