= Karuba (board game) =

2015 board game

- Designers: Rudiger Dorn
- Illustrators: Claus Stephan
- Publishers: HABA
- Publication: 2015
- Players: 2–4
- Playing time: 40 minutes

Karuba is a tile-laying race game for 2–4 players, designed by Rudiger Dorn and published by HABA in 2015. Each player has 4 explorers, which move through the jungle on the player's private board in order to discover treasure and reach hidden temples. The game was nominated for the 2016 Spiel Des Jahres award.

== Gameplay ==
In Karuba, a player randomly picks a numbered tile each turn. Tiles contain roads which touch two, three, or four edges of the tile, forming curves, straightaways, T-intersections, etc.

Then all the players play the identical numbered tile on their own separate jungle boards. After a few turns, each player board looks unique with tiles configured in different places. Explorers can move along the roads created by the tiles when a player discards a tile instead of placing it on their board.

Some tiles contain gold or gems when placed, and when an explorer stops on these tiles the player collects the treasure. The players race to have their explorers reach the temples before the other players, which are worth more points the fewer other players have reached the corresponding temple on their own board. The game ends when one player reaches all four temples or all 36 tiles have been used.

== Reception ==
An Ars Technica review praised its accessibility and lack of downtime, and described it as a "nice spatial puzzle". Nate Anderson and Aaron Zimmerman also commented positively on its lack of downtime, complexity, and accessibility, but was more critical of its theme and lack of player interaction. Karuba: The Card Game was also complimented by Owen Duffy from The Guardian for its engagement, player interaction, and accessibility.

== Spinoff ==
In 2018 HABA released Karuba: The Card Game, a shorter, simpler version of Karuba which supports up to six players.
