= Swipe (dice game) =

2004 dice game

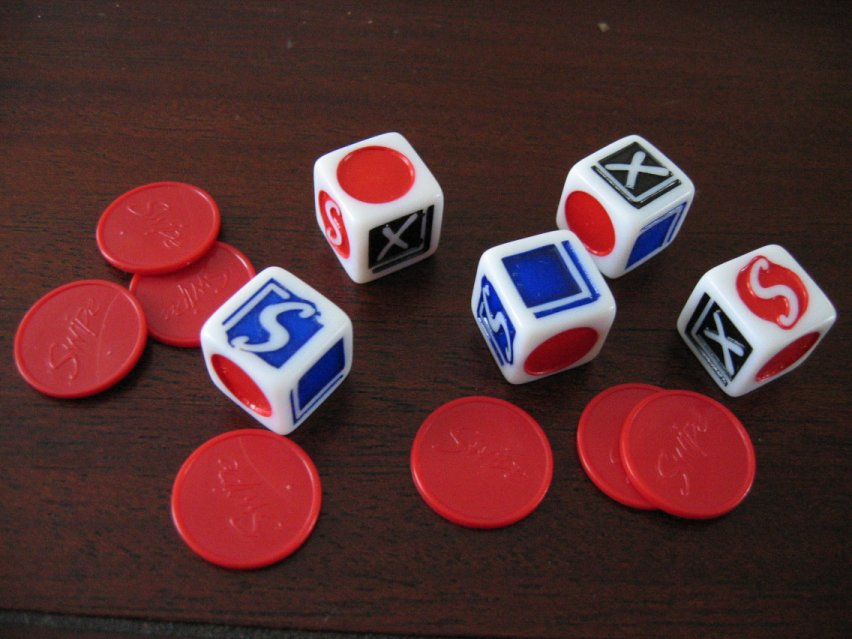
- Swipe dice and chips
- Designers: Garrett J. Donner Michael S. Steer Wendy L. Harris
- Publishers: Fundex Games
- Players: Two to six
- Setup time: None
- Playing time: Dependent on number of players
- Chance: High
- Age range: Eight and up
- Skills: Dice rolling

Swipe is a proprietary dice game for two to six players made by Fundex Games in 2004. The object of the game is to win chips through the rolling of special dice that can be used to win chips or dice from the center (kitty) or from other players.

== Overview of the rules ==
Each player is given two "Swipe" dice and two chips at the start of the game (in the case of five or six players, each player receives only one die to start). The remaining chips and dice are placed into the center for later use (if there are only two players, all but three dice are placed into the center).

The youngest player starts by rolling all of his or her dice. Each die has five different values:

- Two instances of win a chip from the center, signified by a red dot
- One instance of win a die from the center, signified by a blue die
- One instance of lose a die to the center, signified by a black die with an X
- One instance of swipe a die from any player, signified by a blue die with an S
- One instance of swipe a chip from any player, signified by a red dot with an S.

After rolling, the player does whatever the dice say and the turn passes to the next player to the left. A player cannot lose all of their dice; one is the fewest dice a player can have. The game is over once all chips are won from the center.

=== Super Swipe ===
If a player rolls and all dice are lose a die to the center (black dice with an X), it is a "Super Swipe". The player then swipes one die from each player and takes another turn. A player with only one die is eligible for a Super Swipe if their single rolled die is lose a die to the center.

=== Winning the game ===
The winner is the player with the most chips at the end of the game. If two or more players have the same number of chips, the winner is the player with the most dice. If two or more players are tied in both chips and dice, there is a "roll-off." Each player gets one die and rolls; the first player to roll lose a die to the center loses.
