= Lookout Games =

German board game publisher

- Company type: Subsidiary
- Founded: 2000; 26 years ago
- Headquarters: Schwabenheim an der Selz, Germany
- Key people: Hanno Girke, Uwe Rosenberg, Klemens Franz
- Products: Board games
- Parent: Asmodee (2018–present)
- Website: lookout-games.de

Lookout Games is a German board and card game publisher owned by Asmodee. The company published, among other games, the board game Agricola, which was honored with the Complex Game award by the German Game of the Year jury in 2008.

== History ==
The company was founded in 2000 by Hanno Girke, Uwe Rosenberg and Marcel-André Casasola Merkle. By this time, especially Rosenberg was already well known for his card game Bohnanza, which was published by a major German game company. The first game of Lookout Games was a small card game called Attribut. The game was originally published online at the gaming website Brettspielwelt. Later, the company started to produce physical copies of the game. In 2003 Attribut was on the shortlist for the German Game of the Year award. In 2007 the board game Agricola was published. In 2008 Agricola got the special award Complex Game at the German Game of the Year awards and the first place at the German Game Prize. Agricola became one of the highest rated games at the board game website Boardgamegeek. 2008 the successor Le Havre was published. In 2009 Le Havre got the second place at the German Game Prize. In 2005 the company started to publish games from Z-Man Games in Germany. In February 2018, Asmodee acquired the company.

== Published games ==
=== Own games ===
- 2002: Attribut, Game of the Year Awards shortlist
- 2004:
  - Attribut 2
  - Schätzbold
  - The Scepter of Zavandor
- 2005: Spelunke
- 2006:
  - Die Drachenbändiger von Zavandor
- 2007: Agricola, Special Award: Complex Game 2008, German Game Prize 2008
- 2008: Le Havre, German Game Prize - Second Place 2009
- 2009: Automobile
- 2010:
  - Merkator
  - The Mines of Zavandor
- various Bohnanza expansions
- various Agricola expansions
- 2013 Caverna
- 2014 Murano
- 2015 Isle of Skye: From Chieftain to King
- 2020 Hallertau

=== Games by other companies ===
Games by Z-Man Games, which Lookout Games published in Germany:

- 2005: The End of the Triumvirate
- 2009: Magister Navis (Endeavor)

Games by Hartland Trefoil Ltd, which Lookout Games published in Germany:

- 2009: 1853
