= Uwe Rosenberg =

German game designer

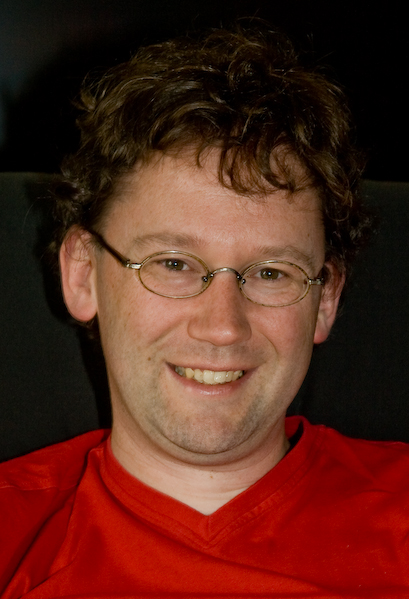
Rosenberg in 2009

Uwe Rosenberg (born 27 March 1970) is a German game designer and the co-founder of Lookout Games. He initially became known for his card game Bohnanza, which was successful both in Germany and internationally. He is now renowned for developing many highly-acclaimed strategy games, such as Agricola, Caverna and A Feast for Odin. As of May 2025, six of his games are on BoardGameGeek's top 100 board games of all time, the most of any designer.

== Works ==
Born in Aurich, Germany, Rosenberg first began to occupy himself with the development and mechanisms of games at the age of 12. He published a number of play-by-mail games during his school years. While he was still in college, Amigo published his first major success, Bohnanza. Since finishing his statistics studies in Dortmund (the subject of his thesis was "Probability distributions in Memory"), his main occupation is the development of games.

In 2000, he and a few other game designers founded the publishing company Lookout Games. It published a number of expansions to Bohnanza, partly in cooperation with Hanno Girke. Larger projects were at first published at other publishers, such as Amigo and Kosmos.

Since 2005, Rosenberg has concentrated mostly on complex economic strategy worker placement games, often with an agricultural or fishing theme. His first such game, Agricola, was released in October 2007 and won a Spiel des Jahres special award for best complex game of the year. It dethroned Puerto Rico as the highest ranked game on BoardGameGeek in September 2008 and remained there until March 2010. It has since become a so-called modern classic in the European game scene and retains a respectable following of devoted competitive players. A second game in this series, Le Havre, was published in October 2008, as well as Caverna in 2013. Other notable worker placement games he has since designed include Fields of Arle (2014), A Feast for Odin (2016), Nusfjord (2017), Hallertau (2020), Atiwa (2022), and Black Forest (with co-designer Tido Lorenz; 2024), all of which have a BoardGameGeek user rating of at least 7.5/10. As of May 2025, A Feast for Odin is his highest ranked game on BoardGameGeek at #25 and with an 8.2/10 average rating. As of 1 May 2025 he is credited as designer or co-designer of 269 board game entries (including expansions and reimplementations).

In 2014, he also began designing several less-complex tile placement games, including the popular Patchwork (2014), Spring Meadow (2018), and New York Zoo (2020).

Many of Rosenberg's designs have also been recognized as being excellent for solitary play.

== Notable games ==
- Bohnanza (1997)
- Mamma Mia! (1999)
- Agricola (2007)
- Le Havre (2008)
- Ora et Labora (2011)
- Caverna (2013)
- Patchwork (2014)
- Fields of Arle (2014)
- A Feast for Odin (2016)
- Nusfjord (2016)
- Hallertau (2020)
- Black Forest (2024)
