= Colonial Diplomacy =

Strategic board game similar to Diplomacy

Colonial Diplomacy is a board game very similar to the original, Diplomacy. Gameplay is nearly identical to the original. Seven players fight to control the board through diplomacy. Movement is turn-based, but all players' orders are executed simultaneously, unlike Risk.

== Setting ==
The game is set in Asia in the late 19th Century. Much of the board is controlled by European colonial powers. The powers include: Great Britain, Russia, Japan, Holland, Turkey, China, and France.

== Differences ==
Colonial Diplomacy includes a couple of notable additions, which differentiate the Colonial Diplomacy from the original Diplomacy.

- Trans-Siberian Railroad – A railroad that extends across Russia from Moscow to Vladivostok. The railroad can be used by Russia to move armies anywhere along the railroad. The Trans-Siberian Railroad may only be used by Russia. Russian armies are allowed to move through other Russian armies, but foreign armies can block the passage of armies on the Trans-Siberian Railroad.
- Suez Canal – The Suez Canal is the only way to move between the Red Sea and Mediterranean Sea. Use of the Suez Canal is controlled by whoever is in control of Egypt. The use of the Suez Canal increases in importance later in the game as expansion becomes both more important and more difficult.

== Reception ==
Benjamin Monk, Jr. reviewed Colonial Diplomacy in White Wolf Inphobia #54 (April, 1995), rating it a 5 out of 5 and stated that "For wargamers, boardgamers and Diplomacy enthusiasts, it's worth every dime. You get a colorful map, wooden pieces, conference maps and an extended rulenook. On the down side, it's difficult to justify the price to players of other kinds of games."

Colonial Diplomacy won the Origins Awards for Best Pre-20th Century Board Game of 1995 in a tie with The Three Days Of Gettysburg by GMT Games.

Colonial Diplomacy won the Games 100 for Abstract strategy in 1995.
