= Las Vegas (board game) =

2012 board game

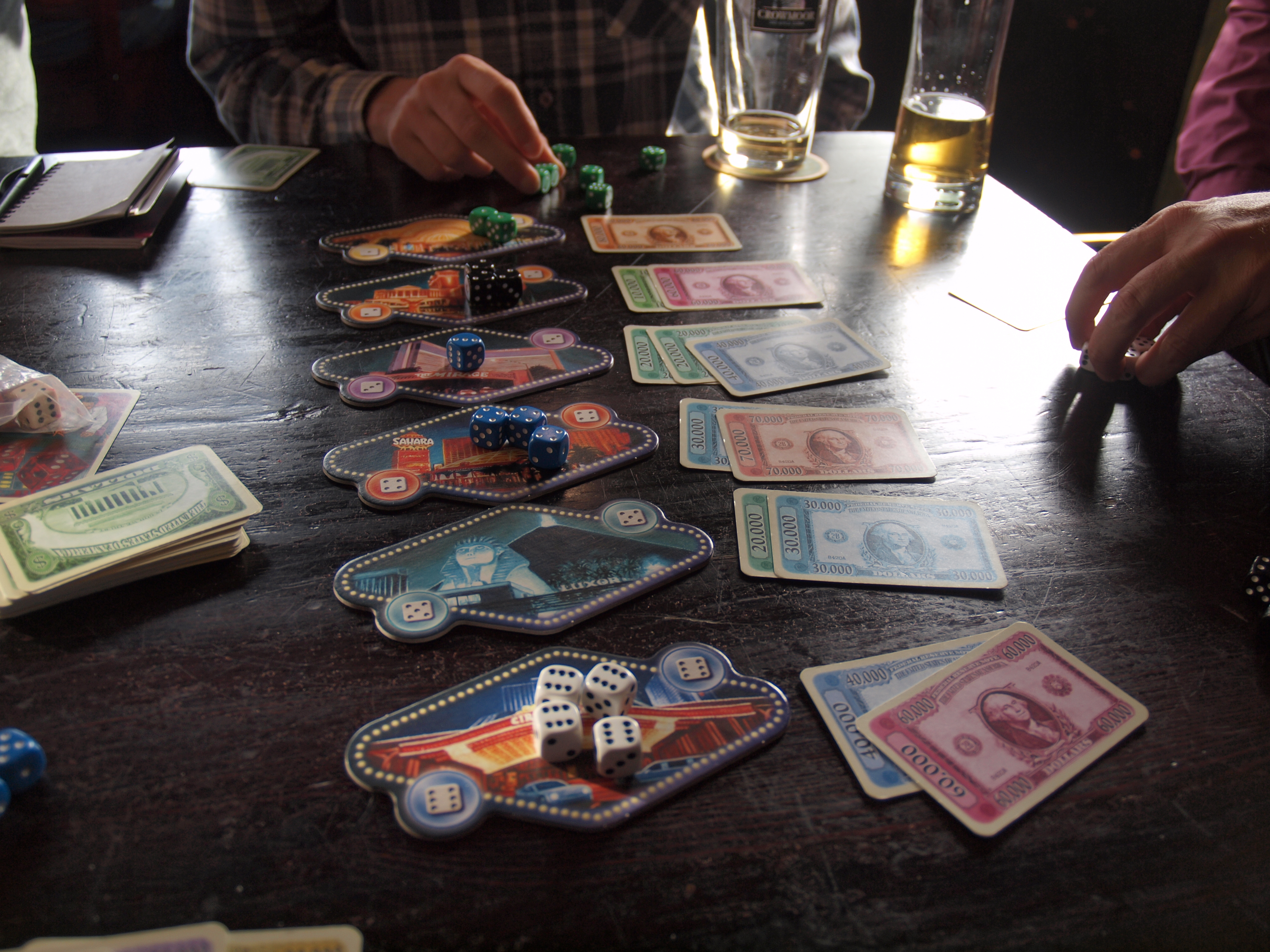
- Las Vegas being played in a pub in Kerava, Finland.
- Designers: Rüdiger Dorn
- Illustrators: Harald Lieske; Markus Schmuck; Mia Steingräber
- Publishers: Ravensburger
- Players: 2–5
- Setup time: <1 minute
- Playing time: 15-30 minutes
- Skills: Probability theory

Las Vegas (US Release Title: Vegas Dice Game) is a board game designed by Rüdiger Dorn and published by Ravensburger in 2012. (The US Release came out in 2017.) It is named after the city of Las Vegas in Nevada, United States and has a gambling theme. The game was also nominated for the Spiel des Jahres prize in 2012.

== Rules ==
Las Vegas is a game for two to five players. It consists of six small boards representing different casinos (originally depicting real Vegas casinos; later the same casinos with faux renamings; in the US release, simply numbered boards with similar decorative backgrounds), a deck of 54 "bills" (cards) in various denominations of the United States dollar (from $10,000 to $90,000 in $10,000 increments), an additional "First Player" card (denoting who starts each round of play) and five sets of eight dice, each set colored differently (orange, green, blue, black and white). The US release also included a dice pouch for storing the game dice.

The game is played for four rounds. At the start of each round, each casino is randomly dealt a bill from the deck. Each casino must hold at least $50,000. If the bill's worth is less than that, the casino is dealt additional bills, until the casino holds at least $50,000.

Players take turns throwing their dice. At the start of a round, each player is holding all of their eight dice. After the dice are thrown, the player must choose which casino they are betting on. This is done by choosing a number and placing all the dice showing that number on the respective casino. Betting is mandatory; there is no option to voluntarily pass a turn. A player can only pass a turn when he/she has no dice left for the round.

Once all players have bet all their dice, the winnings are dealt out. For each casino, the winnings go to the player who bet the most dice on that casino. The majority has to be strict - on a draw, the winnings go to the player with the next most dice, or if all players are equal, the winnings go back to the deck. In case a casino holds multiple bills, the top player receives the largest bill, and the smaller ones in order of decreasing value are awarded to the runner-up players, with unawarded bills being returned to the deck.

After each round is scored, the players get their dice back, the casinos are dealt a new set of money and the "First Player" card is given to the next player in play order. After four rounds, the player who has won the most money wins the game.

The rules also include a variant using the white dice as a "phantom" player who can prevent the other "real" players from scoring. The white dice are evenly (as possible) distributed between the players, who roll and place them alongside their own dice.

== Expansion ==
An expansion set, titled Las Vegas Boulevard, was released in 2014. The expansion (which went under the pre-release titles of Las Vegas Lights and Las Vegas Plus) included additional dice in yellow, grey and purple (allowing for up to 8 players in regular play) plus additional white dice for expanded play, "large" over-sized dice that count as 2 dice, a seventh "slot machine" casino board, additional $100,000 "bills", and various other cards to be used for variant play included with the expanded rules (such as "rainbow" cards, action cards, bonus cards, etc.). Such variants included rules for a solitaire version of the game, as well as the variants using the additional cards and dice.

== Reception ==
Reviewing for Lautapeliopas, Mikko Saari complimented its accessibility, combination of luck and strategy, and the engagement. However, he was critical of the scalability at lower player counts. The game was also nominated for the 2012 Spiel des Jahres. The jury praised the game, stating that "[with] each roll of the dice, the players oscillate between winning the main prize and failing - that's captivating! Accordingly, the emotions fluctuate between elation, anger and malicious joy. And especially when the electrified gamblers force their luck with a little tactics and risk". Christoph Ledinger from Spieletest praised its accessibility and combination of luck and strategy, but was mixed on its engagement and considered it to be "monotonous".
