= Gnip Gnop =

Board game

- Publishers: Parker Brothers 1971–, Fundex Games 2005–
- Players: 2
- Playing time: 10 minutes
- Age range: 5 and up

Gnip Gnop (pronounced with hard G's) is a two-player plastic table-top game, consisting of a sides- and top-transparent rectangular enclosure containing six plastic balls. The enclosure is bisected into two chambers or zones by a similarly transparent barrier having three holes slightly larger than the balls. At each end of the unit a player uses any of a row of three hinged paddles to shoot the balls up a slightly inclined plane through the holes into the opposing player's zone. The game begins with three balls on each side. The object is to win the game by rapidly shooting the balls until the moment all six balls end up in the other player's zone simultaneously.

Gnip Gnop was designed and named by Joseph M. Burck of Marvin Glass and Associates for Parker Brothers. It was originally released in 1971. Fundex Games later produced a slightly modified version of the game.

The name is the backward spelling of "Ping-Pong", the common name for table tennis.
