= Rage (trick-taking card game) =

- A commercial trick-taking game for 2-6 players
- Origin: United States
- Type: trick-taking
- Players: 2-6
- Skills: Tactics
- Age range: 7+
- Cards: 110
- Deck: proprietary 6-suit 16-value
- Rank (high→low): 15 - 0, trump decided at random
- Play: Clockwise
- Playing time: ~8 minutes per hand or 41 - 64 Minutes with 2 Players
- Chance: Moderate

Related games
- Oh hell

Rage is a 1983 trick-taking card game marketed by Fundex Games that is based on the game oh hell. Players bid to take a particular number of tricks, and are awarded bonus points for doing so. The commercial game differs significantly from the traditional version in the use of a proprietary deck with 6 colored suits and the addition of 6 types of special cards that change gameplay.

== Deck ==
Rage uses a deck made up as follows.

- 96 number cards, divided among 6 colored suits (red, orange, yellow, green, blue, and purple) each with 16 values (0-15).
- 2 Wild Rage cards
- 2 Bonus Rage cards
- 2 Mad Rage cards
- 4 Change Rage cards
- 4 Out Rage cards

There are thus a total of 110 cards in the deck. Fundex states there are 16 Rage cards (though its itemized list adds up to only the 14 listed here) and so some editions of the game may have additional Rage cards.

== Setup ==
The game can be played by 2 to 6 players. One player is the scorekeeper and uses either the special scoresheet printed in the instructions (it can be photocopied freely) or a piece of plain paper to keep score. The entire deck of cards is shuffled and cut.

== Deal ==
In the first round, 10 cards are dealt to each player. In each subsequent round one fewer card is dealt, until by the tenth and final round, each player receives only one card. Cards are dealt clockwise. The pile is put down in the middle of the table, and its top card is turned over. The color of this card is the trump suit; a card of this color played to a trick will beat any other card played except a higher trump. If this top card is a Rage card, it is discarded and another card is turned over, until a color card is shown.

== Bidding ==
After viewing and organizing their hands, starting to the dealer's left, players bid in turn on the number of tricks they think they can take in the hand. Bidding is non-auction; a player's first and only bid is binding. Bids are recorded by the scorekeeper. Four players can play in partnerships, while 6 players can play in pairs or teams of 3. In such cases, bids are summed to form a team bid.

After bidding is finished, the player on the dealer's left selects and plays a single card from their hand. Each player in turn then does the same, with the caveat that they must "follow suit" by playing a card of the same color if they have one. If the lead card was a Rage card other than Wild Rage (such cards have no intrinsic color), the color of the second card played determines the lead color that others must follow. If a player does not have any card of that color, they may play any card from their hand, including a trump card (if trump was not led) or a Rage card. The player playing the highest trump card, or if trump was not played the highest card of the led suit, takes the trick and leads the subsequent trick.

=== Rage cards ===
The 14 Rage cards in the deck have black borders and, with the exception of the Wild Rage card, do not count as being of any suit and therefore cannot win a trick. Their effects are as follows:

- Change Rage - When played, the current trump color is replaced by a new one, by selecting the trump color of the players choice. That color becomes trump effective immediately for this and future tricks until another Change Rage or an Out Rage card is played, or the round ends.
- Out Rage - When played, the current trump color is discarded, but not replaced. The face-up card of the trump pile is turned face-down and discarded, and the current and any future tricks in the round are played without a trump suit. A Change Rage card played later in the current trick or in any subsequent trick cancels this effect by choosing a new trump color.
- Bonus Rage - When played, the person who takes the current trick adds an extra 5 points to their score.
- Mad Rage - When played, the person who takes this trick subtracts 5 points from their score.
- Wild Rage - This card is unique in that it is the only Rage card that can win a trick. When played, the player announces a specific color. This color can be the trump color. The Wild Rage card then becomes equivalent to a 16 of that color, beating any other card of that color. If both Wild Rage cards are played in a single trick, the card played first outranks the second.

== Scoring ==
After a round is complete (all players' hands have been exhausted of cards), players count the number of tricks they have taken, and score as follows:

- +1 point for each trick
- +10 for taking exactly the number of tricks bid
  - only +5 are awarded if the player bid and took zero tricks.

To this, the Bonus Rage and Mad Rage points are added or subtracted (+5 for Bonus Rage, -5 for Mad Rage). Bonuses and penalties stack, so if a player takes two Bonus Rage cards they earn 10 extra points; if a player takes a Bonus Rage and a Mad Rage card, the bonus and penalty net to zero.

An alternative scoring system is as follows:

- +1 point for each trick
- +10 for taking exactly the number of tricks bid (including a zero bid)
- -5 for missing your bid (either higher or lower)

This alternate form of scoring makes the game more volatile and competitive. Players that accidentally win more bids than they predicted, want to continue to win tricks to minimize their losses. Bonus Rage and Mad Rage points are added and subtracted the same as above.

== Winning ==
The player who has the highest score after the tenth round (in which a single card is dealt) is the winner.

== Variations ==
The game lends itself to many variations. Among the variants listed in the instructions packaged with the game are:

- A player may play a Rage card even if they could follow suit.
- Bids are made in secret, written on a piece of paper kept by the player and only revealed after the round is over.
- Except in the last round where only one trick is taken, a player who takes every trick in the round (whether they bid to do so or not) earns 2 points per trick instead of only 1.

Additionally, unofficial variants can easily be added. The number of rounds and number of cards dealt in each round can be varied widely, such as starting with a single card and increasing to 10, dealing 10 rounds of 10 cards each (no reduction in hand size in subsequent rounds), etc. The Rage cards' effects can also be altered; players may be able to choose a specific trump color when playing a Change Rage card, for instance.
