= Bohnanza =

German-style card game based on the game mechanics of trading and politics

- Box art for the game Bohnanza.
- Designers: Uwe Rosenberg
- Illustrators: Uwe Rosenberg, Klemens Franz, Atelier Löwentor, Björn Pertoft
- Publishers: Amigo Spiele / Rio Grande Games
- Players: 2-7
- Setup time: approx. 5 min.
- Playing time: 30-60 minutes

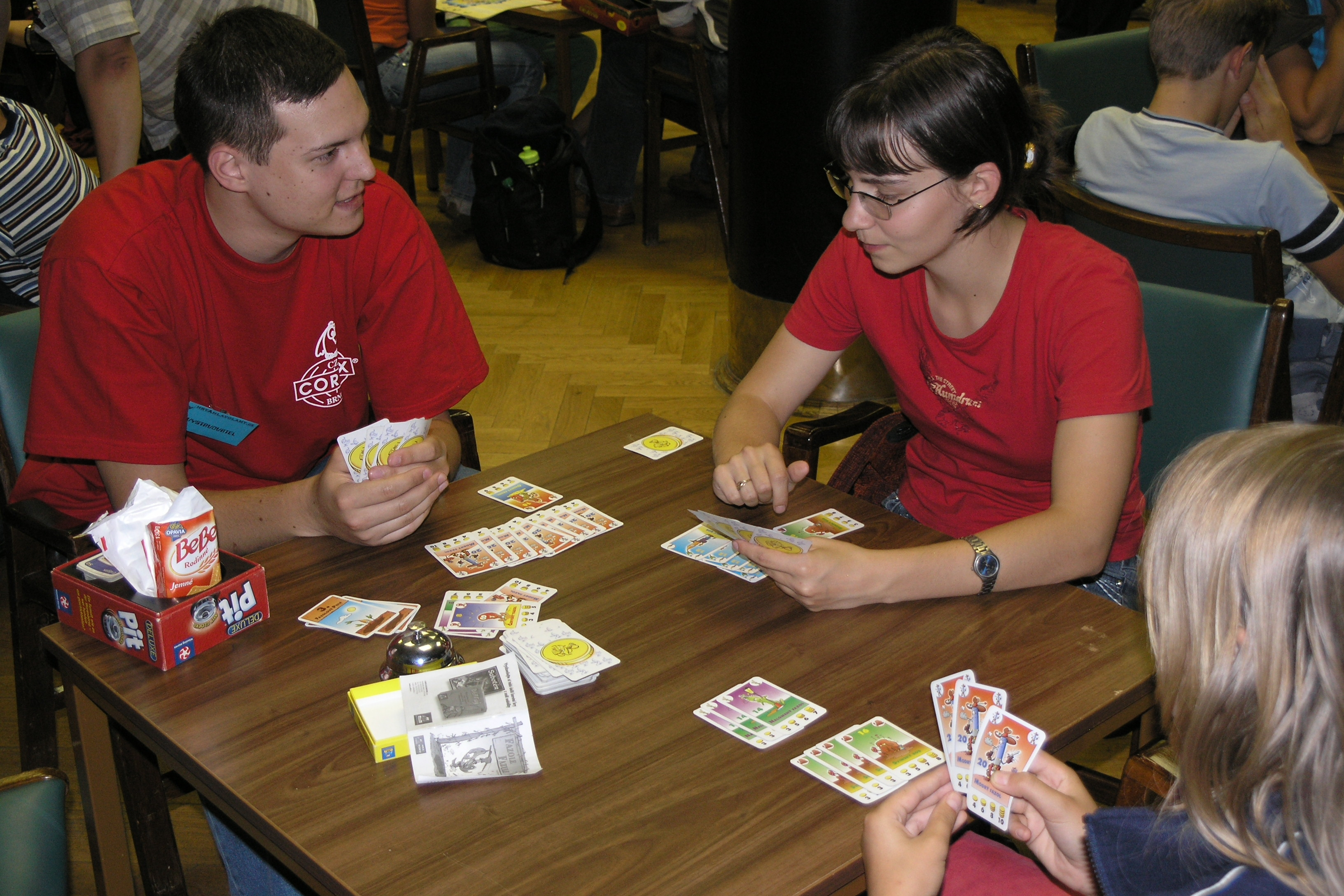
A Bohnanza game-playing tournament in the Czech Republic

Bohnanza is a German-style card game based on the game mechanics of trading and politics, designed by Uwe Rosenberg and released in 1997 (in German) by Amigo Spiele and (in English) by Rio Grande Games. It is played with a deck of cards with comical illustrations of eleven different types of beans of varying scarcity, which the players are trying to plant and sell in order to earn money. The principal restriction is that players may only farm two or three types of beans at once (limited by the number of fields they own), but they obtain beans of all different types randomly from the deck and so must engage in trade with the other players to be successful.

The original game is for 3–5 players and takes about 1 hour to play, but the Rio Grande edition adds alternative rules to the official rulebook to allow for games for 2–7 players. The name Bohnanza is a pun on the words Bohne (German for "bean") and bonanza (an English word for "an exceptionally large and rich mineral deposit" as well as a reference to the long-running Western show Bonanza).

== Rules ==
=== Cards ===
Name		Total in Deck	Number Needed to Harvest			
English	German	Total in Deck	1	2	3	4
Coffee Bean	Kaffeebohne^{1}	24	4	7	10	12
Wax Bean^{2}	Weinbrandbohne^{1}	22	4	7	9	11
Blue Bean	Blaue Bohne^{3}	20	4	6	8	10
Chili Bean	Feuerbohne	18	3	6	8	9
Stink Bean	Saubohne	16	3	5	7	8
Green Bean	Brechbohne^{4}	14	3	5	6	7
Soy Bean	Sojabohne	12	2	4	6	7
Black-eyed Bean	Augenbohne	10	2	4	5	6
Red Bean	Rote Bohne	8	2	3	4	5
Garden Bean	Gartenbohne	6	-	2	3	-
Cocoa Bean	Kakaobohne^{1}	4	2	-	3	4
Field Bean	Ackerbohnen^{5}	3	-	2^{6}	3	-

^1 The Coffee, Wax and Cocoa Beans were added in an expansion in the German edition. In the English edition of the game, they are included in the standard set. They are also included in the 25th anniversary edition.

^2 The English edition of the game changed the Weinbrandbohne (Brandy Bean) into the Wax Bean.

^3 In German, blaue Bohnen is slang for bullets, explaining the illustration of the blue bean dressed as a cowboy.

^4 In German, green beans are called Brechbohnen, from the verb brechen, meaning "to break" (as in "breaking" the beans from the bush in order to harvest them); but brechen in German can also mean "to vomit", explaining the illustration of the vomiting green bean.

^5 Only included in the 25th anniversary Edition; Field Bean originally included in an expansion.

^6 Only playable in a 4-5 player game. When Harvested, it grants the player an extra field by turning over the playmat to show three fields.

=== Setup ===
Each player is dealt a hand of cards to start (typically five cards, though hand size varies with expansion sets and number of players). A rule unique to Bohnanza is that cards in hand must be kept in the order in which they are dealt at all times; they may not be rearranged.

Each player has two fields (or three in a three-player game) in which to plant beans. In older editions of the game, a third field could be bought by any player at any point during the game for three coins, though in more recent editions this ability has been removed. Each field may contain any number of bean cards, but all beans in a field must be of the same bean type. If a bean of a type different from those already growing in a field is planted into that field, the beans previously in it must be "harvested" for coins. A field containing just one bean may not be harvested by a player unless all of their fields have 1 or fewer beans in them. Each player also has a trading area to hold cards gained through trades and a treasury to hold the player's earned coins.

Cards in the hand are kept hidden. Cards in trading areas and fields are visible to all players. The number of cards in each player's treasury is kept secret from the other players. The discard pile is face up, but only the top card is visible; players may not examine the pile. When the deck runs out, the discard pile is reshuffled and re-used as the deck.

=== Turn sequence ===
During their turn, each player does the following:

1. They must play the first card in their hand (the one at the front; i.e., the one dealt to them earliest) into a field. This may result in them having to harvest beans!
2. They may play the next card in their hand into a field.
3. They must take the top two cards from the deck and place them face up into their trading area.
4. Trading opens. Players may make offers and trade cards from (and only from) their hands (but they may offer/trade any card(s) in their hands in any order) and the cards in the active player's trading area. Traded cards go into the recipient's trading area. Trade may only occur with the player whose turn it is. No cards may ever be traded from fields. No cards can ever get placed into a player's hand by trading. No cards that have been traded once may be traded again - once a bean has been traded it must be planted in a field of the person it has been traded with.
5. Trading ends whenever the player whose turn it is decides it should. At the end of trading, each player must plant all cards in their trading area into their fields. This may involve harvesting beans, possibly several times; take note of the order in which beans are planted into fields if there are more types of beans being planted than fields they are being planted into.
6. The player ends their turn by drawing cards from the deck, one by one, and placing them at the back of their hand (so they get played last). Again, the exact number of cards drawn here varies. If players started with a hand of five, three cards are drawn in this stage.

This turn sequence can be summarized with these four phrases: "Must plant, may plant," "Turn up two," "Trade and plant trades," and "Draw three cards."

=== Harvesting ===
Each bean card carries a list of how many beans of that type are needed in order to obtain one, two, three and four coins when harvesting a field. To harvest a field, a player counts the beans in it and consults the list to determine the largest amount of coins he or she can obtain from them. (If not enough beans were harvested, this may end up being none at all.) The player places that many of the cards face down in his or her treasury (each card has a coin on the back). The rest of the cards go on top of the discard pile, face up. Because some of the cards are set aside as coins, the number of cards in the deck becomes fewer with each reshuffle (in practice, the first reshuffle marks approximately halfway through the game).

As mentioned, a field containing just one bean may not be harvested by a player who also owns a field containing more than one bean.

=== Winning ===
When the deck runs out, the discard pile is reshuffled and re-used as the deck; this happens twice. The game ends instantly the third time the deck runs out. At that point, all players harvest all beans in their fields. The player with the most coins in their treasury wins. In case of a tie, the player with the most cards remaining in their hand wins the game.

Rules adapted from description at ToothyWiki:Bohnanza, as permitted by ToothyWiki:CopyrightMatters

== Expansions ==
Uwe Rosenberg and Hanno Girke have designed a number of expansions to the game, some of which were released as limited editions by Lookout Games.

Erweiterungs-Set (1997)
Adds three more bean types, allowing up to seven people to play. These beans were included in the English edition of the game. This expansion was revised by Amigo in 2001 to include an additional bean type and Order cards.
La Isla Bohnitâ (1999)
Adds two new bean types, trading ships, which help bean trading, and pirate ships, which steal beans. While the name parodies Madonna's song, the game is Rosenberg's answer to Seafarers of Catan.
High Bohn (2000)
A wild west-themed expansion (cf. High Noon) which adds buildings which can be purchased when a player cashes in a field. There is one building type for each bean type, and they each give the player a different advantage to planting, harvesting or trading. Buildings also add to a player's score at the end of the game. This expansion was revised by Amigo in 2001 to include Prohibohn, an expansion for Al Cabohne. It was released in English by Rio Grande as High Bohn Plus in 2004. The English version contains the additional material from the Amigo revision as well as the cards from the Erweiterungset revision.
Mutabohn (2001)
A GM-themed expansion. In Mutabohn, players may "mutate" their beans into less-valuable beans, allowing them to plant different crops in the same field. Bonus cards award points for specific sequences of mutations.
Ladybohn (2002)
Adds female versions of the bean types available. Players can earn more thalers by cashing in a field with a female bean at the top. Allows a two player game. This has later (2007) been reworked as Ladybohn: Manche Mögen's Heiss!
Bohnaparte (2003)
A Napoleonic expansion where players play Bohnanza to finance a military campaign to conquer the Bohnreich. Girke describes this game as "Bohnanza meets Risk".
Dschingis Bohn (2003)
Another military expansion where Mongols attack the Bohnreich (cf. Genghis Khan). Dschingis Bohn can be combined with Bohnaparte to allow seven player games. A combined version of Bohnaparte and Dschingis Bohn was released in both German and English in 2004.
Telebohn (2004)
An expansion in which hostile takeovers replace trading.
The Bohnentaler (2004)
Adds a plastic playing piece which allows a player to draw four cards instead of three. A player can only take the piece if they have enough unharvested beans in his fields.
Bohnröschen (2007)
An expansion where the players are princes hacking through the briars to reach Sleeping Beauty in her castle. Each step through the briars is represented by a card that needs to be fulfilled in game terms e.g., harvest exactly one bean from a field, and so on) before the player can move on to the next step. This is the first expansion that explicitly states that it needs either Bohnanza or Ladybohn: Manche Mögen's Heiss! to play, but many of the older expansions will work with either base game.
Auf der schwäb'schen Eisenbohn (2008)
An expansion that adds a train that travels between five cities, each of which buy beans from the players at slightly different prices. The name is derived from the German folk song "Auf de Schwäb’sche Eisenbahne".
Bohnedikt (2009)
An expansion that introduces two new types of bean fields, churches and cemeteries. Pope Benedict himself appears in the game as a wild card that can make decrees that affect trading.
Bohn To Be Wild! (2012)
Based on a western theme with caricatures of different ethnic groups.

== Spinoffs ==
Bohnanza has inspired eight spinoffs; additionally, one Amigo card game, Nicht die Bohne, is named in parody of the game.

Space Beans (1999)
A simpler game than Bohnanza. Players have one "public" and one "secret" field and can harvest when the number of beans in a field matches the number on a bean, for that number of points. The first player to harvest 30 beans wins.
Al Cabohne (2000)
A mafia-themed spinoff (cf. Al Capone) allowing solitaire and two-player games.
Bean Trader (2002)
A board game based on Bohnanza, released by Amigo and Rio Grande. The German version is called Bohnhansa which elaborates the pun as Hansestadt refers to a city in the Hanseatic League (i.e. a free port).
Rabohnzel (2005)
A spinoff which adds magic to the game of Bohnanza.
Bohnkick (2006)
A card game released in time for the FIFA World Cup 2006 in Germany. It's a soccer themed game with beans playing soccer. Most of the beans are caricatures of real soccer players (i.e. Ronaldinho, David Beckham, Zinedine Zidane etc. with Pierluigi Collina as referee).
Kannibohne (2006)
A two-player cannibal themed spinoff where the players have magic abilities which can be used to attack each other. These abilities depends on the beans planted.
Ladybohn: Manche Mögen's Heiss! (2007)
("Ladybean: Some like it hot"): This is a standalone version of Ladybohn. The title refers to the Marilyn Monroe movie Some Like It Hot (1959) and the cover depicts a female bean in Monroe's famous air vent pose from The Seven-Year Itch (1955).
Bohnanza: Dahlias (2023)
A flower-themed reimagining with dahlias instead of beans. Some gameplay elements have been changed. It was published by Amigo Spiele in 2023 and the illustrations were made by Beth Sobel (known of her work in Wingspan, Cascadia, among others).

== Reviews ==
- Pyramid
- Rebel Times #9
