= Patchwork (board game) =

Two-player board game

- Designers: Uwe Rosenberg
- Illustrators: Klemens Franz
- Publication: 2014; 12 years ago
- Players: 2
- Playing time: ~30 minutes
- Age range: 8+

Patchwork is a two-player board game created by Uwe Rosenberg. It was released in 2014.

== Gameplay ==
Players begin a game of Patchwork with five buttons, and take turns moving around a time-track board, about which are dispersed polyomino tiles representing fabric. During their turn, they may choose one of three tiles available along the path, which determines the distance travelled on the central board and the choices available to the next player. To obtain the tile, the player must ensure it will fit on their individual 9x9 grid board, and pay the associated cost in buttons. Acquired tiles become the basis of a quilt assembled on the player's individual grid board. A tile added to the player's board grants the player to move a certain number of spaces along the time-track board. The player who trails along the path on the time-track board takes the subsequent turn, or may opt to pass to move ahead on the central board, for which they collect a button for each space they were trailing the other player.

A tile assembled into the quilt earns that player a certain number of buttons. Players move their time marker until it reaches the centre of the time-track board, at which point their game is finished. The player that obtains the greatest number of buttons at the end of the game is declared the winner, but empty spaces in the assembled quilt deduct two buttons each from the player's score. A bonus tile may contribute an additional seven points to the player possessing it.

== Spin-offs ==
=== Versions ===
The original version of the game was released in 2014. This version has a green, blue, and brown color scheme. It is available in German, English, Chinese, Italian, Spanish, Polish, Korean, Japanese, Hungarian, French, Dutch, Czech, Russian, Romanian, Portuguese, Greek, Turkish, Nordic, Hebrew, Thai, Baltic, Ukrainian, and Korean. There have been three editions of the game. Current printings have the first single square "leather patch" on the board moved further down the track, as playtesting showed it to be placed too early. A correction PDF is available on the publisher's website to correct early editions.

There have been several "re-themes" of the game released where the game mechanics are not changed, but the artwork and design of some components have been modified to fit a new theme. Patchwork: Winter Edition was released in German in 2020. It was subsequently released in Hungarian, Polish, English (as Patchwork XMAS Edition), and Japanese. Patchwork: Americana Edition was released in 2020, and is currently only available. Patchwork: Halloween Edition was released in 2021 in German, English, and Spanish. Patchwork: Valentine's Day Edition was released in 2022 in English, Spanish, and Hungarian. The one exception to this is the Halloween edition. In this version several of the patches have been "rebalanced" by having their button cost or spaces moved altered.

Folklore Editions have also been released. These "re-themes" are based around different regions or cultures, and incorporate fabric designs and artwork of those regions. Patchwork: Folklore China was released in 2020 in German and Chinese. Patchwork: Folklore Taiwan was released in 2020 in German and Chinese. Patchwork: Folklore Polen was released in 2021 in German and Polish. Patchwork: Folklore Skandinavien was released in 2021 in German. Patchwork: Folklore Anden was released in 2022 in German and Spanish.

=== Expansions ===
An expansion for Patchwork titled Patchwork: Automa was released in 2018. This expansion consists of 24 cards and allows you to play solo against an artificial opponent.

=== Variations ===
Patchwork Express was released in 2018. It uses the same mechanics as the original Patchwork, but has larger tiles, fewer squares per board, and simpler scoring, making it easier for a younger audience or faster gameplay.

Patchwork DOODLE was released in 2019. This is a "roll and write" game that uses cards to represent the pieces, and has players roll a die to determine which pieces to play. Players then draw the pieces on a sketchpad board.

Stack'n Stuff was released in 2022, and deviates from the quilting theme. In this game the pieces represent furniture that is loaded on to a truck. It uses the same smaller board and larger tiles as Patchwork Express.

=== Digital Edition ===
A digital version of Patchwork was released in 2016 on Steam for PC, Mac, and Linux, and as an app on the App Store and Google Play. It was developed by DIGIDICED and published by Asmodee Digital. A version is also available to play on Board Game Arena, which was developed by user Victoria_La.

== Reception ==
Patchwork received an Official Recommendation at the 2015 Spiel des Jahres. David McMillan, in a review for board game news website Meeple Mountain, states that the game is one of Rosenberg's "finest achievements".

In a board games review by Wirecutter, Patchwork was described as being "similar to Tetris but with a sewing theme" and a "surprisingly complex challenge". McMillan states that the game is deceptively "peaceful and harmonious" on first inspection, but once the game is in progress it becomes evident that the game is "devious and cutthroat". He also states that beginners may finish their first few games with negative scores. More experienced players may play by "trying to make it impossible for [their] opponent to fill" their quilt.

An Ars Technica review described it as easy to learn, quick to play, and "filled with a surprising amount of tactics and strategy". In a review for the Games and Gaming Round Table of the American Library Association, Thomas Vose stated that Patchwork is an "incredibly satisfying, and low-key game". Vose noted that the game's numerous pieces may be a difficulty for libraries hoping to lend it in circulation, but also stated that the game is a "very polished package", with an elegant albeit simple design, and recommended it for library collections.

As of March 2023, Patchwork is ranked #5 in the "abstract" category, #14 in the "family" category, and #108 overall on BoardGameGeek.com, which is a website that includes rankings of board games based on user-submitted ratings.
