= Phase 10 =

Card game

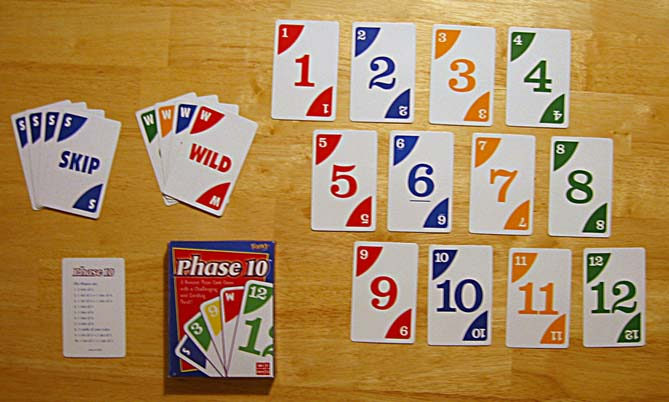
- Cards used in Phase 10 (original version with colored Wild and Skip cards)
- Designers: Kenneth Johnson
- Publishers: Mattel
- Players: Two to six
- Playing time: > 10 min per hand (4 hours, 6 players )
- Chance: High
- Skills: Saving important cards; knowing when to put down those cards; matching, ordering

Phase 10 is a card game created by Kenneth Johnson in 1982. It is based on a variant of rummy known as contract rummy. The game consists of two regular decks of cards and is named after the ten phases (or melds), which a player must advance through to win. Phase 10 is typically played by two to six people.

Phase 10 was Fundex's best-selling product, selling over 62,600,000 units as of 2016, making it the second best-selling commercial card game, behind Mattel's Uno. In December 2010, Fundex sold its license rights to Phase 10 to Mattel.

In November 2024, Phase 10 was introduced into the National Toy Hall of Fame.

== Objective ==
The object of the game is to be the first person to complete all ten phases. In the case of two players completing the last phase in the same hand, the player who completed the last phase with the lowest overall score is the winner. If those scores also happen to be tied, a tiebreaker round is played where the tying players attempt to complete phase ten (or in variants, the last phase each player had tried to complete in the previous round).

For each hand, each player's object is to complete and lay down the current phase, and then rid their hand of remaining cards by discarding them on laid-down Phases, called "hitting". The player who does this first wins the hand and scores no penalty; all other players are assessed penalty points according to the value of cards remaining in their hand.

== Mobile game ==
In 2007, Fundex and Magmic signed a deal that brought Phase 10 to BlackBerry devices. In 2009, Magmic released the title for iOS, with a Masters Edition in-app purchase available for download in February 2012. In March 2012, Magmic released both a free and paid version of Phase 10 for Android devices. In September 2013, Magmic released Phase 10 Dice in the iTunes App Store. In 2019, Mattel163 Limited released Phase 10: World Tour for Android and iOS, featuring the "Journey" mode which player travels to different worlds and completes levels by completing sets of unique different phases with opponents with different difficulties. The game also introduces Multiplayer, which players can play with others from around the world by spending "coins" and earn more coins if win, similar to the coin system in UNO!, which is another Mattel163's game.

== Reviews ==
- Games #40
