= Rüdiger Dorn =

German board game designer

Rüdiger Dorn (born 1969) is a German-style board game designer who is married and has three children. He lives in Pfofeld near Nuremberg.

== Career ==
Fantasy Flight Games published Rüdiger Dorn's fantasy-themed Dragonheart (2010).

He was nominated for the 2005 Spiel des Jahres award for his game Jambo, which also placed 8th for the Deutscher Spiele Preis award. He was also nominated for the 2007 Spiel des Jahres award for his game Die Baumeister von Arkadia (released in English as simply Arkadia) and in 2012 for Las Vegas. He also won the 2014 Kennerspiel des Jahres award for his game Istanbul. In 2016, he was once again nominated for the Spiel des Jahres with his game Karuba. In 2018 Luxor was also nominated for Spiel des Jahres.

== Working as a certified trade teacher ==
In addition to his career, Rüdiger Dorn works as a board game developer at the Gunzenhausen business school. He teaches the subjects: BSK, economic geography, people and the environment.

== Games ==
Sources:

- Treehouse Diner (2022)
- My Farm Shop (2020)
- Las Vegas Royale (2019)
- Rune Stones (2019)
- Such a crap (2019)
- Expedition Luxor (2018)
- Luxor (2018)
- Karuba (2015)
- Steam Time (2015)
- Istanbul (2014)
- Las Vegas (2012)
- Waka Waka (2012)
- Il Vecchio (2012)
- Dragonheart (2010)
- Diamonds Club (2008)
- Journey to the Centre of the Earth (2008)
- Die Baumeister von Arkadia (2007)
- Louis XIV (2005)
- Robber Knights (2005)
- Goa (2004)
- Jambo (2004)
- Traders of Genoa (2001)
- Magic Hill (2001)
- Cameo (1992)

== Awards ==
- Spiel des Jahres
  - The Merchants of Genoa : Shortlist 2001
  - Jambo : nominated 2005
  - The Builders of Arkadia : nominated 2007
  - Now it strikes 13! : Recommendation List 2007
  - Las Vegas : nominated 2012
  - Karuba : nominated 2016
  - Luxor: nominated 2018
- Kennerspiel des Jahres
  - 2014: Istanbul
- Kinderspiel des Jahres
  - Los Mampfos : nominated 2006
- Deutscher Spiele Preis (German Games Award)
  - The Merchants of Genoa : 3rd place in 2001
  - Goa : 3rd place 2004
  - Louis XIV : 1st place 2005
  - Jambo : 8th place 2005
  - The Builders of Arkadia : 6th place 2007
- Spiel der Spiele
  - The Builders of Arkadia : hit games for families 2007
- Schweizer Spielepreis (Swiss game Award)
  - Jambo : 3rd Place Strategy Games 2005
- International Gamers Awards
  - The Merchants of Genoa : nominated multiplayer games 2002
  - Goa : Nominated Multiplayer Games 2004
  - Louis XIV : nominated multiplayer games 2005
  - Jambo : nominated two-person games 2005
  - The Builders of Arkadia : nominated multiplayer games 2007
- Niederländischer Spielepreis (Dutch Game Award)
  - Goa : nominated 2005
  - The Builders of Arkadia : nominated 2007
  - Istanbul : nominated Expert Game 2015
- à la carte Kartenspielpreis
  - Gargon : 6th place in 2002
  - Jambo
