= A/state =

a/state is a 2004 role-playing game published by Contested Ground Studios.

== Gameplay ==
a/state is a game in which the setting is the isolated, gaslit dystopia of The City, where amidst decay, horror, and inhumanity, characters struggle to bring hope to themselves, their loved ones, and the wider community.

== Reviews ==
- Pyramid
- Backstab
- RPG Review (Issue 16 - Jun 2012)
- Fictional Reality (Issue 16 - Jun 2004)
- NAG
