= Balloon Cup =

2003 card game

- Box cover of Balloon Cup
- Designers: Stephen Glenn
- Publishers: KOSMOS
- Players: 2
- Playing time: 30 minutes
- Skills: Resource management

Balloon Cup is a two-player card game designed by Stephen Glenn and published by Kosmos in 2003.

The object of the game is for a player to win three of the five available trophies for flying hot air balloons. To do so, the players take turns playing a card to the table in front of one of four terrain tiles. Depending on the terrain type, which can be either mountain or plains, players will want to have high or low cards in front of them respectively, in order to claim colored cubes. Since cards can be played in front of either player, a player can help themselves or try to foil their opponent with each play. Once enough cubes of a color have been claimed, the player may cash them in to win the associated color's trophy.

== Honors ==
- 2003 Fairplay À la carte Winner
- 2003 International Gamers Award – General Strategy: Two-players
- 2003 Spiel des Jahres Recommended
- 2003 Tric Trac Nominee
