= BuyWord =

Sid Sackson letter arrangement game

- Designers: Sid Sackson
- Publishers: Face2Face Games
- Publication: 2004
- Genres: Word arrangement

Throughout this article, the unqualified use of the currency denomination "$" refers to play money in the context of the game.

BuyWord is a letter arrangement word game by American designer Sid Sackson that was published by Face2Face Games in 2004, two years after Sackson's death.

== Description ==
Buyword is a word-forming tile game for 1–4 players.

=== Components ===
- 108 letter tiles with varying numbers of pips under the letters.
- 9 labelled "Wild" tiles with one pip.
- 1 special six-sided die, with two faces labelled "choice" and other faces numbered 2 to 5.
- A supply of play money.
- A cloth bag.

=== Setup ===
The money is sorted into denominations and $200 is dealt to each player. Players are issued a certain number of wild tiles each, which varies according to the number of players. Letter tiles are placed in the bag.

=== Gameplay ===
Players take turns to act as Leader. The Leader rolls the die to determine how many tiles (2–5) will be drawn from the bag by each player that round. If the die indicates "choice" the Leader chooses any number from two to five.

Each player, on their turn, draws the chosen number of letter tiles from the bag, and then may buy or discard all of the letters. The cost of a set of tiles is equal to the square of the sum of total pips displayed on the set. For example, if a set of three letters had a total of 8 pips, the cost would be 8x8 = $64. If the player chooses to discard, the tiles are removed from the game.

After a round of buying or discarding, each player has the opportunity to sell a word, using the same formula. Players can use a single wild tile to substitute for one letter. Any player holding more than eight tiles after words have been sold must discard down to eight.

The role of Leader passes to the next person, and another round of buying and selling is played.

=== Victory conditions ===
The game ends when there are not enough tiles left in the bag to complete an entire round of buying. The player with the most money is the winner.

=== Optional rules ===
The game rules include several suggested variants, such as the Draft, where all tiles drawn in a round are put into a common pool and are drawn by players one at a time;; auctions and trades of tiles or cash; themes to be required of all words sold; and building new words in crossword fashion.

== Strategy ==
Critic Eric Mortensen pointed out, "To do well in BuyWord you need to look for bargains. You can't overspend on tiles or you will lose money even if you can use them for long words. You will encounter situations where you will have to pass on tiles because they are just not worth the amount of money that you have to spend to get them. Like all economic games you are looking for deals where you can buy low and sell high."

== Publication history ==
Game designer Sid Sackson created Buyword but died in 2002, two years before its publication by Face2Face Games. After being selected as Games 100 "Game of the Year" in 2005, a special "Game of the Year" edition was published. In 2011, a deluxe version was released.

== Reception ==
In the May 2012 edition of Games, R. Wayne Schmittberger called Buyword an "elegant boardless word game [that] deserves to become as popular as Scrabble and Boggle." Schmittberger pointed out "deciding whether to sell a short word now or try for a longer word later—that can be difficult."

Eric Mortensen, writing for Geeky Hobbies, confessed he was not sure of the idea at first, commenting, "I was skeptical of the combination [of word game and the buy/sell system] at first but I will say that two mechanics that couldn't be much different actually combine to make a fun and original word game." However, Mortensen noted the high luck factor in the game, since the tiles are drawn randomly. Mortensen also found the game was too short, writing, "In a four player game there is not a lot of time to actually make money in the game. With the game ending so quickly there is not enough time to really form a strategy and thus luck plays a larger role in the outcome of the game." Mortensen concluded, "The economic mechanics make BuyWord one of the most enjoyable word games that I have played. The mechanics of having to buy tiles low and form them into words to sell high is such a unique mechanic ... If you generally like word games and want to try something new I would highly recommend checking out BuyWord."

== Awards ==
BuyWord was the GAMES 100 Game of the Year in 2005.

== Other recognition ==
A copy of Buyword is held in the "Sid Sackson Portal" collection of the Strong National Museum of Play (object 107.873).
