= Boomtown (game) =

Boomtown is a 2004 board game published by Asmodee.

== Gameplay ==
Boomtown is a game in which players bid, scheme, and sabotage their way from humble prospector to wealthy tycoon by acquiring mines, leveraging town influence, and using chaotic action cards.

== Reviews ==
- Backstab #49 (as "La Fièvre de l'Or")
- Rebel Times #24
- Rebel Times #47 (as "Piraci: Karaibska Flota")
- Świata Gier Planszowych #18 (as "Piraci: Karaibska flota")
