= Reef Encounter =

2004 board game

- Designers: Richard Breese
- Publishers: Z-Man Games
- Players: 2–4
- Setup time: 5 minutes
- Playing time: 90 minutes
- Chance: Low
- Age range: 12+
- Skills: Strategic thought

Reef Encounter is a German-style board game first published in 2004.

== Gameplay ==
The game is played on 2, 3, or 4 separate boards depending on the number of players in which the players attempt to grow corals to feed to their parrotfish. Board space is limited, so the players' corals compete with one another for space. Corals are grown by placing polyp tiles on the board. The corals come in five different colors, and each color is weak or strong relative to each of the other colors. For example, red corals may be stronger than orange. Strong corals may overgrow weak ones, allowing the player who placed the tiles to consume the overgrown tiles. Consumed polyp tiles are strategically important, as they are required to perform certain actions and can allow a player to grow corals faster than would be possible otherwise. This hierarchy changes throughout the course of the game. All polyp tiles in a coral must be the same color.

Each player starts the game with four shrimp. When placed on a coral, the shrimp claims the coral for that player and protects adjacent tiles (but not necessarily the entire coral) from being overgrown. Shrimp may be moved freely around the boards during a player's turn.

There are a variety of actions which a player may take during their turn, including:

- Grow a coral or start a new coral by laying polyp tiles on the board. This action required a larva cube of the same color.
- Introduce a shrimp onto the board (once per turn).
- Alter the dominance hierarchy of the corals.
- As the player's last action, draft a larva cube and polyp tiles.

At the beginning of a turn, a player may have their parrotfish eat one shrimp and the coral it is on. Players who have eaten at least one shrimp may "lock" elements of the dominance hierarchy so they cannot be changed by other players. This is important strategically, as the more dominant colors are worth more points. The game typically ends when one player's parrotfish has eaten all four shrimp, or all elements of the dominance hierarchy have been locked.

== Scoring ==
Players' scores are based on the polyp tiles eaten by the parrotfish. Each tile is worth between 1 and 5 points, depending on where the tile is in the dominance hierarchy. For example, suppose the hierarchy at the end of the game is the following:

- Grey dominates pink, orange, white, and yellow.
- Pink dominates white and yellow.
- Orange dominates pink and yellow.
- White dominates orange and yellow.
- Yellow is dominated by all other colors.

In this case, grey tiles are worth five points (one point, plus one point for each of four dominated colors). Pink, orange, and white are each worth three points (one point, plus one point for each of two dominated colors). Yellow tiles, which do not dominate any other colors, are worth one point each. The player with the most points wins.
