= Le Havre (board game) =

- Box cover of Le Havre
- Designers: Uwe Rosenberg
- Publishers: Lookout Games
- Players: 1 to 5
- Setup time: 5–10 minutes
- Playing time: 30-60 minutes per player
- Chance: Very Low
- Age range: 12 and up
- Skills: Economic management, resource management, Strategic thought

Le Havre is a board game about the development of the town of Le Havre. It was inspired by the games Caylus and Agricola and was developed in December 2007.

The game was edited by Uwe Rosenberg and Hanno Girke and the former gets the main cover credit. The illustrator was Klemens Franz while the English translator was Melissa Rogerson. Numerous credits are given to others who assisted with playtesting and other tasks. The game was published by Lookout Games and distributed by Heidelberger Spieleverlag.

The game was released at Spiel 2008 in both German and Australian English, with both editions published by Lookout Games. It did not do as well as its predecessor Agricola in the Fairplay polls, with a rating of 2.51 (1 is best), but has a high rating of 7.9/10 at BoardGameGeek (a different rating system), ranking among the top 100 games and is generally considered to be highly regarded by critics.

The game was adapted into an iOS app by Codito Development Inc. and released on June 21, 2012. The game has a Metacritic rating of 82% based on 6 critic reviews.

A two player version called Le Havre: The Inland Port was released in 2012. There is also a corresponding iOS app.

== Gameplay ==
The gameplay takes place in the harbour of Le Havre, where players take goods such as fish and wood from the wharves. These goods are used either to feed the players' community, to construct buildings and ships, or are processed into finished goods. For example, a smokehouse building may be constructed in which players may process fish into smoked fish, which is more valuable.

The game is played for a set number of rounds. The winner is the player with the greatest net wealth at the end.

Points are earned by making money, building buildings and ships (which each have their own values), and selling goods. At the end of each round, players must be able to give food to their workers. The amount of food depends on the round number and the number of players, starting out low and gradually increasing as the game progresses. Players not planning ahead will soon find themselves with a shortage of food which will require taking loans from the Bank. Building ships can help with this food problem, as each ship will give the player a discount on their food each round (they count as trade routes which give the player more sources of food).
