= Battlestations (game) =

Battlestations is a 2004 board game published by Gorilla Games.

== Gameplay ==
Battlestations is a game in which one player controls hostile threats while the others crew a modular starship, racing between rooms to perform actions and maneuvering the ship on a separate space map to complete mission objectives before they—and the vessel—are destroyed.

== Reviews ==
- Pyramid
- Fictional Reality #26
