= Easter Island (game) =

2006 board game

Easter Island is a 2006 board game supplement published by Twilight Creations.

== Contents ==
Easter Island is a game in which an abstract tactical duel has two wizards position Moai statues around the island and then harness the sun's beams to topple each other's statues and claim victory.

== Reviews ==
- Pyramid
- Family Games: The 100 Best
