= Pueblo (game) =

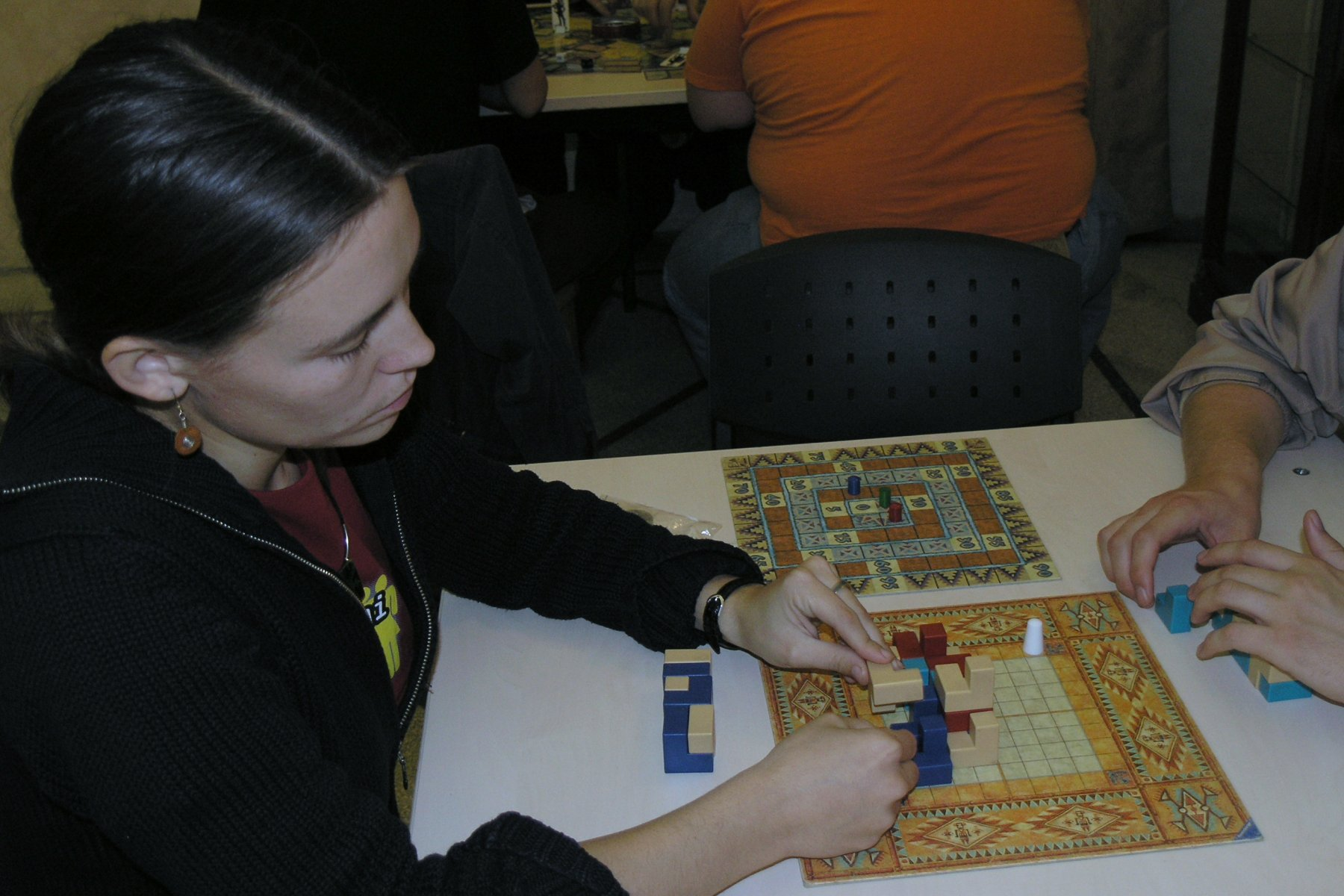
- Designers: Wolfgang Kramer/Michael Kiesling
- Publishers: Ravensburger
- Players: 2-4
- Setup time: 2 minutes
- Playing time: 30-60 Minutes
- Chance: None
- Age range: 10 and up
- Skills: Strategic thought, Spatial Visualization Ability

Pueblo is an abstract strategy game which is a competition to optimally place blocks in a constrained space. The name, theme, and artwork for the game derive from the famous architecture of Taos Pueblo, but they are very lightly applied.

== Rules ==
=== Equipment ===
A rectangular playing board. Each player has an equal number of colored and neutral blocks, all of which have the same three-dimensional shape. A Chieftain piece, and a scoring track.

=== Setup ===
Start with the board empty, the Chieftain in a corner, and with each player's neutral and colored blocks in pairs.

=== Object ===
Points are scored when the Chieftain can see any of your colored blocks. The goal of the game is to avoid scoring points.

=== Play ===
Play rotates among the players. On each move, place one new block on the board, move the Chieftain, and score the players whose colored blocks are visible to him.

== Strategy ==
The really elementary strategy is to place your blocks behind the Chieftain, but that quickly becomes impossible, as the Chieftain walks all around the board and revisits same viewpoints. The ground level of the board fills up, forcing the players to build upward.

== Variants ==
The advanced version of the game adds Sacred Sites that cannot be built upon.
