= Louis XIV (board game) =

Board game

- Box cover
- Designers: Rüdiger Dorn
- Publishers: Ravensburger; Rio Grande Games
- Players: 2 to 4
- Playing time: 100 minutes
- Age range: 12 and up

Louis XIV is a 2005 designer board game by Rüdiger Dorn. Players take on roles of members of the court of Louis XIV. The game won the 2005 Deutscher Spiele Preis.
