= Familienbande =

Card game

- Designers: Leo Colovini
- Publishers: Winning Moves
- Players: 2 to 4
- Setup time: 2 minutes
- Playing time: 20 minutes
- Chance: Medium
- Skills: Bluffing, Hand Management

Familienbande (German for Family Ties) is a card game designed by Leo Colovini.

Familienbande is a game of family inheritance, not of money, but of genetic traits. The card deck in Familienbande features an equal number of men and women. Each person on a card has three characteristics, chosen from a set of five, namely big ears, orange hair, thick lips, a big nose and glasses (to represent nearsightedness). A card's characteristics need not be different, so, for example, a man could have two symbols for big ears and one for orange hair, or three "glasses" symbols.

== Gameplay ==
Each player represents a "family" in which one of the genetic traits is dominant, and therefore wishes to pass along this trait to as many children as possible (and as many times as possible in each child). Players can do one of three things on their turn:

1. Draw a card
2. Play a card that forms a marriage, i.e. is paired with a card of the opposite sex, after which the player then draws a card.
3. Play a card as a child of a marriage that is already on the board. Most importantly, the three genetic characteristics of a child must be included in the six characteristics of its parents (e.g. so a child's one "ear" and two "lips" traits must be appear in its parents' six genetic traits). Every trait symbol on the child's card scores one point for that genetic trait times the generation number of that child. After scoring, the player may then discard a card from his or her hand, and then draw a replacement.

The game ends when the seventh child is played in the fifth "generation".

== Bluffing ==
The genetic trait of the each player's "family" is chosen randomly at the start of the game, being kept hidden from all other players and only revealed at the end of the game. The scores of all five genetic characteristics are tracked throughout the course of the game (even if there are only two players), allowing players to bluff and misdirect their opponents.

At the end of the game, players reveal their own genetic trait and are penalized for cards left in hand, the winner being the one with the highest score.
