= Space Game =

1971 artwork by Joseph Mendla

- Artist: Joseph Mendla
- Year: 1971
- Type: painted steel
- Dimensions: 210 cm × 190 cm × 140 cm (83 in × 76 in × 56 in)
- Location: 1515 West Canal Street, Milwaukee; 43°1′51.835″N 87°55′55.409″W
- Owner: Emmber Foods Inc. Administrative office, 1515 West Canal Street

Space Game is a public artwork by American artist Joseph Mendla. The piece is located at 1515 West Canal Street, in Milwaukee, Wisconsin, United States. This piece was made originally for an indoor setting to be placed as three pieces and no base. Mendlay ended up giving this piece to Peck Meat Packing Corporation. The concrete base and lights were added. Even after the Peck family sold their slaughterhouse business in the late 1980s the sculpture still remains.

== Description ==
Space Game was constructed during the years of 1972-1982 and was installed on May 20, 1982. The materials are welded steel with a concrete base and recessed lights. There are three large abstract parts to this sculpture. The farthest back and largest piece when looking from front is painted black. The middle piece is painted red and the last is painted white.

== Historical information ==
Space Game was made originally for an indoor three-piece set. Later on Mendla ended up giving it to the Peck family. The Peck family owned a Slaughterhouse business called Peck Meat Packing Corporation. When the sculpture was received they added recessed lights and a concrete base. The pieces were then put all together to form one big abstract piece. The Peck family ended up selling their business in the late 1980s but the sculpture is still located on site.

== Artist ==
Artist Joseph Mendla has a B.F.A. at the Philadelphia College of Art, also from University of Pennsylvania he received a M.F.A. in sculpture. Mendla also was the founder of the sculpture department at the Louisville School of Art. He also completed the foundry at Layton School of Art shortly after his arrival in there in 1971 . Most of Mendla's own original design was brought into the equipment at Hartbronze. Hartbronze Inc was founded by Joseph Mendla and Hilary Goldblatt. Heartbronze was at the time the only commercial foundry dedicated to solely cast-metal sculptures. The foundry was located in the Peck Meat Packing building where Space game is located.

== Condition ==
The condition of the sculpture itself is at a state of treatment urgent, last surveyed in November 1993.
