= Friedrich (board game) =

- Close-up of board in play
- Designers: Richard Sivél
- Publishers: Histogame
- Players: 3 to 4
- Setup time: 10 minutes
- Playing time: 3–5 hours
- Chance: Low
- Age range: 12 and up
- Skills: Hand management, Strategic thought
- US-distributors: Simmons Games, Rio Grande Games

Friedrich (after the German name of Frederick II of Prussia) is a strategy board game about the events of the Seven Years' War. It was created by Richard Sivél, published in 2004, and won the prize for the Best Historical Simulation by Games magazine in 2006.

== Outline of the Game ==
Three to four players command the nations that were involved in the war: Prussia (Frederick II), Russia (Elizabeth I), Austria (Maria Theresa), and France (Madame de Pompadour). In addition to those, Sweden, Hanover and the Imperial Army are also part of the game.

The game is set on a map that resembles both the topography and the political situation at the time of the Seven Years' War. The players move their nations' generals and armies and struggle for dominance in Europe. Following historic reality, Prussia fights against all the other players, who try to snatch parts of Prussia's territory by capturing strategically important cities.

Also following historic reality, the course of the game is ultimately determined by events that cannot be controlled by the players: the sudden death of Tsarina Elisabeth for example, which in reality became the turning point of the war. These events are modeled by Cards of Fate, one of which is randomly drawn after each round starting on the sixth turn. Although many of the cards have small benefits, such as allowing a general an extra movement at the end of a round or the loss or gain of a single army, four cards represent these pivotal turning points. This way, the attacking nations of Sweden, Russia, and France (requires two cards instead of one) have to quit the game one after the other, but not necessarily at the same time or in the same order. Should Prussia manage to defend itself until these three nations drop out of the war, Friedrich wins the game. Otherwise, the first attacking nation that succeeds in capturing all of its objective cities from Prussia or his ally Hanover is declared the winner. Rules exist for primary and secondary objective cities, and whether or not all the cities are required to win is dependent on which countries remain in the game. For example, Sweden only has to capture his primary objective cities and not his secondary objective cities if Russia drops out of the war.

What is noteworthy about this game is that, although the rule system is very small and simple, each of the nations has its very own character and needs to be played completely differently from all the others. Still, all the players have roughly the same chances of winning. This was achieved by elaborate statistical analysis during game development, and by delicate fine-tuning of the game's balance both in the board design and the rule system.

== Events ==
- On July 14–16, 2006, the first "Friedrich World Championship" was held in Berlin, in remembrance of the 250th anniversary of the outbreak of the Seven Years' War. The first Friedrich World Champion was Josef Gundel (GER), playing as Prussia.
- On August 31 to September 2, 2007, the "2nd Friedrich World Championship" was held in Berlin at the same locale. The Second World Champion was Anton Telle (GER), also playing as Prussia.
- The "3rd Friedrich World Championship" was held in Berlin on September 5 – 7th, 2008, with Bernd Preiß (GER) becoming the Third World Champion, playing as France.
- The "4th Friedrich World Championship" from October 30 to November 1, 2009, was won by Björn Apelqvist (SWE) as Russia.
- The "5th Friedrich World Championship" from October 1 to 3, 2010, was won by Daniel Dunbring (SWE) as Prussia.
- The "6th Friedrich World Championship" from September 30 to October 2, 2011, was won by Manfred Wichmann (GER) as Prussia.
- The "7th Friedrich World Championship" from September 28 to 30, 2012, was won by Steffen Schröder (GER) as France.
- The "8th Friedrich World Championship" from September 20 to 22, 2013, was won by Manfred Wichmann (GER) as Prussia. He was the first to win a second championship.
- The "9th Friedrich World Championship" held for the first time in the Friedrichsfelde Palace from October 3 to 5, 2014, was won by Alberto Romero Moreno (SPA) in the role of France.
- The "10th Friedrich World Championship" held in the Friedrichsfelde Palace in the Tierpark, Berlin from October 2 to 4, 2015, was won by Christian Blattner (GER) as Prussia.
- The "11th Friedrich World Championship" from September 30 to October 2, 2016, was won by Martin Höfer (GER) as France.
- The "12th Friedrich World Championship", the first of three so far to be held in AltMoabit, from September 8 to September 10, 2017, was won by Andreas Buschhaus (GER) as Russia.
- The "13th Friedrich World Championship" from September 7 to September 9, 2018, was won by Anton Telle (GER) as Prussia, his second title, 11 years after his first.
- The "14th Friedrich World Championship" from September 6 to September 8, 2019, was won by John McCullough (UK) as Prussia.
- The planned "15th Friedrich World Championship" in 2020 was cancelled due to the Covid 19 pandemic.

Since 2013, the Open Spanish Friedrich Championship (CAFE) is held in Madrid. And since 2015, the open Friedrich-UK Championship is held in York. At the beginning both tournaments were held annually, but since 2016 they alternate (even years in York, odd years in Madrid). York winners have been Guy Atkinson (SPA, 2015), Christian Blattner (GER, 2016), Richard Sivel (GER, 2018) & Alexander Schroeder (GER, 2020 - online).
