= Jambo (card game) =

2004 card game

- Designers: Rüdiger Dorn
- Publishers: Kosmos; Rio Grande Games
- Players: 2
- Setup time: 2 minutes
- Playing time: 30 minutes
- Chance: Medium
- Age range: 10 and up
- Skills: Economic management, Strategic thought

Jambo is a card game designed by Rüdiger Dorn and published in 2004 by Kosmos in German and by Rio Grande Games in English. In the game, players are African traders before colonisation buying and selling market wares. The game was nominated for the 2005 Spiel des Jahres award and also placed 8th for the Deutscher Spiele Preis award.

The title comes from "Jambo!" a greeting in the Swahili language. A comprehensive explanation/review can be found here.
