= Caylus (game) =

Board game

- Box cover of Caylus
- Designers: William Attia
- Publishers: Ẏstari Games; Rio Grande Games
- Players: 2 to 5
- Setup time: 5 minutes
- Playing time: 60–180 minutes
- Chance: None; although initial turn order and placement of the initial 6 buildings are random
- Age range: 12 and up
- Skills: Economic management, Strategic thought

Caylus is a strategy oriented, German-style board game designed by William Attia and independently published in 2005 by Ystari in France and England, and Rio Grande Games in North America. Caylus has a mix of building, producing, planning, and bargaining — without direct conflict or dice-rolling mechanics.

A card-game version, Caylus Magna Carta, was published in 2007, as well as a limited premium version of the game, with redesigned medieval-styled artwork and metallic coins. An iOS version of the game was launched in 2012.

== Game mechanics ==
The goal of Caylus is to amass the most prestige points by constructing buildings and by working on the castle of Caylus in medieval France.

Caylus does not include the random elements found in many board games, such as cards and dice. The only exceptions to this are the placement of the six neutral buildings (leading to 720 possible starting configurations) and the initial turn order, both of which are determined randomly at the beginning of the game. However, the effect of random initial turn order is minimal because players whose turn is later start off with a higher amount of money.

The basic mechanics of the game include:

=== Resources ===
- Resource cubes of five types: food (pink), wood (brown), cloth (purple), stone (gray), and gold (yellow). These are used to build buildings and the castle.
- Workers: Each player has six workers, which can be placed on buildings to harvest resources, construct more buildings, build the castle, and more.
- Bailiff: The bailiff moves either one or two spaces from his starting spot on every turn in the game. The pace of his movement can be influenced by the players through the Provost (see below). When the bailiff reaches a pre-determined space, he triggers the conclusion of a phase of construction of Caylus castle (see below). When the bailiff reaches the third such space, the game is over.
- Provost: The provost indicates by his position which of the workers placed by the players will be allowed to work on any given turn: workers ahead of him are not allowed to work. The provost's position can be influenced by the players with money (see below) or with special spaces on the board. Furthermore, if at the end of a turn the provost ends up on or behind the bailiff, then the bailiff will only move one space forward that round. If the provost is in front of the bailiff, then the bailiff moves ahead two spaces, thus shortening the game.
- Money: Caylus currency is called the denier. Deniers are used to pay workers, influence the provost to allow workers to work or to block opponents' workers from working, use the jousting field to gain royal favors (see below), and build certain buildings.
- Neutral buildings: Six neutral buildings are randomly placed at the start of the game; along with initial turn order, this is the only source of randomness in the game.
- Player buildings: By placing a worker on a construction building, a player can construct a new building; each new building has a fixed cost of 2 to 8 resource cubes (some costs being a white wildcard, allowing payment of any resource type). Once built, all players can use the new building, but the original builder gets a bonus every time an opponent uses it.
- Building the castle: By placing a worker in the castle, a player can send a "batch" of three different resource cubes (one of which must be food) to help construct the castle of Caylus and reap prestige points and royal favors.
- Royal favors: Players who contribute to the royal cause by building the castle, using the jousting field, or constructing certain buildings are granted royal favors. In the story of the game, prestige and royal favors are granted by King Philip the Fair. Royal favors can take the form of prestige points, money, resources, or discounted, unblockable access to construct buildings. These royal favors can often be the deciding factor in the game, when used cleverly.

=== Turns ===
A turn in Caylus consists of 8 phases:

1. Income. Each player receives a standard income of 2 deniers, plus any income for Residential buildings s/he owns (or prestige buildings that provide income).
2. Placement of workers. According to the turn order, players take turns placing their workers on unoccupied spaces (with some exceptions). Each worker placement costs 1 denier. The players may pass once they have placed all the workers they want (or can afford). Every time a player passes, the cost of placing additional workers on that turn increases by 1 for the other players.
3. Activation of special buildings. The special buildings (the first 5 buildings after the castle, but before the bridge) are activated, and their effects are applied.
4. The provost moves. Each player (in order of passing) has the opportunity to move the provost backward or forward by paying 1 denier per space, up to a maximum of 3. After this phase, any workers that are located after the provost are removed, as they are not allowed to work.
5. Activation of buildings. Starting with the first neutral (pink) building after the bridge, all remaining buildings activate in order.
6. Building of the castle. Players build the section of the castle (dungeon, walls, or tower) that is currently under construction. This is done in the order in which players placed their workers to build the castle.
7. The end of the turn. The bailiff moves along the road. He moves forward 2 spaces if the provost is ahead of him, and 1 space if the provost is on the same space as he or behind him. He never moves backwards. Once the bailiff has been moved, the provost is placed on the same square as the bailiff.
8. Scoring of sections. If the bailiff reaches a scoring point, or a section of the castle is completed, then that section is scored.

The player who is at the top of the turn order starts the next turn.

The game ends when the bailiff reaches the Tower scoring point, or when all the tower spaces have been built (automatically triggering the scoring of the Tower section). After the final prestige points are awarded for any leftover money and resources, the player with the most prestige points wins the game.

== Awards ==
Caylus initially gained public acclaim when it was rated the number one game of the October 2005 game fair in Essen, Germany by a public vote conducted by Fairplay Magazine. It quickly rose to become one of the most discussed and top-rated games on BoardGameGeek, a popular online board gaming forum.

Caylus also received the Trictrac d'or 2005 award from the eponymous French boardgame website.

With the international attention gained via BoardGameGeek and Essen 2005, the first printing of Caylus sold out in December 2005. A second printing was released in February 2006, including new cardboard coins to replace the gray plastic tiddlywinks-style coins from the original release. The second edition also includes the jeweler as a standard stone building tile (it was previously a promotional tile) and numerous graphic design changes to clarify certain rules.

Although Caylus was not nominated for the 2006 Spiel des Jahres, the jury awarded it a special prize (Sonderpreis Komplexes Spiel) for the best complex game of 2006. Caylus won first prize in the 2006 Deutscher Spiele Preis and Nederlandse Spellenprijs, and won the 2006 Golden Geek Awards for Best Game and Best Gamer's Game.
