= 2012 in games =

This page lists board and card games, wargames, miniatures games, and tabletop role-playing games published in 2012. For video games, see 2012 in video gaming.

== Games released or invented in 2012 ==
- 7 Wonders: Cities
- Agricola: All Creatures Big and Small
- Agricola: All Creatures Big and Small - More Buildings Big and Small
- Agricola: Belgium Deck
- Agricola: De Lage Landen
- Aikatsu!
- Android: Netrunner
- Android: Netrunner - What Lies Ahead
- Axis & Allies 1941
- Bang! 10th Anniversary
- Bolt Action
- Buffalo
- Carcassonne: Corn Circles II
- Carcassonne: The Ferries
- Carcassonne: The Flier
- Carcassonne: The Goldmines
- Carcassonne: Mage & Witch
- Carcassonne: The Messages
- Carcassonne: The Robbers
- Carcassonne: Winter-Edition
- Catan: Junior
- Conflict of Heroes: Awakening the Bear! (second edition)
- Cosmic Encounter: Cosmic Alliance
- Cthulhu Fluxx
- Deadzone
- Descent: Journeys in the Dark (second edition)
- Dixit 3
- Dixit Jinx
- Dixit: Journey
- Dominion: Dark Ages
- Dungeon Command: Curse of Undead
- Dungeon Command: Tyranny of Goblins
- Dystopian Wars
- Final Fantasy Trading Card Game
- Flash Point: Fire Rescue - 2nd Story
- Fortress America
- Four Fronts
- Force of Will
- Galaxy Trucker: Another Big Expansion
- Indigo
- Kingdom Builder: Nomads
- Las Vegas
- Last Night on Earth: Timber Peak
- Le Havre: The Inland Port
- Lords of Waterdeep
- Love Letter
- Machi Koro
- Mage Knight Board Game: The Lost Legion
- Mage Wars Arena
- Memoir '44: Equipment Pack
- Merchant of Venus (second edition)
- MethodKit
- Munchkin 8: Half Horse, Will Travel
- Mutant Meeples
- Neuroshima Hex! The Dancer
- My Singing Monsters
- Studio Pango
- Power Grid: Northern Europe/United Kingdom & Ireland
- Power Grid: Québec/Baden-Württemberg
- Qin
- Rage of Bahamut
- Return to Ravnica
- Robinson Crusoe: Adventures on the Cursed Island
- Shadows Over Camelot: The Card Game
- Small World Realms
- Star Trek: Catan
- Star Wars: The Card Game
- Star Wars: X-Wing Miniatures Game
- Sword Girls
- Terra Mystica
- Ticket to Ride Map Collection: Volume 3 - The Heart of Africa
- Uncharted: Fight for Fortune
- Wallenstein (second edition)
- War of the Ring (second edition)
- Wiz-War (eighth edition)
- Zombicide
- Zombiepox

== Game awards given in 2012 ==
- Spiel des Jahres: Kingdom Builder
- Kennerspiel des Jahres: Village
- Kinderspiel des Jahres: Schnappt Hubi!
- Deutscher Spiele Preis: Village
- Games: Tikal II: The Lost Temple
- Keyflower won the Spiel Portugal Jogo do Ano.

== Deaths ==
Date	Name	Age	Notability
January 25	Jean Wells	56	illustrator, author of the infamous original Palace of the Silver Princess
March 3	Ralph McQuarrie	82	Star Wars artist whose work has appeared in Star Wars tabletop games
March 8	Greg Novak	61	wargame designer
March 17	M. A. R. Barker	82	creator of Tékumel
June	S. Craig Taylor		Wargame designer
June 28	Norman Sas	87	Designer of Electric Football

== See also ==
- List of game manufacturers
- 2012 in video gaming
