= Mary Flanagan =

American artist

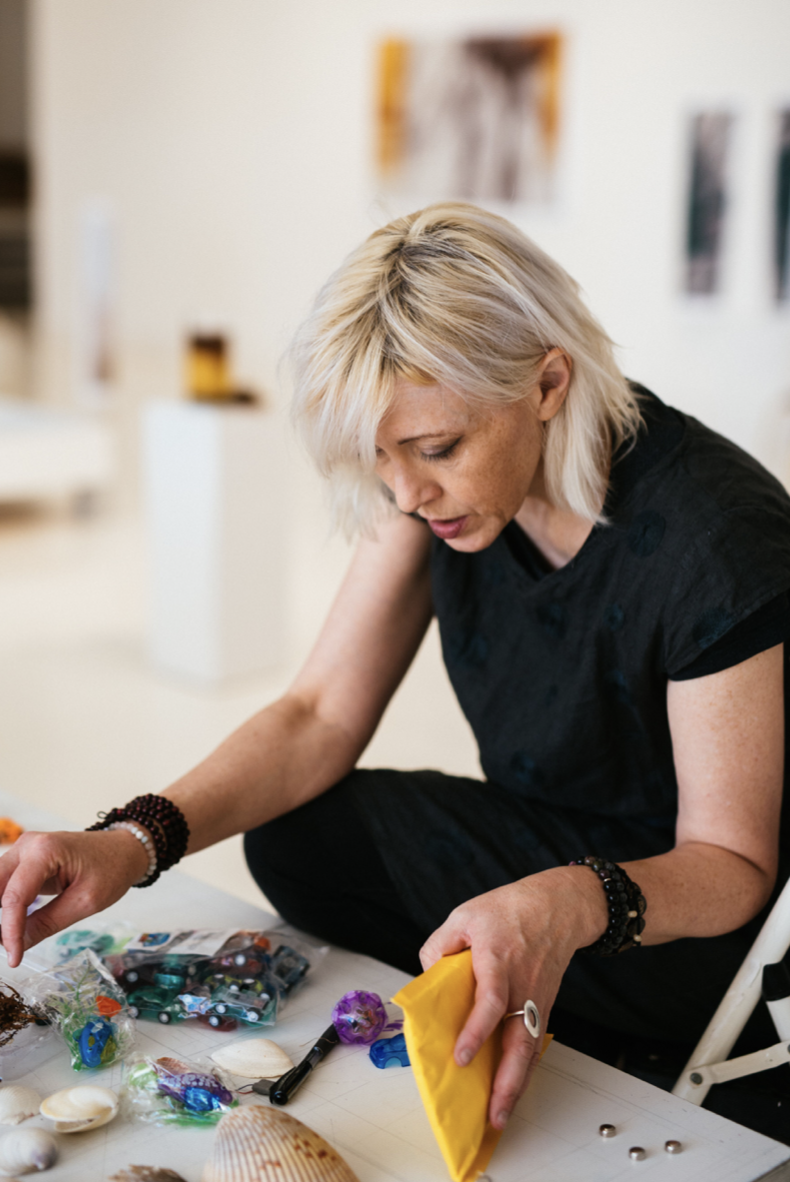
- Flanagan at work
- Known for: Sherman Fairchild Distinguished Professor in Digital Humanities, Dartmouth College professor, Director of the Tiltfactor Lab, CEO and lead designer at Resonym.

Mary Flanagan is an American artist, author, educator, and designer in the field of game studies. She is the founding director of the research laboratory and design studio Tiltfactor Lab at Dartmouth College. She is the author of scholarly books from MIT Press, including Playing Oppression: The Legacy of Conquest and Empire in Board Games, Values at Play in Digital Games, and Critical Play: Radical Game Design. She is the CEO of the board game company Resonym. Her artwork has exhibited at museums such as the Whitney Museum and The Guggenheim.

== Education ==
Flanagan graduated with a BA from the University of Wisconsin–Milwaukee, earned MFA and MA degrees from the University of Iowa, and achieved her doctorate from Central Saint Martins College of Art and Design, UK. She studied film for her undergraduate and masters work while her PhD was in Computational Media focusing on game design.

== Academic career ==
Flanagan is the inaugural chair holder of the Sherman Fairchild Distinguished Professorship in Digital Humanities at Dartmouth College, where she has served since 2008. Within the academic field of culture and technology, Flanagan developed a theory of Play Culture. Flanagan's work connects game design with social impact and human values. Tiltfactor describes its research as using games to promote learning, attitude change, and behavior change through its Critical Play method.

Awards

- (2016) Honoris Causa in Design from Illinois Tech
- (2016) The Vanguard award at Games for Change
- (2018) Award of Distinction at Prix Ars Electronica
- (2018) The Thoma Foundation Arts Writing Award in Digital Art
- (2019) DiGRA Distinguished Scholar from DiGRA
- (2022) Guinness World Record, “Largest Joystick”; from Guinness World Records

Residencies and Visiting Fellowships

- The Getty Museum
- Cornell University
- The University of Toronto

Faculty Appointments

- Salzburg Global Seminar
- The White House Office of Science and Technology Policy Academic Consortium on Games for Impact

Talks

Flanagan has given keynotes to the Association of Professional Futurists and the Games Learning and Society Conference. Flanagan was also a 2018 Cultural leader at the World Economic Forum.

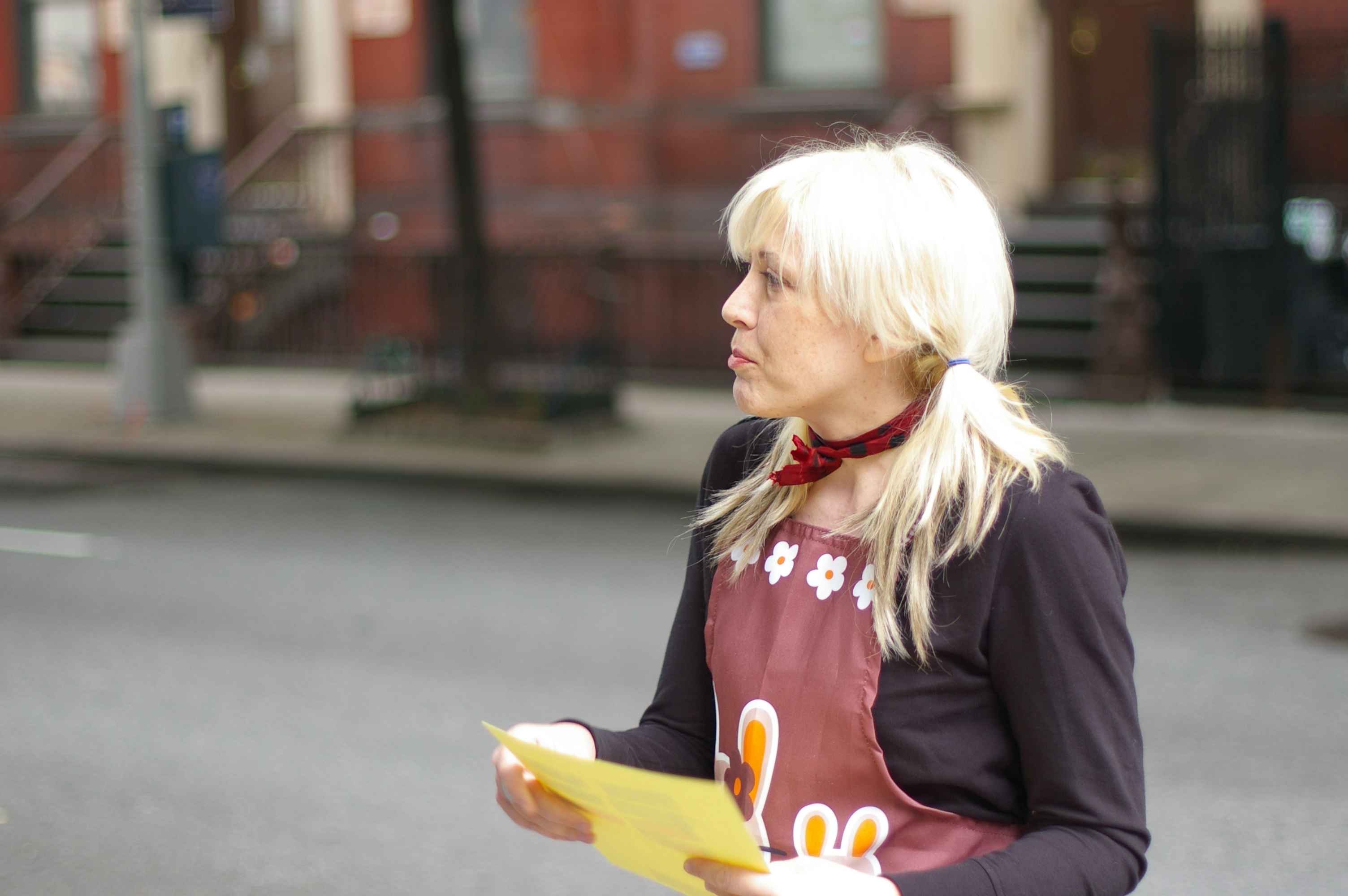
Flanagan kicking off the event at the 2009 Come Out and Play Festival.

== Writing ==
Reload: Rethinking Women and Cyberculture (MIT Press, 2002) was co-edited with Austin Booth and addresses gender issues in both fictional and real-life cyber-culture. In 2003, Reload won the Susan Koppelman Award given by the Joint Women's Caucus of Popular Culture/American Culture. Similitudini. Simboli. Simulacri (SIMilarities, Symbols, Simulacra) (Edizioni Unicopli, 2003), co-authored with Matteo Bittanti, investigates the fan culture of The Sims. re:skin (MIT Press, 2007), edited with Austin Booth, is a collection of fiction and theory exploring technology, interfaces, and the body.

Based on her PhD dissertation, Flanagan's book Critical Play: Radical Game Design (MIT Press, 2009) examines how artists and activists throughout history have used games as instruments for social critique.

Values at Play in Digital Games (MIT Press, 2014), edited with Helen Nissenbaum, features a collection of guest writers including Frank Lantz, Celia Pearce, and Tracy Fullerton.

In 2023, Flanagan published Playing Oppression: The Legacy of Conquest and Empire in Colonialist Board Games (MIT Press), co-written with Mikael Jakobsson. The book is a critique of how board games perpetuate imperialist thinking, and how play can move beyond it.

Flanagan has contributed to a number of academic journals, anthologies, and conference proceedings. She is also a poet, with poems published in journals such as The Pinch, Barrow Street, and The Iowa Review. In 2017, Flanagan published her poetry book, Ghost Sentence.

== Resonym ==
Flanagan is the CEO and creative director of Resonym. Founded in 2012, Resonym publishes original games and goods for social innovation. Resonym develops board games, card games, and digital games. Resonym designed and published Buffalo: The Name Dropping Game, Awkward Moment, Monarch and VISITOR in Blackwood Grove. Buffalo was developed using Tiltfactor Lab's research and aims to break down gender and racial stereotypes.

== Artwork ==
Flanagan's artwork deals primarily with how the design and use of technology can reveal insights into society. Other work is concerned with the representation of women in cyberculture. Her artwork has exhibited internationally at The Whitney Museum of American Art, SIGGRAPH, Ars Electronica, The Guggenheim, and Turbulence.org.

=== Selected works ===
==== [collection] ====
[collection] uses downloadable software to scan users' hard drives, glean random files, and store the collected information on a shared server. The combined data is then displayed, creating what has been described as a virtual networked collective unconscious. It has been featured in Sydney, Barcelona, and in the 2002 Whitney Biennial.

==== [domestic] ====
[domestic] (2003) is a modification of the first-person shooter game Unreal Tournament 2003. Combining elements of digital narrative and video game play, Flanagan uses the games engine to create a home-like environment that conveys images relating to a significant childhood memory of hers. On her way home from church in her hometown in rural Wisconsin, she noticed smoke coming from her family's house. She frantically raced toward it, knowing her father was inside. The work suggests internal turmoil rather than outward aggression by replacing physical battles with psychological ones. The work is featured in the book New Media Art.

==== [giantJoystick] ====
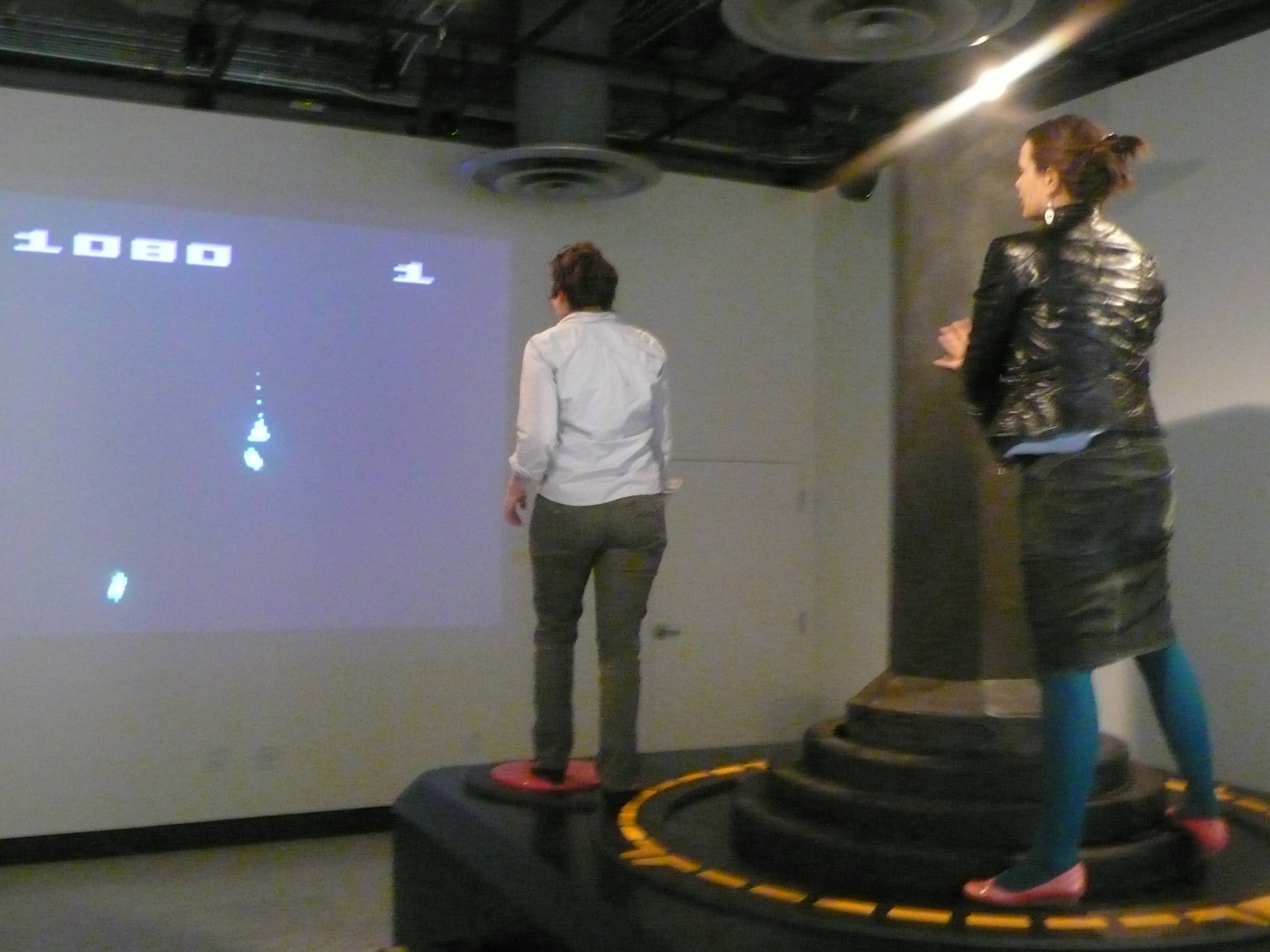
Mary Flanagan's [giantJoystick] being used collaboratively by two people to play an Atari game.

[giantJoystick] (2006) is a ten-foot-tall working joystick designed for collaborative play of Atari 2600 games. Among other exhibitions, it has appeared in the 2007 Feedback show at the Laboral Art Center, Spain and at the Beall Center in Los Angeles. Giant Joystick is now part of the permanent collection at ZKM.

==== [xyz] ====
xyz (2009) combined Flanagan's interests in virtual environments and interactive writing, allows participants to build poetry in 2-dimensional game worlds. Player-writers navigate three different worlds, each representing one axis and containing 1/3 of a larger text. As the players construct stanzas, they are projected onto a central screen combining the three disparate texts into one new work.

==== [borders] ====
borders is a 2009 video series documenting psychogeographic walks in virtual spaces around “virtual” historical sites. They are shown on monitors and projected in gallery space. The work explores borders geographically, politically, and conceptually. The walks in [borders] are beautiful, and, as though we were transported directly into Thoreau's walking shoes, one can "glimpse Elysium,” but only as Thoreau might have: Whilst walking along, surveying the boundaries and divisions. In following virtual property lines, the walker becomes stuck in stones, sent underwater, and literally teeters at the edge of the world, thus exposing the algorithmic nature of the rendering of landscape and the invisible disruptions in a seamless world. [borders] has since been exhibited in several locations including the Museum of Art, Architecture and Technology in Lisbon, Portugal in October 2019, the Museum of Fine Arts in Cologne from 2017 to 2018, and the Electronic Language International Festival in 2014.

==== [help me know the truth] ====
help me know the truth (2016) is an interactive exhibit based on the idea that everyone is constantly judging others at the same time that they are aware others are judging them. Participants would take their own pictures that would then be used in the exhibit. They would be given two slightly altered images to choose from in order to match a given word. The work used computational neuroscience to show how beliefs people have about facial features can be related to culture and identity. The work received the Award of Distinction at the 2018 Prix Ars Electronica.

==== [the mirror book] ====
In 2018, Flanagan exhibited what she refers to as a "computational collaboration," which was an installation piece done with computer software and a projector. The software, developed by Flanagan herself, was able to combine the poems of French surrealist artist Dora Maar with her own. Maar's poems would start on the left and Flanagan's on the right, then the software would merge the poems together to create new ones with different meanings than they had originally. Flanagan describes this process as a way to collaborate with the late Dora Maar.

==== [Grace: AI] ====
Grace: AI (2019) is a Feminist AI system trained to "see" by processing a dataset of tens of thousands of paintings and drawings by women artists. In Grace's origin story she first examines thousands of images of Mary Shelley's monster, Frankenstein, and then applies her learning of a female art history to the creation of portraits of her "father figure". The work first premiered in the exhibition "A Question of Intelligence" at the Sheila C. Johnson Design Center, Parsons, New York, Feb-April 2020.

== Selected Ludography ==
- Phantom Ink (2022), Spiel des Jahres nominee
- Awkward Moment (2012)
- Buffalo (card game) (2012)
- Zombiepox (2012)
- Pox: Save the People (2011)
- Grow-A-Game (2008)
