= This Must Be the Place =

This Must Be the Place may refer to:

== Film ==
- This Must Be the Place (film), a 2011 drama film directed by Paolo Sorrentino

== Music ==
- "This Must Be the Place (Naive Melody)", a 1983 song by Talking Heads
- This Must Be the Place (album), a 1985 album by Morrissey-Mullen
- This Must Be the Place, a 1992 album by Mark Korven

== Literature ==
- This Must Be the Place: Memoirs of Montparnasse, 1937, repub.1989. James "Jimmie" Charters, ed. Morrill Cody
- This Must Be the Place: The Adventures of Talking Heads in the Twentieth Century, a 2010 book by David Bowman
- This Must Be the Place, a 2008 novel by Anna Winger
- This Must Be the Place, a 2010 novel by Kate Racculia
- This Must Be the Place, a 2017 novel by Maggie O'Farrell
- This Must Be the Place (art book), 2010, featuring 43 contemporary Swedish artists
