= Ola Möller =

Ola Möller may refer to:

- Ola Möller (encyclopedist)
- Ola Möller (politician)
