= Tiltfactor Lab =

The Tiltfactor Laboratory is a serious game research center located at Dartmouth College in Hanover, New Hampshire. Its work is centered on critical play an approach that uses games and play to investigate and explain ideas. Outcomes from the lab's work range from scholarly papers and conference presentations to video games, urban games, board games, and performances. Tiltfactor's motto is "Game Design for Social Change."

Tiltfactor is engaged in producing games that combat biases and stereotypes against women in STEM; increase systems-level thinking; model effective bystander intervention in cases of sexual assault; facilitate open source metadata gathering for public institutions; create social networks to encourage altruism and prosocial behavior; and inspire new ways of thinking about health care delivery. They develop board games, card games, sports, urban games, and digital games for a variety of platforms, and publish both qualitative and quantitative research results from their controlled empirical studies.

As of September 2012, Tiltfactor is located in the Black Family Visual Arts Center at Dartmouth. Tiltfactor is supported by the National Endowment for the Humanities, Microsoft Research, the American Council of Learned Societies, and the National Science Foundation, among others.

== History ==
In 2003, Mary Flanagan founded the Tiltfactor Lab while a professor at Hunter College in New York City. Tiltfactor was the first academic game research lab in New York and early work included Rapunsel, a video game to teach young girls computer programming developed in collaboration with researchers at New York University. In 2008 Tiltfactor moved to Dartmouth College when Dr. Flanagan accepted her position as Sherman Fairchild Distinguished Professor in Digital Humanities.

== Selected games ==
Tiltfactor develops games in a variety of media for different audiences. Some of their games include:

POX: SAVE THE PEOPLE – a board game for 1 to 4 people. Players take turns vaccinating or curing members of a population against a disease outbreak. Through play, players understand group immunity and the need to vaccinate.

buffalo – a 20-minute party game where the objective is to name-drop faster than your friends and collect the most cards to win. The game was developed as part of a National Science Foundation funded project called “Transforming Science, Technology, Engineering, and Math (STEM) For Women and Girls: Reworking Stereotypes & Bias.” The two-year grant has allowed Tiltfactor to develop a number of game designs with additional assistance from the National Girls Collaborative Project, a nationwide organization that wishes to promote gender equity within STEM fields.

Awkward Moment – the game puts 3–8 players in awkward social situations. Players gather a hand of reactions cards and together face embarrassing, or stressful events. Players use decider cards to determine the basis for a winning reaction.

ZOMBIEPOX – A zombie version of Pox, Zombiepox spreads as zombies wander through town biting people. Players help the humans escape by vaccinating them, winning the game if the disease can no longer spread and losing if too many people become full-blown zombies.

POX: Save the Puppies – An extension of the POX game model, Save the Puppies is an Android game for 1–5 players in which players fight the spread of a disease that threatens to take over our pet dog populations. The game is based on the way a typical disease spreads, and players must work to contain the spread of infection by either vaccinating or curing puppies. While the game's disease is fictitious, it is based on a very real disease, Canine parvovirus.

Metadata Games – A collection of online casual games designed to help digital archivists organize visual libraries. Players tag photos, helping to increase the usefulness of image libraries.

Entangled - a virtual reality video game where players take on the role of Dr. Smith, a physicist in a science fiction world who can manipulate objects in multiple dimensions. The player uses their skills to travel through the same science lab but in many different dimensions, escaping pursuit by a shadowy enemy. Entangled has been played at the 2019 BostonFIG Fest.

The Enchanter - a digital, point-and-click adventure computer game. Players take on the role of Gertie, a potion-making character, in a fictional world where she encounters and overcomes a range of gender-related obstacles.

Replay Health – a role-playing sport where players must balance performing physical activities to score points with trying to monitor and improve their character's health. The game takes less than an hour to play, and it fosters player empathy and understanding for the many major decision points in the healthcare system.

Leechwyves and Bonesetters – an active roleplaying game in which players combat plague in medieval Europe, play groups work collaboratively to make their fiefdom the wealthiest and least plague-ridden in the land. Players are assigned characters with their own strengths and weaknesses. Each round, they must balance the goal of working their manor lord’s land with the need to visit the leechwyfe or the bonesetter to keep themselves plague-free.

Layoff – players assume the role of corporate management planning jobs cuts. In a mechanic similar to Bejewled, players match identical types of workers in groups in order to lay the workers off and increase profits. Layoff was developed in collaboration with the Rochester Institute of Technology and launched in the spring of 2009 amid significant economic turbulence in the United States. The game garnered significant attention and was played over a million times within its first week.

Vexata – Tiltfactor's first board game is designed to help middle school students develop their game literacy. Players move around the board landing on different category spaces that express either positive values such as "cooperation" or negative ideas such as "prejudice." Each square has a game mechanic associated with it that expresses its particular value or idea. By moving around the game board, players experience and learn how game mechanics can express ideas and values.

Massively Multiplayer Mushu – players use food to explore new neighborhoods, languages and cultures. Players have a number of cards with ingredients written in a variety of languages other than English. To discover what the ingredients are, players must approach strangers and ask them to help translate the ingredients. Points can also be accumulated by interviewing strangers about food-related stories and opinions, and even by convincing a stranger to return to the post-game dinner. MMM and MMS have been played at the 2008 Conflux festival, the 2009 Come Out & Play festival, and on their own.

Grow-A-Game – Developed as part of the Values At Play project, Grow-A-Game cards are a game and game design tool that help novices understand how games express ideas and help designers be more intentional about the ideas their games communicate. Also available for iPad and iPhone.

The Adventures of Josie True – Though its development began in 1999, years before Dr. Flanagan founded Tiltfactor, The Adventures of Josie True has continued to be maintained by Tiltfactor. The game was designed with four goals in mind: to increase the time 9 to 11-year-old girls spend using technology, promote heroes from under-represented groups, increase math and science skills, and change misconceptions about math, science, and technology in order to encourage girls to pursue those fields. Evaluation indicated that it accomplished its goals, effectively changing players' attitudes and increasing their interest in math, science and technology.

== Selected research projects ==
Using the critical play methodology, Tiltfactor investigates games and play culture, uses games and play as research tools, and designs games and playful events based on findings from research. Some of Tiltfactor's research projects include, but are not limited too:

Tiltfactor’s Bias project Transforming STEM For Women and Girls: Reworking Stereotypes & Bias is based on recent research which reveals the measures people and institutions can take to alter unconscious societal biases regarding girls’ achievements and interest in pursuing STEM-related careers.

Metadata Games Metadata games is a software development project in which Tiltfactor researched and created an open source game system that utilizes the idea of crowd-sourcing. Groups of people compete against one another to tag data for archives, libraries, and repositories. Funded by the National Endowment for the Humanities and the American Council of Learned Societies.

Interrupt! Health Games The Interrupt! series of games is designed to encourage physical activity and promote healthy behavior. Research in conjunction with the Dartmouth Psychiatric Research Center studies how games can be used as tools for increasing health issue awareness and healthy behavior specifically relating to HIV/AIDS, mental health, and disease prevention.

Values At Play In collaboration with researchers at NYU, this National Science Foundation funded project has produced college curricula, workshops, a game design competition, and tools to explore "values conscious" game design.

== Selected publications ==
Tiltfactor has also published a number of research papers and studies on game and play culture. Some of these works include:

Values At Play In collaboration with researchers at NYU, Tiltfactor studies the ways in which games communicate social, political, and moral values. The National Science Foundation funded project has produced college curricula, workshops, a game design competition, and tools to explore "values conscious" game design.

Lost in Translation: Comparing the Impact of an Analog and Digital Version of a Public Health Game on Players’ Perceptions, Attitudes, and Cognitions studies the impacts of nearly identical analog and digital games in facilitating learning and attitude changes about social issues, such as public health.

Citizen Archivists at Play: Game Design for Gathering Metadata for Cultural Heritage Institutions is a research paper authored in tandem with the Metadata Games project.
