= Metadata Games =

Free and open-source gaming platform

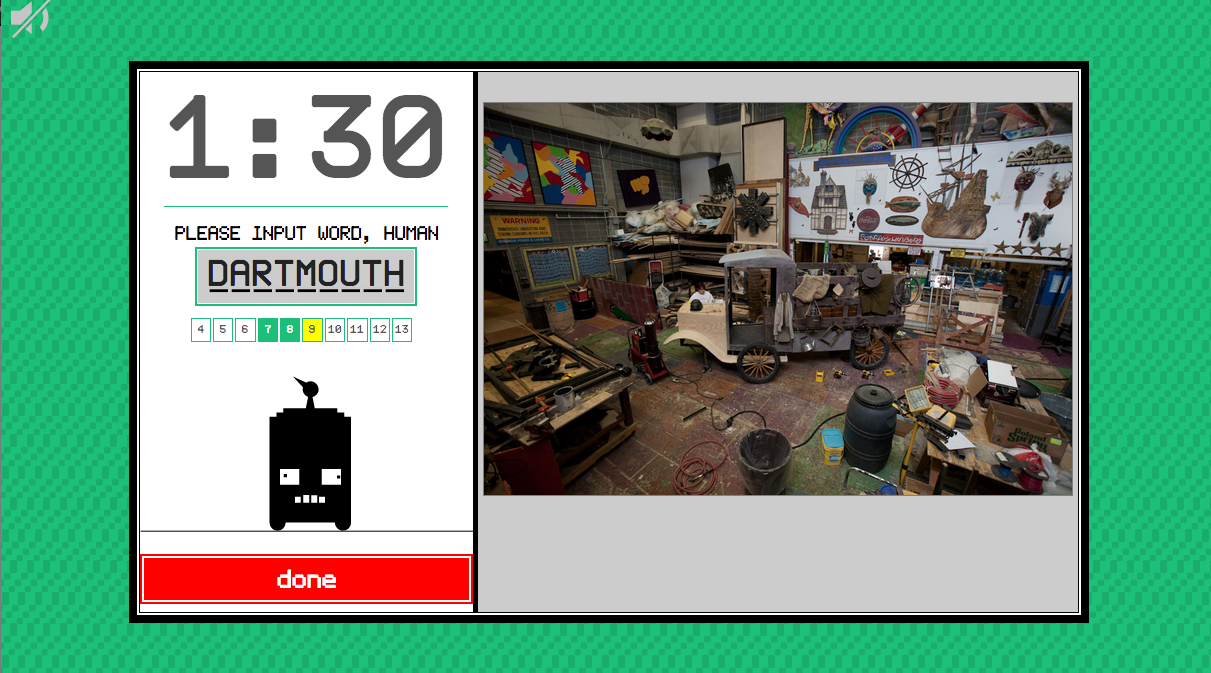
The Stupid Robot game interface.

MetadataGames is a free and open-source digital gaming platform for gathering data on photo, audio, and moving image artifacts for use by archivists and researchers. Metadata games were developed by Dartmouth College's Tiltfactor Lab with funding from the National Endowment for the Humanities, American Council of Learned Societies and the Neukom Institute for Computational Science.

Metadata Games uses digital media from: the American Antiquarian Society, the Boston Public Library, the British Library, Dartmouth College’s Rauner Special Collections Library, the Open Parks Network at Clemson University, the Sterling and Francine Clark Art Institute Library, the University of California-Irvine Library, the University of California-Los Angeles Chicano Studies Research Center, and the Worcester Polytechnic Institute.

== Games Currently Included in the Metadata Games Suite ==
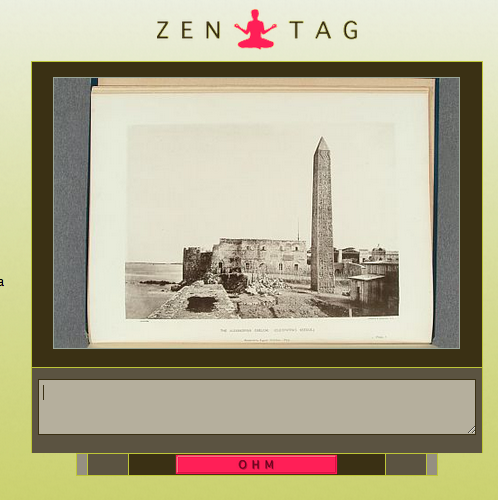
Zen Tag gaming interface.

Zen Tag is a single-player browser game. The game presents players with an image and invites them to describe the image with tags, separated by commas. Players are awarded points for the number of tags they submit.

NexTag is a single-player browser game similar to Zen Tag in which players can tag audio and video files, which are presented to players in twenty-second segments.

Stupid Robot is a single-player browser game in which players input words and try to match a words that other players have entered previously.

Guess What is a two-player game in which one player is shown an image and must provide clues to a second player, helping him or her identify the first player’s image from within a series. Points are awarded to both players based on the number of hints required for the guesser to correctly identify the image.

Pyramid Tag is a single-player game for iOS and Android devices in which players have two minutes to try to match popular tags for images with a particular number of letter spaces provided. Points are awarded for matching a higher number of words of distinct length.

OneUp is a two-player game for iOS, Android, and browsers. Players are shown the same image and must submit tags in a series of rounds. Points are awarded for submitting tags, with bonus points for matching words previously submitted and for not submitting tags their opponent has entered.

== British Library Collection Games ==
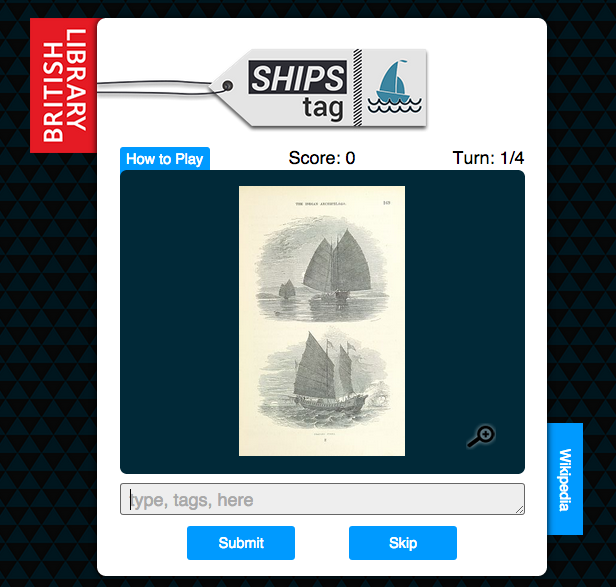
Ships Tag Gaming Interface with Wikipedia search bar.

In May 2014, three new single-player tagging games were added to the Metadata Games suite from the British Library in order to enable public users to explore and tag the British Library’s collection of over one million public domain images, which the Library posted on Flickr Commons in 2013.

Ships Tag is a single-player browser game in which players can tag a large collection of nautically-themed images. Book Tag is a single-player browser game in which players can tag parts of the British Library's large collection of books. Portrait Tag is a single-player browser game that encourages players to "name drop" famous faces from the past.

== See also ==
- Human-based computation game
