= Photo Book about Sweden =

Crowdsourced photo project, 2008–2010

The Photo Book about Sweden was a crowdsourced photo project 2008–2010, created by Ola Möller, that collected hundreds of young Swedes' pictures of Sweden, as an alternative to Sweden often depicted as a calm utopia with lakes, red and white cottages, IKEA and ABBA.

44 photographers and 64 images were chosen from over 1500 images that were sent to the project. The book was produced through crowdsourcing.

The result of the project was a book translated into seven languages. The book is available free online.

The exhibition was shown in Stockholm at Night Gallery Marie Laveau, St. Petersburg/Moscow (Russia) and Tbilisi (Georgia) at the Rustaveli Theatre. The pictures were exhibited as a part of Mi Suecia (My Sweden) in Buenos Aires in Argentina at Centro Cultural Recoleta which also contained pictures from the crowdsourced artbook This Must Be the Place, featuring 43 young Swedish contemporary artists.
