= MethodKit =

Visual Language Encyclopedia

- Designer: Ola Möller
- Publisher: MethodKit
- Release date: September 2012; 14 years ago
- Cards: 1800+
- Website: methodkit.com

MethodKit is an encyclopedia of 42 physical decks of cards that summarize different fields and disciplines through visual language. The cards are used for planning and discussing different disciplines, mostly in workshops. MethodKit was founded by Ola Möller, 2012. As of February 2019, they have released 42 card decks that have been sold in 70 countries and translated into 14 languages.

The volumes in the encyclopedia summarize areas like urban planning, public health, sustainable development and gender equality to workshop planning and product development.

The frameworks are based on research on how different professionals talk about their discipline. The most important elements of each discipline or field are then represented by cards. This is similar but a meta version of pattern language introduced by the architect Christopher Alexander 1977, which is a field of describing good design practices or patterns of useful organization within a field of expertise.
