= Mage Wars Arena =

Strategy card game

- Designers: Bryan Pope
- Publishers: Arcane Wonders
- Publication: 2012
- Players: 2 - 6
- Playing time: 90 minutes
- Chance: Dice rolling
- Age range: 13+
- Skills: Tactical, arithmetic, strategic
- Website: http://www.magewars.com/

Mage Wars Arena is a customizable strategy card game by Arcane Wonders, and is the first game in the Mage Wars series. In Mage Wars Arena players take the role of powerful and experienced mages fighting in a gladiator style arena duel. Despite being a card game, Mage Wars Arena has several significant mechanics in common with tactical miniatures games, such as movement and range, as well as having a game length more typical of tactical miniatures games.

== Gameplay / Playing Mage Wars Arena ==
The game starts with each player controlling a mage who has a book full of spells. The object of the game is to increase the enemy mage's damage until it is equal to or greater than their life. The game is divided into rounds, and each round is divided into two stages: the Ready Stage and the Action Stage. The ready stage is the "bookkeeping" stage, and includes phases for things like gaining mana and planning your spells for the round. Players can only plan two spells from their spellbook to be able to cast each round.

During the Action Stage, players take turns using creatures (such as their mage) to do an action. There are many things that actions can be used for, such as moving, attacking, guarding, or casting a spell. In addition to their normal action, mages have a special action called a quickcast action, which they can use only for casting certain kinds of spells. The quickcast action can be used directly before or after a creature's action, or in a quickcast phase, which occurs at the beginning and end of the action stage.

== Spells ==
All cards in the game are spells until they have resolved. All spells have a mana cost and an action cost. Mana is the magical energy used to cast spells. Mages gain mana equal to their channeling stat every round.

An action is what a creature does during its "turn" during the action stage. There are two types of actions: quick and full. A creature can move before using a quick action, but they cannot move before using a full action. Spells can either cost a full action or a quick action in addition to their mana cost.

Spells also have a spell point cost that must be paid before the game in order to include them in your spellbook. Every Mage in Mage Wars Arena has 120 points to spend on spellbook construction before play.

There are six types of spells: Creature, Conjuration, Enchantment, Equipment, Attack and Incantation. Creatures are beings that can use actions, conjurations are constructs and (usually) inanimate forms, enchantments are cast face down and can be "revealed" by flipping them face up later for delayed effects which can surprise the opponent. Equipments are things like weapons and armor and clothing which a mage can wear. Attack spells are spells which trigger a particular ranged attack, and incantations provide a variety of temporary magical effects. Both attack spells and incantations are discarded after use.

== Mage Wars Core Game Components ==
=== Game Board ===
The arena is a grid of 12 squares, with each mage starting in opposite corners. These squares are used gauge distance between objects, and to determine the range of various actions.

Range is measured orthogonally(horizontally and vertically) and never diagonally. Vision between objects can be blocked by walls.

=== Spellbook ===
Each Mage must have a spellbook, which is a card binder that holds all the spell cards they can cast during the game.

The Mage Wars Arena core set comes with two spellbook binders. Additional spellbook binders can be purchased for games involving more than two players and many expansions come with two spellbook binders. However, the binders are not strictly necessary to play the game.

=== Mage Status Board ===
Each player uses a Mage Status Board to keep track of his mage’s current Channeling, Damage, Life, and Mana.

=== Dice ===
==== Attack Dice ====
Attack dice are rolled during an attack to see how much damage is scored. They are also used to roll for various effects such as healing.

Each die has the sides (0,0,1,1*,2,2*) where * sides have a white starburst which signifies armour-ignoring critical damage.

==== 12-Sided Die ====
The 12-sided die (1d12) is used to check for special game effects, such as:

- Certain attacks require a 1d12 roll to determine if a special effect or condition occurs (such as stun, daze, etc.);
- When a creature tries to avoid an attack with a defense, it rolls the d12 to see if it is successful;
- Some conditions require a 1d12 roll to see if it can be removed or escaped;
- Any random movement or direction is determined by the roll of 1d12 and the compass rose printed on the game board.

=== Markers ===
==== Action Markers ====
Each player gets a set of action markers. Action markers are colored on one side, and white on the other. The colored side is different for each player. The core set comes with only two colors of action markers.

Each creature in the game receives an action marker. Action markers are used to record when a creature takes an action each turn. The different colors are used to show which player controls each creature.

At the start of each game turn, all action markers start face up (colored side up), showing that the creatures are ready to act. After a creature acts, the action marker is turned face down (white side up) to show they are finished for the turn.

==== Quick Spell Action Marker ====
As a powerful spell-caster, Mages can cast a quick spell each turn, in addition to his normal actions. The Quick Spell Action Marker is used to show whether a Mage has cast his Quick Spell or not each turn. It is used the same way as the regular Action Markers.

==== Damage Markers ====
Damage Markers are used to record damage on creatures and objects. When an object or creature receives damage equal to or greater than its life it is destroyed (removed from the game board and placed in the discard pile).

==== Mana Markers ====
Some objects in the game, such as a conjuration spawnpoint can actually channel and store their own mana. Mana markers are used to record how much mana these objects have stored.

==== Guard Markers ====
Guard markers are placed on creatures that are ―guarding.‖ Guarding allows a creature to protect its zone from intruders.

==== Ready Markers ====
A Ready Marker is placed on a creature if it has a defense. A defense is an ability to avoid an attack, such as using a shield to block or dodging. Most defenses can only be used once per game turn—the Ready Marker is flipped over when the defense has been used for the turn.

In addition to defenses, some objects in the game may call for a ready marker to keep track of whether it has been used during a turn.

All ready markers are flipped over to the ready side during the reset markers phase.

==== Condition Markers ====
These markers represent various conditions creatures and objects can receive. For example, if a creature is stunned by a lightning bolt, a stun marker is placed on the creature. If a creature becomes corroded by acid, place one or more corrode condition markers on the creature.

==== Initiative Marker ====
The initiative marker is used to keep track of which player has the initiative that turn. The player with the initiative gets to acts first during the action stage of the game turn (see game turn below). Each turn the initiative marker is passed to the next player clockwise.

=== Reference Sheets ===
The Reference Sheet shows a detailed turn order guide and valuable information to refer to during the game.

=== Glossary ===
An in-depth alphabetical glossary is included which describes all the traits, conditions, and other game terms.

=== Sideboard ===
The Mage Wars base set comes with a variety of additional spells you can use to customize each of the included Mages. A complete list of spells is enclosed in each sideboard so that you can reassemble the spellbooks to their original state at any time.

== Mages ==
In the core set, the following Mages are available to play:

- Beastmaster of Straywood
- Priestess of Asyra
- Warlock of the Arraxian Crown
- Wizard of Sortilege

In order of publication, the expansions introduced:

- Forcemaster versus Warlord
- Conquest of Kumanjaro (alternate Beastmaster and alternate Priest)
- Druid versus Necromancer
- Forged in Fire (alternate Warlock and alternate Warlord)
- Paladin versus Siren

== Schools of Magic in the Realm of Mage Wars ==
Spells belong to various schools of magic. There are 10 Schools of Magic in total: 6 major and 4 minor elemental schools. Each school is based on a different variety or type of magic, with a unique flavour and feel.

The 6 major schools are:

- Holy
- Nature
- Dark
- Mind
- Arcane
- War

The 4 minor schools of elemental magic are:

- Fire
- Earth
- Air
- Water

== Expansions ==
=== Core Spell Tome ===
The Core Spell Tome Expansion features the most important spells of the original game. If there are not as many copies as a player is allowed to have in his spellbook, or another player wants to have access to the same cards, this expansion provides additional cards.

=== Core Spell Tome 2 ===
The Core Spell Tome 2 expansion contains 110 cards that feature additional copies of the more powerful spells in the Mage Wars base game, including higher level spells and legendary creatures. Of the 110 cards, more than seventy spells are not found in the first Core Spell Tome.

=== Mage Wars: Forcemaster vs. Warlord ===
This was the first two-mage expansion set for Mage Wars, focusing on two schools of magic not emphasized in the core set: the Mind School and the War School. It introduces two brand new mages to the game, the Forcemaster and the Warlord.

=== Mage Wars: Conquest of Kumanjaro ===
This new expansion features a modified Beastmaster (Female), and a Priest (Male Priestess). This pack is unique because it has a backstory. The Johktari Beastmastress is trying to protect her jungle from the invading nation of Westlock. The expansion includes cards to enhance all the mages, but primarily builds the nature and holy schools.

=== Mage Wars: Druid vs. Necromancer ===
This expansion features two new mages, the Druid trained in the Nature and Water School and the Necromancer trained in the Dark School. This set also features 216 spell cards along with 2 Mage spellbooks tailored to both Mages.

=== Mage Wars: Forged in Fire ===
This expansion features a modified Warlock (Female) and a modified Warlord (Dwarf). Like Conquest of Kumanjaro, this is a smaller "spell tome" expansion adding new cards and special abilities for these existing mage types, and filling out the war, earth, dark and fire schools. The new Warlord's recommended spell book requires some cards from the Forcemaster vs. Warlord expansion.

=== Mage Wars: Paladin vs Siren ===
This expansion features two new mages, the Siren trained in the Mind and Water School and the Paladin trained in the Holy and War School. This set also features 216 spell cards along with 2 Mage spellbooks tailored to both Mages.

== Artwork ==
Cover artwork was created by Craig J. Spearing. Craig graduated from the Rhode Island School of Design in 1992, illustrated children's material from 1995 to 2008, and is currently doing science fiction/fantasy illustration. He lives in Portland, Oregon.

== Critiques ==
Tom Vasel, the co-host of The Dice Tower, said that he is "head over heels in love with Mage Wars". He deemed Mage Wars to be the fourth best game of all time in 2012 and the second best game of all time in 2013.
