= Ola Möller (encyclopedist) =

Ola Möller (born February 21, 1984) is a Swedish designer, author and encyclopedist who created and has maintained the MethodKit Encyclopedia since 2012. MethodKit is a visual encyclopedia and a collection of 33 decks of cards.

He authored Photo Book about Sweden, released in 2009, and was the co-author of This Must Be the Place, an art book released in 2010. Later the books were exhibited in Russia, Georgia and Argentina.
