= Pox: Save the People =

2011 board game

POX game components

Pox: Save the People (also POX: SAVE THE PEOPLE) is a board game that challenges 1-4 players to stop the spread of a deadly disease that threatens to take over the community. It was developed at the Tiltfactor Laboratory in collaboration with the Mascoma Health Initiative to help stop the spread of misinformation regarding the effects of vaccination. An iPad app of the same name was released in 2011 and won "Best Digital Game" at Meaningful Play, 2012.

== Research ==
The game, an entertaining way to explore how disease spreads, is noteworthy due to its use in teaching notions of herd immunity. Research at Tiltfactor has found that players can apply concepts and systems-level understandings learned through playing POX to problems outside the game.

== See also ==
- Zombiepox
