= Norman Sas =

American politician

- Born: Norman Anders Sas; March 29, 1925; New York City, New York
- Died: June 28, 2012 (aged 87); Vero Beach, Florida
- Education: Massachusetts Institute of Technology, MIT Sloan School of Management
- Occupations: Toy maker and inventor

Norman Anders Sas (March 29, 1925 – June 28, 2012) was an American toy inventor, mechanical engineer and manufacturer who is best known for inventing electric football, a tabletop game popular from the late 1940s until the development of video football games in the 1980s.

== Early years ==
Sas was born in New York in 1925. After graduating from the Bronx High School of Science, he served in the United States Navy and also received bachelor's degrees in mechanical engineering from the Massachusetts Institute of Technology (MIT) and business administration from the MIT Sloan School of Management after being admitted as part of the V-12 Navy College Training Program. He worked for General Electric on projects involving plastics and gas turbines after graduating from MIT.

== Tudor Games and Electric Football ==
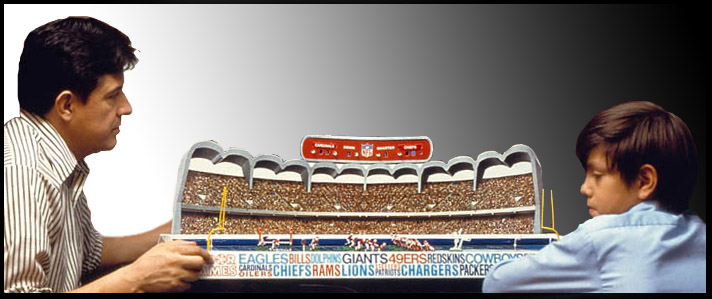
A later version of Sas's electric football game

In 1948, Sas became the president of Tudor Metal Products Corporation (later renamed Tudor Games), a company founded by his father. The company had developed table-top car and horse-racing games which used vibrations from a motor to propel figures across a metal surface. Sas developed electric football by applying the prior technology to create a game in which figures were moved across a football field by the vibrations from the motor. Sas recalled the inspiration for the game as follows: "Watching these horses run, I thought, 'Gee! If we could come up with some football figures and get them running against each other, we’d have a football game.'"

The game was released in 1949 and remained in production into the 1980s. Although no longer in production, the game maintained a following among baby-boomers who continued to play it, leading to the formation of the Miniature Football Coaches Association.

In 1967, Sas entered into a licensing agreement with the National Football League allowing the company to use team colors and player names on the game's figures. Over 40 million copies of the game were ultimately sold. Michael David Smith of NBC Sports recalled:

For the first decade or so of its partnership with the NFL, Electric Football was stunningly popular: Young football fans couldn’t get enough of strategizing with their 11 plastic players, putting them in just the right formation so that the ball carrier would vibrate his way into the end zone. Of course, the game’s motions were so unpredictable that the ball carrier was liable to go backward for a safety, but no matter: The game was pure fun.

In 2012, a book on the history of electric football and Tudor Games titled The Unforgettable Buzz was published. One of the book's authors, Earl Shores, recalled, "You'd sit there and on the 10th try your running back would turn to the left and magically go down the field for a touchdown. You played Electric Football for that one moment." Shores praised Sas for his ability to sustain the game's popularity: "To be able to run your company for 40 years with the same toy — that puts you in the same company as Monopoly."

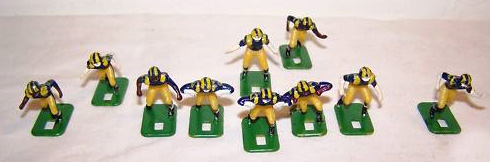
Plastic figures used in Sas's electric football game

The game's popularity waned in the development of video football games. Interviewed in 1998, Sas said, "For the first 10 years, we generated more money for NFL Properties than anyone else. Then the [video] games came out, and that was the beginning of the end."

== Later years ==
Sas lived in Alpine, New Jersey for more than 30 years, where he served on the borough council, planning board and a volunteer for the Reliance Fire Department. He was also a member of the New York Athletic Club, the Knickerbocker Country Club, and the Englewood Field Club.

Sas sold his company to Miggle Toys in the 1980s and retired in 1988. He moved to Vero Beach, Florida in the late 1990s, and died at his home there in June 2012 at age 87. He was inducted into the Miniature Football Coaches Association Hall of Fame in August 2012. Sas was survived by his wife, Irene Sas, to whom he had been married for 62 years.
