= Dystopian Wars =

- Manufacturers: Spartan Games
- Designers: Spartan Games
- Illustrators: Robin Carey, Sally Taylor, Roberto Cirillo
- Publishers: Warcradle Studios
- Genres: Steampunk Miniatures Game
- Languages: English
- Players: 2+
- Skills: Strategy, tactics, counting, wargame

Dystopian Wars is a Victorian super science-fiction miniature wargame with steampunk elements published and manufactured by Warcradle Studios. It is set in an alternate timeline in 1870. In this world, technological advances have occurred over a century before they would in our timeline, which has had dire consequences for the conduct of warfare as technology is far advanced, and in many cases, unrecognisable.

Dystopian Wars uses a range of resin models in 1:1200 scale.

The original IP for Dystopian Wars was created by Neil Fawcett and Alain Padfield and published by Spartan Games. The original artwork was created by Sally Taylor followed by Robin Carey and the original background - over 250,000 words - was written by writers Neil Fawcett, Franco Sammarco, and Lukasz Furmaniak. The designer behind the first raft of models was Chris Drew and the team was later expanded with Chris Peacey. In total this team of model makers created an array of miniatures in 1/1200th scale covering the ground, air and naval theatres of war.

Following the 1.1 version of the rulebook games designer Derek Sinclair joined the creative team, heralding a surge in the expansion of the game. Later the writing team was expanded with the addition of Josh Le Cheminant. One of the most notable aspects of the game was the way in which the rules attempted to embrace three theatres of war simultaneously.

With the closure of Spartan Games the IP for the game, along with other games such as Firestorm Armada, were put up for sale and were acquired by Warcradle Studios. At this time the company merged its own steampunk game product with that of Dystopian Wars. The game is now being expanded with new rules and models.

== Background ==
In 1845, scientist Barnabas Draynes Sturgeon led an expedition to Antarctica searching for a rumoured treasure trove of technology of unknown origin, either alien or from a lost technologically advanced civilisation. His expedition found it in a location called The Vault. Sturgeon wanted to use this technology to bring about an age of peace and bring about a scientific utopia. Instead he was betrayed by an assistant, Markov. Markov fled to Russia where he sold the technology to other nations, such as Tesla directed energy weapons to the Prussian Empire, and helped modernize the Tsar's armies. Sturgeon founded the Covenant of Antarctica to continue his mission of scientific progress, and to end the terrible war that has been unleashed by the new technologies.

Because of Markov's betrayal and the discoveries of the Vault, the nations now go to war with highly advanced vehicles and weapons. Tanks the size of castles, rockets, airships, submarines and robots all march in this new industrial war. Particle beams and lasers are used as offensive weaponry while nuclear fusion is used to propel tanks, airships, planes, naval vessels, rockets and submarines. The Covenant of Antarctica practices both covert operations and military intervention in the affairs of other nations to ensure that no side develops nuclear weapons or other weapons of mass destruction, but its technologically advance forces are hard pressed to contain the Great Powers. Gravity Nullification Engines allow ships to skim above the surface, and Time Dilation technology permits the teleportation of units across short distances. Burrowing vehicles vie for control of battlegrounds with massive mobile airfields, whilst in the skies above, flying sky fortresses and warships engage in deadly duels for aerial supremacy.

There are some political developments that also preceded comparative events in our own timeline, or else diverged. The earliest point of divergence is that Commonwealth of England industrialised in 1650 under the guidance of Oliver Cromwell, although the monarchy is apparently restored as normal later on, as Queen Victoria rules the Kingdom of Britannia in the Dystopian Wars present. Napoleon Bonaparte, Emperor of France, died in 1804, leading to a collapse of the French Empire into civil war. The Prussian Empire was strong enough at this point to launch an aggressive campaign of expansion, analogous to the Napoleonic Wars, that ended in defeat at the hands of the British Army at Waterloo in 1815. Despite this defeat, where the first landships (massive tanks) were used in battle, the Prussian Empire remained strong and forged a united Germany sooner than occurred in our timeline (including Austria). Italy, whilst not unified, is a similarly powerful League dominated by the 'Tetrarchy of Princes': the Doge of the Republic of Venice, and the Kings of the three Kingdoms, Sardinia, Lombardy and Sicily. The League took advantage of the Prussian expansion and the 1804 collapse of Austria to take back many Italian territories from other European powers. Louis Napoleon (Napoleon III in our time line) was elected president of the Republique of France in 1866, not 1848 as in our timeline.

Japan, as the Empire of the Blazing Sun, broke its geographical isolation earlier than was the case in our world and occupied Korea sooner than 1910, suffering a major defeat but learning in the process. The South won the American Civil War in this timeline, a war fought over mineral wealth not slavery (which had been abolished in 1825), and reconfigured the Union as the Federated States of America in 1864. The Polish-Lithuanian Commonwealth is not part of the Tsarist Russian Empire analogue, the Russian Coalition. Egypt overthrew French rule in 1804 and Australia is not a British colony, although India and New Zealand are. The Socialist Union of South America formed as a barrier to the expansionist objectives of the FSA and is communist in ideology. The FSA also took over the Caribbean islands and Central America, but not the Philippines, which implies that the Spanish Empire was far weaker than it was in our own timeline. The Chinese Federation and Ottoman Empire are stronger political entities in this timeline than they were in our world due to effective leadership.

== Gameplay ==
Dystopian Wars is a Victorian sci-fi game that builds upon the core aspects established by the fantasy naval game, Uncharted Seas, and the space combat game, Firestorm Armada. These systems have been advanced to allow for simultaneous combat in all three traditional theatres of war - naval, armoured and aerial.

A game of Dystopian Wars will usually last approximately two hours, but this will depend on how many players are taking part and the amount of models being utilised. Resin and pewter models from the Dystopian Wars range are used to play the game. The rules accommodate small-scale sorties into enemy territory, border skirmishes, and huge, history-defining battles. The rules can also accommodate for large multiplayer game.

The rules include the optional use of a deck of 52 Game Cards designed to improve overall game play by introducing more tactical options and by injecting some eccentric Victorian atmosphere.

== Major Nations ==
The Great Powers are nations that are currently playable and available to buy for the Dystopian Wars game. They each have a Naval and Armoured Battle Group, and a variety of other units to field.

=== Kingdom of Britannia ===
The world's greatest maritime Empire, the Kingdom of Britannia, has firmly ruled the great oceans since the decisive defeat of the Prussian Empire under Heinrich Otto at the beginning of the 19th century.

In the process, Britannian colonists and military forces have come into contact with, and gone to war against, numerous opponents. These have ranged from opportunistic French and Prussian expeditions, to other nations such as the Kingdom of Burma and even dissenting imperial subjects such as the Australian rebels.

Through it all, however, the Kingdom has successfully retained the bulk of its holdings, and even steadily expanded them, especially around the coasts of Africa in concert with its small but dependable ally, the Kingdom of Portugal.

=== Prussian Empire ===
Despite its fall from grace under the paranoid and megalomaniacal Emperor Heinrich Otto at the beginning of the century, the Prussian Empire has endured and prospered in the ensuing decades.

Through a combination of economic and military might and pursuit of a shrewd diplomatic strategy, the Prussian Empire has come to dominate Central and Eastern Europe, and even exert considerable influence in the western and southern portions of the continent.

Now under attack from the east and pressured from the west and south, the time has come for the Prussians to throw back their rivals, make their mark upon the world and cement their dominance of Europe for another century. Austria invaded Prussia at the end of the century.

=== Federated States of America ===
One of the world's newest great powers, the Federated States of America, has only existed since 1864. Prior to that, North America was dominated by the United States, composed of a combination of old Britannian, French and Spanish territories, and a large portion of what had been Mexico.

However, in the early 1860s, a dispute over the ownership of strategic industrial resources caused a political rift between the United States government and a large number of individual states. This culminated in a bid by the US federal government to use the United States military to enforce this ownership.

Led by Texas and Mississippi, the original targets of the US government's ire thanks to their rich reserves of oil and uranium respectively, the dissenting states seceded from the Union. They formed what was then called the Confederacy.

The two sides went to war in 1860 for dominance over the nation. The Confederacy eventually won out in 1864, thanks to assistance from the Kingdom of Britannia. Nathanial Adams of the New Federalist Party, elected president that year, proclaimed the Federated States of America, and set about the process of turning the nation into a world power.

=== Empire of the Blazing Sun ===
At the cutting edge of industrial and scientific research and development, yet steeped in the traditions of a bygone age, the Empire of the Blazing Sun has risen from nowhere to challenge the dominance of the established powers.

Almost an unknown quantity until recently, the Empire of the Blazing Sun came of age in the 1830s when, after a long and gruelling war, it took possession of the Kingdom of Korea. Among other boons gained after the conquest was the secret of poison gas manufacture.

Now, as the 'Little Giant' of the Pacific seeks to expand its influence, it has for the first time encountered the industrial and commercial agencies of the established powers. As much as the Empress wishes to avoid conflict, it appears that the Empire of the Blazing Sun must employ force as well as words to win their arguments.

=== Covenant of Antarctica ===
The most enigmatic of the world's great powers was, for a few years, celebrated as a great standard-bearer for scientific and technological progress. Its founder, Lord Barnabas D. Sturgeon, discovered the extraordinary Vault, a vast repository of amazing technology. He was to use the materials and scientific wonders contained within the Vault to found his own country at the foot of the world in 1857.

For a few years thereafter, the Covenant was globally feted, with embassies in every nation, and visiting teachers and lecturers at almost all of the great universities and academies. Sturgeon and his circle of advisors shared the bounty of the Vault, but as with all things that begin perfect, corruption and betrayal soon sets in.

The Covenant even purchased South Georgia Island from Britannia, turning it into a city called The Gateway, as a means for foreigners to visit the new nation. But then, in 1866, the Covenant suddenly enclosed its borders, and Sturgeon, without explanation, halted the flow of knowledge.

Almost all of the Antarctican academics left their posts and returned home. Embassies were either reduced to a skeleton staff or simply shut down. Although it is still possible to travel to The Gateway, only genuine migrants seeking citizenship are allowed to travel onwards to Antarctica proper. These people are not seen again - it is widely supposed that the nation's borders are now closed in both directions.

=== Republique of France ===
The resolute Republique of France and its people have undergone many tribulations since their experiences in the early 19th century. Once it was an imperial power that looked set to challenge the Prussians as masters of Western Europe, and the Britannians as rulers of the oceans. But these dreams were shattered by a series of catastrophic events at the dawn of the century.

Such was the speed of its fall from grace that France, which in 1804 had dictated the fate of other nations, had by 1815 been virtually reduced to the role of spectator to events. The future of Europe and a considerable part of the world besides was decided on the fields of Waterloo, but the Republique's fate was out of its hands entirely.

However, since that time, the Republique had not languished in despair. Having reached, as they saw it, the very lowest depths of hopelessness, the French spent the following decades dedicating all their efforts and energies into rebuilding their nation and its glory.

Now, as the 1870s dawn, and the world is gripped by crisis, France sees at last the chance to regain its rightful place as a great power. The self-satisfied, the naysayers and the complacent, at home and abroad, who in the past have sought to write off the Republique's fortunes will soon be proven very wrong.

=== Russian Coalition ===
The vast expanse of the Russian Coalition dominates more than one sixth of the world's entire landmass. What is all the more remarkable is that, with the exception of the distant and rugged Oblast of Alaska, across the Bering Sea, all of this vast empire is one contiguous realm. It is the product of several centuries of military conquest and political and royal union.

The Russian Coalition has existed as a single political union since the crowning of Ivan IV - known as Ivan Grozny: 'the Terrible' or 'the Fearsome' - as the first true Tsar of all Russia in the 16th century. Known as the Russian Empire before 1800, it has steadily expanded its borders, most notably under the guiding hand of Romanov Tsar Peter the Great.

Peter in particular was determined to make his empire strong through modern means. He toured Europe during his reign, determined to furnish his empire with the many technological wonders of the new industrial age, especially those he saw in Britain - steam power, early iron-plated boats and mechanised factories.

However, Romanov rule is now but a distant memory. Tsar Vladimir I Nikolaevich of the House of Rurik-Novy - New Rurik - rules now. The means by which his family achieved imperial power, and their exercise of it, has defined the modern Russian Coalition.

== Alliance Nations ==
The Alliance Nations are secondary powers established in the Dystopian Wars timeline. Players can field a variety of these units as accompanying forces to the Great Powers. The following Alliance Nations have already seen some of their units released.

=== Polish-Lithuanian Commonwealth ===
Sandwiched between the Prussian Empire and the Russian Coalition, the Polish-Lithuanian Commonwealth has always stood in a precarious position in the volatile political intrigues and territorial disputes of central and Eastern Europe. The Commonwealth is not inconsiderable in size – its lands stretch from the Baltic to the Black Sea coasts, with Riga its northernmost city and Odessa the southernmost. Formed from a union of the Kingdom of Poland and the Grand Duchy of Lithuania, the Commonwealth has a unique system of governance; the elective monarchy. The ruling King of the Commonwealth is elected by a parliamentary body known as the Sejm, which holds the real political power in the nation – in the past several kings have been dismissed from office by the Sejm which felt that their rule was proceeding counter to the best interests of the Commonwealth.

=== Dominion of Canada ===
The Dominion of Canada has long been one of Britannia's most important imperial possessions. The Canadians have a reputation for making tough and hardy soldiers, who adapt well to battlefields around the world.

Canadian designers have benefitted from contact with American scientists and engineers, thanks to Britannia's long-standing cordial relationship with the Federated States of America. They have also been able to adopt a few aspects of French engineering from sympathetic expatriates based in Quebec.

=== Kingdom of Denmark ===
Alone amongst the other Scandinavian nations, the Danes have preserved their independence despite being almost wholly surrounded by the Prussian Empire and within easy striking distance of both the Russian Coalition and the Kingdom of Britannia.

The Danes bargained their Norwegian lands to Heinrich Otto in 1810 in order to keep their homeland free. Since then, as allies of the Prussians they have prospered and Erik VIII, King of the Danes since 1852 has reinforced this situation.

=== Protectorate of Belgium ===
A key ally of the Republique of France since the grim year of 1816, the Protectorate of Belgium has historically been a region of great strategic importance to the three Great Powers. None are more aware of this than the Belgians themselves, and the nation is studded with fortifications built up over scores of years in an attempt to limit the damage caused by frequent wars.

Unfortunately, a bitter civil war between supporters of Belgium's current ruler, Protector Jean-Paul Vermeirens and the Coronet, a rebel faction led by Godeleva, self-styled 'Queen of the Belgians' has torn the nation apart. Although Vermeirens retains control of most of the country, East and West Flanders declared for the Royalists, along with most of Belgium's navy.

Vermierens asked for aid from the French and eventually the Prussians, despite lingering Belgian distrust of the latter. Meanwhile, the Royalists have sought help from the Kingdom of Britannia and its allies and the wider war has now engulfed Belgium.

The Belgian military forces are strongest on land, deploying heavily armoured home-designed Land Ships and Medium Tanks with a strong emphasis on defence. The Protectorate traditionally employs French-built equipment, but the Royalists have gained arms from the Kingdom of Britannia to bolster their forces.

=== Prussian Scandinavia ===
Prussian Scandinavia is a Dominion of the Prussian Empire and home of the powerful Teutonic Order, closely linked with the Prussian Imperial family for generations.

Any Teutonic Order fleet has access to all of the equipment available to their Prussian brothers and far to the north in Prussian Scandinavia, the forces of the Teutonic Order are mobilising their full armed strength in their old domains, with huge war engines and elite soldiers massing to take their place in the Prussian Empire front lines.

=== Other Alliance Nations ===
There are also a variety of other Alliance Nations in the Dystopian Wars universe. The following Alliance Nations are yet to be released: United Kingdom of Romania, Free Hellenic Kingdom, Belgian Royalist Rebels, Alliance Preference: Grand Coalition, Portuguese Empire, League of Italian States, Ottoman Dominions, Republic of Egypt, Spanish Republican Confederacy (SRC), Socialist Union of South America (SUSA), Free Republic of Chile, Chinese Federation, Commonwealth of Free Australia.

== Reception ==
Dystopian Wars has received mostly positive reviews from critics. The game currently holds an average rating of 7.20/10 with BoardGameGeek, based on 238 ratings. Peter Ray Allison of OneMetal describes the game as "an excellent miniatures game that has many gamers claiming Dystopian Wars as the game that got them back into gaming." Allison also describes the rules system as "refreshing", referring to its accommodation of land, sea or air engagements.

Phil Spurgeon of The Shell Case describes Dystopian Wars as "an excellent game with great ambition and superb models." Spurgeon praises the quality of the background material and the rules, but feels that the rulebook could be read better and is in need of improvement.

Raef Granger and Russ Wakelin of the D6 Generation gave Dystopian Wars a 2++ rating (97%), describing the game as very cinematic and praising the look of the models. Raef picks out the Prussian Empire Imperium Class Sky Fortress as the most iconic model in Dystopian Wars. Craig Gallant of the D6 Generation gave Dystopian Wars a 3++ rating (89%), praising the games cinematics but criticising some of the editing in the rulebook. Overall, the D6 Generation team felt that Dystopian Wars mixes exciting elements of naval gameplay, steampunk and alternative reality to offer a unique gaming experience.
