= Awkward Moment =

Party game

Awkward Moment game components

Awkward Moment is a playing-card party game. It was developed by the Tiltfactor Lab as part of a National Science Foundation-funded project called “Transforming Science, Technology, Engineering, and Math (STEM) For Women and Girls: Reworking Stereotypes & Bias.” It is a 20-minute game for middle and high school students (ages 12 and up) that places players in socially awkward circumstances. The game won Meaningful Play's Best Non-Digital Game Award in 2012.

== Gameplay ==
Players take turns assuming the role of the Decider. The Decider reveals a Moment Card that describes a humorous, embarrassing, or stressful situation for the group and a Decider Card that provides a guideline for choosing a winning Reaction. Players submit a Reaction Card from their hand face down, and the Decider selects the Reaction Card that they think is the best response to the Moment, given the Decider Card's rule.

== Research ==
The gameplay of Awkward Moment encourages players to consider other's viewpoints and assess their own biases. Data suggests that Awkward Moment strengthens associations between women and STEM and reduces people's trained biases.
