= Four Fronts =

Four-player chess variant

Four Fronts Cuatro Frentes
	a	b	c	d	e	f	g	h	i	j	k	l	m	n
14	a14 w w	b14 w w	c14 w w	d14 w w	e14 w w	f14 w w	g14 k y	h14 q y	i14 w w	j14 w w	k14 w w	l14 w w	m14 w w	n14 w w	14
13	a13 w w	b13 w w	c13 w w	d13 w w	e13 w w	f13 b y	g13 g y	h13 n y	i13 r y	j13 w w	k13 w w	l13 w w	m13 w w	n13 w w	13
12	a12 w w	b12 w w	c12 w w	d12 w w	e12 p y	f12 p y	g12 p y	h12 p y	i12 p y	j12 p y	k12 w w	l12 w w	m12 w w	n12 w w	12
11	a11 w w	b11 w w	c11 w w	d11	e11	f11	g11	h11	i11	j11	k11	l11 w w	m11 w w	n11 w w	11
10	a10 w w	b10 w w	c10 black pawn	d10	e10	f10	g10	h10	i10	j10	k10	l10 white pawn	m10 w w	n10 w w	10
9	a9 w w	b9 black bishop	c9 black pawn	d9	e9	f9	g9	h9	i9	j9	k9	l9 white pawn	m9 white rook	n9 w w	9
8	a8 black king	b8 black upside-down queen	c8 black pawn	d8	e8	f8	g8	h8	i8	j8	k8	l8 white pawn	m8 white knight	n8 white queen	8
7	a7 black queen	b7 black knight	c7 black pawn	d7	e7	f7	g7	h7	i7	j7	k7	l7 white pawn	m7 white upside-down queen	n7 white king	7
6	a6 w w	b6 black rook	c6 black pawn	d6	e6	f6	g6	h6	i6	j6	k6	l6 white pawn	m6 white bishop	n6 w w	6
5	a5 w w	b5 w w	c5 black pawn	d5	e5	f5	g5	h5	i5	j5	k5	l5 white pawn	m5 w w	n5 w w	5
4	a4 w w	b4 w w	c4 w w	d4	e4	f4	g4	h4	i4	j4	k4	l4 w w	m4 w w	n4 w w	4
3	a3 w w	b3 w w	c3 w w	d3 w w	e3 p r	f3 p r	g3 p r	h3 p r	i3 p r	j3 p r	k3 w w	l3 w w	m3 w w	n3 w w	3
2	a2 w w	b2 w w	c2 w w	d2 w w	e2 w w	f2 r r	g2 n r	h2 g r	i2 b r	j2 w w	k2 w w	l2 w w	m2 w w	n2 w w	2
1	a1 w w	b1 w w	c1 w w	d1 w w	e1 w w	f1 w w	g1 q r	h1 k r	i1 w w	j1 w w	k1 w w	l1 w w	m1 w w	n1 w w	1
	a	b	c	d	e	f	g	h	i	j	k	l	m	n
Four Fronts starting position
- Designers: Gabriel Baldi Lemonnier
- Years active: 2012 - present
- Genres: Board game, abstract strategy game
- Languages: Spanish, english
- Players: 2, 3 or 4
- Setup time: 1 minute
- Playing time: Casual games usually last 4 to 40 minutes.
- Chance: None
- Skills: tactics, strategy

Four Fronts (Cuatro Frentes in Spanish) is a board game created by the Uruguayan Gabriel Baldi Lemonnier.

== History ==
It was created in 2012 by Lemonnier, who invented and patented it as «Ajedrez Uruguayo» (Uruguayan Chess).

It is a variant of chess, for two, three or four opponents who play in pairs or individually, although when playing in pairs, partners cannot speak. It involves moving the pieces through the checkered gameboard of black or white, with the intention of capturing. To the standard board of eight by eight frames, four sections were added to the respective formations.

The pieces are 12 per player: the king, the queen, the bishop, the knight, rook and the pawn, incorporating as a novelty the prince, a piece that moves similarly to a queen. The pieces are colored white, black, yellow and red.
