= Electric Football =

Tabletop American football game

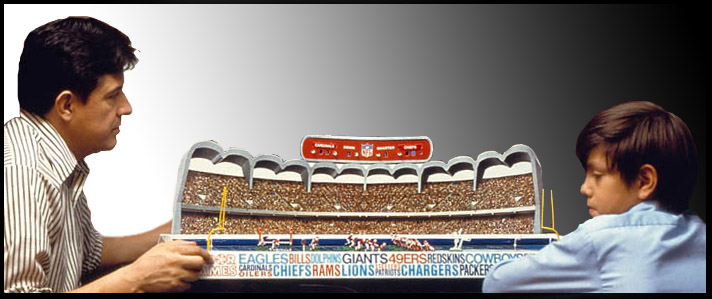
Electric Football Game

Electric Football is a tabletop American football game played on a metal vibrating field.

== History ==
Tudor's electric football with a vibrating field was not the only game in town, as this fall 1949 ad for "Super Electric Football" from the rival Electric Game Co. shows.

In 1948, Norman Sas succeeded his father, Elmer Sas, as president of Tudor Metal Products Corporation and invented Tudor Electric Football.

Norman Sas based the game on a vibrating car race game made by Tudor. The early #500 Electric Football models were the first tabletop football game which featured actual moving players as they reacted to the vibrations created by the electromagnet motor under the metal field. Passing and kicking was another unique feature of its design.

Electric Football was an immediate success and maintained popularity throughout the 1960s and 1970s. Tudor has sold 70 million Electric Football games to date. This commercial success led other toy companies to develop similar games.

Tudor produced the first all-plastic 3D players, and in the 1960s, an industrial designer named Lee Payne showed Norman Sas a more realistic set of player prototypes. Tudor introduced these players on its first large game, the #600 model. Besides figures in five different poses, Payne sold them on the idea of painting the figures using actual NFL uniform colors. He was instrumental in working with the creative services department of the NFL to obtain the license for marketing the NFL uniformed teams.

Payne began working directly for Tudor Games as head of Product Development. He created new designs with more realistic fields, crowd backgrounds, and scoreboards. Payne used a softer plastic material to develop a new player piece, the Triple Threat Quarterback, that could run, pass, and kick. In 1967 Tudor introduced its new flagship Model 620, which implemented a metal playing surface, cardboard backdrop scoreboard, NFL-style goal posts and NFL painted teams. The Model 620 set the standard for Electric Football. Tudor later introduced the Total Team Control (TTC) player base with a directional dial that allowed for finer route control and all new capabilities. In 1990, Tudor was sold to Miggle Toys.

In February 2012, Doug Strohm became president and CEO of Tudor Games. Under Strohm's leadership, Tudor re-established the NFL license, created new figures and fields and officially added products created by Electric Football hobbyists.

There are local, regional, national and international Electric Football leagues and tournaments that culminate in a World Championship tournament and convention.

== The game ==
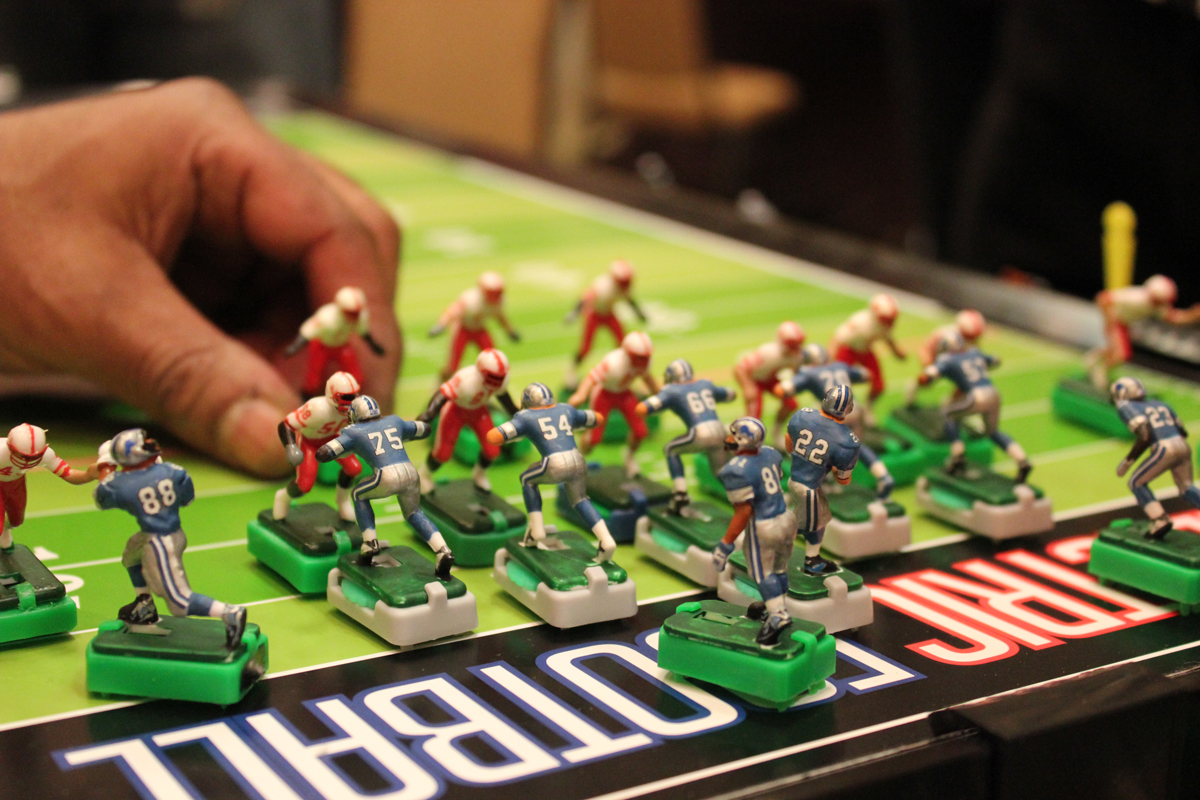
The Detroit Lions offense works deep from their end zone against the Nebraska Cornhuskers at the Electric Football World Championships.

The game is played on a metal field, which can range in size from 24 inches long by 13 inches wide up to 61 inches long by 27.5 inches wide. Detailed, plastic players on bases, which react to the vibration of the field, are placed on the field in formations, just as in real football. When the formations are completed by the offensive coach and the defensive coach, audibles in the form of pivots or motions are made in order to try to gain an advantage. A switch is activated that turns on an electric or battery powered counterbalanced motor which causes the field to vibrate and the players to move around the field.

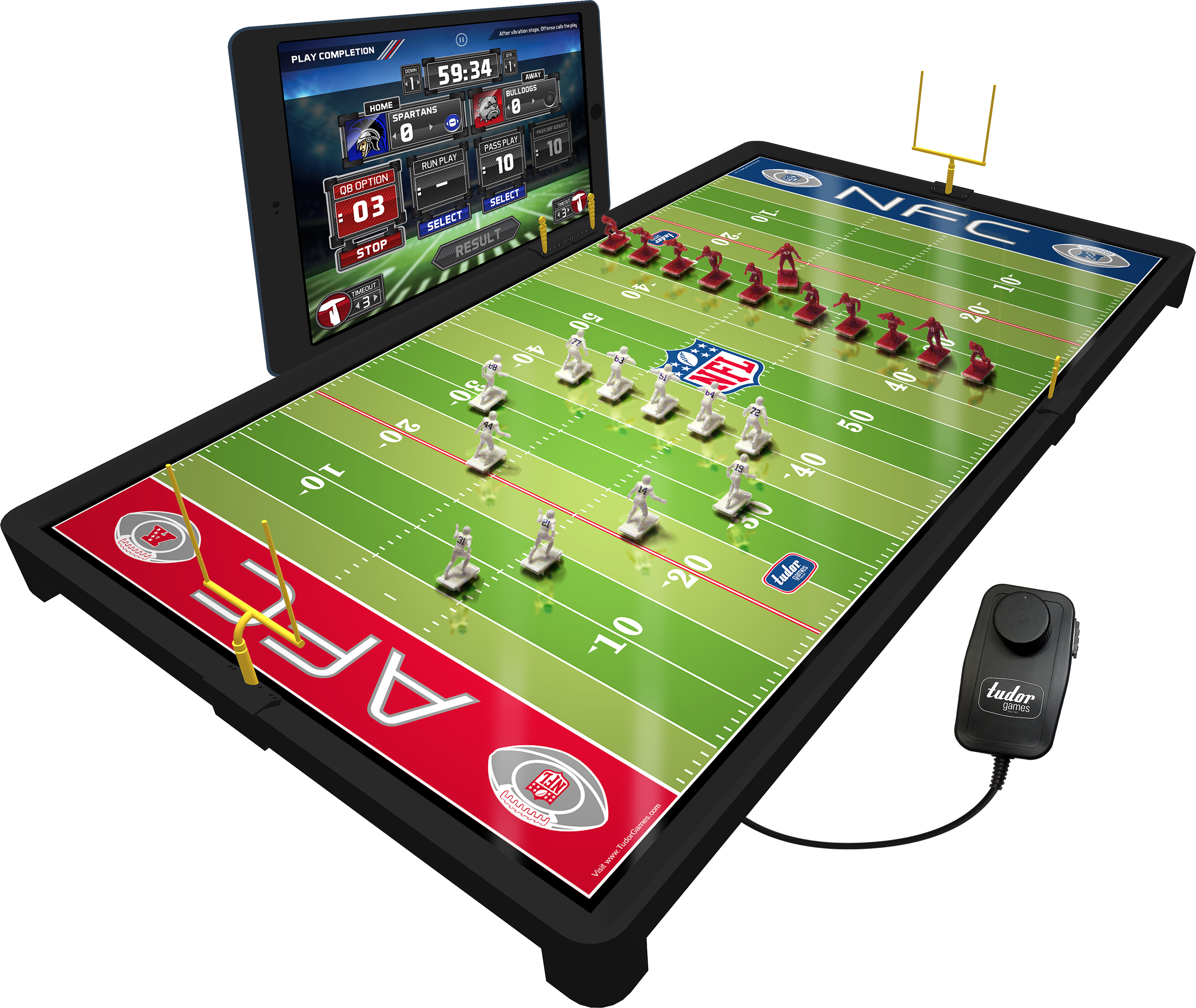
In 2016, a digital scoreboard, strategy and rules app for smart phones and tablets was added to the game of Electric Football.

As mentioned, each player is attached to a base, with "prongs" or "brushes", also known as "cleats", on the underneath of the base. These prongs can be "coached" prior to the playing of the game by using smooth mouthed pliers which stretch, shape and or flatten the prongs to get them to perform faster, stronger and in an exact route. The base in combination with a specific action figure can then be put in an on field position in the offense or defense that best makes use of the combined attributes.

Special players are used to pass, kick or punt the ball. The ball is a small slit oval piece of felt, rubberized foam or leather. The throwing Quarterback has an extended arm which the ball is placed on. The arm or the entire man can be bent backwards in order to flick the football off the arm to the intended receiver. If the ball touches the receiver figure or its base, it is considered a complete catch. Use of the throwing Quarterback is a difficult skill to master and requires practice to develop. Special players are also used for kicking and punting and have spring legs which when pulled back and released, kick or punt the ball. The original iconic quarterback that comes with the game is capable of passing and kicking and is known as the Triple Threat QB or TTQ.

In 2016, an app called Electric Football Challenge was created. The app serves as a digital scoreboard with configurable timers matching the flow of real football. The app can be enabled to do the passing and kicking in place of the traditional Triple Threat QB/Kicker. It also has a playbook containing over 45 plays and a rules section for the game.

== In popular culture ==
- Steamroller Studios and Chillingo released their version of the classic game for the iPhone and iPod Touch in September 2009, called "Super Shock Football". In January 2010 they also released an "HD" version for the iPad.
- In the film Bill & Ted's Bogus Journey, the two main characters, in a parody of The Seventh Seal, challenge Death to a series of games in order to escape Hell. One of the games Death loses is electric football.
- In an episode of the animated comedy series The Critic, a clip from a Ken Burns documentary about electric football shows an elderly man saying that "electric football is a metaphor for America: always shaking, always noisy, never really knowing where it's going" before suddenly changing his mind, saying, "Wait a minute. America's nothing like electric football. It's just a stupid game that doesn't even work!" and yelling at the cameraman to get out.
- In The Simpsons episode "Bart Star", while coaching his son's peewee football team, Homer Simpson uses an electric football table, even instructing one player to "spin around in a circle". This may be the same set that Homer received for Christmas as a boy, as mentioned in Marge Be Not Proud.
- In Bill Bryson's "The Life and Times of the Thunderbolt Kid: A Memoir," the author describes electric football as "The worst toy of the decade [the 1950s], possibly the worst toy ever built".
- In the Pinky and the Brain episode "Brain's Song" (a pun on the film Brian's Song), using an electric football game as his field, Brain broadcasts a tearjerker sports movie to Earth's entire population to make them emotionally weak and allow him to take over the world. Unfortunately, the vibrations of the game cause him to randomly vibrate when he attempts to take over the world, making him a laughingstock and foiling his plan.
- In the Fringe episode "Safe", Walter demonstrates how a substance can be rearranged to allow a solid figure to pass through it by placing a canister of rice and an action figure on a vibrating football game.

== Sources ==
- Miniature Football Coaches Association The MFCA is a 501c7 association with the following mission. “The MFCA mission is to assist the electric football hobbyist by providing an online meeting place for the direct purpose of discussing, promoting and educating the user about the game and hobby of electric football and provide an annual convention which promotes all levels of electric football play and interest. Our motto is: Integrity, Fellowship and Sportsmanship.”
- Miniature Football Coaches Association Forum A forum dedicated to the discussion of all aspects of miniature electric football. This site is made possible by The Miniature Football Coaches Association.
