= This Must Be the Place (art book) =

This Must Be the Place was an art anthology published spring 2010 in Sweden by the editors Olle Halvars-Franzén, Ola Möller, Katarina Kaliff and Carljohan Wirsell.

The book was produced through crowdsourcing. Over 2500 pictures were sent to the project and 100 of artworks from 43 artists was selected to be published in the book. Together with Photo Book about Sweden the works from the book was exhibited at Centro Cultural Recoleta in Buenos Aires together with the Swedish embassy under the name Mi Suecia.
