= Dungeon Command =

- Years active: 2012–present
- Genres: Board game
- Players: 2 to 4

Dungeon Command is a board game first published in 2012 by Wizards of the Coast. It was created by Rodney Thompson.

== Overview ==
Dungeon Command is a board game that comes in separate packs that are intended to be combined with each another.

== Gameplay ==
Dungeon Command is a competitive miniatures game that can be played by two to four players, with a tactical aspect to its game play that involves a card system.

== Contents ==
Each of the twelve-character starter sets comes as a box containing tiles that are used to build the dungeon or outdoor setting, and includes twelve miniatures, Order and Character cards, and counters for tracking damage. Titles for packs include Sting of Lolth, Heart of Cormyr, Tyranny of Goblins, Curse of Undeath, Blood of Gruumsh.

== Reception ==
Ben Kuchera of Penny Arcade called Dungeon Command an example of the "love of experimentation" shown by Wizards of the Coast to "take the world of Dungeons & Dragons and zoom in and out to varying degrees". Dave Banks from Wired commented on Dungeon Command: "These fast-paced, constantly changing games are both incredibly fun and intensely satisfying … and they're unlike any D&D game you've ever played in the past".

DieHard GameFan said that "with only two sets to pick from, there's not a lot to sustain interest in Dungeon Command. It's a fun game, but don't expect the variety, customization or popularity of the old D&D minis game – and thus it'll be a lot harder to find people to play against".

In a review of Dungeon Command in Black Gate, John ONeill said: "Like all great fantasy games, it's a thrill just to open the box and fondle the contents. If you've enjoyed any of the compatible games — the D&D Adventure System board games (or you've used miniatures or Dungeon Tiles for your D&D game) — the possibilities are immediately apparent".
