= Buffalo (card game) =

Match-making card game

Buffalo game components

Buffalo is a 2012 card game that requires players to think of people or characters who match combinations of descriptions. It was developed by the Tiltfactor Laboratory as part of the National Science Foundation (NSF) funded project called "Transforming Science, Technology, Engineering, and Math (STEM) For Women and Girls: Reworking Stereotypes & Bias." The game was runner-up for Best Digital Game in the 2012 Meaningful Play Awards.

== Gameplay ==
In each round, players race to make matches using cards listing noun and adjective descriptors. The first to shout out the name of a real person or fictional character who matches the descriptors on two or more word cards, claims the matched cards, and flips over a new noun/adjective pair. When the deck runs out, the player who collected the most cards wins. Whenever players are unable to make a match, someone adds another card from both decks to the table.

== Research ==
Initial data suggests that Buffalo reduces prejudice and encourages greater inclusiveness in players’ representations of social identity groups. The research study showed that thinking about stereotypical and nonstereotypical trait pairings increases social identity complexity, a psychological construct linked to tolerance of members outside one's group.
