= Zombiepox =

2012 board game

ZOMBIEPOX game components

Zombiepox (also ZOMBIEPOX) is a cooperative board game in which players fight the spread of zombies that threaten to take over the town. It was developed by Tiltfactor Laboratory, a game research center located at Dartmouth College, New Hampshire, focusing on games and play that investigate and explain ideas.

== History of the game ==
Zombiepox is an evolution of Pox: Save the People, which was developed by Tiltfactor in coordination with the Mascoma Valley Health Initiative to stop the spread of misinformation concerning the effects of vaccination. Zombiepox is also designed to be educational and initial research showed that people's sentiments on vaccinations became more positive when faced with the fictitious disease in the game. Playing the game also appears to improve people's systems thinking abilities.

== Gameplay ==
Designed as a board game for one to four players, the game centers on a town that has been infected with a disease called zombiepox. The objective is to stop the spread and help humans escape by vaccinating them. Players win the game if the disease can no longer spread and lose if too many people become full-blown zombies.

== Awards and recognition ==
The game won a Major Fun Award for Cooperation Thinking in 2012. It was also selected for display at IndieCade's 2012 Indie Game Showcase.
