= Ra (board game) =

Auction-based board game by Reiner Knizia

- Cover of the Rio Grande edition
- Designers: Reiner Knizia
- Illustrators: Frank Vohwinkel
- Publishers: Alea; Rio Grande Games; Überplay
- Publication: 1999
- Players: 2 to 5
- Setup time: 5 minutes
- Playing time: 45 - 60 minutes
- Chance: Medium
- Age range: 12 and up
- Skills: Auction

Ra is a board game for two to five players designed by Reiner Knizia and themed around Ra, the sun-god of Heliopolis in ancient Egyptian culture. It is one of three auction games designed by Knizia, the others being Medici and Modern Art.

Originally published in Germany, it was republished in an English language translation by Rio Grande Games. Subsequent English language editions have been published by Überplay and again by Rio Grande Games. The last of these increased the number of players from the original 3-5 to 2-5, but otherwise all editions have used the same rules. Ra won the 2000 International Gamers Award and placed 2nd in the 1999 Deutscher Spiele Preis.

== Gameplay ==
Ra is an auction game, in which the players compete for the same resources. The game is played in three rounds, called Epochs, reflecting the history of ancient Egypt. Players use their sun tokens to bid against each other on auctions for tiles. At the end of an epoch, points will be scored for the number and types of tiles a player managed to win. The price of the tiles is determined by the players bidding for them, and values can shift rapidly.

Players are faced with a constant balance between "what should be done eventually" and "what can actually be done now", which is a hallmark of many of Knizia's games, and of German-style board games in general.

== History ==
Ra was published in 1999 by Alea in Germany. In an interview with Funagain Games, Knizia explains how he created the game : "Ra actually has a good story behind it; it was the first game I did after my retirement. Two or three weeks after my retirement I said, 'Okay, now let's get started.' That's the time, when I do a big game, that the world around me stops. I concentrate on this game and nothing else. And since I had more time, this concentration became even more extreme. For four to six weeks I did nothing but work on this game. "

Almost immediately the game was picked up for distribution and English translation by Rio Grande Games. Rio Grande owner Jay Tummelson explains how he chose Ra for distribution so early in its life: "Games I like are likely to be liked by others. With Ra, I saw it at Essen last year and decided I would like to do it in English. I approached Alea and offered to do it. We negotiated and I did it. I try to get involved earlier in the process…. I am working with some companies on games they are considering for next year, but have not decided on final theme or look."

999 Games published a Dutch edition of Ra in the Netherlands in 2000. Besides these three officially published language translations, fans of the game have translated the rules into Hungarian, Italian, Spanish, and French. All of these translations, along with reviews, photos, and discussions about the game can be found on BoardGameGeek.com, a board game database and fan community.

Ra quickly sold out, and was out of print for several years. In October 2005 Überplay reprinted the English version. The Überplay edition has minor differences from earlier editions: slightly larger tiles, a slightly larger board, a cloth sack to pull the tiles from, a smaller box (thanks to the board being quad-fold), a scoring summary printed on the board, and marks on tiles to indicate which are kept at the end of a round. In 2005 Knizia, working with Michael Menzel, also designed a new game called Razzia, which is the basic game of Ra with a mafia theme.

A third edition of Ra was published by Rio Grande Games in 2009. This increased the range of the number of players to 2-5 from the 3-5 of earlier editions.

A fourth edition and re-print of Ra was published by 25th Century Games in 2022. This included new artwork from Ian O'Toole and a complete graphical redesign. Among the updates were more clear tile artwork and player boards with slots for each tile type along with scoring reminders. Previously, seasoned players would use a community-made player board to keep their tiles and remind them of scoring, as well as which tiles were discarded at the end of each epoch. 25th Century Games also printed a new Pharoah Edition, a deluxe version with wooden tiles and metal scoring pieces, and a Sun God Edition with acrylic tiles and a Traders Expansion included.

== Reception ==
A review in Ars Technica stated that Ra "might just be the best auction game".
