= Kingdoms (board game) =

German-style board game

- Box cover of Kingdoms
- Designers: Reiner Knizia
- Publishers: Fantasy Flight
- Publication: 2002
- Players: 2-4
- Setup time: 5 minutes
- Playing time: 15 - 45 minutes
- Chance: Medium (tile drawing)
- Age range: 8 and up
- Skills: Adding, subtracting and multiplying, Tactics

Kingdoms is a German-style board game for 2-4 players designed by Reiner Knizia and released in 2002 by Fantasy Flight. The game is based on Knizia's original German game Auf Heller und Pfennig, but has been given a Medieval Fantasy theme.

In 2003, Kingdoms won the Origins Award for Best Abstract Board Game of 2002.

== Rules ==
Players take turns drawing tiles from a stack and laying them on an orthogonal grid, representing a kingdom being settled. Tiles can be either resources (with value +1 to +6) or hazards (-1 to -6). The sum of all tile values on a row or column determines the score for that row or column. A special case is the mountain tile, which splits the row and column it occupies into two, so that each section is scored separately.

Players may also play castle tiles, ranked 1 through 4. To score points from a row or column, a player must have a castle there; castles score the points of the row and column they occupy times the rank of the castle. This score may be a negative number. A player has a limited number of castles; castles other than rank 1 cannot be reused.

There are three special tiles, besides the mountain tile mentioned above: the dragon, the gold mine and the wizard. The dragon negates all resources in the row and column it occupies, leaving only the hazards. The gold mine doubles the value of that row and column. And the Wizard raises the castle-level of any adjacent castles by 1.

When the grid has been filled, the round ends, rows and columns are scored and each player earns points. The board is emptied and play continues for three rounds.

== Strategy ==
Players cannot move tiles once they have been placed. They must also play their castle tiles when there are still empty places on the board, else they risk not scoring the best rows and columns. This requires tactical thinking; each player must balance the need to score points with the risk of having their valuable castles negated with a dragon or hazard tile later in the round.
