= Tigris and Euphrates =

Board game

- Designers: Reiner Knizia
- Publishers: Hans im Glück
- Genres: Tabletop game
- Players: 2–4
- Setup time: 5 minutes
- Playing time: 90 minutes
- Chance: Low
- Skills: Strategy

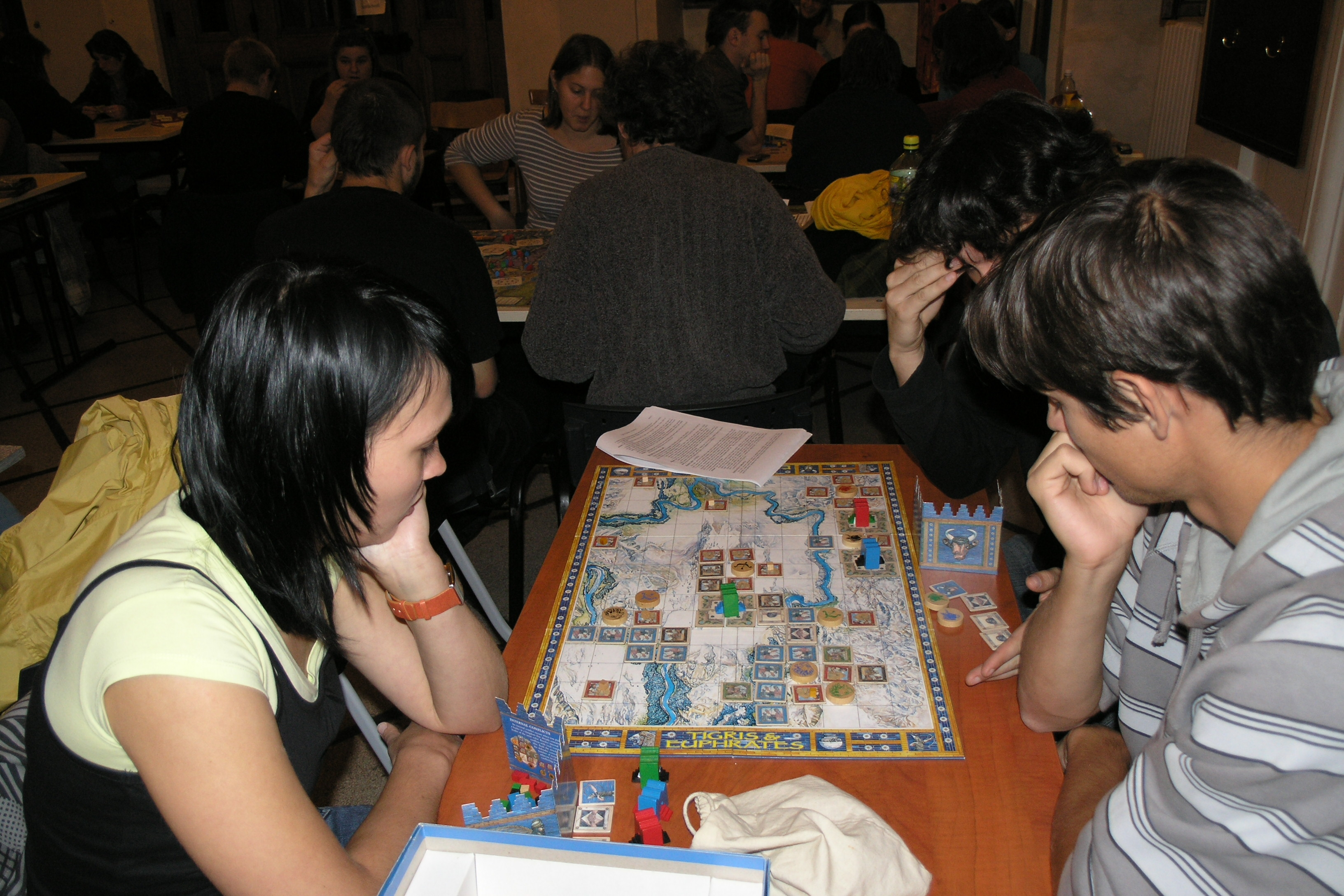

Tigris and Euphrates (German: Euphrat und Tigris) is a tabletop eurogame designed by Reiner Knizia and first published in 1997 by Hans im Glück. Before its publication, it was highly anticipated by German gamers hearing rumors of a "gamer's game" designed by Knizia. Tigris and Euphrates won first prize in the 1998 Deutscher Spielepreis. A card game version was released in 2005.

The game is set as a clash between neighboring dynasties at the dawn of civilization and is named after the rivers Tigris and Euphrates, in Mesopotamia. The rivers together formed natural borders for several grand ancient civilizations, including Sumer, Babylonia, and Assyria.

== Gameplay ==
The game can be played by two, three, or four people. Play offers both tactical and strategic objectives. As with many games, short-term objectives gain prominence when more players participate, as they have fewer chances to follow up on previous moves. Luck plays a role, as players draw tiles from a bag, but it is rarely decisive. Players may selectively discard and redraw their tiles at the cost of one "action point", of which each player has two per turn. The game does not use dice.

The board is a map of the two rivers, marked with a square grid. There are four types of tiles with corresponding leaders: temples and priests (red), farms and farmers (blue), markets and merchants (green), and settlements and kings (black). The game starts with ten isolated temple tiles already placed on the board. Players put tiles and leaders onto the board, creating and expanding regions and kingdoms. Monuments may be built on the board when four tiles of the same color are played into a square pattern.

Two leaders of one type cannot coexist in the same kingdom. Internal conflicts are caused by players adding a second leader of a type to a kingdom. External conflicts are caused by players placing tiles to merge two existing kingdoms.

During the game, players collect points in each of the four colors as a result of playing tiles, resolving conflicts and controlling monuments. After the final round, each player sorts his or her points by color, including "treasures" that they have acquired, which count as any color the player wishes. In order to limit specialization, the player with the most points in their weakest category wins.

For example:

- Alice has 6 black, 8 red, 12 green, and 12 blue points; thus has a score of 6.
- Bob has 9 black, 10 red, 7 green, and 15 blue points; thus has a score of 7.
- Charlie has 14 black, 14 red, 5 green, and 20 blue points; thus has a score of 5.

Players must balance their scoring and avoid overspecializing. Knizia later used this mechanism as the basis for Ingenious.

== Reception ==
Thomas Lehmann comments: "If you are looking for a tactically rich, intense strategy game with lots of conflict (unusual in a German game), try Tigris & Euphrates and see why so many players consider this game Reiner Knizia's masterpiece."

== Reviews ==
- Backstab #9
- Pyramid
- Rebel Times #8
