= The Princes of Florence =

Board game

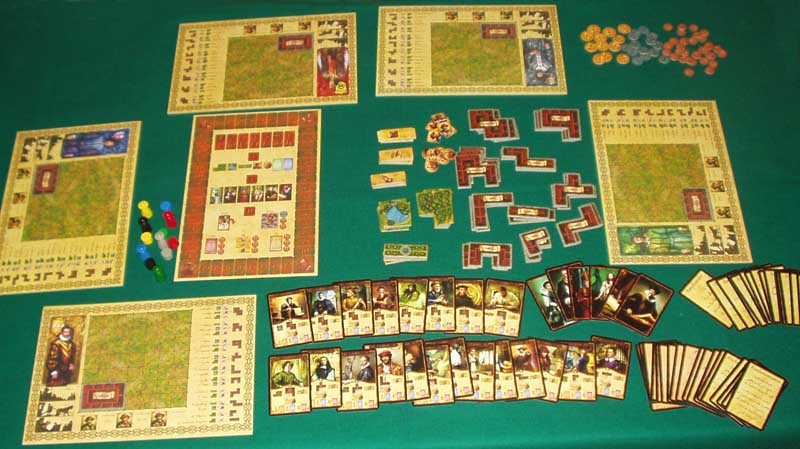
- A game in progress.
- Designers: Wolfgang Kramer and Richard Ulrich
- Publishers: Alea; Rio Grande Games
- Players: 2 to 5
- Setup time: 5–10 minutes
- Playing time: 60–120 minutes
- Chance: Medium
- Age range: 12 and up
- Skills: Economic management, Strategic thought, City Building

The Princes of Florence is a German board game designed by Wolfgang Kramer and Richard Ulrich published in 2000 by Alea in German and by Rio Grande Games in English. Players assume the roles of Florentine Princes who wish to design their own villas to allow artists to create great works of prestige. Through seven rounds, each containing an auction phase and two action phases, the Princes pay for landscaping, buildings, freedoms, and various services and bonuses. At the end of the seven rounds, whoever has the most Prestige Points wins.

The release of a revised edition has been announced by game publisher Korea Boardgames for October 2022 when they plan to present the game at the SPIEL '22 convention.

== Gameplay ==
Over seven rounds, players use the cards in their hands to hire various artists, scientists and architects. Each profession has a set of preferences and requirements that players have to fulfill and awards work points that can be converted into money or victory points. Money can be used to acquire buildings or landscape features in auctions to be able to better match the requirements of different professionals. Whoever has the most victory points by the end of round seven wins the game. An interesting strategic element is that whenever new buildings are placed in the player's villa, they may not touch other buildings, unless certain conditions are achieved first. This leads to not always being able to purchase the most advantageous buildings if they be fitted into the playing area.

== Awards and rankings ==
- Winner, Meeples' Choice Award 2000
- Winner, International Gamers Award 2001
- Winner, Nederlandse Spellenprijs 2007
- Winner, Lucca Game - Best Game Mechanics 2007
- Winner, Tric Trac d'Or 2007
- Winner, Ludoteca Ideale Official Selection 2008
- Winner, As d'Or - Jeu de l'Année Prix Spécial du Jury 2008
- 4th Place, Deutscher Spiele Preis, 2000
- Ranked #8 on BoardGameGeek (as of March 2008)
- Nominee, MinD-Spielepreis 2010
