= Blue Moon (game) =

Collectible card game

Blue Moon is a German expandable card game (ECG) designed by Reiner Knizia and published by Kosmos and Fantasy Flight Games in 2004.

== Genre ==
Blue Moon is a fantasy-style card game with a total of 344 cards and designed for two players. Fantasy Flight Games has classified Blue Moon within the Living Card Games (LCG) genre. This classification distinguishes it from randomized card assortments prevalent in chance-dependent card collections found in other collectible card games such as 7th Sea or Magic: The Gathering.

== Gameplay ==
The game is played by replicating the challenges various characters face within the fictional realm of Blue Moon. Each character has distinct attributes and mechanics within a 30-card deck, out of 344 cards, accompanied by a designated "leader" card.

The Blue Moon game box contains a compact game board and three plastic dragon tokens, used as markers for scoring purposes throughout gameplay. The core box includes two decks: one featuring the Vulca characters and the other highlighting the Hoax characters. The dimensions of the Blue Moon cards measure 120 mm × 70 mm, similar to the size of Tarot cards.

Players can further enhance their experience by buying expansion decks. These comprise 30 to 31 cards and introduce additional gameplay elements and strategies to the game.

The aim of the game is to "attract" the dragons by playing character cards in turn trying to obtain a total value in one of the two resources of the game (earth and fire) higher than the one played by the rival player. Once a player attracted all three of the dragons they are declared winner.

Stewart Woods, in his 2012 book Eurogames: The design, culture and play of modern European board games, noted that Blue Moon was categorized, in the terms used by game scholar Aki Järvinen, as a game closely related to those with no table-based environmental components, using the card placement in Blue Moon as an example of utilising "abstracted boards in order to assist in play of the game either through visual indicators of key mechanics or as a reference for the consistent positioning of other elements."

== Components ==
The original 2004 base box of the game contains:

- 2 sets of people (the Vulca and the Hoax)
- 60 cards
- 2 leaders
- 3 dragons
- 1 game board
- 2 overview cards
- Instructions

The selection of individual characters available includes:

- Mimix
- Flit
- Khind
- Terrah
- Pillar
- Aqua
- Buka (Buka Invasion)

In addition to the core pair of included decks are two supplementary decks, "Emissaries & Inquisitors: Allies" and "Emissaries & Inquisitors: Blessings". These decks encompass additional cards designed for versatile utility. The augmented rules integrated into the foundational set afford players an expanded spectrum of options for customizing their decks. Each of these decks is centered around an individual character, and constructing these decks is constrained by the inclusion of cards from other characters, which is quantified by the metric known as "moons."

A significant portion of Blue Moon cards comprise textual components that explain their impact on the game, sometimes superseding established game rules, emphasizing the crucial significance of language and interpretation within the game context. Other iterations have been produced, with language changes adding English (published by Fantasy Flight Games), German (published by Kosmos), Dutch (published by 999 Games, excluding the Buka Invasion), French (published by Tilsit, though incomplete), and Japanese (published by Hobby Japan). In addition, select promotional cards have been dispensed as tokens of appreciation upon reaching specific milestones at assorted gaming events.

== Publication history ==
Blue Moon was created by Reiner Knizia and published in Germany in 2004 by Kosmos. An English version was published by Fantasy Flight Games. However, as game historian Shannon Appelcline noted in the 2014 book Designers & Dragons: The 90s, CCGs were "a dwindling part of FFG's board game production."

In 2006, Fantasy Flight Games released a Blue Moon-related board game named Blue Moon City. While it is incompatible with the Blue Moon card game, it was a complete German-style board game for 2 to 4 players and set in the same fictional world of Blue Moon.

A new version of the game titled Blue Moon Legends has been published by Fantasy Flight Games in 2014. It contains every card ever published for Blue Moon in a single package.

=== Illustrators ===
- John Matson – Vulca
- Franz Vohwinkel – Hoax and Mutants (also the dragon designer)
- Todd Lockwood – Mimix
- Jim Nelson – Flit
- Scott M. Fischer – Khind
- Daren Bader – Terrah
- Michael Phillippi – Pillar
- Randy Gallegos – Hyla
- Lars Grant-West – Aqua
- Jeremy Jarvis – Interference Cards

== Reception ==
In Issue 51 of the French games magazine Backstab, Olivier Guillo thought that in a world awash with CCGs, "It is through subtle development of certain things that Blue Moon stands out from the others: first of all with a good quality basic box [...] and superb larger-than-standard-sized cards." Although Guillo pointed out that the basic packs are limited to only two factions, more factions are found in the expansions, and he admitted, "I am rapidly tempted to buy these expansions." Guillo concluded by giving the game an average rating of 3 out of 5, calling it "A game that has everything to interest fans of the genre and those who don't yet know it."

Writing in the Slovenian magazine Joker, David Tomšič noted that "Gameplay is fast-paced and consists of back-to-back fights that decide the winner of the battle." Tomšič warned that each faction in the game "requires a different tactic, and they are nicely balanced, but it is true that some are more challenging [...] Beginners won't have a problem, but it's only through repeated play that deeper tactics are revealed. When you gain experience, combat is no longer dependent on luck." Tomšič noted that the game had good replayability but commented "It's just a shame that when you buy several expansions, it becomes quite expensive."

== Other reviews and commentary ==
- Pyramid
- Board Game Reviews by Josh - Blue Moon City Review
