= Beowulf: The Legend =

Board game

- The box cover of Beowulf
- Designers: Reiner Knizia
- Publishers: Fantasy Flight Games; Kosmos; Sophisticated Games
- Publication: 2005
- Players: 2 to 5
- Playing time: 1 hour
- Age range: 12 and up

Beowulf: The Legend is a 2005 designer board game by Reiner Knizia. The artwork is by John Howe. Game play uses cards and tokens. The play moves along a board, and players obtain gold and cards in order to eventually obtain victory points.

The game is based on the events described in the epic poem Beowulf. The players represent Beowulf's men, seeking to support him in his adventures, and succeed him after his death.

The game mechanics of Beowulf include resource management and a "press your luck" component, where potential risk is balanced against potential reward. There are also three types of auctions in the game: two types of open turn-based continuous bidding auctions (one where everyone pays and one where the winner pays), as well as one closed bid auction where everyone pays.
