= Taj Mahal (board game) =

Board game

- Box cover of Taj Mahal
- Designers: Reiner Knizia
- Publishers: Alea; Rio Grande Games
- Publication: 2000
- Players: 3–5
- Playing time: 1 hour and 30 minutes
- Age range: 12 +

Taj Mahal is a German-style board game for 3–5 players designed by Reiner Knizia and first published in 2000 by Alea in German.

== Rules ==
=== Basics ===
During 12 rounds, players bid with cards on up to six different prizes each turn. Those prizes earn points in themselves, but players can also get points for connecting provinces on the map. After the twelfth round, the player with the highest point total wins the game.

=== Auctions ===
During the auction phase of the game, players take turns playing cards from their hands to increase the amount of their bid. A player may choose to withdraw instead of increasing their bid, in which case they immediately collect any awards they have earned for that round, and are removed from the auction. The round ends after all players have withdrawn from the auction.
