= Celtis (disambiguation) =

Celtis is a genus of trees.

Celtis or similarly spelt words may refer to:

- Celtis, Missouri, a town in the United States of America
- Claas Celtis, a tractor made by CLAAS
- Conrad Celtes, a German Renaissance scholar
- Keltis, a board game
