= Through the Desert =

Board game designee by Reiner Knizia

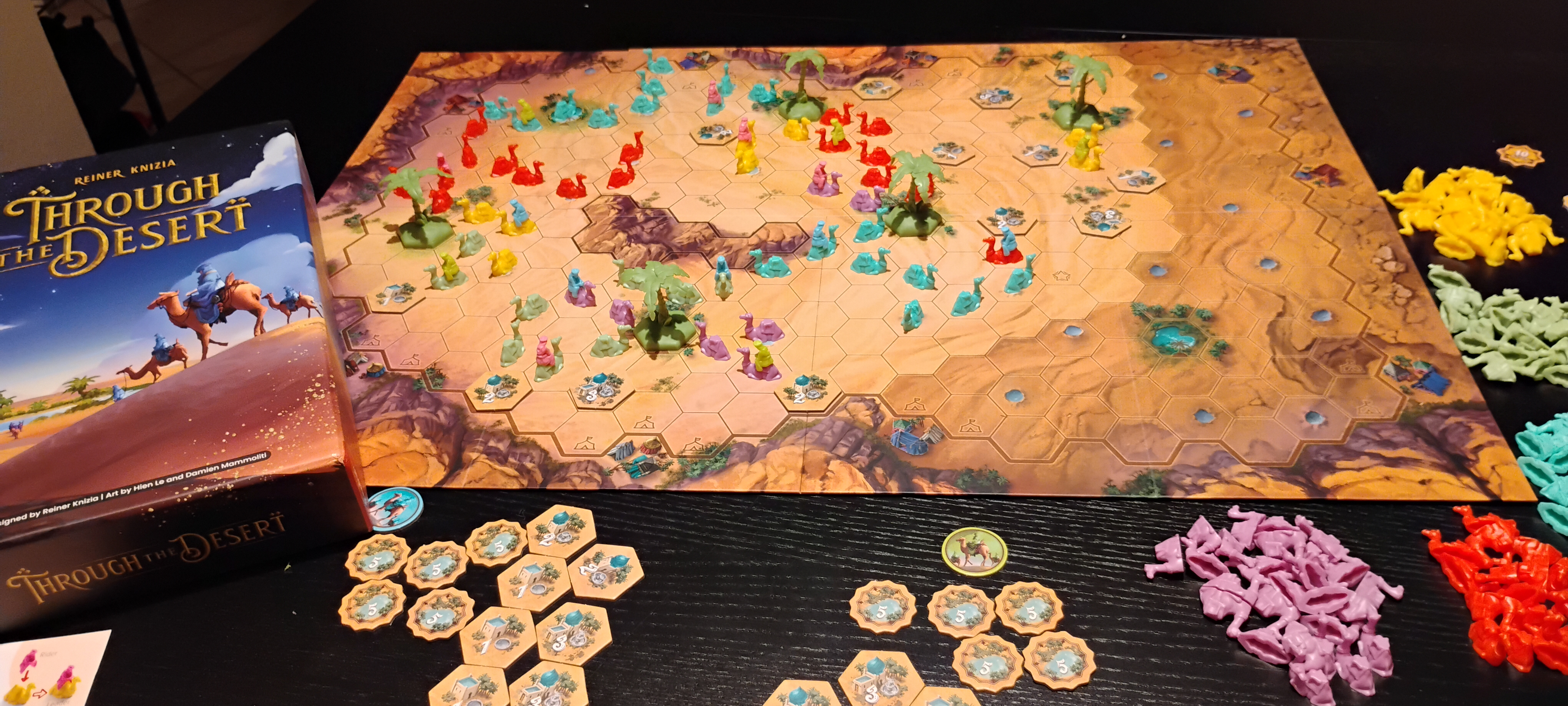
- The Allplay version of Through the Desert
- Designers: Reiner Knizia
- Publishers: Kosmos (German); Fantasy Flight Games (English)
- Players: 2-5
- Setup time: Approximately 5 minutes
- Playing time: 20-45 minutes
- Chance: None
- Age range: 10+
- Skills: Tile placement, Area enclosure

Through the Desert (German: Durch die Wüste) is a German-style board game designed by Reiner Knizia. It was originally released in 1998 by German game publisher, Kosmos, under the name Durch die Wüste. Players place pastel colored plastic camels on a hexagon-based board in an attempt to score points by capturing watering holes and reaching oases.

== Gameplay ==
Before the game starts, the board is seeded with watering holes and oases. Each player then places one camel in each of the five colors with a caravan leader of their color on the board.

On a player's turn, he places two additional camels of any color on the board. A camel must be played adjacent to a camel of the same color and that group of camels must include the player's caravan leader. A player may never combine two different groups of the same colored camels.

During the game, players score points by placing a camel on top of a watering hole or playing a camel adjacent to an oasis. At the end of the game, players score points for the longest caravan (most camels) of each color and for areas that have been enclosed by one of their caravans.

The game ends when the supply of camels for any one color has been exhausted. The player with the most points wins.

== Awards ==
- Nominee - 1998 Spiel des Jahres award

== Reviews ==
- Pyramid
- Rebel Times #7
