= Keltis =

Board game by Reiner Knizia

- German box cover
- Designers: Reiner Knizia
- Publishers: Kosmos; Rio Grande Games
- Publication: 2008
- Players: 2-4
- Setup time: 2 minutes
- Playing time: 30 minutes
- Chance: Medium
- Age range: 10 and up
- Skills: Strategic thought

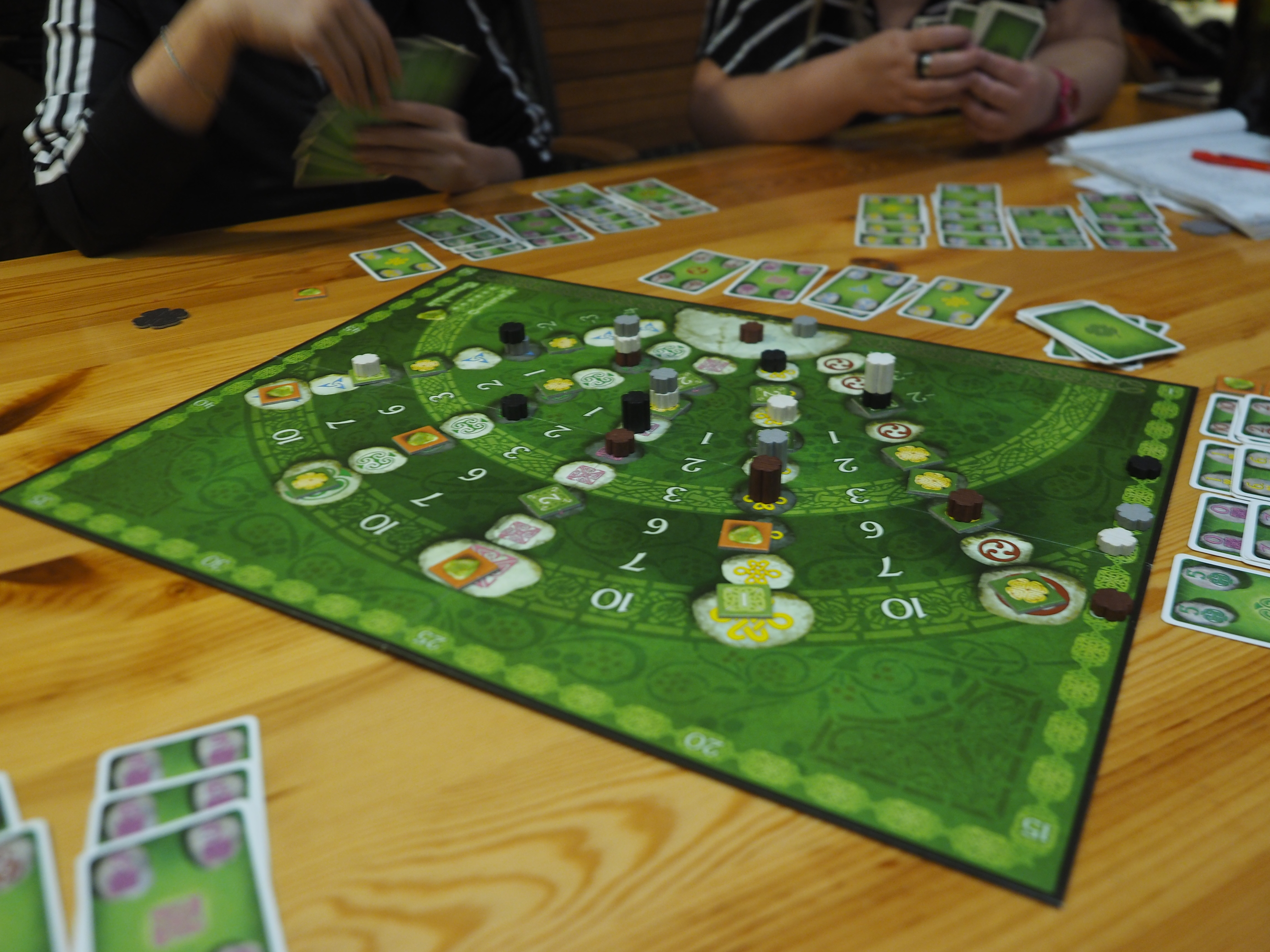
A four-player game of Keltis during play.

Keltis is a board game designed by Reiner Knizia that won the Spiel des Jahres for best game of the year in 2008. In the US, it has been marketed as Lost Cities: The Board Game, though there are some subtle rules differences.

It is a multi-player board game that is based on the same theme as Knizia's two-player card game Lost Cities.

Players score points by playing cards, which must be played in ascending or descending order. Each turn, a card is played which advances the player's token along a stone path. Playing only 1 to 3 cards in a color results in negative points for that color. Each card played improves a player's score, and when at least 4 cards of one color have been played, positive points are scored for that path. Each player records progress using tokens. One token is taller, and points it collects are doubled.

Extra points are gained by collecting stones or landing on bonus squares during the game.

The game ends either when five of the players' tokens have entered the "goal area" consisting of the last three ranks on the board, or when the deck runs out. At this point, the players' scores are tallied, and the player with the most points wins.
