= Lord of the Rings (board game) =

Game designed by Reiner Knizia

- Designers: Reiner Knizia
- Publishers: Kosmos; Hasbro; Fantasy Flight Games; 999 Games
- Publication: 2000
- Players: 2–5
- Setup time: 5 minutes
- Playing time: 45–75 minutes
- Chance: Medium (Cards, Dice)
- Skills: Cooperation

Lord of the Rings is a cooperative board game based on the high fantasy novel The Lord of the Rings by J. R. R. Tolkien. Published in 2000 by Kosmos in Germany, Wizards of the Coast in the U.S., and Parker Brothers in the U.K., the game is designed by Reiner Knizia and features artwork by illustrator John Howe. In the game, each player plays a hobbit in the party, and the party will aim to destroy the One Ring. Upon its release, the game received a Spiel des Jahres special award. A slightly revised version was later published by Fantasy Flight Games.

== Game play ==
Game play is centered on advancement through a series of scenarios corresponding to the adventures of the books. Players turn tiles and play cards in order to move forward, and collect and spend tokens to avoid advancement toward the Dark Lord Sauron. In dire situations, tokens may be spent to call for the assistance of Gandalf, or the One Ring may be used to speed advancement at the cost of moving closer toward Sauron. On the master board there are three locations: Bag End, Rivendell, and Lothlórien. The game starts at Bag End and each player draws a card identifying the player's Hobbit character, each of which has a special ability. Each player is dealt cards that allow him to complete four different activities: traveling, hiding, friendship or fighting. One hobbit is initially assigned to be the "ring bearer", but a new hobbit may become the ring bearer after each scenario is completed. The journey through the game calls for jumping back and forth between the main board and the other four boards. Players advance through locations such as Rivendell, Lothlórien, Moria, Helm's Deep, Shelob's Lair, and Mordor; all while trying to stay away from the dark lord Sauron. Players are eliminated if they are on the same space as Sauron or are behind him. The game concludes when the fellowship reaches Mount Doom and destroys the Ring, the ring bearer is eliminated, or if the Fellowship reaches Mount Doom yet all players are eliminated before the Ring is destroyed. Players need to cooperate and work together in order to beat this game. Players must display strategy and have a little luck. Knowledge of The Lord of the Rings plot isn’t needed to play the game, yet might help in some situations.

== Expansion packs ==
Multiple expansions currently were published. The Friends & Foes (2001) expansion added scenario boards for Bree and Isengard, a deck with 30 foes (such as barrow-wights and wargs), and enabled players to assume the role of Strider, Saruman, or the Mirkwood spiders.

The Sauron expansion was released in 2002, and the Battlefields was released in 2007. The Sauron expansion enabled one player to take the role of Sauron and play against all others. The Battlefields expansion added six additional battlefields and five more members of the Fellowship.

== Special editions ==
In 2001, the game was also released as a "Limited Edition" version, limited to 750 copies. The set features a box signed by game designer Knizia and illustrator Howe, as well as an art print limited created and signed by Howe. It also included pewter Hobbit character pieces and a 22-kt. gold One Ring.

In 2020, an "Anniversary Edition" (LTR20) was released for the game's 20th anniversary. This edition includes the "design elements from the previous edition, and comes with a set of newly sculptured miniatures, markers, tokens, and dice".

== Reception ==
Teeuwynn Woodruff comments: "Where Reiner Knizia's Lord of the Rings board game delivers brilliantly is in conveying this all-important feeling of fellowship through every aspect of its design. In order to beat the game, players must talk to each other, work together, and one or more Hobbits may have to sacrifice themselves so that the Ring-bearer can get to Mount Doom and destroy his dangerous burden. When your group manages to achieve this lofty goal, it's a victory for all. In this, players get to realize, to some degree, the same sense of community that Frodo, Sam, and rest of the Fellowship feels in Middle Earth as they struggle against an overwhelming force, one far more powerful than any of the individuals opposing it. Their incredible strength comes from their unity, and Reiner Knizia's Lord of the Rings board game reflects that truth beautifully." Following its release, the game also won a Spiel des Jahres special award for best use of literature in a game and in 2004 it won the Games Magazine Games 100 Honor in the Family Strategy category.

== Reviews ==
- Envoyer #52
- Family Games: The 100 Best
