= Mississippi Queen (board game) =

Board race game for 3–5 players

- Box cover of German edition
- Designers: Werner Hodel
- Publishers: Goldsieber; Rio Grande Games
- Players: 3 to 5
- Playing time: 45 minutes
- Age range: 10 and up

Mississippi Queen is a German board game published by Goldsieber Spiele in 1997 that simulates a paddlewheel race down the Mississippi River in 1871. The game was also published in English by Rio Grande Games, and won several awards including the Spiel des Jahres.

== Description ==
Mississippi Queen is a game for 3–5 players in which each is a paddlewheeler captain involved in a race to New Orleans.

=== Components ===
- Five plastic steamboats with a numbered red paddlewheel (speed indicator) and a numbered black paddlewheel (coal indicator).
- 12 hex grid river tiles (one being a start tile)
- 16 passenger tokens
- 1 special die (straight ahead, turn left, turn right)
- 11 page rule booklet

=== Setup ===
Each player is given a paddlewheeler, which is placed on the start tile (the ship of the youngest player in space #1, then moving clockwise around the table.) The speed of all boats is set to 1 and the coal is set to 6. The initial river tile is placed in the center of the table, and the other 11 tiles are shuffled and placed face down.

=== Gameplay ===
==== Movement ====
The red wheel on each boat indicates its current speed, which starts at 1, the speed of the Mississippi current. At the start of their turn, a player can increase or decrease their speed by 1 for free. The player can also choose to speed up or slow down more than 1 for a cost of one coal for each increase or decrease of 1 above the free increment. So increasing from 1 to 2 is free, increasing from 1 to 3 would cost 1 coal. Once the player has chosen the speed, the boat must be moved that many hexes. The chosen speed carries over into the next turn.

In order to maneuver around river bends, the first 60-degree change of direction in a player's turn (1 hex face) is free. Each extra 60-degree change costs 1 coal.

==== Picking up passengers ====
At certain points along the river, passengers will be waiting to be picked up. A boat has to slow to a speed of 1 in order to pick up a passenger.

==== New river tiles ====
When a boat reaches the last hex of a river tile, the owning player turns over the next river tile and rolls the special die, which will indicate if the new river tile turns to the left, the right or continues straight ahead. Once the new river tile is in place, the active player continues their turn.

==== Ramming ====
A ship approaching from behind can ram into a ship (or a line of ships). The ramming ship loses 1 point of movement for each ship that was hit. Each ship that was hit is moved into an adjacent water hex, possibly causing issues for the owning player on their next turn.

==== Running aground ====
If a ship runs out of coal and is not able to either slow down or turn enough to prevent running aground on an island or the river bank, then the owning player is out of the game.

=== Victory conditions ===
The first ship to safely enter the wharf at the end of the river with a speed of 1 and carrying two passengers is the winner. The ship does not have to have any coal left in order to win.

== Publication history ==
Mississippi Queen was created by independent German game designer Werner Hodel, and was published by Goldsieber Spiele in 1997 with artwork by Franz Vohwinkel. Rio Grande Games published an English version for the North American market the following year. This was Hodel's first and only major design success.

Goldsieber followed up with a sequel in 1998, The Black Rose, in which a sixth ship was added to the game, as well as new river tiles with dangerous spots and coal depots.

In 2019, French publisher Super Meeple republished both the base game and the expansion as one game.

In his book Eurogames: The Design, Culture and Play of Modern European Board Games, Stewart Woods noted during the late 1990s, Mississippi Queen and other award-winning German board games "continued to push the boundaries of game systems and mechanics", reinvigorating board game design in Europe and re-energizing to the North American games market.

== Reception ==
The reviewer from the online second volume of Pyramid stated that "Based on paddle wheel ship racing in the late 1800s, the game is a fast playing and simple to learn the game for the entire family. And not in a bad way."

Twenty-five years after its publication, Jochen Corts called Mississippi Queen "A game that is also accessible to casual gamers right away and can be mastered equally quickly in the family circle of young and old alike." He noted that the game is well balanced between skill and luck, commenting, "While clever driving maneuvers and tactical skill characterize the fight for the lead, the fact that the next section of the river and its orientation is determined by rolling the dice ensures a balancing element of chance."

The game is generally well received with 6.8/10 rating from 419 reviews on Board Game Geek.

== Awards ==
- Spiel des Jahres 1997. The jury praised the theme as well as a combination of luck and tactics but criticized the assembly of some components as "a bit fiddly".
- Hippodice Autorennettbewerb 1997 (called a "highly regarded award" by Stewart Woods)
