= Reiner Knizia =

German board game designer

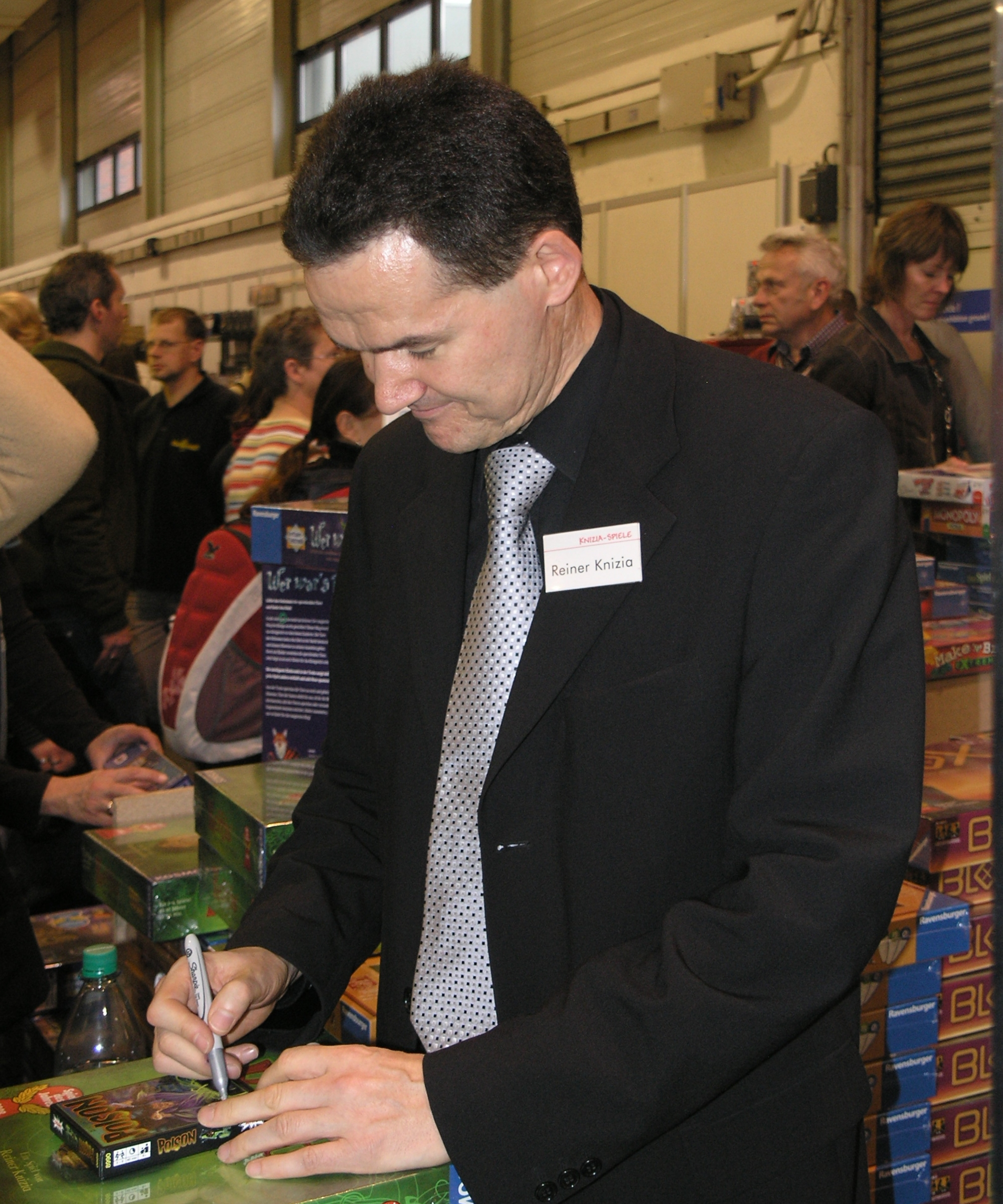
- Knizia at Essen 2008
- Born: 16 November 1957 (age 69); Illertissen, Bavaria, West Germany
- Education: Syracuse University (MA); University of Ulm (PhD)
- Known for: Game designer
- Notable work: High Society; Ra; Ingenious

Reiner Knizia (German pronunciation: [ˈʁaɪnɐ ˈknɪtsi̯a]; born 16 November 1957) is a German-style board game designer. He was born in West Germany and earned a doctorate in mathematics from the University of Ulm before designing games full-time. He is frequently included on lists of the greatest game designers of all time.

Many of his hundreds of designs are considered modern classics, and many have won or been nominated for significant gaming awards, including the Spiel des Jahres and the Deutscher Spiele Preis. His notable designs include Amun-Re, Blue Moon City, Ingenious, Keltis, Lord of the Rings, Medici, Modern Art, Ra, Taj Mahal, Tigris and Euphrates, and Through the Desert. Many of his designs incorporate mathematical principles, such as his repeated use of auction mechanics.

== Early life and education ==
Knizia was born in Illertissen, West Germany, in 1957. During his childhood, the small town of Illertissen offered only limited access to boardgames (the only place that sold games was the local barbershop, which had a limited selection). He played Monopoly, which had an impact mainly because the paper money allowed other forms of creativity, such as game design. Because of the limited selection of games in his hometown, at age 8 or 9 he began designing games of his own based on themes he found interesting, such as racing and castles, to play with friends. In one childhood design, a board used a fantasy map of spaces on which knights moved to attack pieces of the other player and occupy their castle. As a teenager, he developed an international-themed wargame, and in his twenties he self-published a play-by-mail magazine where readers would send moves which would be announced in new issues.

He later gained a Master of Science degree from Syracuse University in the United States and a doctorate in Mathematics from the University of Ulm in Germany. He went on to manage a two-billion-dollar mortgage services company in the United Kingdom, from which he was able to retire at age 40. He published many magazine-based games while writing for Spielbox (a German games magazine), and began having success publishing boxed games in the 1990s, with two games themed around digging for gold. Goldrausch was centered around the California Gold Rush, and Digging was themed about avoiding bandits while mining for gold.

== Career ==
Knizia has been a full-time game designer since 1997, when he quit his job from the board of a large international bank. Knizia has been living in England since 1993.

In addition to having designed over 700 published games, Knizia is highly acclaimed as a designer, having won the Deutscher Spiele Preis four times, a Spiel des Jahres (in addition to a Kinderspiel des Jahres, a Kennerspiel des Jahres, and a special award), and numerous other national and international awards. At the Origins Game Fair in 2002 he was inducted into the Gaming Hall of Fame. His games frequently make appearances on various "top games" lists, including the GAMES 100 list, the BoardGameGeek top 100, and the Internet Top 100 Games List. Several gaming conventions host "Kniziathons", which are tournaments dedicated to celebrating Knizia-designed games.

Reiner Knizia started developing games for his play-by-mail game zine Postspillion, founded in 1985. The zine still exists, and the game Bretton Woods (also a Reiner Knizia design), which was started in 1987, is still going.

One of Knizia's best selling games is Lord of the Rings, published in 17 languages with over one million copies sold. His dice game Pickomino has also reached 1 million copies sold and his Keltis sold over 600,000 copies. His game Ingenious has been published in over 20 languages. In 2011, Knizia designed a Star Trek-themed game for NECA/WizKids, based on the 2009 film that 'reset' the Star Trek universe. In 2015 Ravensburger released Star Wars VII - Galaxy Rebellion based on the popular movie franchise.

A number of Knizia designs have been redeveloped for the electronic gaming & console markets. Ingenious (aka Einfach Genial) and Keltis have both appeared in CD-ROM versions; Lost Cities was adapted for Xbox 360 via Xbox Live Arcade. An original game for the Nintendo DS, Dr. Reiner Knizia's Brainbenders was published in 2008; Keltis for the NDS followed in 2009. Other mobile implementations of Knizia titles include Lost Cities, Battle Line, Kingdoms, Medici, Ra, Through the Desert, Samurai and Tigris and Euphrates. Knizia has also designed various game applications specifically for the iPhone, including Robot Master, Dice Monster, Labyrinth and Pipes.

Over several years Knizia has developed a number of hybrid boardgames with electronic components, most notably with German publisher Ravensburger. The first of these was the King Arthur adventure game in 2003, later updated for use with the iPhone in 2014. Other titles include Die Insel, the award-winning Wer War's?, Der Drei ??? and in 2015 Captain Black (notable for a talking ghost pirate captain and a 90 cm – 3 foot – 3D ship).

== Game characteristics ==
Knizia's games cover many board game genres. He has designed small two-player card games, children's games, and even a live-action roleplaying game.

One element of modern game design that Reiner Knizia has pioneered is abstract theme. Older themed games like Monopoly have traditionally developed their themes by trying to model or emulate the environment or situation they are thematically tied to. So Monopoly has players buying and developing properties as a real estate developer might. Knizia's thematic game designs tend not to try to model a specific environment, but instead try to invoke the thought and decision-making processes that are key to the theme. For example, Knizia's game Medici has a fairly abstract game system of drawing and buying cards that does not try to model any particular environment, but in the game-world, the players are always attempting to price risk, the key success factor in the investment banking business in which the Medicis made their fortune. A further example of this can be found in Knizia's game, Tigris and Euphrates. The players each take control of one of four different dynasties of Mesopotamia around 3,000 B.C. Each dynasty has priests, farmers, traders, and kings who are placed strategically on the board. The players take turns expanding their dynasties, building temples, and attacking the other players' dynasties. Instead of Tigris and Euphrates having many complicated rules, the game is relatively simple and has very streamlined rules that does not attempt to emulate the real-life conflicts but rather abstracts this out, allowing for the players to focus on strategic decision making. This approach has allowed Knizia to develop games that are comparatively simple but require thoughtful game-play, while still retaining strongly thematic elements.

Using his understanding of principles in mathematics to full effect, pricing and evaluating risk are frequently recurring elements in Reiner Knizia games. Many of his most successful designs use auctions as a vehicle to price risk, as in Ra, Medici, and Modern Art.

== Games ==
Knizia claims to have designed more than 900 games.

Some of Knizia's games are:

- Abandon Ship
- Age of War/Risk Express
- Amun-Re
  - Winner, Deutscher Spiele Preis 2003
  - Nominee, International Gamers Awards—General Strategy; Multiplayer
- Amphipolis
- Auf Heller und Pfennig (released in English as Kingdoms)
  - Winner, Origins Award for Best Abstract Board Game of 2002
- Battle Line (released as Schotten-Totten in Germany)
- Beowulf: The Legend
- Blue Moon/Blue Moon Legends
- Blue Moon City
  - Nominee, Spiel des Jahres 2006
- Carcassonne: The Castle
  - Recommended, Spiel des Jahres 2004
- Clickbait (released by Big Potato Games)
- Drahtseilakt (released as Tightrope and Relationship Tightrope in the US)
- Dream Factory (released as Traumfabrik in Germany and Hollywood Blockbuster)
  - Winner, Arets Spel for Best Adult Game
- Einfach Genial (released as Ingenious in the US and Mensa Connections in the UK)
  - Nominee, Spiel des Jahres 2004
  - Winner, Schweizer Spielepreis Best Strategy Game 2004
- High Society (card game)
- Indigo (board game)
- Ivanhoe
- Keltis
  - Winner, Spiel des Jahres 2008
- LEGO Ramses Pyramid
- L.L.A.M.A.
  - Nominee, Spiel des Jahres 2019
- Loot
- Looting London (card game)
- Lord of the Rings
  - Winner, Spiel des Jahres 2001 special prize for best use of literature in a game
- Lord of the Rings: The Confrontation
- Lost Cities
  - Winner, International Gamers Award 2000 for Best 2-player strategy game
- Medici
  - Recommended, Spiel des Jahres 1995
- Modern Art
  - Winner, Deutscher Spiele Preis 1993
  - Winner, Finnish Game of the Year 2008
  - Recommended, Spiel des Jahres 1993
- My City (board game)
  - Nominee, Spiel des Jahres 2020
- My Word!
- Orongo
- Pickomino/Heckmeck
- Prosperity
  - Co-designed with Sebastian Bleasdale
- Qin (board game)
- Quo Vadis? (rereleased as Zoo Vadis)
  - Recommended, Spiel des Jahres 1992
- Ra
  - Nominee, 2000 International Gamers Awards—General Strategy; Multi-player
- Rebirth
  - Winner, Kennerspiel des Jahres 2026
- Ribbit
- Samurai
- (Do You Know) Shakespeare?
- Star Trek: Expeditions
- Star Wars VII - Galaxy Rebellion
- Taj Mahal
  - Winner, Deutscher Spiele Preis 2000
  - Winner, Essen Feather 2000
- Through the Desert
  - Recommended, Spiel des Jahres 1998
- Tigris and Euphrates
  - Winner, Deutscher Spiele Preis 1998 for Best Family/Adult Game
  - Recommended, Spiel des Jahres 1998
- Tower of Babel
  - Winner, Schweizer Spielepreis best strategy game 2005
- Vampire
- Wer war's/Who Was It?
  - Winner, Kinderspiel des Jahres 2008
  - Winner, Deutscher Kinderspiele Preis 2008
- Wettlauf nach El Dorado/The Quest for El Dorado
  - Nominee, Spiel des Jahres 2017
- Winner's Circle (board game)
  - Recommended, Spiel des Jahres 2001

== See also ==
- Going Cardboard (documentary including an interview with Knizia)
