= Ingenious (board game) =

Abstract strategy board game by Reiner Knizia

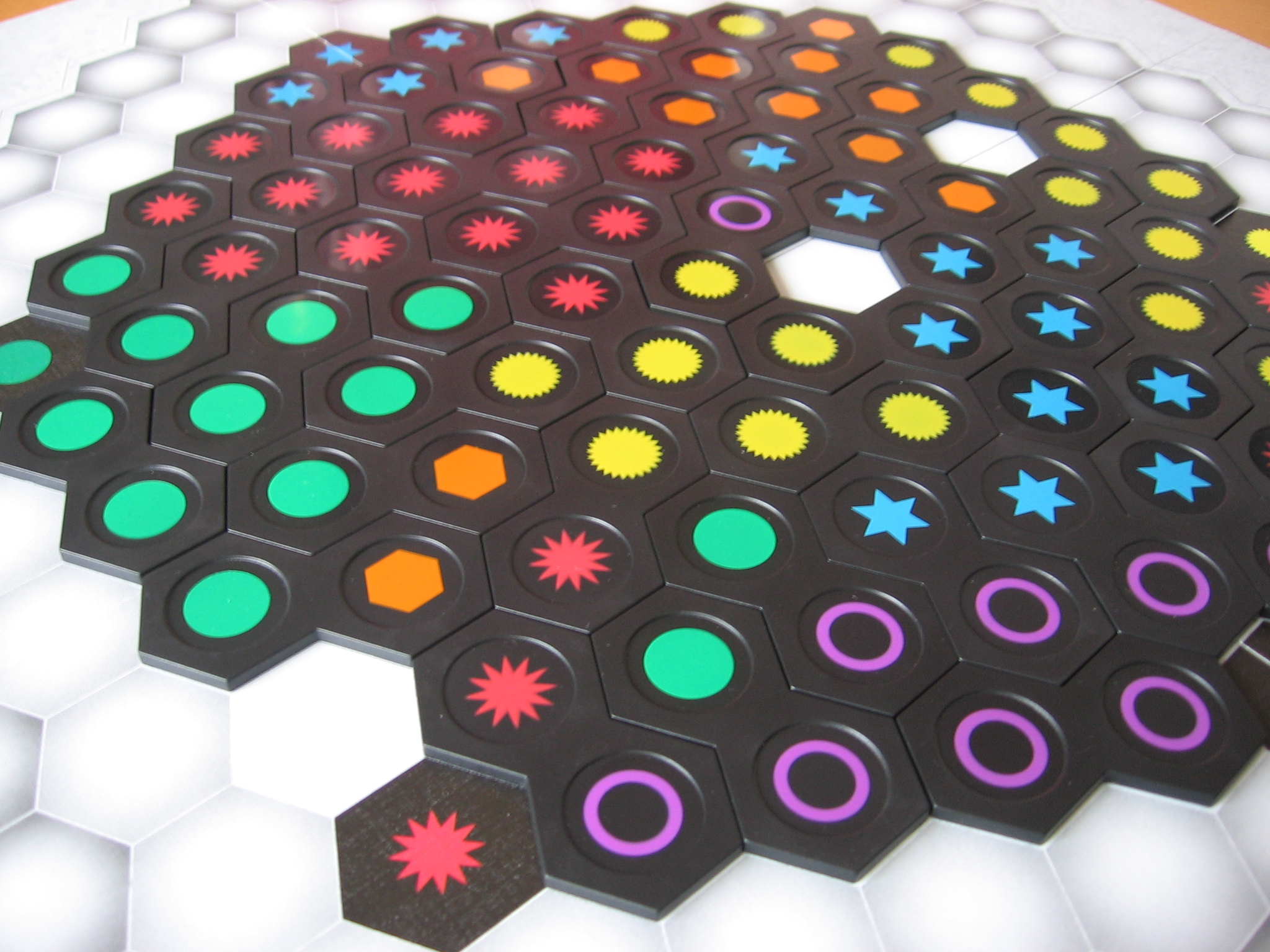
- A game in play
- Designers: Reiner Knizia
- Publishers: Fantasy Flight Games; Kosmos; Sophisticated Games
- Publication: 2004
- Players: 1-4
- Setup time: 1 minute
- Playing time: 45 minutes
- Chance: Medium
- Age range: 10 and up
- Skills: Strategic thought

Ingenious is the English name for Einfach Genial (Simply Ingenious), a German abstract strategy board game designed by Reiner Knizia under commission from Sophisticated Games and published in 2004 by Kosmos. Across most of Europe it is titled as the local translation of Ingenious or Simply Ingenious, the notable exception being Mensa Connections in the UK.

== Components ==
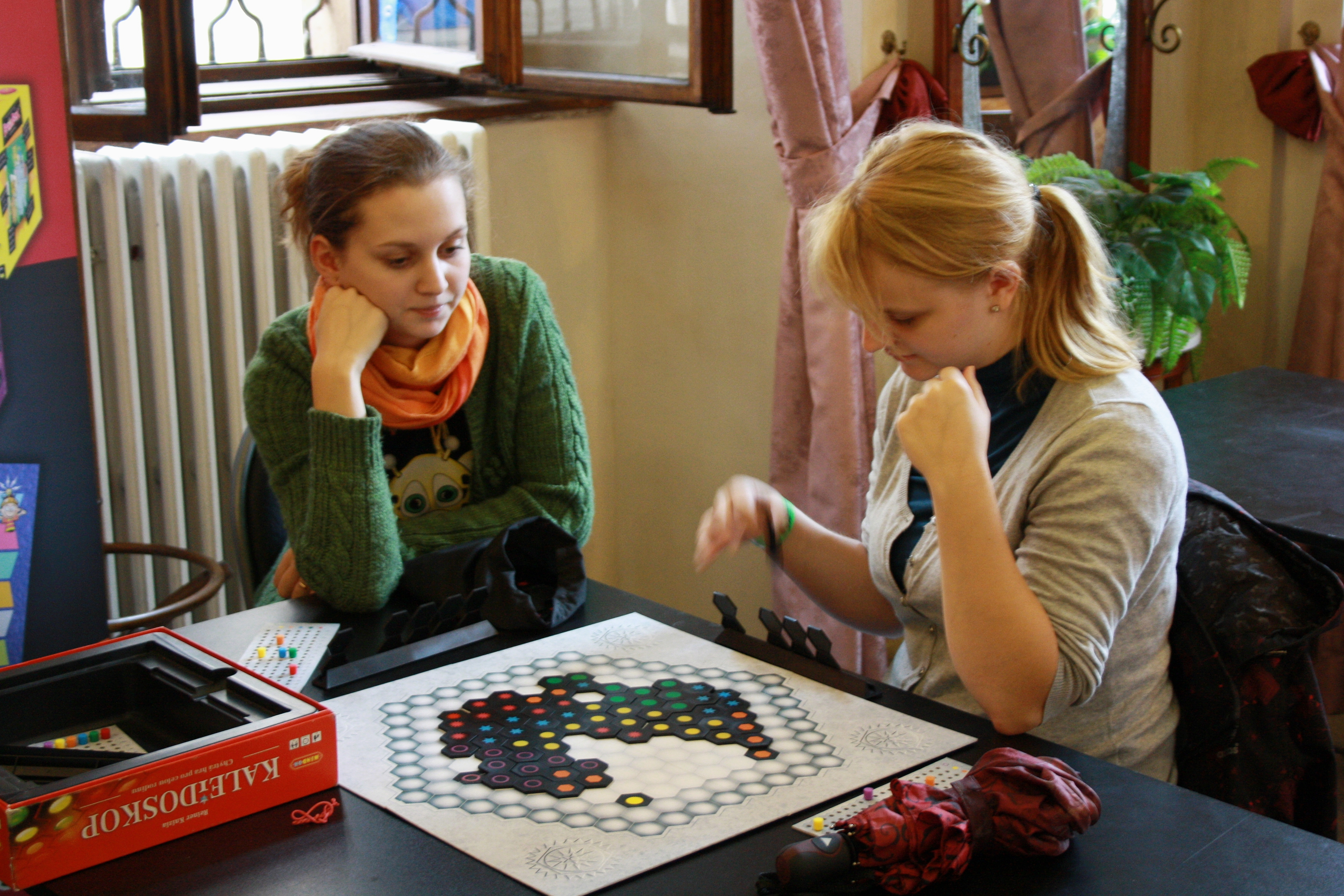
Kaleidoskop

- 1 game board
- 4 tile racks
- 4 cardboard scoring boards
- 24 wooden scoring blocks
- 120 tiles
- 1 rule sheet

With the exception of the game box and rule sheet (which require regional translations), identical components are used in each version of the game.

=== Tile distribution ===
There are six coloured symbols used in the game:

- red 12-pointed star
- green circle
- blue 6-pointed star
- orange hexagon
- yellow 24-pointed star
- purple ring

Tiles are in the shape of two conjoined hexagons, with one of the coloured symbols in each hexagon. There are six tiles for each two-colour combination (e.g. red/orange) and five for each double (e.g. blue/blue). The combination of colours and symbols aids visually impaired players.

== Rules ==
=== Basics ===
The game can be played by two, three or four players, with additional rules provided for solo and four-player partnership play. Each player has a rack of six randomly chosen tiles which are concealed from the other players. The board is also made up of a number of hexagons, with the two outermost rings reserved for three- and four-player games respectively. The rules state that the youngest player takes the first turn, although where multiple games are played it is common practice for the first turn to rotate clockwise around the board in subsequent games.

=== Tile placement ===
Players take turns placing a tile on the board, scoring points by creating lines of identically colored hexes. On the first turn, each player must place a tile next to a different one of the six printed colored symbols on the board; thereafter players may place tiles on any free space.

=== Scoring ===
A player can score points in each of the six colors, tracked separately. For instance, a player's score may consist of four red points, seven orange points, one yellow point, etc.

When a tile is placed, scoring occurs from each of the two symbols on the tile. Counting outwards in a straight line from each of the five available faces of the two hexagons (the symbols on the tile itself are not counted), one point is scored in that hexagon's color for each identical symbol in an unbroken line. It is therefore possible to score points on two colors by placing a single tile.

Each player's score is public knowledge at all times.

=== Bonus play ===
If a player reaches a score of 18 with any colour, they declare 'Ingenious', 'Genial' or 'Mensa' (depending on which language version they are playing) and place a further tile. Achieving a score of 18 on two colours at the same time will earn two bonus plays, and bonus plays may earn further bonus plays by reaching 18 points on another colour. Once a player has used their bonus play for any colour, they will not score additional points or earn further bonus plays on that particular colour. All bonus plays are made from the player's current rack of tiles. Bonus plays must be used immediately.

=== Swapping tiles ===
Once a player has made their move(s) and scored accordingly, they may choose to swap their tiles if they hold no tiles of their current lowest-scoring colour (or where their lowest score is tied, if they hold no tiles of any of their joint lowest colours). Their remaining tiles are shown to the other players, a full hand of six tiles is drawn, and the discarded ones replaced in the bag.

=== Refreshing ===
If the player holds five or fewer tiles, they refresh their hand by drawing enough tiles to bring them back up to a full hand of six. This is the end of that player's turn.

=== Victory conditions ===
Any player scoring 18 on all six colours wins immediately. Otherwise, the game ends when no more pieces can be added to the board, at which time players check the colour in which they have the fewest points. Whoever has the highest point value in their weakest colour is the winner of the game. In the case of ties, the second weakest colour is checked, and so on.

== Gameplay ==
The unusual victory condition ('highest lowest score wins') requires players to develop all six colours and drives a higher degree of strategic planning than would otherwise be the case. Tactical considerations include not only how many points a player will earn by placing a particular tile, but also which colours they will score on, often resulting in a trade-off between the two. Building large blocks of one colour also leads to higher scoring opportunities for one's opponent, and gameplay often revolves around a player tactically blocking a colour for which they have already established a scoring advantage.

== Awards and nominations ==
=== 2004 ===
- Schweizer Strategiespiele Preis
- Österreichischer Spielepreis Spiel der Spiele
- Deutscher Spiele Preis, 5th place
- Spiel des Jahres selection list
- International Gamers Award nomination
- Japan Board Game Prize nomination: Best Foreign Game for Beginners

=== 2005 ===
- US Games 100 for 2005, nomination: Best Abstract Strategy Game
- Mensa Select

== Mind Sports Olympiad Rules ==
=== Tournament ===
Swiss tournament, with at least 7 to 9 matches. Up to 10 players will all play against each other. In any case the precise number of matches will be announced before the beginning.

=== General rules ===
For what is not specified here, regular rules are in use.

=== Game ===
Each match consists of one game. The scoring charts are placed beside the board, both on the same side, with the same orientation and visible to both players. The first-named player plays first.

Each tile can be placed so that it touches any tile that is down or one of the special colour start cells. A player may change his rack if he has none of the colours in which he has the fewest points in, otherwise, a player's rack is replenished at the end of his turn.

A tile may be played for 0 points.

If a player gets a colour to 18 he gets another go but without replenishing his rack. It is possible to have more than one consecutive go. If a player gets 2 colours to 18 with the same move, he only gets one additional go.

The game continues until there is no room left on the board or a player gets 18 in all of the six colours. The score is worked out on the colour with the fewest points and the winner is the player with the highest among the lowest value; in case of a tie you go ahead with the second colour with the second-fewest points, and so on.

The winner gets 1 VP, while his opponent gets 0 VPs. In case of a draw (only if all the 6 colours are in the same position), both get ½ VP. At the end of each game, the levels of the colours with the fewest points and their differences are reported.

=== Time ===
Each player has 10 minutes. During his time the player declares aloud his score and moves the cubes (the opponent has to check in this very moment). If the player wants to change his rack, he has to declare it and to show his tiles before pressing the button.

As a player presses the button, he only can replenish his rack. If a player runs out of time, he stops playing and his opponent carries on playing till the game ends or his time expires. The winner is then decided in the usual way.

=== Ties ===
If at the end of the tournament 2 or more players have the same number of VPs, the following criteria are used in order as tie-breakers:

1. the results between players
2. the highest progressive difference of the colours with the fewest points
3. the highest progressive level of the colours with the fewest points

== Reviews ==
- Pyramid
- Family Games: The 100 Best

== Related games ==
=== 2006 ===
Einfach Genial - Reiseedition, produced by Kosmos (US version: Ingenious Travel Edition released by Fantasy Flight Games) is a travel version of the game, for two players only. This is much smaller than the regular version, and the plastic board incorporates indentations to hold the players' tiles as well as holes for the scoring pegs. Notably, there is a different tile distribution in the travel version of the game: 2 of each double tile and 3 of every other colour combination, compared with 5 and 6 respectively in the original game.

=== 2007 ===
Einfach Genial Knobelspass (Simply Ingenious Puzzles), also from Kosmos, uses cardboard versions of the tiles from the original game. The player has one of each of the 21 different tile combinations and for each puzzle must place these in the correct positions on a pre-printed sheet to match the coloured symbols.

Einfach Genial Junior is a simpler version of the game. It uses similar techniques of matching coloured symbols but utilises a square board instead of hexagons.

=== 2008 ===
Einfach Genial: Das Kartenspiel is a card game based on the original Einfach Genial.

Einfach Genial: Wer zu viel riskiert, verliert! ("Simply ingenious - who risks too much, loses!") uses the same coloured symbols, but each hexagonal playing tile only has one symbol.
