= Indigo (board game) =

Tile-laying board game

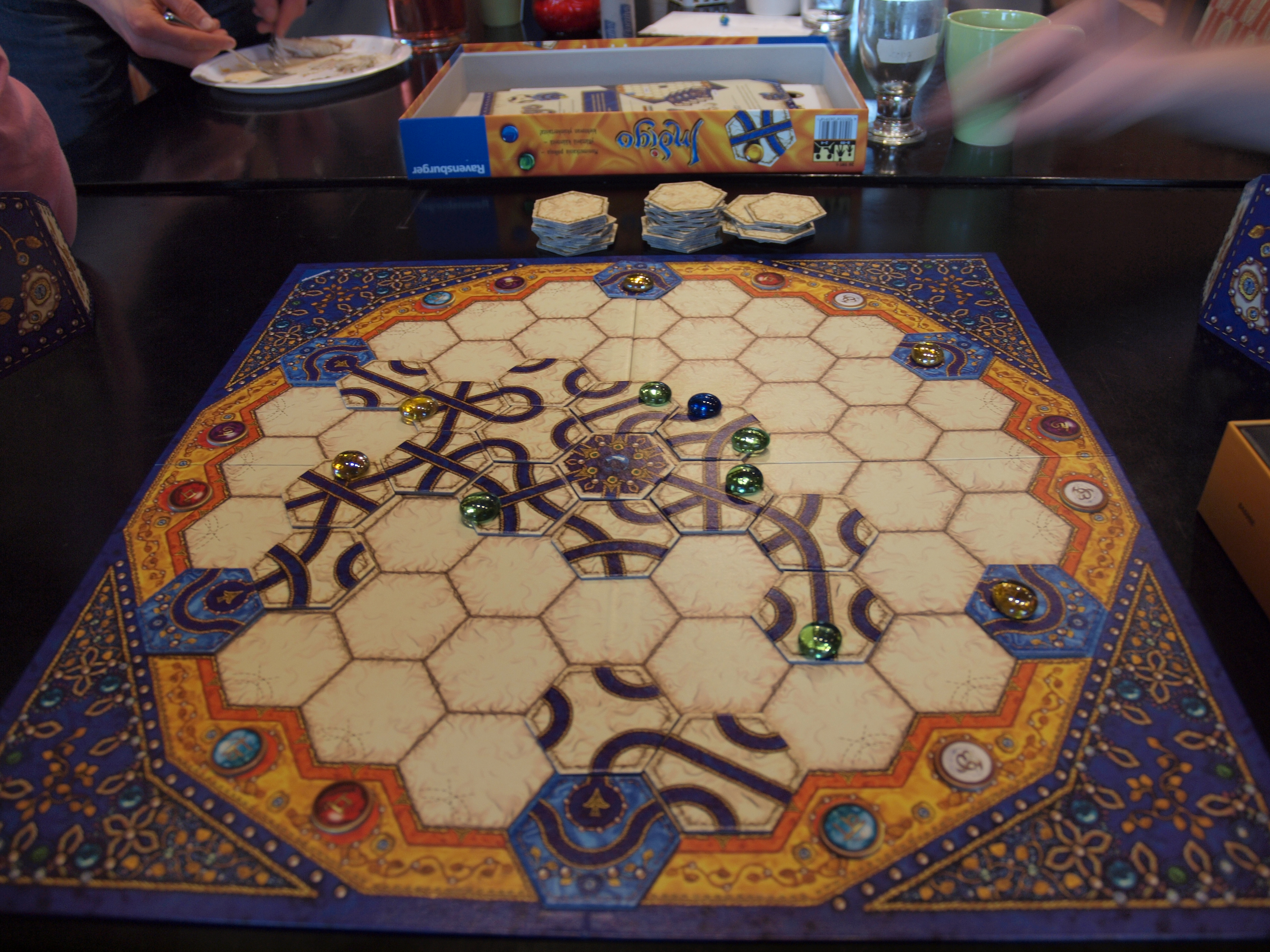
- Indigo during play
- Designers: Reiner Knizia
- Publishers: Ravensburger
- Publication: 2012
- Genres: Board game
- Players: 2-4

Indigo is a 2012 tile-laying board game developed by Reiner Knizia and published by Ravensburger.

== Rules ==
Indigo is a game for two to four players. The idea of the game is to collect jewels from the board by laying tiles.

The board takes the form of a hexagonal grid, with one tile present at the centre and six at the edge, with even intervals. The rest of the board is empty. On the centre tile are six jewels: one sapphire and five emeralds. The six tiles at the edge have one topaz each. The edges of the board between the tiles with topazes are marked with the players' colours. Depending on the number of players, a player can either have an edge all to themself, share an edge with another player, or both.

On their turn, a player places a tile anywhere on the board. The tiles have paths on them. If the tile touches another tile's edge having a jewel on it, the jewel travels along the formed path, only stopping when it hits empty space, the board's edge, or another jewel.

A jewel reaching the board's edge is removed from play, becoming the property of the edge's owner. If the edge is shared between two players, one player gets the jewel and the other gets a duplicate jewel from storage. If two jewels collide, both are removed from play, not becoming any player's property. On the centre tile, the sapphire may only be moved after all five emeralds are already in play.

The game ends when no jewels remain on the board. Then the players' jewels are scored. A sapphire awards 3 points, an emerald 2 points, and a topaz 1 point. The player with the most points wins.

== Reception ==
Nora Schreiber, reviewing from Spieletest, considered Indigo to be entertaining, praising its accessibility and strategy, but criticised its appeal for players who prefer more complex games. The game was also recommended for the 2012 Spiel des Jahres.
