= Qin (board game) =

2012 board game

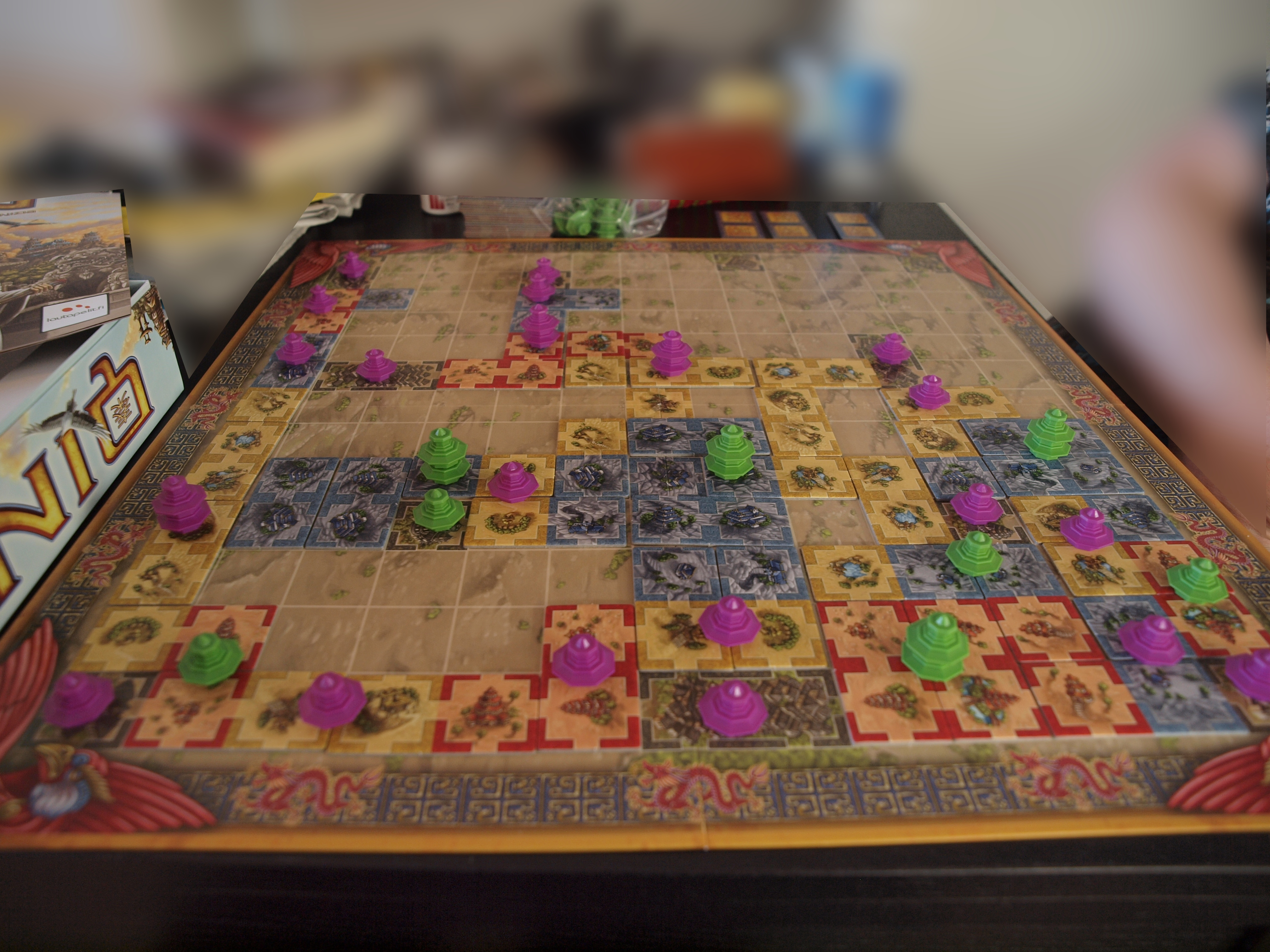
- Qin at the end of a two-player game
- Designers: Reiner Knizia
- Publication: 2012
- Players: 2-4
- Setup time: 1-5 minutes
- Playing time: 30-45 minutes
- Chance: Very low
- Skills: Area visualisation

Qin is a 2012 board game by Reiner Knizia. It is themed after the Qin dynasty in ancient China.

== Rules ==
Qin is a game for two to four players. Players represent competing kingdoms, intent on conquering territory in China. The game is played on a rectangular grid. Each player receives a number of pagodas, which come in four different colours: black, white, green and purple. Each player is assigned one colour.

On their turn, each player places a tile consisting of two squares on the board. Squares come in three different colours: red, yellow and blue. The colours of the squares do not correspond to the colours of the players. Tiles must be placed connecting to tiles already on the board.

If a player forms a contiguous area of at least two squares of the same colour, the area becomes a county in the player's kingdom, and they place a pagoda there. Contiguous areas of at least five squares count as large counties, marked with a double pagoda.

The board also includes villages. These are neutral at first, but become affiliated with whatever county touches them, with the player placing an additional pagoda on the village.

If a player joins two counties of the same colour, they merge into a larger county, with the player having the absolute majority of squares in the county claiming it as their own. The opponents' pagodas are removed. A player can also conquer another player's village by surrounding it with counties with more pagodas than its previous owner. The first player to place their last pagoda on the board wins.

A digital adaptation was released for iOS devices in 2017.
