= Elfenland =

Board game

- Box cover of Elfenland
- Designers: Alan R. Moon
- Publishers: Amigo Spiele; Rio Grande Games
- Players: 2–6
- Setup time: < 5 minutes
- Playing time: 60 minutes
- Age range: 10 and up
- Skills: Route planning Racing

Elfenland is a German-style board game designed by Alan R. Moon and published by Amigo Spiele in German and Rio Grande Games in English in 1998. Elfenland won the Spiel des Jahres award in 1998.

== Background ==
The game was originally based on his earlier game Elfenroads (published by White Wind), but since Elfenroads took about four hours for a game, the play was simplified to reduce the time closer to an hour, making it appeal more as a family game.

== Gameplay ==
The game is played by 2–6 players, with 4–5 making for the best game. Each player tries to reach as many cities as possible and then return to his "home city." Home cities are drawn at the beginning of the game from a pack of city cards and they remain hidden throughout the game. The game is thus reminiscent of the traveling salesman problem.

Players move using transportation cards. Elves can travel on a wide variety of vehicles including troll wagons, elf cycles, rafts, giant pigs, unicorns, dragons and magic clouds. Different types of transportation will travel better over different terrain, and some methods of transport cannot cross certain terrains at all. There is only one problem: you cannot travel over a route (except water) unless there is a tile on that road, and only the type of transport shown on the tile can be used to move along that road. Before anyone can move, tiles are drawn and laid out across the board. This part is the one that calls for the most strategy, as players try to line up their tiles to set up a nice route for themselves and a difficult one for their opponents at the same time.

As well as normal tiles, each player receives one trouble tile for use during the game. These hinder other players by forcing them to use an extra transportation card at that point. Also, any player can simply use any three cards to pass over any route that has a tile already there, allowing the type of transport shown on the tile to be ignored.

Players may need to find alternative routes when opponents place transportation types they cannot use along their intended paths.

== Expansion ==
There was an expansion for Elfenland published, called Elfengold. Note that this is different from the original Elfengold published by White Wind.

== Reception ==
Bernhard Fischer from Spieltest praised the game's mechanisms, and accessibility, but was mixed on the luck elements. It also won the 1998 Spiel des Jahres award, and placed third place in the 1998 Deutscher Spiele Preis award.

== Reviews ==
- Envoyer #24
