= High Society (card game) =

1995 card game

- Cover of Osprey Games 2018 edition
- Designers: Reiner Knizia
- Publishers: Ravensburger; Überplay; Amigo Spiele; University Games Corporation; Eagle-Gryphon Games; Osprey Games
- Publication: 1995; 30 years ago
- Genres: Card game
- Players: 3-5
- Playing time: 15-30 minutes
- Age range: 10+

High Society is an auction card game designed by Reiner Knizia and published by Ravensburger in 1995. Players bid against each other to acquire valuable items while avoiding undesirable cards.

== Description ==
High Society is a card game for 3 to 5 players in which players try to obtain the highest valued collection of exotic items, while trying to ensure that they are not the player with the least amount of cash at the end of the game.

Each player is given a set of eleven bidding cards resembling cheques that have values ranging from $1000 to $25,000. The game also has a set of 16 item cards:

- 10 items with values from 1 to 10.
- 3 "Promotion to Peerage" cards that double the value of a collection at the end of the game.
- 3 undesirable cards:
  - a Gambling Debt with a negative value of -5
  - a Theft card that forces a player to discard an item from their collection
  - a Scandal card that halves the value of a collection at the end of the game.

The 16 item cards are shuffled and placed in the center of the table. The starting player turns over the top card.

=== Desirable item ===
If the card is a desirable item, the starting player names a bid and places that value of cheques on the table. Each successive player has the option to pass or make a higher bid. If a player passes, they are out of that auction and can retrieve their cheques. As play moves around the table, each player who has not passed still has the option to pass or to add to their original bid by placing another cheque on top of what they have already bid. However, the player must raise by the full amount of the new cheque. For example, if a player wants to raise a bid by only $1000, but the lowest denomination cheque they have left is $10,000, then the player must choose between raising the bid by $10,000 or passing.

Play continues until all but one player have passed. The winning player loses the cheques they used for their bid, and the item is placed face up in front of the winning player.

=== Undesirable cards ===
The auction for undesirable cards works in reverse: The first player to pass "wins" the auction, takes possession of the undesirable item, and retrieves all their cheques played. In contrast, all of the other players lose any cheques that they played.

=== Victory conditions ===
The three Promotion to Peerage cards and the Scandal card are bordered in red. When the fourth red card is turned over, the game immediately ends.

- The player with the lowest amount of cash remaining in their hand is eliminated, even if that player's collection of items is worth the most.
- The remaining players then add up the values of their item collections; the player with the highest total wins.

== Publishing history ==
High Society was designed by Reiner Knizia and originally published in 1995 by Ravensburger with illustrations from Ulf Marckwort. In Eurogames : the design, culture and play of modern European board games, Stewart Woods tried to define the Eurogame genre, and noted that High Society not only uses the common Eurogame mechanism of the auction, but also uses the common ERurogame element where "players may be bidding to not receive the item that is being auctioned due to the negative impact of the resource under auction."

In 2003, Amigo Spiele published High Society with an animal theme under the name Einfach Tierisch (Simply Beastly). In 2006, University Games Corporation published a French version, Animalement Vôtre (Animally Yours), and a Dutch version, Beestenveiling (Animal Auction).

In 2003, the game was re-published by Überplay as the company's first game produced entirely in-house, and featured updated graphics by Alvin Madden. It was later republished by Eagle-Gryphon Games in 2008, and again in 2018 by Osprey Games with art by Asunción Macián Ruiz, in the style of the Art Nouveau painter Alphonse Mucha.

== Reception ==
Greg Aleknevicus, writing for The Games Journal, praised the game for its "many paths to defeat" game system and artwork, stating that "if you're looking for an auction game that plays well with few players, you can't do any better than High Society." In a review for Dicebreaker, Thomas Wells praised the game for its simple yet tactical ruleset and card management requirement.

Dave Farquhar, writing for Ken Tidwell's Game Cabinet called this game " a little gem. There is nothing spectacular about it, but play balance is just right. Players never know quite when the game will end, and the identity of the winner will not be revealed until this moment." Although Farquhar was worried that playing the game a few times would reveal a predictable winning formula, he found instead that "The game varies greatly depending on how the cards come out. If the 'bad' cards come out first players are so busy fighting them off they have little money to actually bid. If the 'good' cards come out first, those with the most points tend to have the least money left to avoid the setbacks."

Writing for the Finnish website Lautapeliopas, Mikko Saari called High Society "an elegant and stylish game. The game is varied by the random order of the auctions and the uncertain ending ... The ending may surprise you."

Frank Biegen, writing for the German review site Reich der Spiele, noted that the game "offers a lot of fun potential with a manageable set of rules." However, Biegen didn't like the sudden ending, commenting, "the winner seems to be determined more by chance: the sudden end seems arbitrary and unsatisfactory."

== Awards ==
High Society came third place in Fairplay's 1995 Á la Carte board game prize awards. It placed tenth in the 1995 Deutscher Spiele Preis.
