= Goldrausch =

1990 card game

Goldrausch (also called Gold Rush and Gold Digger) is a card game published in 1990 by Hans im Glück. It is one of the first published games by prolific game designer Reiner Knizia, the rules, using two decks of regular playing cards, were first published in his book New Tactical Games With Dice and Cards.

== Contents ==
Goldrausch is a card game about the California Gold Rush.

== Reception ==
Mark R Green reviewed Gold Rush for Games International magazine, and gave it a rating of 6 out of 10, and stated that "Gold Rush is a good game with some tension and a degree of simple decision making."

Goldrausch was nominated for the 1990 Deutscher Spiele Preis.

== Reviews ==
- Pyramid
