= Ribbit (game) =

Children's board game

Ribbit is a children race board game for 2-5 players designed by Reiner Knizia and published in 2004. The original German name of the game is Schildkrötenrennen .

== Reception ==
Reviews:

- Rebel Times #16 (as Pędzące Żółwie)
- Świat Gier Planszowych #8 (as Pędzące Żółwie)

Awards and honors:

- 2013 Le Lys Enfant Finalist
- 2012 Årets Spill Best Children's Game Nominee
- 2007 As d'Or - Jeu de l'Année Nominee
- 2005 Spiel des Jahres Kinderspiel Nominee
- 2005 Kinderspielexperten "5-to-9-year-olds" Nominee
