= Medici (board game) =

Auction-based board game by Reiner Knizia

- The box cover of Medici
- Designers: Reiner Knizia
- Publication: 1995
- Players: 3 to 6
- Playing time: 1 hour
- Age range: 10 and up

Medici is a German-style board game by Reiner Knizia. Players buy cards in an auction and match in series and in sets to end up with most points from those formations.

Before he was a game designer, Reiner Knizia was a quantitative analyst, a profession that manages and attempts to price risk for banks. This is fitting as the Medicis were bankers and traders who improved accounting standards and as such would have built their financial empire on judging risks. In this tradition, Medici the board game is based on the pricing of risk: each lot of commodities has an uncertain future value based on how cards are drawn from the deck, what other players buy, and other factors. In order to play the game well, players must judge and price the risk attached to each lot of cards, buying them for a price appropriate to their expected value and the riskiness of the investment.

Medici placed 5th in the 1995 Deutscher Spiele Preis

Medici placed in the top 3 in the 1995 Meeples' Choice Awards.

== About Reiner Knizia ==
Reiner Knizia has more than 700 published games, spanning a 25-year career.
