= Blue Moon City =

2006 board and card game

- The box cover of Blue Moon City
- Designers: Reiner Knizia
- Publishers: Fantasy Flight Games (U.S.); Κάισσα (Greece)
- Publication: 2006
- Players: 2 to 4
- Age range: 10 and up

Blue Moon City is a 2006 designer board game by Reiner Knizia. The game has similar artwork to, and some thematic connections with, the Blue Moon card game, also designed by Knizia. It is a city-building game with a heavy fantasy theme.

== Publication history ==
Shannon Appelcline explained that in the early 2000s, "Fantasy Flight's eurogame production started to slow as the company increasingly developed its own voice. Top games like Reiner Knizias' Blue Moon City (2006) and Beowulf: The Movie Board Game (2007) — the latter a redevelopment of an older FFG title — appeared, but they were a dwindling part of FFG's board game production."

== Reception ==
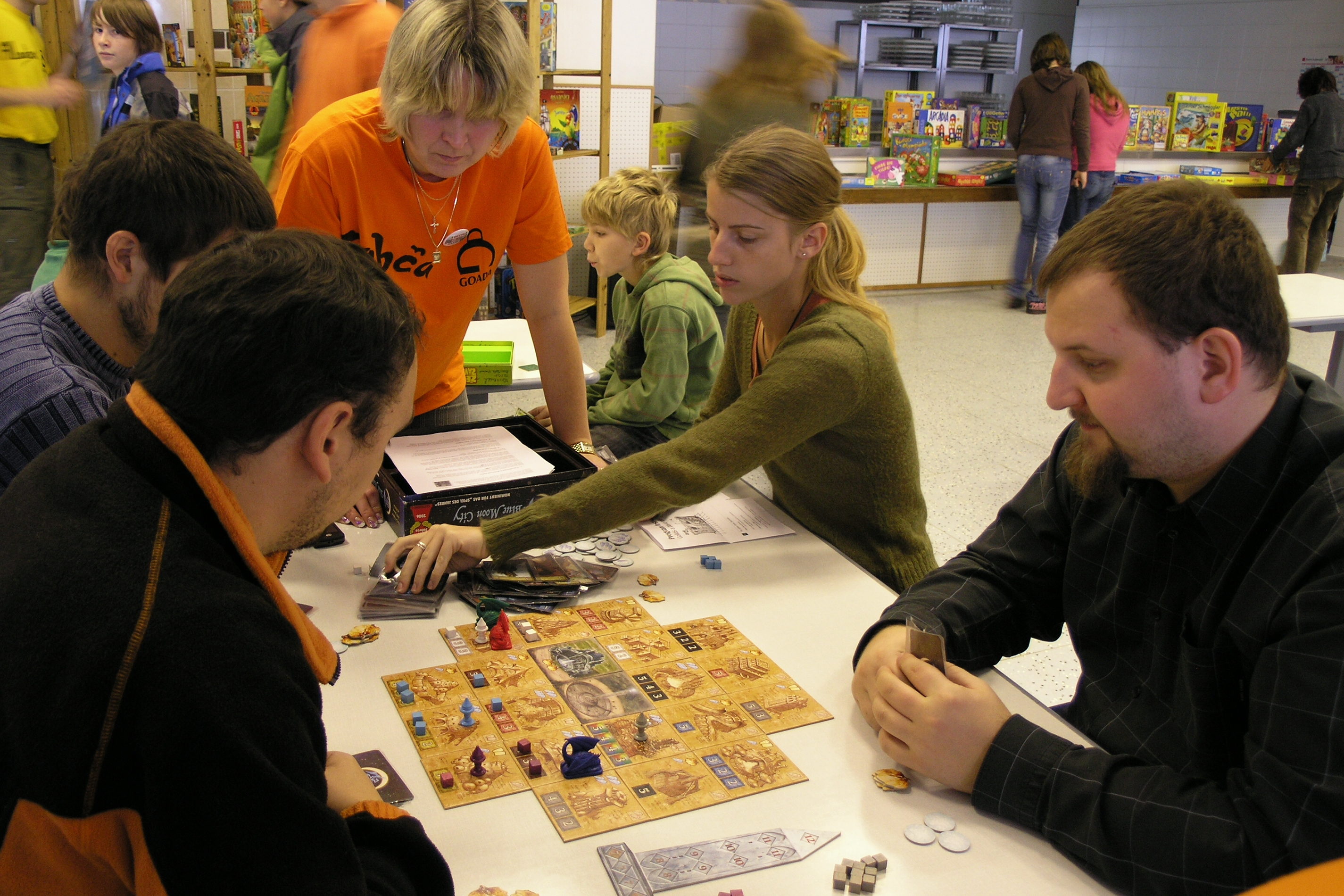
Players during a 2009 local meetup

Mikko Saari from Lautapeliopas praised the game's elegance and engagement. He stated that the game was "not very far from popular card-based war games in terms of basic mechanics". It also won the 2006 Meeples' Choice Award, and was ranked 4th Place in the 2006 Deutscher Spiele Preis. It was also nominated for the 2006 Spiel des Jahres awards.

=== Reviews ===
- Rebel Times #4
