= Rio Grande Games =

American board game publisher

- Industry: Games and entertainment
- Headquarters: Placitas, New Mexico, U.S.
- Products: Board games
- Website: riograndegames.com

Rio Grande Games is a board game publisher based in Placitas, New Mexico. The company primarily imports and localizes foreign language German-style board games.

== History ==
In 1995, Jay Tummelson began working for Mayfair Games. At that time, Mayfair had begun to import German-style board games for sale, without doing any localization. Tummelson first suggested that they incorporate an English translation, and then that they completely localize the game for American audiences. Tummelson acquired the rights for Detroit/Cleveland Grand Prix, Manhattan, Modern Art, Streetcar, and The Settlers of Catan, which were published together in 1996.

One part of the localization process was to create original art and components. Tummelson thought that a better solution would be to use the same artwork and components as the originals and to share the cost of printing with the European publishers, as well. In 1998, he founded Rio Grande Games to take that approach.

Since then, Rio Grande Games has published over 350 games and has had a significant effect on board gaming in the United States.

The most popular of the games published by Rio Grande Games are Carcassonne, Puerto Rico, Dominion, Power Grid, Race for the Galaxy, Bohnanza, and Lost Cities. More recently, Rio Grande Games has begun publishing its own games and has even begun licensing its games to partners in other countries wanting to localize the games in their local languages. Thus, Race for the Galaxy will soon be seen in Chinese, Korean, and others, as well as its original English, French, and German.

== Notable games ==
Rio Grande has published a number of award-winning games.

Spiel des Jahres

- Dominion (2009)
- Zooloretto (2007)
- Thurn and Taxis (2006)
- Niagara (2005)
- Power Grid (2004)
- Alhambra (2003)
- Carcassonne (2001)
- Torres (2000)
- Tikal (1999)
- Elfenland (1998)
- Mississippi Queen (1997)
- El Grande (1996)

Deutscher Spiele Preis

- Dominion (2009)
- Caylus (2006)
- Louis XIV (2005)
- Saint Petersburg (2004)
- Amun Re (2003)
- Puerto Rico (2002)
- Carcassonne (2001)
- Taj Mahal (2000)
- Tikal (1999)
- Löwenherz (1997)
- El Grande (1996)

== See also ==
- Going Cardboard (Documentary)
- Race game
