= Lost Cities =

Card game by Reiner Knizia

- Lost Cities
- Designers: Reiner Knizia
- Publishers: Kosmos; Rio Grande Games
- Publication: 1999
- Players: 2
- Setup time: 1 minute
- Playing time: 30 minutes
- Chance: Medium
- Age range: 10 and up
- Skills: Strategic thought

Lost Cities is a 60-card card game designed in 1999 by game designer Reiner Knizia and published by several publishers. The objective of the game is to mount profitable expeditions to one or more of the five lost cities (the Himalayas, the Brazilian Rain Forest, the Desert Sands, the Ancient Volcanos and Neptune's Realm). The game was originally intended as a 2-player game, but rule variants contributed by fans allow one or two further players, causing Knizia to later provide semi-official four-player rules.

== Summary ==
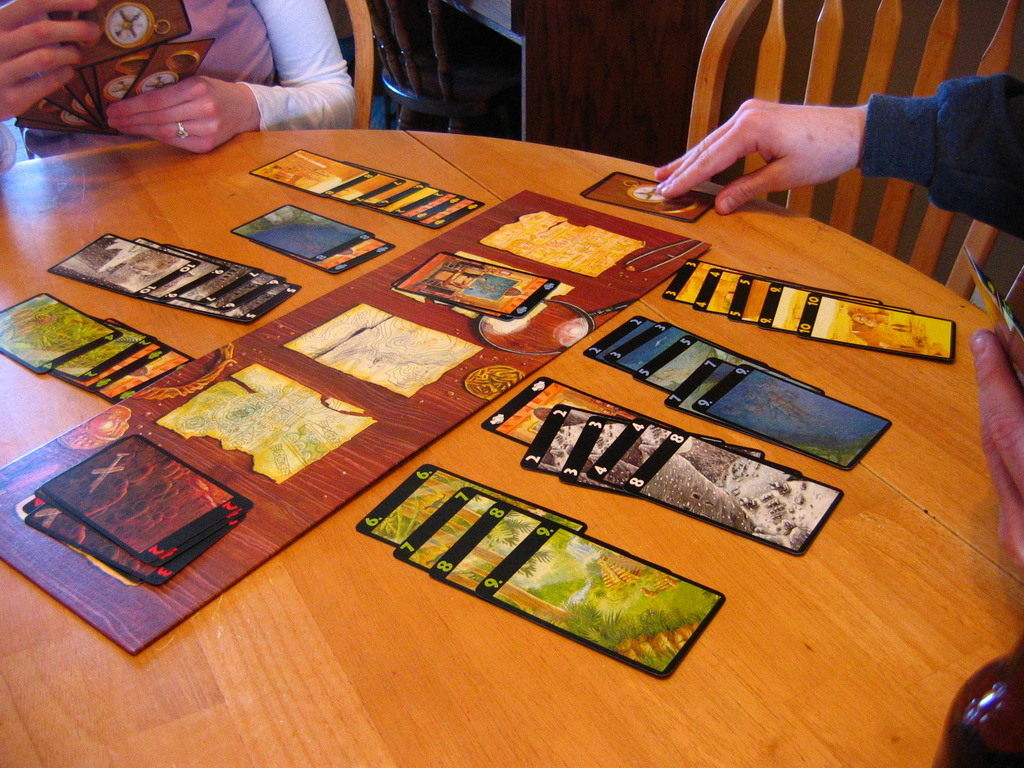
A game of Lost Cities

Lost Cities is a fast-moving game, with players playing or discarding, and then replacing, a single card each turn. Cards represent progress on one of five color-coded expeditions. Players must decide during the game how many expeditions to embark upon. Card-play rules are quite straightforward, but because players can only move forward on an expedition (by playing cards higher-numbered than those already played), making the right choice in a given situation can be quite difficult. An expedition that has been started will earn points for its progress when the game ends, and after three rounds, the player with the highest total score wins the game. Each expedition that is started but not thoroughly charted incurs a negative point penalty (investment costs).

Interaction between players is indirect; one cannot directly impact another player's expeditions. However, since players can draw from the common discard piles, they can make use of opposing discards. Additionally, since the available cards for a given expedition are finite, progress made by an opponent in a given color can lead to difficulty making progress in that same color.

The game's board, while designed to supplement the theme, is optional and consists only of simple marked areas where players place discards. If Lost Cities had four expeditions instead of five, it could be played with a standard deck of playing cards. When doing so, the face cards would represent investment cards, with numbered cards two through ten serving as the expedition progress cards.

=== Expedition 6: The Lost Expedition ===
At GenCon 2016, The Lost Cities: Sixth Expedition promo pack was given away. It contains a set of grey cards that are added to the base game as an additional expedition. The sixth expedition has the same rules as the other five.

In 2018, some newer international versions of Lost Cities were expected to also include Expedition 6 as well as two-sided boards. One side with five expeditions, the other side with six. Starting from 2019, the game now includes this extra expedition, for a total of six colored suits with a two-sided board.

== Awards ==
- Won the 2000 International Gamers Award.

== Lost Cities: The Board Game ==
The 2008 game Keltis was re-themed and published in the U.S. as Lost Cities: The Board Game. The game supports up to four players and is a more complex version of the original card game.

== Xbox Live Arcade ==
Lost Cities was published by Sierra Online for the Xbox Live Arcade platform on April 23, 2008. The title supports both online play against other humans and solo play against computer-controlled opponents. It was delisted on 20 February 2009 after a merger between Activision and Vivendi. It is currently not available for purchase.

== Reviews ==
- Pyramid
- Family Games: The 100 Best
