= Valdora =

Valdora is a 2009 board game published by ABACUSSPIELE.

== Gameplay ==
Valdora is a game in which adventurers race into a hidden valley of vast riches, competing through clever planning and swift gem‑gathering to outmaneuver rivals and claim fortune.

== Reviews ==
- Black Gate
- Świata Gier Planszowych #10
