= Amun-Re (board game) =

Board game

- Box cover of Amun-Re
- Designers: Reiner Knizia
- Publishers: Rio Grande Games; Hans im Glück; 999 Games
- Publication: 2003
- Players: 3–5
- Setup time: 5 minutes
- Playing time: 60–90 minutes
- Skills: Bidding, Strategic thought

Amun-Re is a game designed by Reiner Knizia and first published in 2003 by Hans im Glück in German and in English by Rio Grande Games.

Players are leaders of different Egyptian dynasties who try to gain influence in 15 provinces of ancient Egypt. Influence and building pyramids earns points for the players. Points are scored at two instances during the game, at the end of the "Old Kingdom" and at the end of the "New Kingdom", and the player who amasses the most points wins the game.

== Gameplay ==
Amun-Re is played in six rounds, where each round consists of an auction of provinces, followed by the purchase of "power cards" (for special use or that give bonuses in scoring), farmers (that generate income), and bricks (which are converted into pyramids on a three-for-one basis), a sacrifice phase, and then income. All prices in auctions, as well as for purchases, are based on the triangular numbers.

The number of provinces available for auction in each round is equal to the number of players, but it is randomly determined which provinces will be available. Each province gives the player who wins it different abilities. For example, some provinces can support more farmers, some allow the players to buy more cards, and some produce a set income automatically. Certain power cards also give game-end bonuses if a player's provinces meet certain conditions, such as being on the same side of the Nile. Once the provinces have been auctioned, players may buy power cards and farmers as allowed by the provinces that they own, and as many bricks as they want or can afford.

Following purchases, there is a sacrifice where each player either sacrifices a number of gold or can steal from the sacrifice (and a player must either sacrifice or steal, "sacrificing" 0 gold isn't allowed). Rewards are given to players based on their sacrifice (highest sacrifice receiving the most reward, "thieves" getting no reward beyond the three gold they steal). Players may choose whether they wish to receive cards, bricks, farmers, or some combination of these as rewards.

Finally, players receive income. The sacrifice that has just taken place determines the income generated by each farmer. In certain provinces, income is only generated if the sacrifice is below a certain level. Other provinces provide a fixed amount of gold, or a combination of farmer income and fixed income.

As the ends of rounds three and six (the end of the "Old Kingdom" and "New Kingdom") points are scored for pyramids, sets of pyramids, temples in territories controlled, and for bonuses earned using power cards. At the end of the Old Kingdom, players lose their claim to all of their provinces and all farmers are cleared from the board, while bricks and pyramids remain. The same provinces will be used in the New Kingdom, but they will be auctioned again and may be owned by different players.

Although this game is best played with 5 players so the entire board is used, it does play quite well with 3 or 4. The game allows for many different strategies to be used.

== Awards and critical reception ==
- Amun-Re won the 2003 Deutscher Spiele Preis.
