= Eurogame =

Type of board game

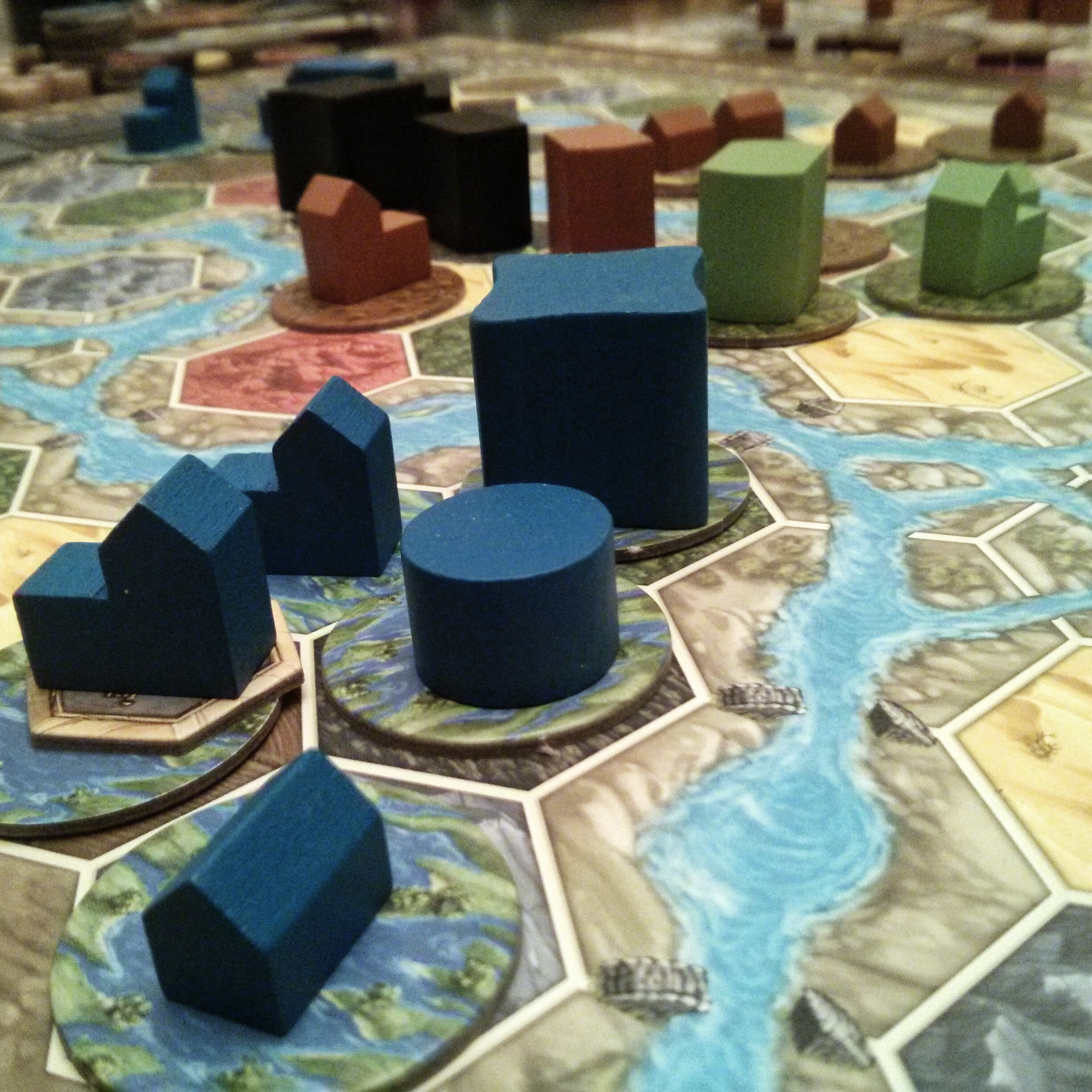
Pieces on the board during Terra Mystica gameplay

A Eurogame, also called a German-style board game, German game, or Euro-style game (generally only referred to as board games in Europe), is a class of tabletop games which generally feature indirect player interaction and lack of player elimination, while providing multiple ways to score points and win. Euro-style games are sometimes contrasted with American-style board games, which generally involve more luck, conflict, and drama. They are less abstract than games like chess or Go and more focused on economic competition than wargames. At the same time, they generally require more thought and planning than party games like Pictionary and Trivial Pursuit.

== History ==
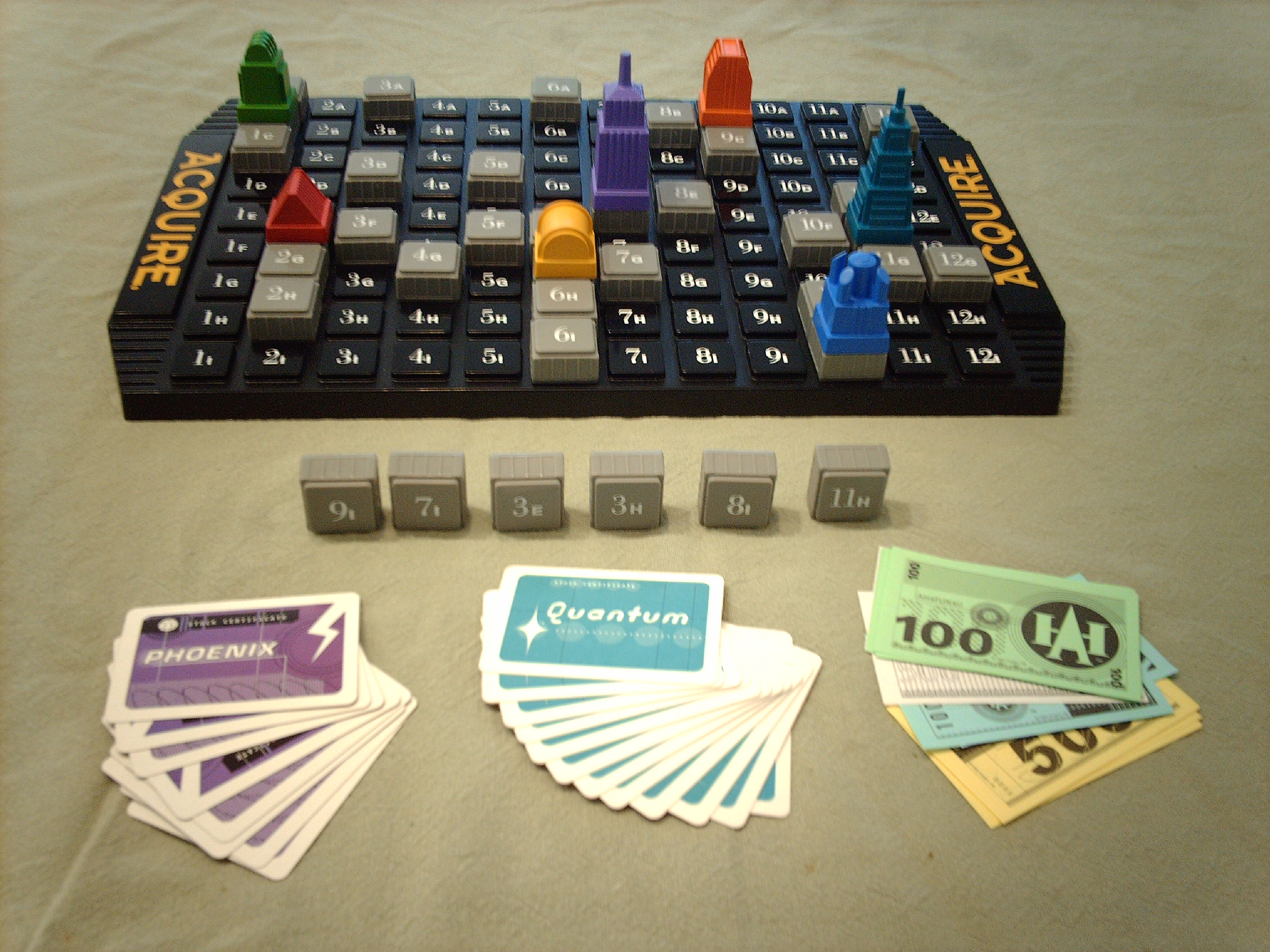
The 1999 Hasbro version of Acquire

Due in part to postwar aversion to products glorifying conflict, the 3M series of strategy and economic games, including Acquire, became popular in Germany. They offered a style of gameplay without direct conflict or warfare and led the way for designs that focused on resource management and competitive strategy through more peaceful means.

=== German family board games ===
The genre developed as a more concentrated design movement in the late 1970s and early 1980s in Germany. The genre spread to other European countries including France, the Netherlands, and Sweden. During that time, board games in Europe often featured shorter play times than their American counterparts, along with rules that reduced the risk of early elimination, thereby encouraging all players to remain engaged until the end of the game.

=== Settlers of Catan ===
Although German-style designs were already popular within Germany, The Settlers of Catan, first published in 1995, paved the way for the genre outside Europe. While it was not the first Eurogame and not the first to achieve popularity outside Germany, it became more successful than any of its predecessors. Millions of copies were sold in Germany alone. The game's success brought new interest, investment, and attention to this genre of board games emphasizing mechanics other than direct conflict. Game designers like Reiner Knizia became popular globally. Knizia's notable designs include Amun-Re, Blue Moon City, Ingenious, Keltis, Lord of the Rings, Medici, Modern Art, Ra, Taj Mahal, Tigris and Euphrates, and Through the Desert. Many of his designs incorporate mathematical principles, such as his repeated use of auction mechanics.

=== Growth in the 21st century ===
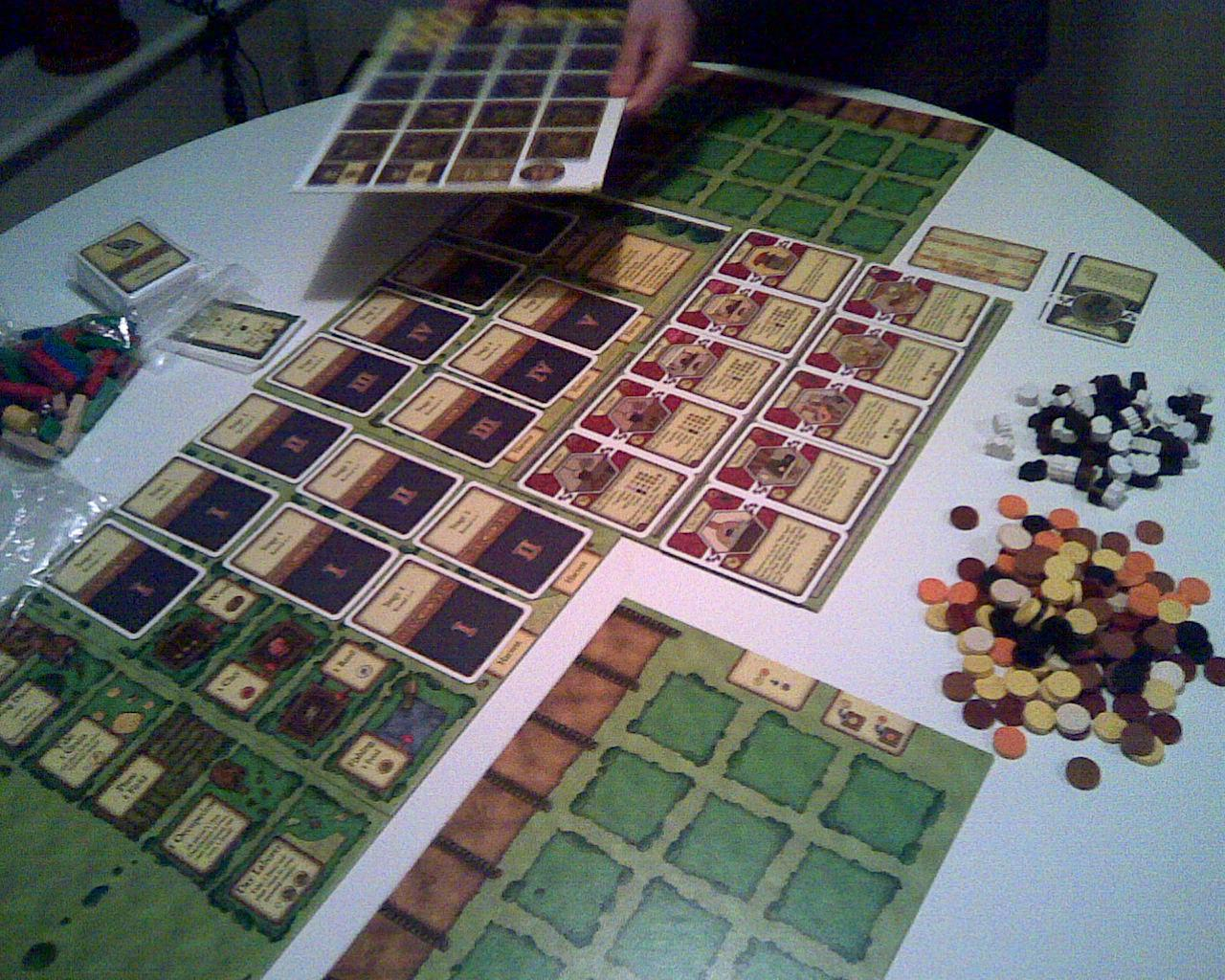
A game of Agricola being set up

As the market expanded, some designers began creating deeper, more complex games often referred to as “gamer’s games” or “expert games.” Titles such as Agricola (2007) by Uwe Rosenberg and Terra Mystica (2012) by Helge Ostertag and Jens Drögemüller introduced more detailed resource management, longer playing times, and heightened decision depth. These games often came with multiple paths to victory, ensuring replay value and a variety of strategies for enthusiasts. Residents of Germany purchased more board games per capita than any other country as of 2009. While many Eurogames are published and played in Anglophone markets such as the United States and the United Kingdom, they occupy a niche status there. Other games in the genre to achieve widespread popularity include Carcassonne, Puerto Rico, TransAmerica, Ticket to Ride, Alhambra, Brass, Terraforming Mars, Concordia, and Ark Nova. Today, Eurogames remain an important segment of the board gaming industry, appreciated for their emphasis on strategy, thoughtful interaction, and lack of player elimination that allows all participants to remain engaged. While Germany still leads in per capita board game purchases, the popularity of Eurogames has spread worldwide, and many titles now receive international distribution and acclaim. Conventions in Germany gather thousands of fans annually, and 204,000 attended Essen Spiel in 2024.

== Characteristics ==
Eurogames tend to be focused on presenting a complex challenge to players. They feature individual economic competition and resource management rather than direct conflict, and have a limited amount of luck. They also differ from abstract strategy games like chess by using themes tied to specific locales. Eurogames also emphasize the mechanical challenges of their systems over having the systems match the theme of the game. They are generally simpler than the wargames which flourished in the 1970s and 1980s from publishers such as SPI and Avalon Hill, but still often have a considerable depth of play.

One consequence of the increasing popularity of this genre has been an increase in complexity. Games such as Puerto Rico that were considered quite complex when Eurogames proliferated in the U.S. after the turn of the millennium are now the norm, with newer high-end titles like Terra Mystica and Tzolkin being significantly more complex.

=== Incentive for social play ===
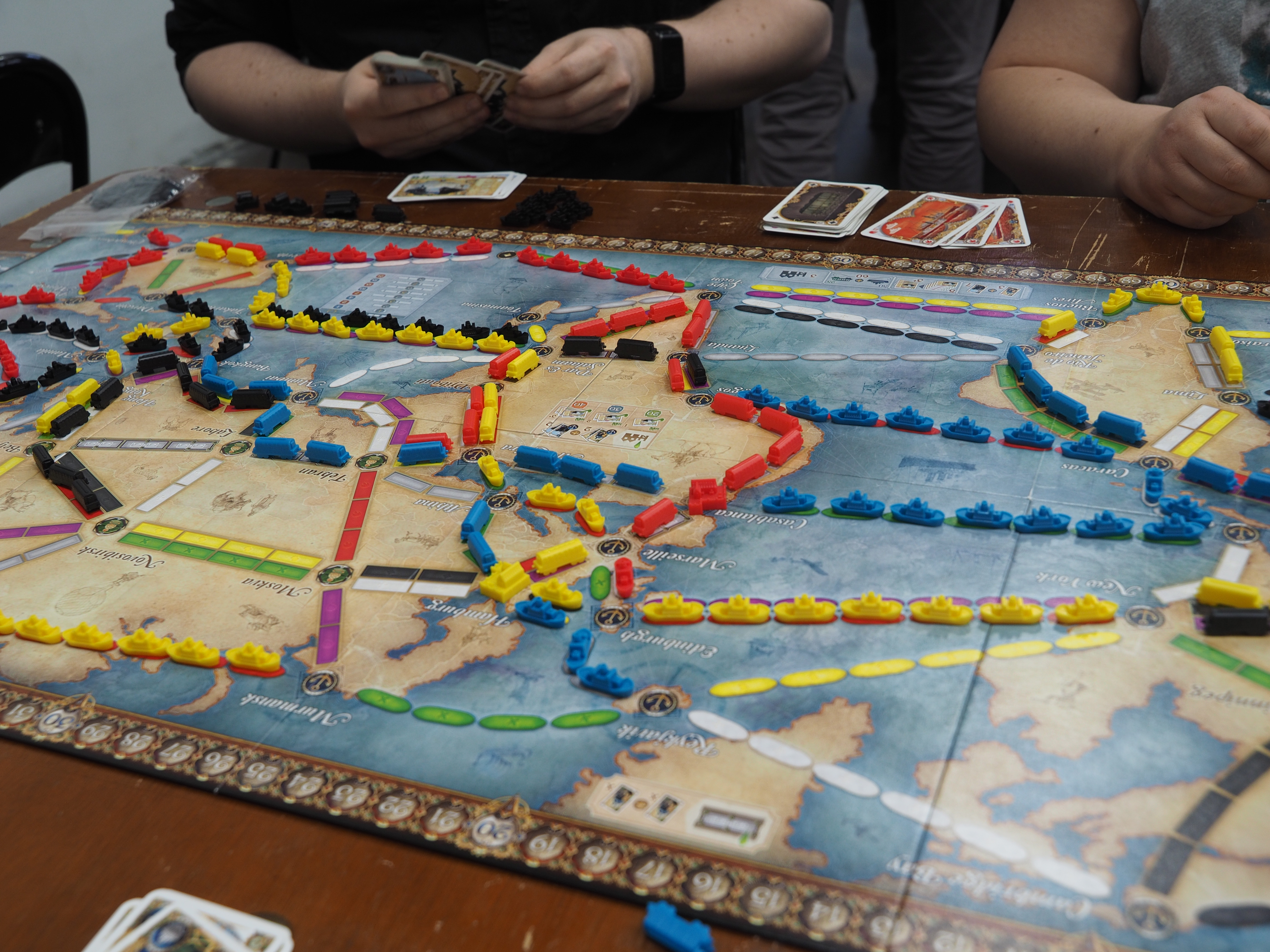
A four-player game of Ticket to Ride near the end of the game

Eurogames tend to be well-suited to social play. In contrast to games such as Risk or Monopoly, in which a close game can extend indefinitely, Eurogames usually have mechanics to limit the playing time. Common mechanisms include a predetermined winning score, a set number of game turns, or depletion of limited game resources. Playing time varies from a half-hour to a few hours, with one to two hours being typical. Generally, Eurogames do not have a fixed number of players like chess or bridge. Although there is a sizable body of Eurogames that are designed for exactly two players, most games can accommodate between two to six players (with varying degrees of suitability). Six-player games are somewhat rare; examples include Power Grid and Caverna (the latter supporting seven-player games). Some require expansions, such as The Settlers of Catan or Carcassonne. Players usually play for themselves, rather than in a partnership or team.

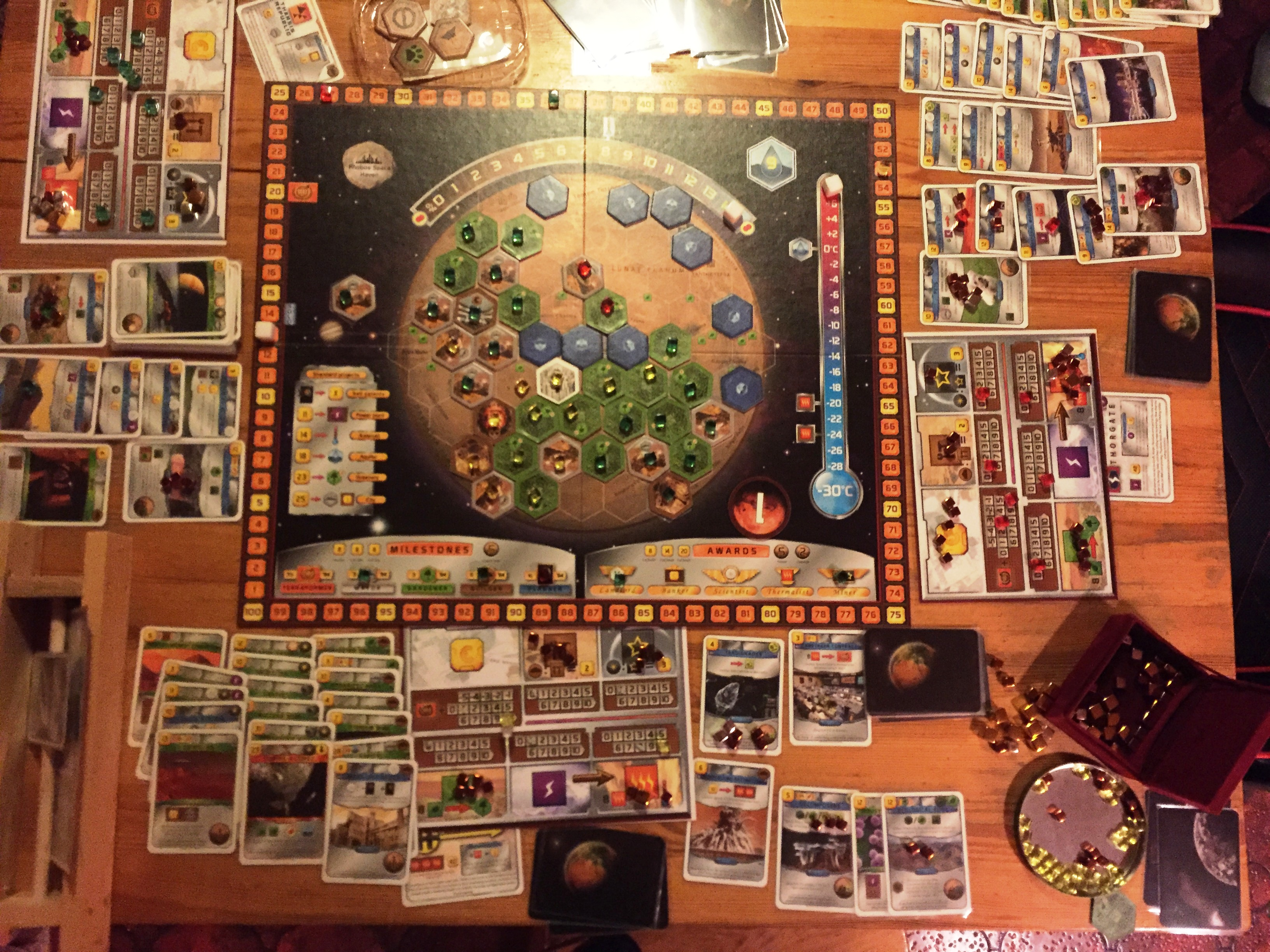
Terraforming Mars, a basic three-player game (shows the board, the player boards, and the players' cards at the end of a game round)

A growing number of Eurogames support solo play with modified rulesets. To win, the player either has to achieve specific single-player campaign goals or beat the score of a simulated opponent that takes actions according to special rules outlined in the scenario. Recent Eurogames suitable for solo play include Wingspan, Terraforming Mars, and Spirit Island.

=== No player elimination ===
Another prominent characteristic of these games is the lack of player elimination. Eliminating players before the end of the game is seen as contrary to the social aspect of such games. Most of the games are designed to keep all players in the game as long as possible, so it is rare to be certain of victory or defeat until relatively late in the game. Related to no-player-elimination, Eurogame scoring systems are often designed so that hidden scoring or end-of-game bonuses can catapult a player who appears to be in a lagging position at end of play into the lead. A second-order consequence is that Eurogames tend to have multiple paths to victory (dependent on aiming at different end-of-game bonuses) and it is often not obvious to other players which strategic path a player is pursuing. Balancing mechanisms are often integrated into the rules, giving slight advantages to lagging players and slight hindrances to the leaders. That helps to keep the game competitive to the very end, an example of which is Power Grid, where the turn order is determined by number of cities (and biggest power plant as the tie-breaker), such that players further ahead are handicapped in their option of plays.

=== Game mechanics ===
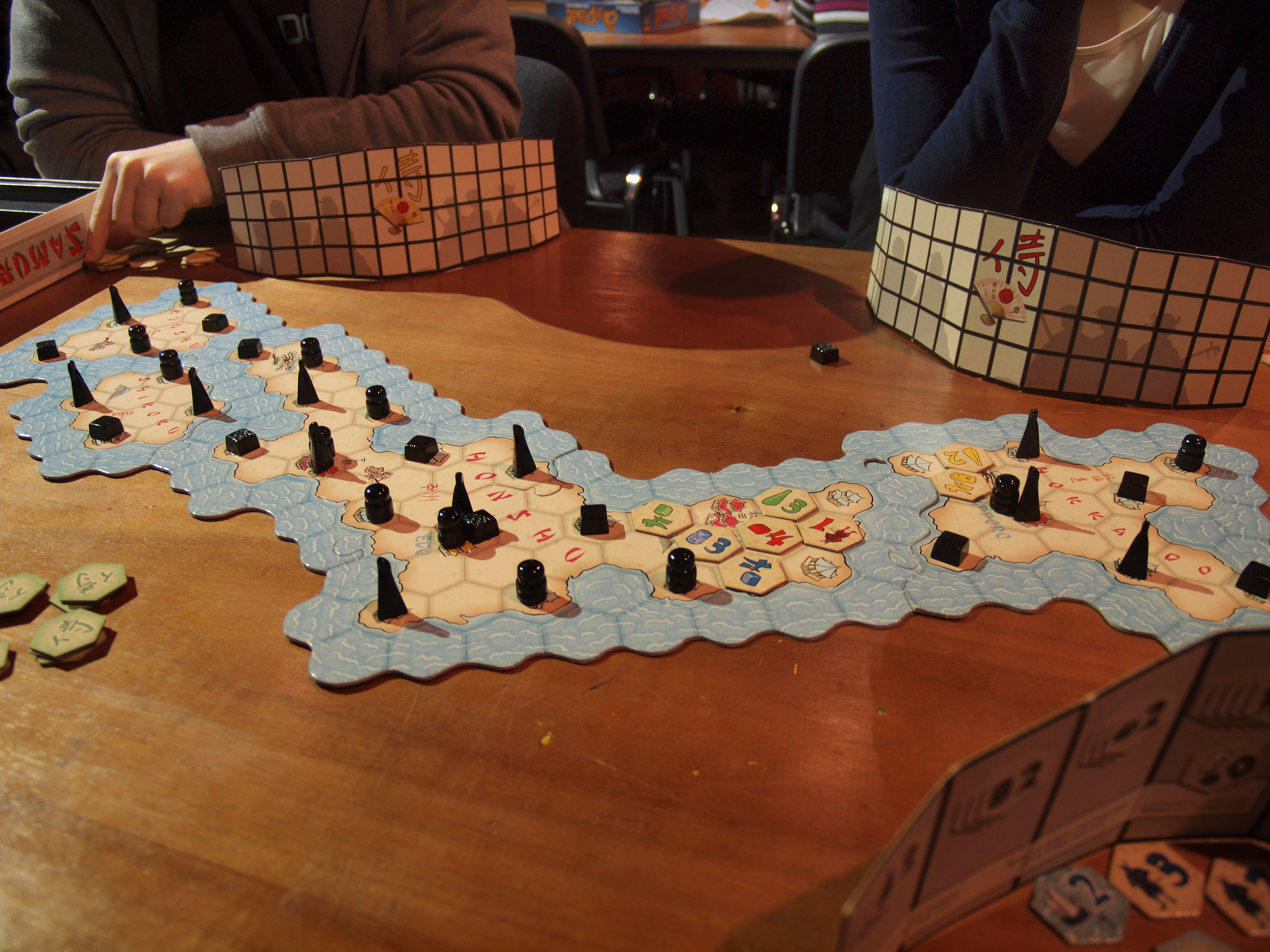
Samurai is a game of tile placement, set collection, and area control.

A wide variety of often innovative mechanics are used, and familiar mechanics such as rolling dice and moving, capture, or trick-taking are avoided. If a game has a board, the board is usually irregular rather than uniform or symmetric (such as Risk rather than chess or Scrabble). The board is often random (as in The Settlers of Catan) or has random elements (such as Tikal). Some boards are merely mnemonic or organizational and contribute only to ease of play, like a cribbage board; examples include Puerto Rico and Princes of Florence. Random elements are often present but do not usually dominate the game. While rules are light to moderate, they allow depth of play, usually requiring thought, planning, and a shift of tactics through the game.

Stewart Woods' Eurogames cites six examples of mechanics common to eurogames:

- Tile placement – spatial placement of game components on the playing board.
- Auctions – includes open and hidden auctions of both resources and actions from other players and the game system itself.
- Trading/negotiation – not simply trading resources of equivalent values, but allowing players to set markets.
- Set collection – collecting resources in specific groups that are then cashed in for points or other currency.
- Area control – also known as area majority or influence, this involves controlling a game element or board space through allocation of resources.
- Worker placement or role selection – players choose specific game actions in sequential order, with players disallowed from choosing a previously selected action.

=== Low randomness ===
Eurogame designs tend to de-emphasize luck and random elements. Often, the only random element of the game will be resource or terrain distribution in the initial setup, or (less frequently) the random order of a set of event or objective cards. The role played by deliberately random mechanics in other styles of game is instead fulfilled by the unpredictability of the behavior of other players.

=== Themes ===
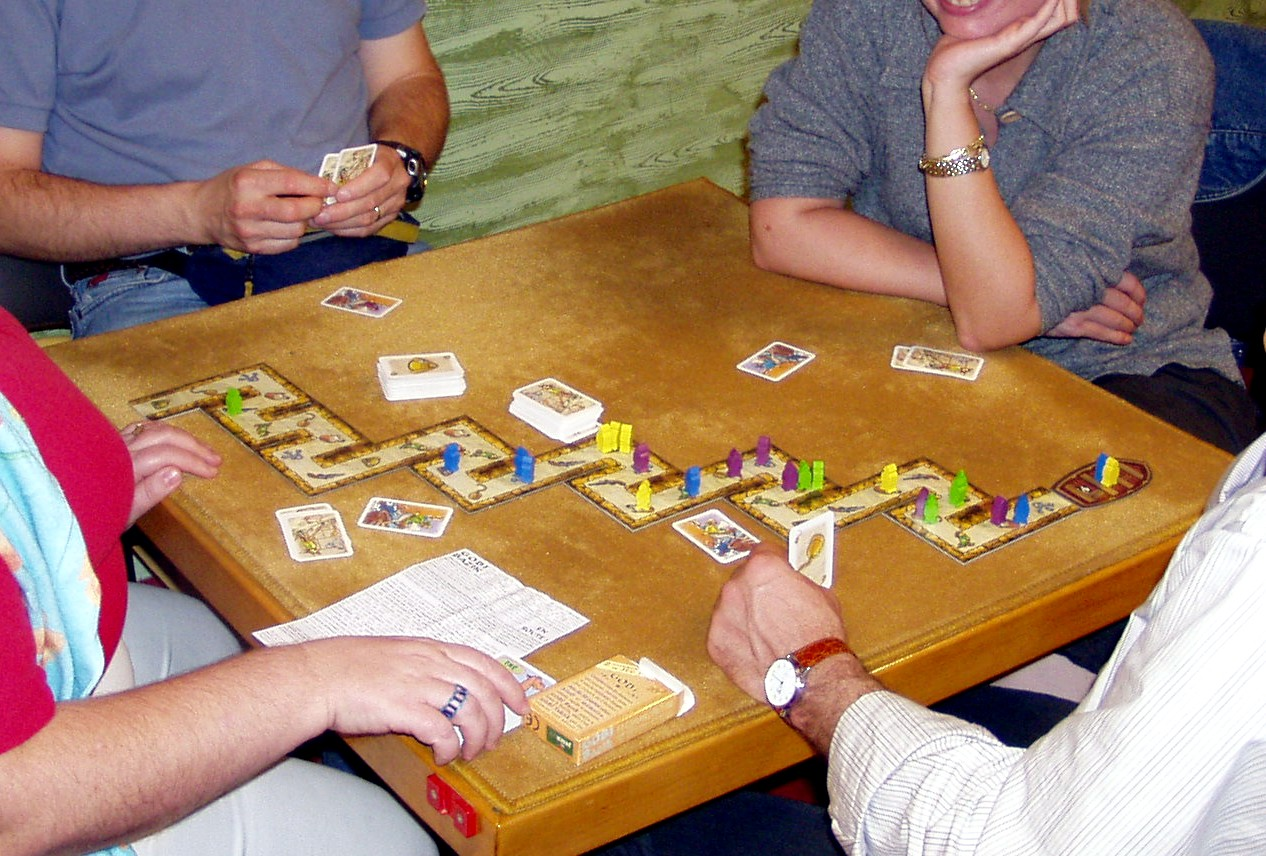
Cartagena's theme is the real 1672 pirate-led jailbreak from the fortress of Cartagena

Examples of themes are:

- Carcassonne – build a medieval landscape complete with walled cities, monasteries, roads, and fields.
- Puerto Rico – develop plantations on the island of Puerto Rico, set in the 18th century.
- Power Grid – expand a power company's network and buy better plants.
- Imperial – as an international investor, influence the politics of pre-World War I European empires.
- Bruxelles 1893 – take the role of an Art Nouveau architect during the late 19th century and try to become the most famous architect in Belgium.

=== Game designer as author ===
Although not relevant to actual play, the name of the game's designer is often prominently mentioned on the box, or at least in the rule book. Top designers enjoy considerable following among enthusiasts of Eurogames. For that reason, the name "designer games" is often offered as a description of the genre. Recently, there has also been a wave of games designed as spin-offs of popular novels, such as the games taking their style from the German bestsellers Der Schwarm and Tintenherz.

== Industry ==
=== Designers ===
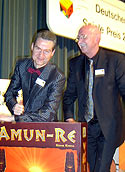
Reiner Knizia and Bernd Brunnhofer at the Deutscher Spielepreis awards at Spiel 2003 in Essen, Germany

Designers of Eurogames include:

- Antoine Bauza is a prolific French designer, creator of 7 Wonders, Tokaido, and Takenoko.
- Bruno Cathala is a French-born game designer, creator of Kingdomino and Five Tribes.
- Vlaada Chvátil is a Czech designer of board games and video games, whose games include Through the Ages: A Story of Civilization, Galaxy Trucker, Space Alert, and Codenames. His rule books are often divided into several "learning scenarios" that gradually introduce players to the rules as they progress through the scenarios.
- Leo Colovini is a designer of Cartagena and Carcassonne: The Discovery.
- Rüdiger Dorn is a German designer who created Istanbul, Karuba, Las Vegas, Luxor, and others.
- Bruno Faidutti is a French designer of Citadels.
- Stefan Feld is a designer particularly of games that make use of dice, which allows players to score points in a variety of ways. He designed games such as Castles of Burgundy, Trajan, Strasbourg, Bruges, and Carpe Diem.
- Friedemann Friese is a German designer, creator of Power Grid and others.
- Mac Gerdts is a German designer of games such as Antike, Imperial, Navegador, and Concordia.
- Reiner Knizia is a German designer who has designed over 600 published games. Recurring mechanisms in his games include auctions (Ra and Modern Art), tile placement (Tigris and Euphrates and Ingenious), and intricate scoring rules (Samurai). He also designed card games such as Lost Cities, Schotten-Totten, and Blue Moon, and the cooperative board game The Lord of the Rings.
- Wolfgang Kramer often works with other game designers. His titles include El Grande, Tikal, Princes of Florence, and Torres. His games often include an action point system and a geometric element.
- Alan R. Moon is a British-born designer whose games often have a railway theme, including the Spiel des Jahres-winning Ticket to Ride and Elfenland.
- Alex Randolph created over 125 games.
- Uwe Rosenberg is a designer of games such as Agricola, Le Havre, Patchwork, and several others.
- Sid Sackson was a prolific American game designer whose games, particularly Acquire, prefigured and strongly influenced the Eurogame genre.
- Michael Schacht is a German designer of Coloretto, Zooloretto, Aquaretto, Valdora, Africana, Web of Power, China, Han, Hansa, Mondo, Mondo Sapiens, Spirits of the Forest, and Coney Island.
- Andreas Seyfarth designed the games Puerto Rico, Manhattan, and, with Karen Seyfarth, Thurn and Taxis.
- Klaus Teuber designed Catan.
- Klaus-Jürgen Wrede is the German game designer of the Carcassonne board game series.

=== Events ===
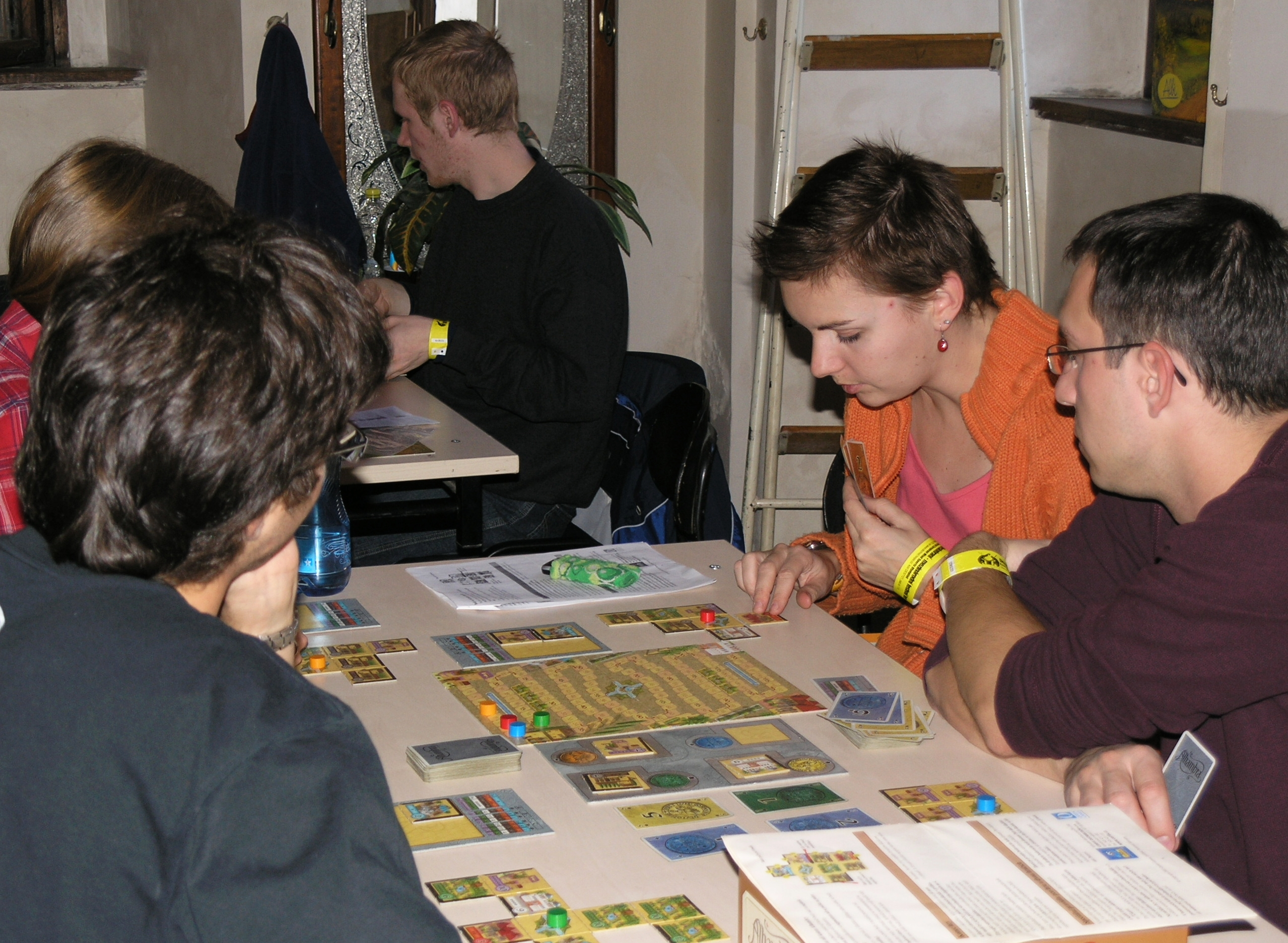
At Deskohraní 2008, players trade currencies and place tiles to build an Andalusian palace in Alhambra.

The Internationale Spieltage, also known as Essen Spiel, or the Essen Games Fair, is the largest non-digital game convention in the world, and the place where the largest number of Eurogames are released each year. Founded in 1983 and held annually in Essen, Germany the fair was founded with the objective of providing a venue for people to meet and play board games, and show gaming as an integral part of German culture.

The "World Boardgaming Championship" is held annually in July in Pennsylvania. It is nine days long and includes tournament tracks of over a hundred games; while traditional wargames are played there, the most popular tournaments are Eurogames and it is generally perceived as a Eurogame-centered event. Attendance is international, though players from the U.S. and Canada predominate.

=== Awards ===
The most prestigious German board game award is the Spiel des Jahres ("Game of the Year"). The award is very family-oriented, with shorter, more approachable games such as Ticket to Ride and Elfenland usually preferred by the award committee. In 2011, the jury responsible for the Spiel des Jahres created the Kennerspiel des Jahres, or connoisseur's game of the year, for more complex games.

The Deutscher Spielepreis ("German game prize") is also awarded to games that are more complex and strategic, such as Puerto Rico. A few games have had broad enough appeal to win both awards: The Settlers of Catan (published 1995), Carcassonne (published 2000), and Dominion (published 2008).

== Influence ==
Xbox Live Arcade has included popular games from the genre, with Catan being released to strong sales on May 13, 2007, Carcassonne being released on June 27, 2007. Lost Cities and Ticket to Ride soon came out. Alhambra was due to follow later in 2007 until being canceled.

The iPhone received versions of The Settlers of Catan and Zooloretto in 2009. Carcassonne was added to the iPhone App Store in June 2010. Later, Ticket to Ride was developed for the iPhone and the iPad, significantly boosting sales of the board game.

Conceptual ideas of Eurogames have been applied for game-based learning in higher education.

== See also ==
- BoardGameGeek – online forum for board gaming hobbyists
- BrettspielWelt – free German online gaming site
- Cooperative board game – board games in which players work together to achieve a common goal
- Going Cardboard – documentary about German-style board games and their community
- List of game designers
