= Kosmos (publisher) =

German publisher

Logo

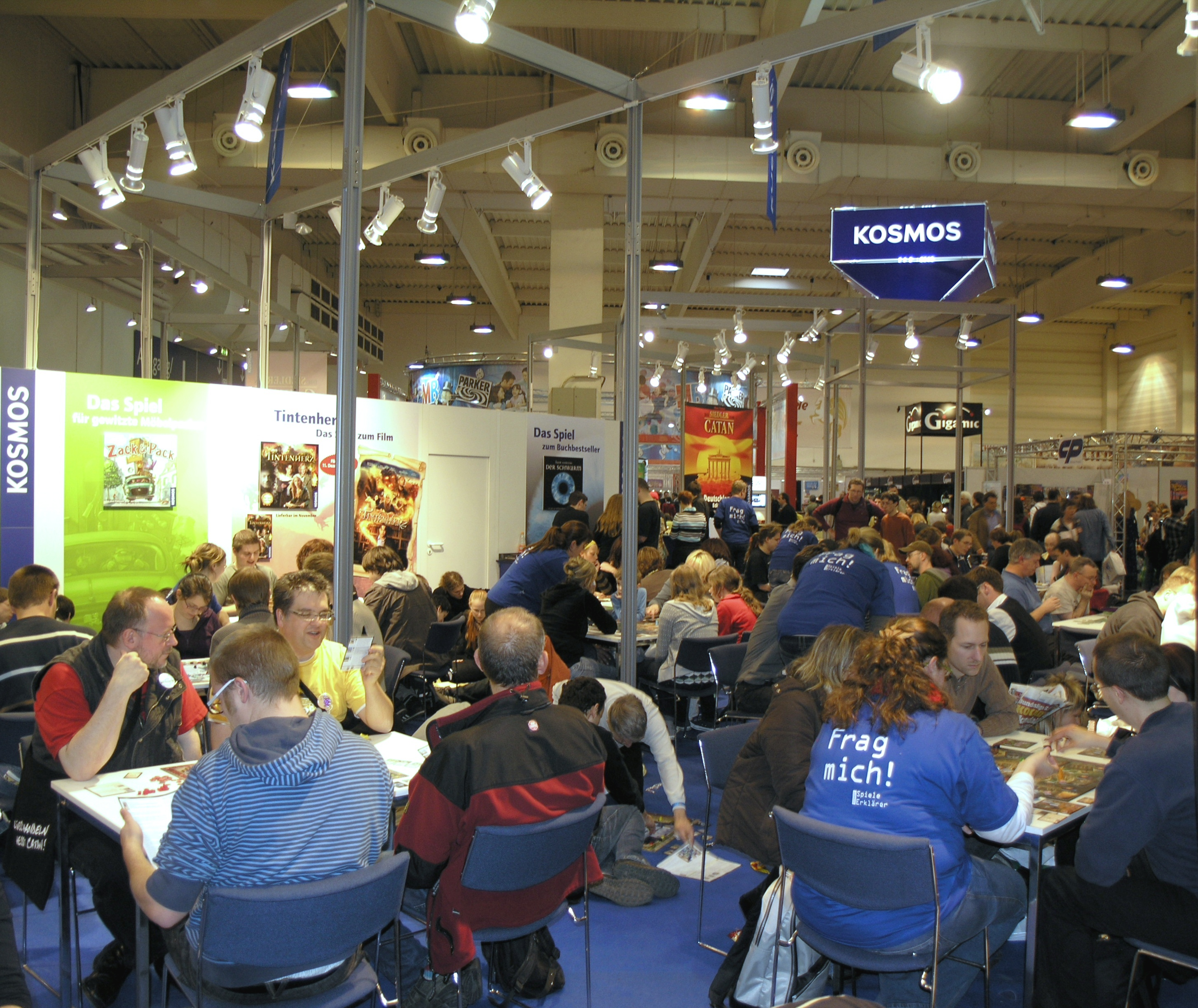
Kosmos at Essen Spiel 2008

Franckh-Kosmos Verlags-GmbH & Co. KG is a media publishing house based in Stuttgart, Germany, founded in 1822 by Johann Friedrich Franckh. In the nineteenth century the company published the fairy tales of Wilhelm Hauff as well as works by Wilhelm Waiblinger and Eduard Mörike.

The "Friends of Nature Club" (Gesellschaft der Naturfreunde) was set up in 1903 in response to booming public interest in science and technology, and by 1912 100,000 members were receiving its monthly magazine "Cosmos" (Kosmos). The company moved into publishing books on popular science topics under the brands Franckh’sche Verlagshandlung and KOSMOS, including successful non-fiction guidebooks by Hanns Günther and Heinz Richter. Children's fiction and Kosmos-branded science experimentation kits were introduced in the 1920s, first in the field of electronics and then chemistry and other areas. In 1937, this effort led to a gold medal at the world exhibition in Paris.

Kosmos's current output includes non-fiction, children's books, science kits and German-style board games. Many of their games are translated into English and published by Thames & Kosmos. Their line of experiment kits and science kits is distributed in North America and the United Kingdom by Thames & Kosmos.

== Notable games ==
- Beowulf: The Legend
- Catan
- Exit: The Game
- Jambo
- Lord of the Rings
- Lost Cities
- The Settlers of Catan
- TwixT
