= Modern Art (game) =

Board game

- Designers: Reiner Knizia
- Publishers: Hans im Glück (Germany); Mayfair Games (U.S.); Κάισσα (Greece); Oink Games (Japan)
- Players: 3-5
- Setup time: 5 minutes
- Playing time: 60 minutes
- Chance: Low
- Age range: 10+
- Skills: Hand management, bidding

Modern Art is an auction game designed by Reiner Knizia and first published in 1992 by Hans im Glück in German. Players represent art dealers, both buying and selling works of art by five different fictional artists. At the end of each round, they sell the paintings they bought back to the "bank". More popular artists' works are worth more, and the value carries over into future rounds. Although the game is played entirely using cards, a board is used for scoring, so the game is sometimes referred to as a board game. 25 versions has been released for the game. It was also recommended for the 1993 Spiel des Jahres.

== Rules ==
Each player is dealt a hand of cards, which represent works of art that the player may offer for sale. Players then take turns putting these cards up for auction. There are several auction formats; the one used is determined by the card offered for sale.

As soon as a fifth work of art by a particular artist is offered for sale, the round ends (the fifth painting is not sold). Players then sell purchased artwork back to the bank — the more paintings of an artist that were sold in the round, the more that artist's paintings are worth. Only the three most popular artists' paintings are worth money; the others are worthless. Ties are broken by a fixed artist precedence. The game has a board to keep track of the value of a given artist's painting. Each artist occupies a column. The leftmost artist is always preferred in case of ties. The number of paintings in the deck reflects this; with the leftmost artist having the fewest paintings, and the rightmost artist having the most paintings.

The game is played in four rounds. In the second, third, and fourth rounds the value of paintings at the end of a round depends not just on how the artist did in that round, but carry over from previous rounds as well. Players are dealt additional cards in the second and third (but not fourth) rounds.

The player with the most money at the end of the fourth round is the winner.

== Reception ==
The game was recommended for the 1993 Spiel des Jahres, with the jury stating that "[the] unusual combination of different auction types makes Modern Art a challenging and varied game experience".
