= 2009 in games =

This page lists board and card games, wargames, miniatures games, and tabletop role-playing games published in 2009. For video games, see 2009 in video games.

== Games released or invented in 2009 ==
- Aksharit
- All Things Zombie
- Axis & Allies: Pacific 1940
- Carcassonne: Wheel of Fortune
- Castle Panic
- Connect 4x4
- Dominion: Intrigue
- Dominion: Seaside
- Dungeon Lords
- Endeavor
- Ex illis
- Fiasco
- Finca
- FITS (board game)
- Martian Fluxx
- Granada
- (The) Green Game
- Grind
- Hansa Teutonica
- Havana
- Imperial 2030
- Jaipur
- København
- Logo Board Game
- The Magic Labyrinth
- Malifaux
- Monopoly City
- Murus Gallicus
- My First Carcassonne
- Mythgardia
- Reminiscing:21st Century Edition
- Sector 41
- Through the Ages: A Story of Civilization
- Thunderstone
- Words with Friends
- World War IV: One World, One King
- The Sims 3
- MySims Racing
- MySims Party
- MySims Agents

== Game awards given in 2009 ==
- Mensa Select: Cornerstone, Dominion, Marrekech, Stratum, Tic-Tac-Ku
- Spiel des Jahres: Dominion
- Games: Small World
- Maria won the Spiel Portugal Jogo do Ano.

== Significant game-related events in 2009 ==
- Mattel, Inc. purchased Sekkoia SAS, makers of Blokus, Blokus Trigon, Blokus 3D, Blokus Duo, and Blokus Giant for an undisclosed sum.

== Deaths ==
Date	Name	Age	Notability
March 13	Keith Herber	60	RPG designer
April 7	Dave Arneson	61	co-creator of Dungeons & Dragons
June 9	Dave Simons	54	Comics artist who also drew for Dungeons & Dragons
September 6	David J. Ritchie	58	RPG designer
October 14	Wilf K. Backhaus	62	RPG designer, co-creator of Chivalry & Sorcery
November 7	Gene D. Cohen	65	Psychiatrist who also created therapeutic board games
November 16	Edward Woodward	79	English actor who hosted the Battleground wargaming TV series in 1978
November 17	Richard Snider	56	RPG designer, creator of Powers & Perils

== See also ==
- List of game manufacturers
- 2009 in video games
