= Carcassonne: The City =

Board game

Carcassonne: The City is a German board game for two to four players. As a member of the Carcassonne family of games, it is created by Klaus-Jürgen Wrede and distributed by Hans im Glück in German and Rio Grande Games in English. Like other Carcassonne games, the objective of the game is to score points based on placement of the tiles. However, The City also adds city walls and towers, which can inhibit the growth of the playing field in a certain direction. The City is packaged in a "deluxe" manner: the box itself is made from wood, as are the parts for the city walls, followers, and towers.

The City is built around the building of Carcassonne itself (the city itself had previously been only represented in any Carcassonne game in The Count of Carcassonne).

== Rules ==
At the start of the game, the 75 tiles are divided into three piles, one each of 30, 25, and 20 tiles—players initially draw from the pile of 30, and then the piles of 25 and 20, the latter two of which the city walls are introduced. There are also 12 towers, which are split equally among the players.

Like other Carcassonne games, each player at the start of their turn must draw and place a tile so that they are adjacent to other tiles and such that the features connect with each other. Unlike Carcassonne (but like Carcassonne: The Castle) only roads need to be contiguous: residential areas and markets (serving as fields and cities in The City, respectively) need not be connected.

After a tile is placed, a player may choose to place a follower onto the newly placed tile. Like other games, followers claim a feature of a tile, and may not be placed in features where another follower is present. It is entirely possible to place followers in such a way that two or more followers share a feature. Players are also advised to lay their followers on residential areas lying down, as they are only scored at the end of the game.

Features are considered complete if the feature in question is unable to be expanded—roads when they reach intersections, city walls, or form a closed loop, and markets and residential areas by the presence of each other or by roads or walls. If markets or roads are completed by the placement of tiles, they are then immediately scored. Like other Carcassonne games, the player(s) with the majority of followers on a completed feature score the full number of points—all others having a claim to the feature score nothing. Roads are worth two points per tile for roads of at least four tiles, and one point per tile for shorter ones, while markets score one point per tile, multiplied by the number of distinct goods that are sold therein (there are three distinct types of goods in markets). As in other Carcassonne games, followers on completed features are returned to their owners, which can then be reused.

A noticeable difference between The City and other Carcassonne games, followers may not be placed on just-completed features.

=== City Walls ===
City walls enter play once the first pile is exhausted. Whenever a feature is scored, walls are added to the board. The first player to score after the first pile is exhausted places the city gate next to any tile, and thereafter all players must place a wall segment such that it is adjacent to a tile and to other wall segments (or the city gate). Wall segments prevent tiles to be placed beyond the wall, and also serve to complete features. After the second pile is exhausted, each player places two wall segments. In a two-player game, two wall segments are placed instead of one after the first pile is exhausted, and four wall segments are placed instead of two after the second pile is exhausted.

A player may choose to place a follower on a wall segment whenever it is placed: however, a follower cannot be placed on a wall segment if there is another follower directly opposite. Followers can, however, be placed in such a way that they are opposite each other through the filling in of intermediate spaces. At the end of wall building, the player on move may choose to build a tower at either end of the wall; this immediately scores one point for each wall segment between the new tower and the previous tower along the wall (or between the tower and the city gate, if there is no intervening tower).

Other features may be completed by placement of wall segments, and they are scored at that time. This does not, however, cause new walls to be built. Completed roads or markets that do not score due to the absence of followers do not cause walls to be added to the city.

=== Scoring ===
The game is complete whenever either all wall segments or all tiles are used, or alternatively whenever the two ends of the city wall are within five walls of each other. At this point the entire city is considered to be walled in, and any features that are completed in this manner are scored. All other followers on incomplete roads and markets (caused from holes in the city itself) are removed, and are not scored.

At this time the residential areas and followers on walls are scored: residential areas, complete or otherwise, score two points for each adjacent market for the player(s) with the most followers. Followers on walls score for each public or historic building in the row or column of tiles extending from their wall section: two points for public buildings and three for historic buildings.

The player with the most points at the end of scoring wins the game.

== Reviews ==
- Pyramid
