= Carcassonne: Hunters and Gatherers =

German-style board game

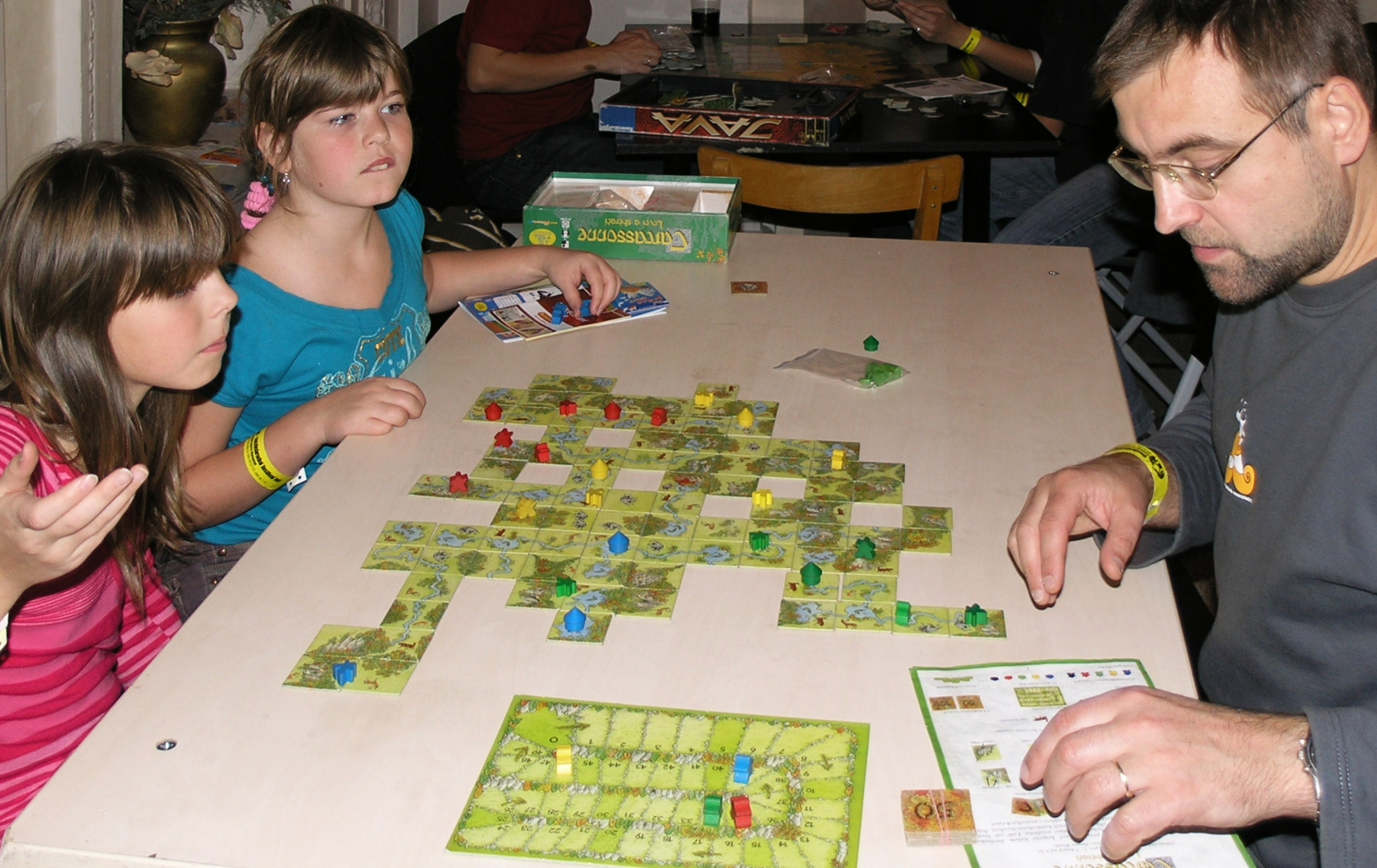
Carcassonne: Hunters and Gatherers

Carcassonne: Hunters and Gatherers is a German-style board game. It is a member of the Carcassonne family of board games, and was developed by Klaus-Jürgen Wrede. It was first published in 2002, in German by Hans im Glück, and in English by Rio Grande Games. In 2015, the English Second Edition was published by Z-Man Games.

Carcassonne: Hunters and Gatherers is set in the countryside near the French city of Carcassonne, before the establishment of its famed city walls. Like the original game it is based on, the objective of the game is to score points through judicious placement of terrain tiles and followers (colloquially referred to as meeples).

The Scout portion of the King and Scout expansion to Carcassonne provides an expansion to this game.

== Gameplay ==
Carcassonne: Hunters and Gatherers begins with a single tile on the table, and ends when all of the 78 tiles have been placed. At the start of each turn, a player takes an unplaced tile at random and places it adjacent to one or more already placed tiles such that the terrain features (forest, river, and meadow) on the touching tiles match; meadow to meadow, forest to forest, and river to river. This results in those matching features being extended. If a player draws a tile that cannot be placed, they must discard the tile from the game and choose a different tile.

After placing a tile, the player may place one of their followers on a terrain feature of that tile, thus claiming ownership of that feature. A follower placed on a meadow is called a Hunter. A follower placed in a forest is called a Gatherer. A follower placed on a river is called a Fisher. A player may place a follower only if no other followers have claimed that instance of the feature on a connecting tile. It is possible that followers may share the same feature if the placement of a tile joins two features of the same type, each of which already has a follower on it. When a river or forest is completed, points are scored (see Scoring, below), and any followers are taken off those features for re-use on later turns. Followers placed in a meadow are not returned to the player, and the meadow is not scored until the end of the game. To help distinguish a Hunter (in the meadow) from Gatherers and Fishers, the Hunters are placed on their side, whereas the Gatherers and Fishers are placed standing up.

If a completed forest contains a gold nugget, the player completing the forest (by placing the tile) is awarded a bonus turn, and draws a random tile from a separate pile of a dozen bonus tiles. After playing the tile, the player may score again in the normal fashion if any rivers or forests are completed. Note that "chain reactions" are not permitted; only one bonus tile may be played per turn. The player playing the bonus tile, as with normal tiles, may choose to place a follower on a feature of that bonus tile.

Each player has seven followers of a colour; two fishing huts and five ordinary followers. Ordinary followers may be placed on any terrain feature (i.e. meadow, forest or river) as described above. Fishing huts may only be placed on a river segment or lake. Doing so claims ownership of the entire system of rivers (i.e. all bodies of water connected to the segment on which the hut is placed). Huts and ordinary followers do not influence each other's placement; thus a player may place a hut on a river in which any player already has an ordinary follower. Similarly, a player may place an ordinary follower on a river in which any player already has a hut. A hut may not be placed on a river system which already has a hut, but (as with forests, meadows and rivers), it is possible that two or more huts may share the same river system if the placement of a tile joins two or river systems, each of which already had a hut on it.

The game is completed when the final (ordinary) tile is placed. The player with the most points after a final round of scoring wins the game.

== Scoring ==
Points are scored both during the game, and in a final scoring after the last tile is placed.

Points are scored during the game for completion of rivers and forests. Only the player(s) with the majority of followers in a given feature score points for that completed feature, with all tied players receiving the full number of points if a tie exists.

A river is complete when there is a lake or spring at each end, or when it forms a closed loop. Players with a follower on a completed river score one point for each river segment plus one point for each fish in the lake(s) that may be at each end of the river.

Forests are complete when they are surrounded on all sides by meadow. Forests are scored at the rate of two points per segment. Some tiles have more than one segment of forest. It is thus possible for a single tile to contribute more than two points in the scoring of a forest. An additional two points are awarded for each mushroom patch located within a completed forest.

The followers on completed rivers and forests are removed and returned to the players' supplies. These followers may then be reused in subsequent turns.

At the end of the game, any followers on incomplete rivers or forests are removed, but no points are awarded. The final scoring is then conducted, which involves the scoring of meadows and huts. Huts award the player one point for each fish in the entire river system. River systems do not need to be completed to be scored. Meadows, which contain various animals, will score the player points for the animals that are contained therein, regardless of whether the meadow is complete or not. There are three types of animals that contribute points to the scoring of a meadow, being deer, aurochs, and mammoths, and they are worth two points each. However, each tiger in the meadow will negate the scoring of a single deer (but not aurochs or mammoth). Any tigers in excess of the number of deer will not adversely affect the scoring for a meadow. The bonus tile with burning grass, if placed in the meadow, negates the effect of the tigers, allowing all deer in the meadow to be scored. Green discs are provided with the game to aid in this element of scoring. There is also a bonus tile containing a shrine. If a player has a follower on the shrine, only that player scores for the meadow, regardless of the number of followers each player may have in the meadow.

== Scout expansion ==
When playing with the Scout expansion, each player also takes a special tile at the beginning of the game from a set of five (in a two-player game, each player takes two). Four of these five tiles are special land tiles that can be played in lieu of drawing a tile that turn. However, when played a player must place a follower (or a hut with Agriculture) on the tile that will remain there during the rest of the game. These tiles also grant an ability to the player who plays the special tile:

- The Scout allows a player to refuse the first tile drawn and draw another tile. This privilege can be used for bonus tiles so long as the ability was not used in the initial draw, and is not considered to be used when a player is forced to redraw. The follower on the scout is considered to be part of the forest on the tile, but is not removed when the forest is completed.
- The Hunter on Bridge allows the follower there to count in the scoring of the meadows on both sides of the river that the bridge straddles. One side of the river also contains a bear, worth two points as with other animals.
- The Dug-out allows the owner to score whenever any river in the system is completed -- the player receives as many points as the lake with the largest number of fish in the system. The follower is considered to be part of a river extending from the lake on the tile, but is not removed when the river is completed.
- The player with the Agriculture scores one point for each tile in the meadow at the end of the game. As a river runs through the tile, the player may choose to place a hut instead of a follower, following normal rules.

The fifth tile, the Shaman, allows a player to remove one of their own followers (not huts) each turn.

== Reviews ==
- Pyramid
