= My First Carcassonne =

My First Carcassonne (formerly known as The Kids of Carcassonne) is a tile-laying German-style board game developed by Marco Teubner. It is a game in the Carcassonne series, published by Hans im Glück in Germany and Z-Man Games in North America. My First Carcassonne is the third Carcassonne spin-off, following Carcassonne: The Castle and Carcassonne: The Discovery. (Spin-offs are designed by someone other than series creator Klaus-Jürgen Wrede; My First Carcassonne is designed by Teubner, with both Teubner and Wrede credited on the box.)

Based like the main game on the historical walled city of Carcassonne, it centres on a group of children celebrating a national holiday by catching livestock.

== Gameplay ==
The game consists of eight followers given to each player and 36 large tiles. At the start of the game, one tile is randomly selected to be the starting tile. On each player's turn, that player takes one of the remaining tiles and places it adjacent to a tile already in play, ensuring the roads on each tile are contiguous. Each tile contains figures of various colors on the roads; when a road is completed, players place their followers on the figures of the corresponding color on the newly completed road.

The winner is the player who first places all of their followers. In the case that all 36 tiles are played without anyone placing all eight followers, the winner is the player who has placed the most followers.
