= New World: A Carcassonne Game =

New World: A Carcassonne Game is a German-style board game in the Carcassonne series. The game was created by series creator Klaus-Jurgen Wrede, and published by Hans im Gluck in and Rio Grande Games in English.

Unlike other games in the Carcassonne series, this game revolves around the settlement of the New World.

== Gameplay ==
The game consists of a game board showing the United States East Coast, from Plymouth, Massachusetts in the north and Jamestown, Virginia in the south, as well as a series of tiles. Players must, on their turn, place a new tile adjacent to an existing tile or the game board, so that the features on the tile are contiguous. A player may also optionally place a follower on the board, as in Carcassonne, and claim one of their features. Followers may be either "shopkeepers" in the towns, "robbers" on trails, "trappers" on plains, or "farmers" on farms; however, players may not place a follower on a feature for which there is another follower (however, it is possible for features to be shared, if two separate features are later joined by new tiles).

When a town, trail, or farm is completed (towns when they are completely enclosed by town walls and surrounded by plains on all sides, trails when they form a closed loop or both ends terminate, and farms when the eight spaces surrounding the tile are occupied), scoring occurs. The player with the most followers on these features earns the full number of points; if there is a tie for the most, all tied players receive the full scoring value. Towns score two points per tile, and score two more points for each flag within the town boundaries. Trails score one point per tile, and two additional points for each trading post along the trail. Farms score 9 points, representing the tile itself and the eight surrounding ones. Thereafter, all the followers on the feature are removed from the board and given back to their owners.

Plains do not score until the end of the game; consequently any followers there must remain until the end of the game.

In addition, New World has a unique mechanic to the Carcassonne series, called the surveyors. Surveyors are moved after a feature is scored, moving one column towards the west each time. There are two surveyors in the game, and they must "keep pace" with each other: if one surveyor is further west of the other, the trailing surveyor must be moved to catch up to the leading one when the next feature is scored. When a feature is scored, if the follower claiming that feature is in the same column as a surveyor, the player gets four extra points, if the other surveyor is in the same column, the player will score four more points for a total possible bonus of 8 points. Furthermore, any followers, except those on plains, behind the trailing surveyor are removed from the board and returned to their owners.

When all the tiles are placed (and any completed features caused by the placement of the last tile are scored), the game ends. The surveyors are removed from the board, and any remaining incomplete features are scored. Trails score as if they were completed, while towns score one point per tile, with one point per flag in each city. Farms score one point for the farm tile and one point per surrounding tile. Finally, plains are scored. Plains score one point for each animal shown in the tiles making up the plain.

The winner is the player with the most points.

== Reviews ==
- Pyramid
