= Carcassonne – Tiles & Tactics =

2017 video game

- Developer: Frima Studio
- Publisher: Twin Sails Interactive
- Platforms: Android; Windows; Nintendo Switch; iOS
- Release: Win, Android; WW: November 29, 2017; Switch; WW: December 6, 2018; iOS; WW: March 30, 2020
- Genre: Digital tabletop
- Modes: Single-player, multiplayer

Carcassonne – Tiles & Tactics is a digital adaptation of Carcassonne developed by Frima Studio and published by Twin Sails Interactive.

== Gameplay ==
Like the board game, players compete to score points by placing random tiles on a digital tabletop and populating them with meeple, stylized tokens that resemble people. Tiles represent different landscape features, such as roads, fields, and churches, each of which are worth different amounts of points when populated.

== Development ==
Developer Frima Studio is based in Quebec. Twin Sails Interactive released Carcassonne – Tiles & Tactics for Windows and Android on November 29, 2017, and for Switch on December 6, 2018. It was released for iOS on March 30, 2020, after replacing a previous adaptation in Apple's App Store.

== Reception ==
Carcassonne – Tiles & Tactics received mixed reviews on Metacritic. Nintendo Life praised the gameplay, but they disliked the lack of online multiplayer and what they felt was sluggish AI on the Switch. Nintendo World Report also criticized the lack of online muiltiplayer, and they disliked the user interface. Both sites said the Switch port was inferior to others but said Switch players may still enjoy it. Pocket Gamer said the Android version is "polished and feature-packed", though they disliked waiting in an online lobby for multiplayer games to fill up.
