= Russian Railroads =

German board game

- Box cover
- Designers: Helmut Ohley and Leonhard Orgler
- Publishers: Hans im Glück (German} Z-Man Games (English)
- Players: 2 to 4
- Setup time: 5–10 minutes
- Playing time: 30–60 minutes per player
- Chance: Low (Cards)
- Skills: Economic management, Resource management, Strategic thought

Russian Railroads is a tile-based Euro-style board game for 2 to 4 players by Helmut Ohley and Leonhard Orgler. The game was published in 2013 by Hans im Glück Verlag. It is based on the worker placement principle, in which players can in turn distribute their available workforce in open fields in order to gain resources or other benefits. This gameplay is also used in other games of the publishing house, such as Stone Age or Egizia.

== Theme and goal of the game ==
In Russian Railroads, the players assume the roles of railway magnate in the late empire. By employing workers, building materials can be generated, new workers recruited, and gifted engineers hired. The goal of the game is to earn more victory points by building more railroad tracks than any other player.

== Expansions ==
In addition to the main game, the publisher released three expansions. The first expansion The New Engineers contains six new tiles and four new engineers. On the back there is an extension to Stone Age. The second extension has a broader scope and is called German Railroads. In addition to new engineer cards and game tiles, there is a new board on which German rail lines must be built. The basic rules are extended by the "carbon module" and a solo variant. The expansion American Railroads appeared with American routes and stock market.

== Awards ==
- Deutscher Spiele Preis 2014 – 1st Place
- International Gamers Awards 2014 Multiplayer category – Winner
- Spielehit für Experten 2014 – Winner
- Meeples’ Choice Award 2013 – Winner
- Dice Tower 2013 – Best Strategy Game
- Spielevater Hit 2014 – Winner
- Swiss Gamers Award 2013 – 3rd Place
- Nederlandse Spellenprijs – Nomination
- Gouden Ludo 2014 – Nomination
- Spiel Portugals Jogo do Ano 2014 – Nomination
- Spiel des Jahres 2014 – Recommended

== Gallery ==
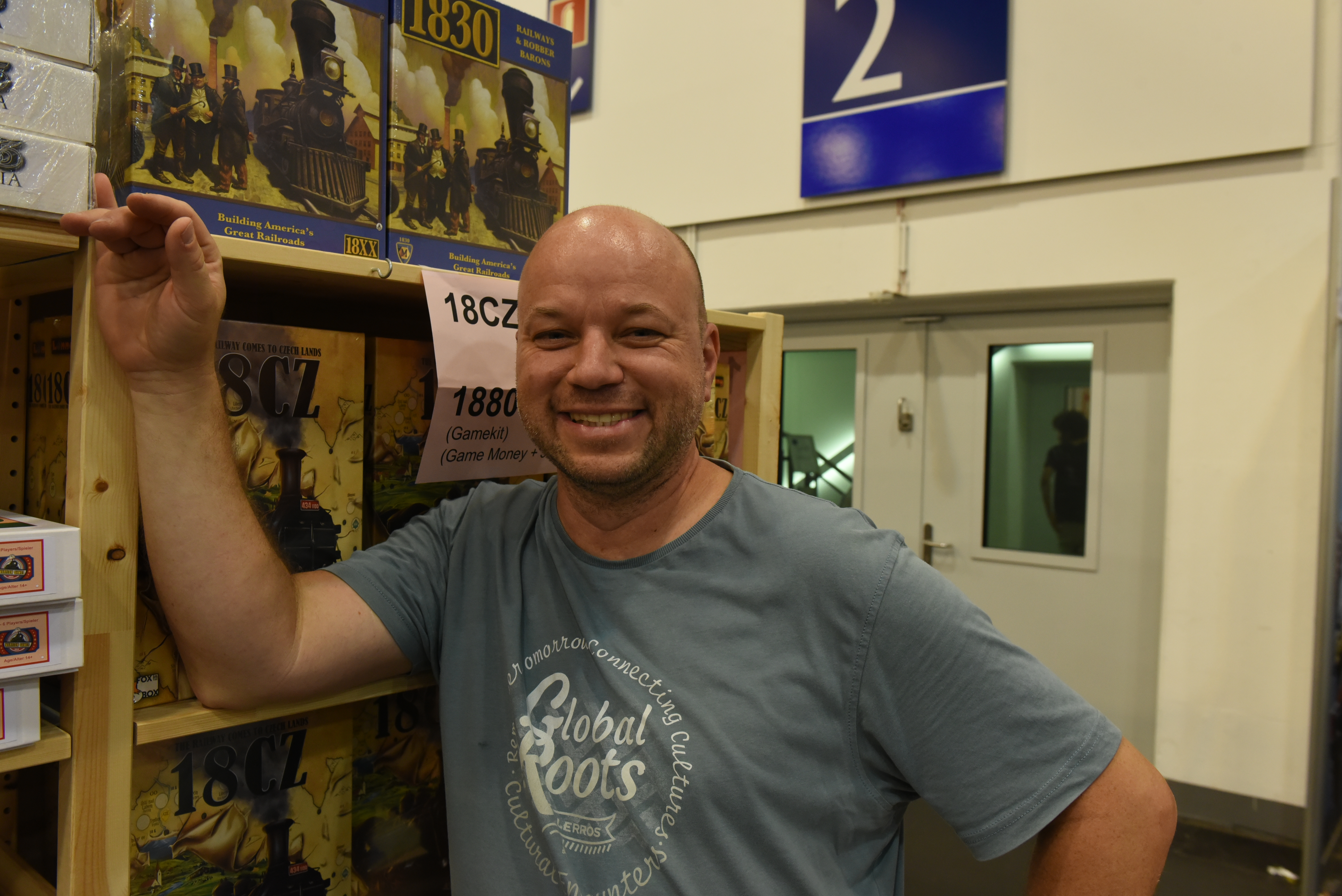
The game designer Leonhard Orgler
