= Carcassonne: Wheel of Fortune =

Carcassonne: Wheel of Fortune 2009 is a tile-based German-style board game developed by Klaus-Jürgen Wrede and distributed by Hans im Glück in German and Rio Grande Games in English. It is considered a game in the Carcassonne series, and is considered both as a standalone game as well as an expansion set to Carcassonne.

== Gameplay ==
As Wheel of Fortune is a "standalone expansion" of Carcassonne, Wheel of Fortune plays similarly to Carcassonne but includes new mechanics related to the included 4-tile by 4-tile "Wheel of Fortune" (aka "Schicksalsrad" or "Wheel of Fate") mega-tile. Wheel of Fortune includes 63 base tiles from the 2000 version of Carcassonne with certain tiles having additional markings significant to this expansion. The original starting tile is replaced by the large Wheel tile with the remaining 9 tiles coming from other expansions, 6 from Inns & Cathedrals, 1 from Traders & Builders and 2 from King & Scout.

The new feature of Wheel of Fortune is the namesake Wheel, which takes the place of the starting tile by including road, field, and city sections on its edges. The wheel consists of 5 sections with 9 "crown spaces", and players, in place of placing followers on the tile they just played, may place tiles on "crown spaces" of the wheel with each section having one or two "crown spaces" along the rim. In addition, a pig-shaped marker begins on the wheel, and is moved whenever a tiles with certain markings are drawn. When these tiles are drawn, the marker is advanced clockwise along the wheel the number of spaces stated on the tile. The space on the wheel is resolved, and followers on the rim of the particular space are scored, before the tile is placed. Wheel effects include scoring by all players for certain types of followers (including unplayed followers), scoring by only the player on move, or the removal of a follower on the board (except on the wheel) by all players. Followers on the wheel score three points, except when there is only one follower on a wheel space that has two spaces on the rim, in which the follower scores six points. Followers on the wheel at the end of the game are not worth any points. Once scored, followers on the wheel are returned to their owners.

Wheel of Fortune is fully compatible with Carcassonne and its expansions – when combined with Carcassonne, only one set of follower pieces is used as the original 40 pieces of 5 colors are provided in both boxes. Wheel of Fortune tiles are differentiated from Carcassonne tiles with a distinct Wheel logo on every tile, as with most other Carcassonne expansions.

Carcassonne: Wheel of Fortune was also packaged and released as part of Carcassonne Big Box 5 in 2014 but is not included with either version of Carcassonne Big Box 6 (blue/cyan in 2017 or beige & green in 2021).
