= Carcassonne (board game) =

2000 board game

- 3rd Edition (2022) box cover of Carcassonne
- Designers: Klaus-Jürgen Wrede
- Publishers: Hans im Glück (Germany); Z-Man Games (UK, US); 999 Games (Netherlands); Фантасмагория (Bulgaria); Lautapelit.fi (Finland); Κάισσα (Greece); Brain Games (Estonia, Latvia, Lithuania); メビウスゲームズ (Japan); Giochi Uniti (Italy); Piatnik Budapest Kft. (Hungary); Devir (Spain, Latin America, Portugal); MINDOK (Czech Republic, Poland, Slovakia); Grow (Brazil); Feelindigo (Ukraine); Lineart (Romania); Möbius Games (Japan); Swan Panasia (Taiwan, Thailand); Rio Grande Games (Sweden); Hobby World (Russia); NeoTroy Games (Turkey)
- Publication: 2000; 26 years ago
- Genres: Tile-based game; Eurogame
- Players: 2–5 (6–8 with expansion)
- Setup time: 1–5 minutes
- Playing time: 30–90 minutes
- Chance: Medium

Related games
- Small World, Ticket to Ride, 7 Wonders, Castles of Mad King Ludwig, Castles of Burgundy

Carcassonne (/ˌkɑːrkəˈsɒn/) is a tile-based Eurogame for two to five players, designed by Klaus-Jürgen Wrede and published in 2000 by Hans im Glück in German and by Rio Grande Games (until 2012) and Z-Man Games (currently) in English. It received the Spiel des Jahres and the Deutscher Spiele Preis awards in 2001.

It is named after the medieval fortified town of Carcassonne in southern France, famed for its city walls. The game has spawned many expansions and spin-offs, and several PC, console, and mobile versions. A new edition, with updated artwork on the tiles and the box, was released in 2014.

== Gameplay ==
	C	🡦
R		R
🡤	F	🡧

The CRFR starting tile has three features: a single city edge, a straight road parallel to that edge, and the field occupying the remainder; tile notation describes the features on each edge, clockwise from the north.

The game board is a medieval landscape built by the players as the game progresses. The game starts with a single specific terrain tile face up and 71 others shuffled face down for the players to draw from. Each player's turn consists of three distinct phases:

1. Draw and place a terrain tile
2. Station a follower on the newly placed tile (optional)
3. Score completed feature(s) (if relevant)

To start each turn, a player draws a new terrain tile and places it adjacent to tiles that are already face up. The new tile must be placed in a way that extends terrain features on the tiles it touches: roads must connect to roads, fields to fields, and cities to cities. Connections are made across adjacent edges only; corners do not connect. A cloister tile may be placed adjacent to another cloister tile, as there are no connecting features. If the newly drawn tile cannot be placed anywhere legally, the players may choose to remove the tile from the game, or return it to the draw pile.

After placing each newly drawn tile, the placing player may opt to station a marker (called a "follower" or "meeple") on a terrain feature (i.e., a road, city, cloister, or field) of that newly placed tile to claim control of it. However, if the feature is connected to a feature already claimed by another player, the follower cannot be stationed on that feature. When stationing a follower, the marker is placed upright on the feature to claim that feature, except for a field, where the follower is laid down instead to emphasize that fields are not scored until the end of the game; the follower's role depends on the feature claimed, changing from thief/highwayman (road) to knight (city), monk (cloister or monastery), or farmer (field). It is possible for terrain features to become "shared" by opposing players when tile(s) are placed in subsequent turns that connect previously unconnected features. For example, two separate fields (each with a follower/farmer) can become connected into a single field subsequently by a newly placed terrain tile.

If any feature (except a field) is completed during a player's turn, the score for the completed feature is counted for the player that controls that feature; after scoring, the controlling "meeple" is removed from the board and returned to the player's stock. Each player has eight followers; since one is used to keep track of the player's score, only seven can be in play at any moment.

The game ends when the last tile has been placed. At that time, all incomplete features (including fields) score points for the players with the most followers on them. The player with the most points wins the game.

=== Scoring ===
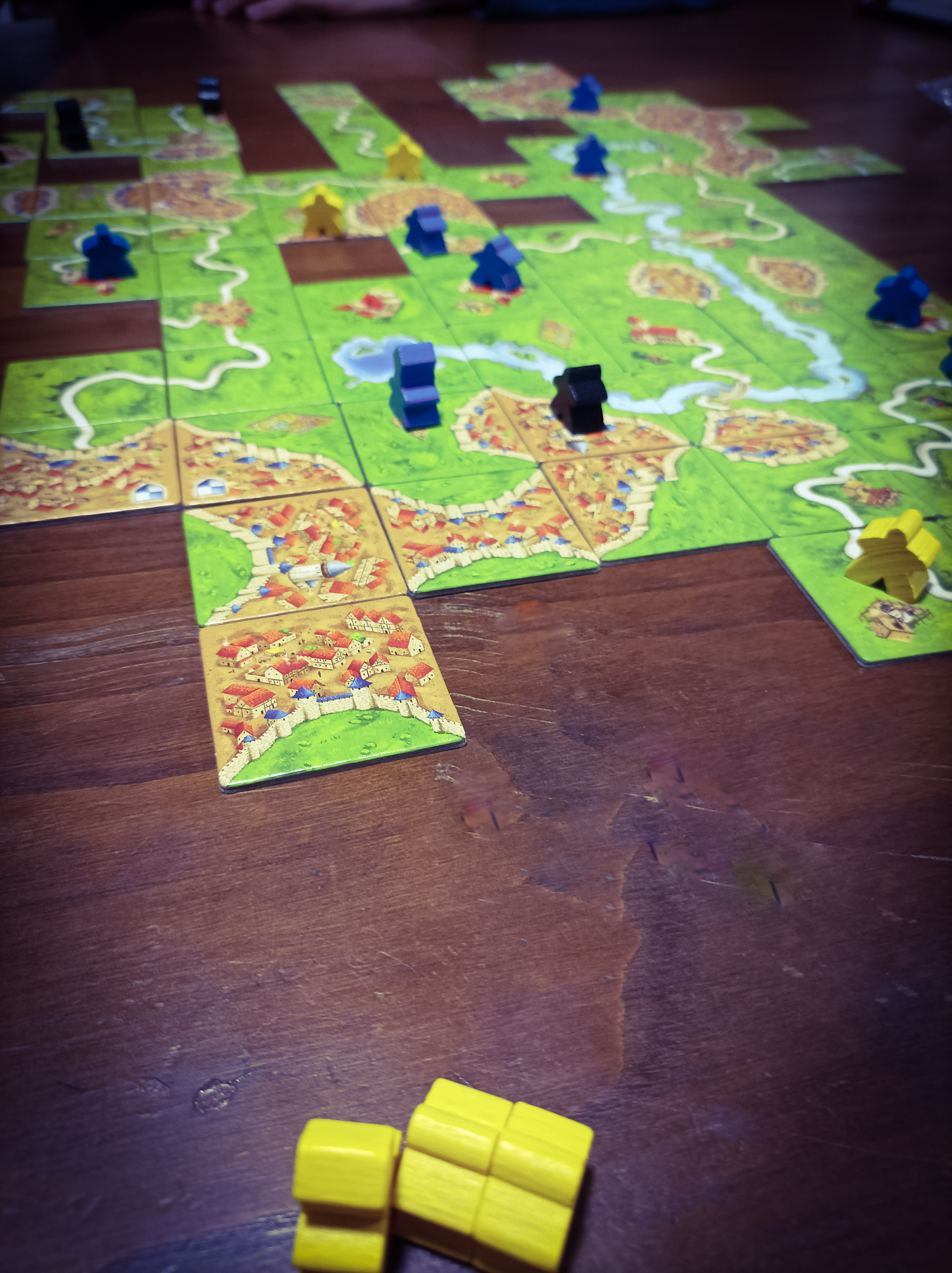

During each player's turn, completed cities, cloisters, and roads (but not fields) are scored before that player's turn ends. A player may complete a feature by drawing and placing a tile, claim it by stationing a follower on the newly placed tile, and receive the score for completing it all in the same turn, but the sequence of that turn means the player cannot redeploy the follower after it is returned to their stock. The stationing phase of the turn was completed by claiming the completed feature.

Cities are completed when they contain no unfinished edges from which they may be expanded, roads are similarly completed when they have closed both ends or form a loop, and cloisters are completed when surrounded by eight tiles. Points are awarded to the players with the most followers in a feature. If there is a tie for the most followers in any given feature, all of the tied players are awarded the full number of points. Once a city, cloister, or road feature is scored, all of the followers in that feature are returned to their owners. In general (see table), points are awarded for the number of tiles covered by a feature; a completed cloister scores nine points for the cloister plus eight neighboring tiles.

At the end of the game, when there are no tiles remaining, fields and all other claimed but incomplete features are scored. The score of each field is based on the number of completed cities that field touches. It is possible for a field to be completely enclosed by a road without touching any completed cities, or a field can touch only incomplete cities, in which case those fields will score no points.

Feature	Completed during play	Game end
City	2 points per tile + 2 points per pennant	1 point per tile + 1 point per pennant
Road	1 point per tile	
Cloister	1 point + 1 point for each of the surrounding tiles	
Fields	(Not scored)	3 points for each completed city bordering the field.

==== Older editions ====
There are two older editions of Carcassonne, differing in scoring of cities and fields. The current scoring rules were introduced in the German version in 2004, but until 2008, the first edition scoring rules were still included with the English releases of Carcassonne. Third edition rules are now included with all editions (including the Xbox 360 and travel versions), and are assumed by all expansions in all languages.

In the first and second editions of the game, completed cities covering just two tiles scored two points (one per tile) and one extra point for every pennant that resides in the city. (Note: The part of the rule involving pennants was redundant, as it is impossible to have a two-tile completed city with pennants.) This exception is removed from the third edition, in which there is no difference between "small" two-tile cities and cities of larger size.

The greatest divergence in scoring rules between the editions of Carcassonne is in scoring for fields. In the first edition, fields were considered from the point of view of the cities. The player(s) with the greatest number of farmer/followers adjacent to a city were awarded four points for that city. Thus, followers from different fields contributed to the scoring for a city, and followers on a field may contribute to the scoring for multiple cities. The second edition considered different fields separately – for each field, the players with the greatest number of followers in a field scored three points for each city adjacent to the field, although points were only scored once for any given city. The third edition removes these exceptions and brings field scoring in line with the scoring of other features.

=== Examples ===
In-turn completion scoring examples
Illustration				Feature	Score	Notes
	A	B	C	Road	3	Road spans three tiles [A1]—[B1]—[C1] (three points); the road terminates in villages at both ends, [A1] and [C1]. Because corners do not connect, there are two distinct incomplete cities on the north edges of [B1] and [C1], respectively. In addition, there are four fields: 1. West half of [A1]; 2. NE corner of [A1], connected to N half of [B1] and N half of [C1]; 3. SE corner of [A1], connected to S half of [B1] and SW corner of [C1]; 4. SE corner of [C1]
1				Road	3	Road spans three tiles [A1]—[B1]—[C1] (three points); the road terminates in villages at both ends, [A1] and [C1]. Because corners do not connect, there are two distinct incomplete cities on the north edges of [B1] and [C1], respectively. In addition, there are four fields: 1. West half of [A1]; 2. NE corner of [A1], connected to N half of [B1] and N half of [C1]; 3. SE corner of [A1], connected to S half of [B1] and SW corner of [C1]; 4. SE corner of [C1]
	A	B	C	City	14	The completed city covers five tiles at [C1]*[A2]*[B2]*[C2]*[B3] = ten points; it encloses two pennants at [B2] and [C2] = four points. There are six fields in this example, with the largest that touches the completed city worth three points or more, depending on whether the incomplete city on the W edge of [A3] is completed by the end of the game.
1				City	14	The completed city covers five tiles at [C1]*[A2]*[B2]*[C2]*[B3] = ten points; it encloses two pennants at [B2] and [C2] = four points. There are six fields in this example, with the largest that touches the completed city worth three points or more, depending on whether the incomplete city on the W edge of [A3] is completed by the end of the game.
2				City	14	The completed city covers five tiles at [C1]*[A2]*[B2]*[C2]*[B3] = ten points; it encloses two pennants at [B2] and [C2] = four points. There are six fields in this example, with the largest that touches the completed city worth three points or more, depending on whether the incomplete city on the W edge of [A3] is completed by the end of the game.
3				City	14	The completed city covers five tiles at [C1]*[A2]*[B2]*[C2]*[B3] = ten points; it encloses two pennants at [B2] and [C2] = four points. There are six fields in this example, with the largest that touches the completed city worth three points or more, depending on whether the incomplete city on the W edge of [A3] is completed by the end of the game.
	A	B	C	Cloister	9	The cloister at [B2] (one point) is surrounded by eight tiles (eight points). Also note there is a completed road [A2]—[B2] between the incomplete city [A1]*[A2]*[A3] and the cloister [B2] worth two points. This example has five fields and three incomplete cities.
1				Cloister	9	The cloister at [B2] (one point) is surrounded by eight tiles (eight points). Also note there is a completed road [A2]—[B2] between the incomplete city [A1]*[A2]*[A3] and the cloister [B2] worth two points. This example has five fields and three incomplete cities.
2				Cloister	9	The cloister at [B2] (one point) is surrounded by eight tiles (eight points). Also note there is a completed road [A2]—[B2] between the incomplete city [A1]*[A2]*[A3] and the cloister [B2] worth two points. This example has five fields and three incomplete cities.
3				Cloister	9	The cloister at [B2] (one point) is surrounded by eight tiles (eight points). Also note there is a completed road [A2]—[B2] between the incomplete city [A1]*[A2]*[A3] and the cloister [B2] worth two points. This example has five fields and three incomplete cities.

Sample game #1 in progress (5×5)
	A	B	C	D	E
1					
2					
3					
4					
5					

Consider the sample game #1 in progress on the 5×5 board shown; there are four complete cities: [B1]*[C1]*[C2] scoring eight points (three tiles plus one pennant) and three two-tile, four-point cities [C3]*[D3], [D3]*[E3], and [C4]*[C5]. There are two complete roads, scoring two points each: [A2]—[B2] and [B1]—[B2].

The largest field, bounded on the north by the roads in [A2]—[B2]—[C2], touches the two complete cities [C3]*[D3] and [C4]*[C5] and would score six points at the end of the game, more if the incomplete cities at [A2] and [C4]*[D4] are completed . In addition, the field could be extended by an appropriate piece in [D2] to touch the complete city [D3]*[E3].

Sample game #2 (6×10)
	A	B	C	D	E	F	G	H	I	J
1										
2										
3										
4										
5										
6										

Consider sample game #2 on the 6×10 board. In this example, followers are stationed on the board according to the capital first letter of the color name: "R"ed, "Y"ellow, "G"reen, "B"lue, and "P"urple, where purple is substituted for "B"lack to avoid confusion with blue.

There are three completed cities at [C2]*[D2]*[C3]*[D3], [F1]*[E2]*[F2]*[F3] and [H2]*[I2]. It is not possible to complete the city at [G4]*[G5]*[G6]; by examination of the available tiles, there is no tile that will fit in [H5] to continue all four edges, which also means the city in [H6] cannot be completed.

Similarly, because any piece that can be placed in [E1] must continue the three bordering edges, that piece in [E1] will connect the two fields that are currently claimed by the green farmer in [G1] and the red farmers in [C2] and [D2] alongside the yellow farmers in [H4], [H1], and [J3]. If no one else adds a farmer, yellow would claim the field by having the most followers in that merged field. The other shared-field situation is the red farmer in [D4] sharing a field with one blue farmer in [G5]. However, if a tile is played at [F6], it will connect to the field to the southeast; even though blue would have two farmers in the merged field, including the farmer in [G6], and would control the merged field, that field still does not touch any completed cities and would score no points unless the city at [C6]*[D6]*[E6] is completed.

There are two fields that have been completed and enclosed by loop roads in [I1]+[I2]+[J2]+[J1] and [C3]+[D3]+[E3]+[F3]+[F4]+[E4]+[D4]+[C4]. Neither of these fields touch any completed cities and so they would each score zero points. The Green farmer in [C5] is at risk of being enclosed in a loop and cut off from any completed cities.

The three cloisters at [H3], [E5], and [F5] include stationed monks because they are not completely surrounded by eight tiles; the two cloisters that are surrounded, at [G3] and [D5], are vacant because the claiming player(s) have scored those points. A tile played at [F6] would complete the surroundings for the blue monks at [E5] and [F5], scoring eighteen points for those followers.

Red has one knight follower in [D1], two thief followers in [B3] and [C4], and three farmer followers in [C2], [D2], and [D4]; this means that Red has only one follower remaining that can be stationed unless the roads or city are completed to score and return those followers to their stock. In contrast, purple only has one monk follower on the board at [H3] at this time, but that monk is effectively stranded until the end of the game: there is no possible tile that can be played in [I3] as there are only two single-road tiles (with a cloister) and those are already on the board at [H3] and [D5]. However, that monk will score eight points (one for the cloister and seven for the surrounding tiles) at the end of the game. Worse, the green knight follower in [H6] will not score any points and is stranded because the city will never be completed. Yellow has three farmer followers, one knight [J4], and one thief [I5]; both the knight and thief remain active and can be returned by completing that city and road, respectively.

=== Tiles ===
The original board game has 72 tiles with city, field, and road features; the River mini-expansion adds 12 tiles with river features. The version of the game currently in print includes the River and Abbot mini-expansions.

Non-river terrain tiles						River tiles			
City edges Road edges	0	1	2	3	4	City edges Road edges	0	1	2
0	4×	5×	3× 2× 1× 2× 3× 2×	3× 1×	1×	0	2× 2× 2×		1× 1×
1	2×			1× 2×		1	1×	1×	
2	8× 9×	4× 3× 3×	3× 2×			2	1× 1×		
3	4×	3×							
4	1×								

The river tiles are used as an alternative to the standard CRFR start tile and have the same dark-colored back to indicate this. The starting river tile is called the source (a river tile with a single river edge) and the final river tile is called the lake (again with a single river edge); players take turns placing all twelve river tiles to start the game, including follower placement and scoring, if relevant, then after the lake river tile has been played, proceed to place the remaining 71 terrain tiles.

==== Nomenclature ====
Modified Kárná notation
	C	
R		R
	F	

Kárná used a four-character tile code which described the feature on each edge of the tile as either a road (R), meadow (M, aka field), or city (C), written clockwise from an arbitrary starting edge. For instance, CRMR (modified as CRFR to conform with the terminology of this article) would describe the starting tile, starting from the top edge. With three possibilities for each edge, theoretically there are 81 (=3^{4}) possible tile combinations, but as some are duplicates because the tiles may be rotated arbitrarily, there are actually 24 possible combinations. Capaldi and Kolba, professors of mathematics at Valparaiso University, also counted 24 distinct types amongst the 71 non-river tiles of the starting set, although 5 of these were duplicates of other terrain tiles with the addition of pennant/coat of arms features. They assigned a single letter to each of the 24 types.

== Reception ==
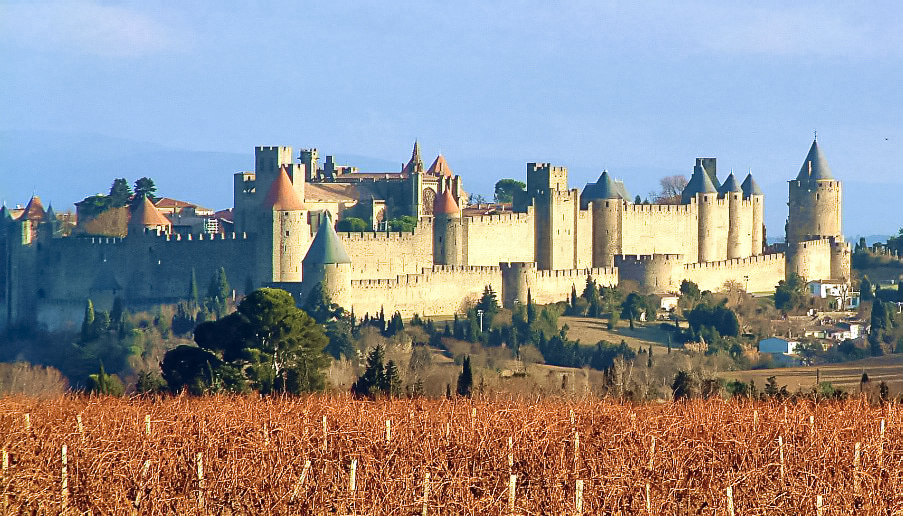
Walls of Carcassonne in France

Carcassonne is considered to be an excellent "gateway game" by many board game players as it is a game that can be used to introduce new players to board games. In a 2017 Ars Technica holiday buyer's guide, it was described as "one of the absolutely foundational games of the modern board gaming hobby".

The rules are simple, no one is ever eliminated, and the play is fast. A typical game, without any expansions, takes about 35 minutes to play. There is a substantial luck component to the game; however, good tactics greatly improve one's chances of winning. Examples of tactical considerations include:

- Conserving followers. Since each player has only seven followers, it can be easy to run out. This is especially important with fewer players, because then each player will play more tiles during the game.
- Joining in on other players' features. Often it is possible to add a separate road or castle segment near a big road or castle and join them up. This allows a player to gain points from their opponents' work.
- Avoiding sharing. An advantage can be gained by preventing other players from getting points. This is more important with fewer players, or if the sharing player is doing well.
- Judicious placement of followers in fields. Followers in the right field can be worth a lot of points. However, once placed, they are there for the whole game.
- Trapping opponents' followers. Not all possible tile configurations exist in the game. So if a player knows which tiles exist or are more common, they can create situations where it is hard or impossible for an opponent to complete some feature. The result is the opponent's follower is stuck in something half-completed.

The game has been used in education to teach geographical concepts.

== Reviews ==
- Games Unplugged #7 (April, 2001)
- Pyramid
- Rebel Times #9

== Expansions ==
Several official expansions for Carcassonne have been published, which add numerous additional rules, tiles and new kinds of figures. Together, they can more than double the length of the game. These expansions are generally compatible with each other and may be played together.

=== Full expansions ===
"Inns and Cathedrals" ("Wirtshäuser und Kathedralen", 2002)(2015 New Edition)
Originally known simply as "Carcassonne: The Expansion," Inns and Cathedrals adds some new tiles, and one new figure.

- A large figure that counts as two followers, when calculating who scores points for the completed feature.
- Special tiles with Inns and Cathedrals can be placed as part of roads and cities to enhance their value—provided they are completed by the end of the game. Inns add one point per road tile, while Cathedrals add one point per tile or pennant in a city. However, if the city or road is not completed, it has zero value.
- Six 50/100 point tiles to help keep score.
- Followers that allow a sixth player to play (grey 2002)(pink 2015)

"Traders and Builders" ("Händler und Baumeister", 2003)(2015 New Edition)
Adds additional tile types, two new figures, and trade good tiles.

- Trade goods appear in cities and are collected by the player who completes the city, even if they are not the one who scores it (thus encouraging the completion of other people's cities).
- A "pig" follower which increases the value of a field it is placed in.
- A "builder" follower which grants an extra turn to the owning player whenever the feature is extended or completed.
- An opaque cloth bag which players can use while drawing tiles.

"The Princess and the Dragon" ("Burgfräulein und Drache", 2005)(2016 New Edition)
The Princess and the Dragon adds new tiles and figures.

- Tiles with "magic portals" allow players to place followers on an incomplete feature of a previously placed tile.
- Volcano and Dragon tiles that place and move the dragon.
- Princess tiles and Dragon figure allow for followers to be removed.
- A Fairy figure also allows protection to a follower and its tile from the dragon.

"The Tower" ("Der Turm", March 2006)(2016 New Edition)
The Tower adds a vertical element to Carcassonne, adding new tiles and tower pieces.

- Eighteen tiles with tower foundations, which allow a player to add a tower section and capture nearby followers.
- Tower pieces to build with.
- A cardboard tile tower for easy tile storage, also acting as a mechanism from which tiles are drawn.

"Abbey and Mayor" ("Abtei und Bürgermeister", October 2007)(2016 New Edition)
Another full-sized expansion, featuring:

- Abbey tiles that can fill in holes in the board and complete features.
- Mayors who can be placed as followers in cities.
- A barn that causes field scoring.
- Wagons that can score features and then move to a nearby unclaimed and incomplete feature.
- Additional tiles that, in response to fan feedback, fix specific situations that have been previously impossible to complete.

"Count, King & Robber" ("Graf, König und Konsorten", 2008)(2017 New Edition)

- 12 tiles from River II mini expansion.
- 12 tiles forming the city of Carcassonne as a 3x4 starting tile from the Count mini expansion. (New Edition has 2 large (2x3) tiles that form the city.)
- Count meeple to be placed in the city of Carcassonne.
- 5 tiles from King mini expansion.
- King and Robber Baron tiles for the player/s who have completed the largest city and road respectively. (New edition also has 2 King and 2 Robber Baron tokens to mark the largest city and road scored so far.)
- 5 tiles with Shrines from the Cult mini expansion.

"The Catapult" ("Das Katapult", 2008)
An expansion, featuring:

- A physical catapult.
- 12 fairground tiles that initiate a round using the catapult.
- Tokens to be launched by the catapult.

"Bridges, Castles & Bazaars" ("Brücken, Burgen und Basare", February 2010)(2018 New Edition)
An expansion, featuring:

- 12 Bridge pieces enabling players to bridge roads over field tiles.
- 12 Castle tokens so players can gain additional points from 2-tile cities.
- 12 new tiles, eight featuring bazaars which introduce a new auction element to the game and four miscellaneous tiles.

"Hills & Sheep" ("Schafe und Hügel", June 2014)(2018 New Edition)
An expansion, featuring:

- 16 sheep tokens, featuring either one, two, three or four sheep each.
- 2 wolf tokens.
- 1 cloth bag for the sheep and wolf tokens.
- 1 "shepherd" follower in each of the six colors (one for each player).
- 18 new tiles, 8 featuring hills, 8 featuring vineyards and 2 featuring cloisters.

"Under the Big Top" ("Manege Frei", March 2017)
An expansion, featuring:

- 20 new tiles, featuring Big Top or Acrobat tower
- 16 animal tokens
- 6 Ringmaster meeples, 1 in each player color
- 1 wooden circus tent figure

=== Mini expansions ===
Carcassonne — The River (Carcassonne — Der Fluss, 2001)
Originally distributed for free as a give-away by the publisher at trade fairs. It was being included with many purchased versions by 2004. Early 2009 saw a slightly different version available at stores. The 2007 Xbox Live Arcade version includes a toggle option for the expansion. This expansion was added to the base game in August 2012, and also included in the 2014 Redesign of the base game.

- 12 River tiles that replace the single initial tile.

Carcassonne — King and Scout (Carcassonne — König und Späher, 2003)
'King and Scout' is two expansions: King for Carcassonne and Scout for Carcassonne: Hunters and Gatherers.

- King and Robber Baron tiles used to keep track of who built the largest road and city.
- 5 additional tiles, with combinations that were previously missing

Carcassonne — The Cathars (Carcassonne — Die Katharer, 2004)
Originally published in the German board game magazine Spielbox, and republished in their Carcassonne almanac with an English translation.

- Four siege tiles where Cathars break city walls. These halve the value of the city but double its contribution to field scores. Monasteries allow followers in cities to escape and come back to their players.

The Count of Carcassonne (Der Graf von Carcassonne, 2004)
Via new tiles, provides an incentive to complete other players' features: when a player does so, that player may place a follower in the city of Carcassonne, and then later move that follower into a feature as it completed (commonly known as "paratrooping").

- Twelve tiles depicting the city of Carcassonne itself. These replace the initial starting tile and support new game mechanics.
- A count figure, which can block paratrooping.

Carcassonne — The River II (Der Fluss II, November 2005)
Similar to the original River expansion, The River II tiles include features from previous expansions, for example a volcano to invoke the dragon. The 2012 Xbox Windows Phone version includes a toggle option for the expansion.

- 12 new tiles to create a larger, forked river

Carcassonne — The Mini-Expansion (Winter 2006)
Published in Games Quarterly Magazine, Issue No. 11,

- A new spring with a road, which separates a field, thereby preventing some very large fields as allowed by the original River.
- 11 additional tiles.

Carcassonne — The Cult (Carcassonne — Die Kultstätte, 2007)
Published originally in Count, King & Robber, then republished as a standalone expansion in Spielbox: Hans im Glück Almanach 2008. Later available by Rio Grande Games in Cult, Siege & Creativity,

- Six tiles depicting heretical shrines that can be used in rivalries with cloisters and abbeys

Carcassonne — Tunnel (Carcassonne — Der Tunnel, 2009)
Published in Spielbox: Issue 2009/6

- Four new tiles and twelve chips to create tunnels
- Tunnels can also be built with The Princess and the Dragon tunnel entrances

Carcassonne — Crop Circles (Carcassonne — Die Kornkreise, 2010)
Published with German versions of the Carcassonne base game.

- Six new tiles depicting three pairs of symbols allowing players to add or remove followers from other tiles

Carcassonne — The Plague (Carcassonne — Die Pest, 2010)
Published in Spielbox, Issue 2010/6

- Six new tiles depicting plague zones allowing players to remove followers from tiles.
- Six small tiles numbered from 1 to 6
- 18 flea chips

Carcassonne — The School (Carcassonne — Die Schule, 2011)

- 2 additional starting tiles depicting a school with six roads branching off. When a road attached to the school is completed, the player claims the Teacher meeple included, and then gains the same points as the next scored feature, and returning the Teacher to the school.

Carcassonne — The Festival (Carcassonne — Das Fest, 2011) (2016 New Edition - 15th Anniversary)
Included as a bonus with the 10th anniversary edition of the base game.

- Ten additional tiles (1 for each year since the game's release represent the festival) which allows players to either place a follower as normal, or take one back from any tile.

Carcassonne — The Phantom (Carcassonne — Das Gefolge, 2011)
Released as stand-alone mini expansion

- Six additional followers, 1 for each color that represent phantoms and allow a second follower to be placed on a turn.
- This is the first expansion that does not include tiles, and is also the first time meeples have been released in plastic. Each meeple is a see-through acrylic of a different color to represent a phantom.
- 0 additional tiles.
- Not compatible with the 10th anniversary edition of the base game (10th edition replaced all of the wooden meeples with the same plastic meeples used in the phantom expansion, which makes it impossible to tell them apart even though they would use new rules)

Carcassonne Minis (2012)

Six stand-alone mini expansions, with each containing a tile for a seventh mini expansion.

1. Carcassonne — The Flying Machines (Carcassonne — Die Fluggeräte)

- 8 tiles which allow the player to "fly" to claim an unfinished feature (even if already occupied), or to "crash" by landing where there are no tiles, by rolling a die that gives only 1/2/3.
- 1 Custom Die
- Plus a bonus Corn Circles II tile.

2. Carcassonne — The Messengers (Carcassonne — Die Depeschen)

- 6 new Messenger Meeple for the scorecard which allow for possible bonus points by drawing from a new stack of action tiles.
- 8 action tiles
- Plus a bonus Corn Circles II tile.

3. Carcassonne — The Ferries (Carcassonne — Die Fähren)

- 8 tiles featuring roads leading to lakes. Players may place an included ferry piece to extend a road.
- 8 Ferry pieces
- Plus a bonus Corn Circles II tile.

4. Carcassonne — The Gold Mines (Carcassonne — Die Goldminen)

- 8 tiles which incorporate the included gold bar pieces, which allow for bonus points at the end of the game
- 16 Gold Bar pieces
- Plus a bonus Corn Circles II tile.

5. Carcassonne — Mage & Witch (Carcassonne — Magier & Hexe)

- 8 tiles which allow placement of the Mage or Witch on incomplete features. Resulting in adjusted scoring when completed.
- 1 Mage figure & 1 Witch figure
- Plus a bonus Corn Circles II tile.

6. Carcassonne — The Robbers (Carcassonne — Die Räuber)

- 8 tiles which allow placement of a Robber, resulting in stealing some of another player's points.
- 6 Robber Meeples
- Plus a bonus Corn Circles II tile.

7. Carcassonne — Corn Circles II (Carcassonne — Die Kornkreise)

- 6 tiles making a new Corn Circles expansion composed of each of the bonus tiles from the 6 minis.
- Corn circles allow for placement of a second follower in a feature already claimed by that player, or to remove a follower from the board.
- Different Corn Circle tiles from that of the previous Corn Circles expansion. (Can both be combined for more Corn Circles.)
- Not available as a stand alone.

Carcassonne — The Wind Roses (Die Windrosen) (2012–2013)

- 6 land tiles with wind roses

Carcassonne — The Watchtower (Carcassonne — Die Wachtürme, 2014)
Released through cundco.de

- 12 tiles depicting watchtowers with specialized bonuses on each tile.
- Players placing a meeple on the bonus feature of the watchtower tile get the bonus when that feature is completed.

Carcassonne — Halflings (Carcassonne — Halb so wild I & Halb so wild II, 2014)

- 24 triangular land tiles

Carcassonne — The Markets of Leipzig (Carcassonne — Die Märkte zu Leipzig, 2017)
Released through cundco.d

- Includes 4 double-sized tiles that form the market town of Leipzig with 4 roads extending out to replace the starting tile.
- Whenever a player scores on one of the attached road networks, they may move their meeple to one of the 4 quarters of Leipzig and potentially score additional points at the end of the game.

Carcassonne — The Fruit-bearing Trees (Carcassonne — Die Obstbäume, 2018)
Released through cundco.de

- Includes 6 tiles with fruit trees on them.
- When the fruit-bearing tree tile is placed, 4 tokens are stacked face down on top of it. When another tile is placed adjacent to the fruit-bearing tree tile, the player may either collect the top token from the tree and score the points depicted or sell their collected tokens at the market.

Carcassonne — The Toll Keepers (Carcassonne — Die Zöllner, 2019)
Released through cundco.de

- Includes 6 tiles and 6 toll tokens (1 in each player color).
- Instead of placing a meeple, you may place your toll token on an open crossroads. When a road that ends at your tolled crossroads, you score points for the travelers, farms, stables, highwaymen, and gardens on the road.

Carcassonne — Maps (2019–)

- Each map sold separately.
- Set of 30 chips sold separately
- Map selections include France, Benelux, Great Britain, Península Ibérica (Iberian Peninsula), Deutschland (Germany), USA West und East, Taiwan, Nordics, and Ukraine.

Carcassonne — The Peasant Revolts (Carcassonne — Bauernaufstände, 2020)

- 12 terrain tiles with icons denoting revolt in a city, road, or cloister

Carcassonne — The Gifts (Carcassonne — Die Geschenke, 2020)

- 25 cards

Carcassonne — The Signposts (Carcassonne — Die Wegweiser, 2021)

- "12 new land tiles, each depicting 2 of 3 different types of signposts"

Carcassonne — The Bets (Carcassonne — Die Wetteinsätze, 2022)

- 10 bookmaker tiles (land tile with a betting office depicted) & 36 betting chips

Mists over Carcassonne (Nebel über Carcassonne, 2023)

- spin-off played as a cooperative game, or acts as a competitive expansion called Ghosts, Castles and Cemeteries (Geister, Schlösser und Friedhöfe)
- 60 land tiles (roads, cities, castles, cemeteries, mist), 4x4 starting tile, scoring track with 2 hound tiles (Rufus & Ronja) and 1 goal tile, 30 guard meeples, 15 ghosts

=== Compilations ===
Carcassonne Big Box

- The original game,
- Inns and Cathedrals
- Traders and Builders
- The Princess and the Dragon
- Tower
- River (only in Rio Grande version)

Carcassonne — Cult, Siege, and Creativity (2008)

- Cult (with one additional tile)
- Siege (an adaptation of the Cathars expansion)
- Two blank white tiles for use in making custom expansions

Carcassonne Big Box 2 (2008, 2009)
This Big Box is the same size as the previous Big Box, but with a slightly different component mix.

- The original game
- Inns and Cathedrals
- Traders and Builders
- The Princess and the Dragon
- Abbey and Mayor
- Count, King and Cult
- River II

"Wheel of Fortune" ("Das Schicksalsrad", July 2009)
A full replacement for the base game and/or expansion, featuring:

- 72 tiles with some new/different tiles as compared to the original base game.
- 40 followers (in 5 colors) and a scoreboard.
- A new start-tile which depicts the Wheel of Fortune
- The Wheel of Fortune – a new mechanic based on icons on 16 tiles allowing an element of "fate" into the game. Events that can be triggered include famine, plague, and fortune, among others.
- A large pink pig animeeple that moves along the rim of the wheel.

Carcassonne Big Box 3 (2010, 2011)

- The original game
- Inns and Cathedrals
- Traders and Builders
- The Princess and the Dragon
- Abbey and Mayor
- Bridges, Castles and Bazaars

Carcassonne 10 year anniversary edition (2011)
A stand alone release of the original game to celebrate the 10th anniversary with special packaging, "crystal" meeples made from see through acrylic and a special mini expansion, the festival.

- The original game,
- The Festival
- Meeple shaped storage box (holds only the base game and meeples, no room for expansions)
- Acrylic meeples (not compatible with phantom expansion which uses the same figures to create new rules options)

Carcassonne Big Box 4 (2012)
This Big Box edition is published by Z-Man Games.

- The original game
- Inns and Cathedrals
- Traders and Builders
- Mini Expansion 1 – The Flying Machines
- Mini Expansion 2 – The Messengers
- Mini Expansion 3 – The Ferries
- Mini Expansion 4 – The Gold Mines
- Mini Expansion 5 – Mage & Witch
- Mini Expansion 6 – The Robbers
- Mini Expansion 7 – The Crop Circles II

Carcassonne Big Box 5 (2014)
This Big Box edition is published by Z-Man Games.

- The original game
- Inns and Cathedrals
- Traders and Builders
- Hills & Sheep
- The Wheel of Fortune
- Mini Expansion – The River
- New Meeples for 7 & 8 player games

Carcassonne Big Box 6 (2017)
This Big Box edition is published by Z-Man Games.

- The new edition of the original game with river and abbot expansions
- Inns and Cathedrals
- Traders and Builders
- Mini Expansion 1 – The Flying Machines
- Mini Expansion 2 – The Messengers
- Mini Expansion 3 – The Ferries
- Mini Expansion 4 – The Gold Mines
- Mini Expansion 5 – Mage & Witch
- Mini Expansion 6 – The Robbers
- Mini Expansion 7 – The Crop Circles II

== Spin-offs ==
Comparison of the starting tile and tile backs for the basic game (center) with two spin-offs: The Ark of the Covenant (left) and Carcassonne: Hunters and Gatherers (right)

Following the success of Carcassonne, a number of games have been spun off from the main game, all sharing similar mechanics. There is also a travel-sized version of the original game, Travel Carcassonne (Reise-Carcassonne), released in 2007.

Carcassonne: Hunters and Gatherers (Carcassonne: Die Jäger und Sammler, 2002)
Hunters and Gatherers is a stand-alone game that involves the building of forests, rivers and wildlife rather than cities and roads. This game attempted to rectify some perceived faults in the original by eliminating cloisters, introducing a "special tile" system to encourage players to complete cities (now forests) owned by other players, and making the value of meadows vary both up and down with animals that appear on the tiles.
The Ark of the Covenant (2003)
Ark is a biblical-themed version of Carcassonne by Inspiration Games based on the Old Testament, which includes the animal feature found in Hunters and Gatherers, as well as the Ark itself which may be moved in lieu of follower placement, scoring points for followers that they pass through.
Carcassonne: The Castle (Carcassonne: Die Burg, 2003)
The Castle is a two-player spin-off, designed by Reiner Knizia, where the game is played within the confines of a fixed castle. Players gain extra abilities by scoring an exact number of points, and tile placement rules are relaxed. A downloadable expansion called The Falcon was released in 2015.
Carcassonne: The City (Carcassonne: Die Stadt, 2004)
The City is a "deluxe-style" stand-alone game similar to The Castle, where tile placement is relaxed. The significant new rules involve the addition of city walls when the city grows beyond a certain size.
Carcassonne: The Discovery (Carcassonne: Neues Land, 2005)
An exploration-themed stand-alone game that involves mountains, seas and meadows. The significant change in this game is that followers are no longer automatically removed when a terrain feature is completed: they must be removed as a game action, in lieu of placing a new follower that turn. Players may choose to remove a follower from, and score for, a terrain feature before it is completed, albeit for fewer points; followers remaining on the map at the end of the game also suffer a score penalty even if the features they are standing on are completed.
New World: A Carcassonne Game (Carcassonne: Mayflower, 2008)
New World is a stand-alone game that allows players to play Carcassonne in the New World, aka America. Players begin the basic tile-laying from a coastal edge and move westward, creating towns, hunting, farming, and trail blazing as they go along. Although terminology has changed, this game follows the basic rules of Carcassonne very closely but is more restricted than the basic game.
My First Carcassonne (Die Kinder von Carcassonne, 2009)
Unveiled at the Nuremberg International Toy Fair in February 2009 this is a short game for younger children inspired by Carcassonne, designed by Marco Teubner.
Cardcassonne (2009)
This is a card game based on Carcassonne.
Carcassonne: The Dice Game, 2011
A set of 9 specialized dice with city segments, meeples, and catapults, where players roll the dice to create cities to gain points.
Carcassonne: Winter Edition (2012)
is a standalone Carcassonne game where the tiles are depicted with Winter Snow, the set contains the base-72-tiles plus an additional 12 tiles . An expansion called The Gingerbreadman was released in 2012.
Carcassonne: South Seas (Carcassonne: Südsee, 2013)
South Seas is the first title in the Carcassonne: Around the World series. A tropical-themed version, varying gameplay by adding a resource element that affects the point score. An expansion called Friday was released in 2013.
Carcassonne: Gold Rush (Carcassonne: Goldrausch, 2014)
Gold Rush is the second title in the Carcassonne: Around the World series of tile-laying games. Gold Rush, players return to the 19th century in the United States. Players mine for gold and complete railroads to score points. A new mechanic is the Tent which can be used to steal Golden Tokens from other players before they complete their mountain. An expansion called The Sheriff was released in 2014.
Carcassonne: Over Hill and Dale (Carcassonne: Über Stock und Stein, 2015)
Over Hill and Dale is a standalone game in the Carcassonne series. In this new game, towns and castles are replaced by fields of fruits and vegetables. Fruit is collected, stables are built to house animals, and paths can be walked down to score points.
Carcassonne: Star Wars (Carcassonne: Star Wars, 2015)
In this Star Wars version, the known rules of Carcassonne are simplified by removing the farmer mechanic, but Cloisters are replaced with Planets that can be attacked, by rolling dice to beat one's opponent. Co-op play is introduced with a 2v2 mechanism. A boxed expansion for this game was released in 2016.
Carcassonne: Amazonas (2016)
Amazonas is the third title in the Carcassonne: Around the World series. It takes players to the Amazon rainforest, where players can expand villages, forests, and the Amazon River and tributaries.
Carcassonne: Safari (2018)
Safari is the fourth title in the Carcassonne: Around the World series.

== Video games ==
Carcassonne for Facebook
A Facebook application.
Carcassonne for iOS
An iPhone and iPad application developed by TheCodingMonkeys. This version has a Metacritic rating of 93% based on 10 critic reviews.
Carcassonne for Windows Phone
An Xbox Live-enabled Windows Phone 8 application.
Carcassonne on mobile- and smartphones (Android, J2ME)
Developed by exozet games. Release: July/August 2011.
Carcassonne: The Computer Game
A PC-based version of Carcassonne that included AI, online, and hotseat modes. It was distributed only in Germany by games company Koch Media and discontinued in 2006.
Carcassonne on BrettspielWelt (BSW)
Includes the expansions: The River, Inns & Cathedrals, Traders & Builders, Princess & Dragon, and King & Scout, as well as options to score based on different rulesets used across various editions of the game.
Carcassonne for Xbox 360
In 2006, Microsoft announced in a press release that Carcassonne would be an Xbox Live Arcade title alongside Catan and Alhambra. The title was published by Sierra Online and released on 27 June 2007; it includes all the tiles of the original game and those of "The River" expansion. This version of the game uses the 3rd Edition scoring rules by default; the game allows alternate and/or older rules for non-ranked and single player games. Sierra had promised to release the expansions as well. As of 30 October 2009, The River II expansion and King & Baron (King & Scout) expansions are available. On 15 November 2007, Microsoft made Carcassonne available free of charge for seven days to celebrate the fifth anniversary of their Xbox Live service.
Carcassonne for Nintendo DS
Video game news website Kotaku announced on 9 July 2009 that an iteration of the game would be released on Nintendo DS in 2009. The game includes the "River" expansion as well as three new "worlds" described as "Asian, Nordic and Arabic."
JCloisterZone
A PC-based application implemented in Java.
"Age of Thieves"
A game made for AmigaOS 4.1
Concarneau
A web version of the game implemented in JavaScript.
Carcassonne: Tiles & Tactics
The official adaptation of the board game published on Steam. The game includes the Abbots and the River expansion as a DLC. A Nintendo Switch port based on Tiles and Tactics (Asmodee Digital) was announced in a September Nintendo Direct and released on 29 November 2017.

== Tournaments ==
The format of competitive Carcassonne tournaments is to use only the base game of Carcassonne (the original 72 tiles) and for games to be between only two players.

International Carcassonne tournaments were held in Germany in 2003–2005.

=== World Championship ===
The first official Carcassonne World Championship was held at SPIEL in Essen, Germany, in 2006. An annual world championship has been held at SPIEL every year since 2006 with the exceptions of the 2010 and the 2023 championships, which were held during SPIEL but at an alternate location in Herne, Germany; and the 2020 edition which was cancelled due to the COVID-19 pandemic.

Qualification for the World Championship is primarily reserved for national champions, along with the defending World Champion. Since 2023 a number of additional wildcard qualifications have been granted. This has included the winner of the Mind Sports Olympiad online championship, and top ranking teams of the World Teams Online Championship. In the 2021, each country was allowed to participate with two players, following the cancellation of the 2020 edition.

Ralph Querfurth has been the World Champion in four editions. Pantelis Litsardopoulos is the only other player to have won the World Championship on more than one occasion, having reached the final in five consecutive years. Els Bulten is the only female champion.

Year	World Champion	2nd	3rd	4th	Participants
2006	(Germany) Ralph Querfurth	(Austria) Michael Wischounig	(Czech Republic) David Korejtko	(Hungary) Dávid Erdős	16
2007	(Germany) Sebastian Trunz	(Taiwan) Chen Wei-Chi	(Finland) Janne Jaula	(Norway) Henrik Fürstenberg	20
2008	(Germany) Ralph Querfurth	(Czech Republic) Martin Mojžiš	(Germany) Sebastian Trunz	(Austria) Stefan Leopoldseder	20
2009	(Germany) Ralph Querfurth	(Australia) Daniel Geromboux	(Slovakia) Matej Tabak	(Finland) Petri Savola	20
2010	(Germany) Ralph Querfurth	(Czech Republic) Martin Mojžiš	(Slovakia) Matej Tabak	(Australia) Randy Dreger	22
2011	(Netherlands) Els Bulten	(Japan) Shinnosuke Komukai	(Germany) Robert Mützner	(Czech Republic) Martin Mojžiš	24
2012	(Czech Republic) Martin Mojžiš	(Austria) Stefan Leopoldseder	(Slovakia) Matej Tabak	(Netherlands) Els Bulten	26
2013	(Greece) Pantelis Litsardopoulos	(Czech Republic) Martin Mojžiš	(Latvia) Aleksejs Peguševs	(Poland) Maciej Śmieszek	36
2014	(Japan) Takafumi Mochizuki	(Greece) Pantelis Litsardopoulos	(Slovakia) Matej Tabak	(Portugal) Ricardo Jorge Gomes	34
2015	(Greece) Pantelis Litsardopoulos	(Japan) Takafumi Mochizuki	(Netherlands) Els Bulten	(Brazil) Humberto Fukuda	32
2016	(Russia) Vladimir Kovalev	(Greece) Pantelis Litsardopoulos	(Belgium) Wannes Vansina	(Slovakia) Matej Tabak	36
2017	(Poland) Tomasz Preuss	(Greece) Pantelis Litsardopoulos	(Italy) Davide Sandrin	(Slovakia) Matej Tabak	38
2018	(Japan) Genro Fujimoto	(Romania) Marian Curcan	(Germany) Kolja Stratmann	(Poland) Tomasz Preuss	34
2019	(Romania) Marian Curcan	(Taiwan) Ying Chien Chien	(Estonia) Timofei Gretsenko	(Italy) Paolo Ballabeni	36
2021	(Poland) Maciej Polak	(Brazil) Melvin Quaresma	(Poland) Tomasz Preuss	(Portugal) Nuno Torres	42
2022	(Romania) Árpád Gere	(Taiwan) Min-Wei Chen	(Czech Republic) Martin Mojžiš	(Norway) Hogne Jorgensen	34
2023	(United Kingdom) Matt Tucker	(Latvia) Aleksejs Peguševs	(Netherlands) Patrick Bekkenutte	(China) Xiangyu Qin	42
2024	(Spain) Daniel Angelats	(Hungary) József Tihon	(Romania) Bogdan Curcan	(China) Ning Ding	46
2025	(China) Xiangyu Qin	(Uruguay) Horacio Mastandrea	(Belgium) Raf Mesotten	(Latvia) Aleksejs Peguševs	52
2026	(Ukraine) Nazarii Pavliuk	(Czech Republic) Pavel Hudec	Vladimir Kovalev	(Norway) Hogne Jorgensen	54

=== Mind Sports Olympiad ===
Since 2020 the Mind Sports Olympiad have run open international tournaments in a similar format to the World Championships. For 2020 and 2021 only an online tournament was held, but since 2022 both online and in-person tournaments have been held in London.

Online Tournaments

Year	Gold	Silver	Bronze	Participants
2020	(Portugal) Ricardo Araujo	(Romania) Bogdan Curcan	(Taiwan) Po-Chun Chang	115
2021	(Latvia) Aleksejs Peguševs	(Malaysia) Siang Sheng Ling	(Hong Kong) Kei Tsi Daniel Cheng	141
2022	(Romania) Marian Curcan	(Lithuania) Batal Albotov	(Taiwan) Po-Chun Chang	74
2023	(Chile) Jorim Mella	(Portugal) Afonso Cavaco	(Spain) Francisco Javier Poveda Pérez	161
2024	(Latvia) Kriss Kaukis	(Finland) Otto Ikonen	(Ukraine) Yaroslav Herasymenko	168
2025	(Latvia) Aleksejs Peguševs	(Croatia) Zvonimir Vlaić	(Czech Republic) Pavel Hudec	194
2026	(Latvia) Aleksejs Peguševs	(Ukraine) Denys Shandar	(Poland) Tomasz Preuss	222

In-Person MSO Tournaments

Year	Gold	Silver	Bronze	Participants
2022	(United Kingdom) Nicolas Basty	(United Kingdom) Matt Tucker	(Poland) Maciej Brzeski	28
2023	(Spain) Francisco Javier Poveda Pérez	(Catalonia) Dani Angelats	(United Kingdom) Matt Tucker	34
2024	(Portugal) Guilherme Neves	(Portugal) Nuno Torres	(Portugal) Ricardo Jorge Gomes	34
2025	(Hong Kong) Tung Yat Cheng	(Romania) Marian Curcan	(Latvia) Aleksejs Peguševs (Czech Republic) Pavel Hudec	38
2026	(Romania) Bogdan Curcan	(Hong Kong) Tung Yat Cheng	(Catalonia) Dani Angelats	55

=== World Team Carcassonne Online Championship ===
As a result of the cancellation of World Championship in 2020, the community of Carcassonne Catalonia decided to create an online world championship for teams, to be played online for several weeks on the online platform Board Game Arena. Named World Team Carcassonne Online Championship (WTCOC), the format of the tournament is for each match to have 5 players selected by both teams. Each player is paired with an opponent who they play a best-of-3 games to make up a 'Duel'. The winner of each duel scores a point for their team in the match.

From the start of the second edition, in 2021, the WTCOC has been officially sanctioned by the publisher Hans Im Glück and World Championship organisers Spielezentrum. Beginning in 2023 the top 4 teams in the WTCOC have been able to send an extra participant to the World Championships in Germany. This was reduced to the top 3 teams in 2024.

Year	World Champion	2nd	3rd	4th	Participating teams
2020	Japan	Russia	Germany	Romania	21
2021	Japan	Russia	Romania	Catalonia	29
2022	Japan	China	RCP	Portugal	25
2023	China	RCP	Latvia	Spain	32
2024	Japan	France	Hungary	United Kingdom	36
2025	Japan	Chile	Ukraine	Poland	38
2026	China	Ukraine	Hong Kong	Germany	40
