= Ralph Querfurth =

German board-game editor and designer

Ralph Querfurth (born 1979 in Erlangen, Bavaria) is a German board game editor and board game designer. He is one of the creators of the board game series Exit - The Game. This series of Escape Room style board games has been sold over 18 million times worldwide since 2016.

== Life ==
Querfurth studied IT in Coburg. After his studies he began to work as a board game editor at the publisher Kosmos.

After learning about one of the first Escape Rooms in the city he lives in (Stuttgart, Germany) he had the initial idea to transfer the Escape Game idea to board games. He developed the concept for the board game series Exit - The Games, supported by Sandra Dochtermann (board game editor at Kosmos). Kosmos hired the couple Inka and Markus Brand as designers for Exit - The Game, who developed the games together with Querfurth (Querfurth as editor, Inka and Markus Brand as designers). Later Querfurth also became co-designer for several Exit games.

== Achievements ==
Board Game Tournaments

- 2x German Champion in the board game Carcassonne 2006& 2023.
- 1x Online Team European Champion in the board game Carcassonne 2020.
- 4x World Champion in the board game Carcassonne 2006, 2008, 2009& 2010.
- 1x German Champion in the card game Tichu 2008.

Board Game Awards

- German Connoisseur-gamer Game of the Year for Exit – The Game: The Abandoned Cabin, The Secret Lab, The Pharao's Tomb 2017

== Games ==
- Star Wars - Attack of the Rebels, gemeinsam mit Sandra Dochtermann, Kosmos, 2011
- Star Wars - Anakin's Podrace, gemeinsam mit Sandra Dochtermann, Kosmos, 2012
- Star Wars - Combat against Darth Maul, gemeinsam mit Sandra Dochtermann, Kosmos, 2012
- Exit - The Game: The Sinister Mansion, together with Inka und Markus Brand, Kosmos, 2018
- Exit - The Game: The Mysterious Museum, together with Inka und Markus Brand, Kosmos, 2018
- Exit - The Game: The Catacombs of Horror, together with Inka und Markus Brand, Kosmos, 2018
- Exit - The Game: Theft on the Mississippi, together with Inka und Markus Brand, Kosmos, 2019
- Exit - The Game: The Gate Between Worlds, together with Inka und Markus Brand, Kosmos, 2020
- Roll'em Fold'em, together with Klaus-Jürgen Wrede, Schmidt Spiele, 2021
- Echt Spitze, together with Klaus-Jürgen Wrede, Schmidt Spiele, 2022
