= Samurai (board game) =

Board game designed by Reiner Knizia

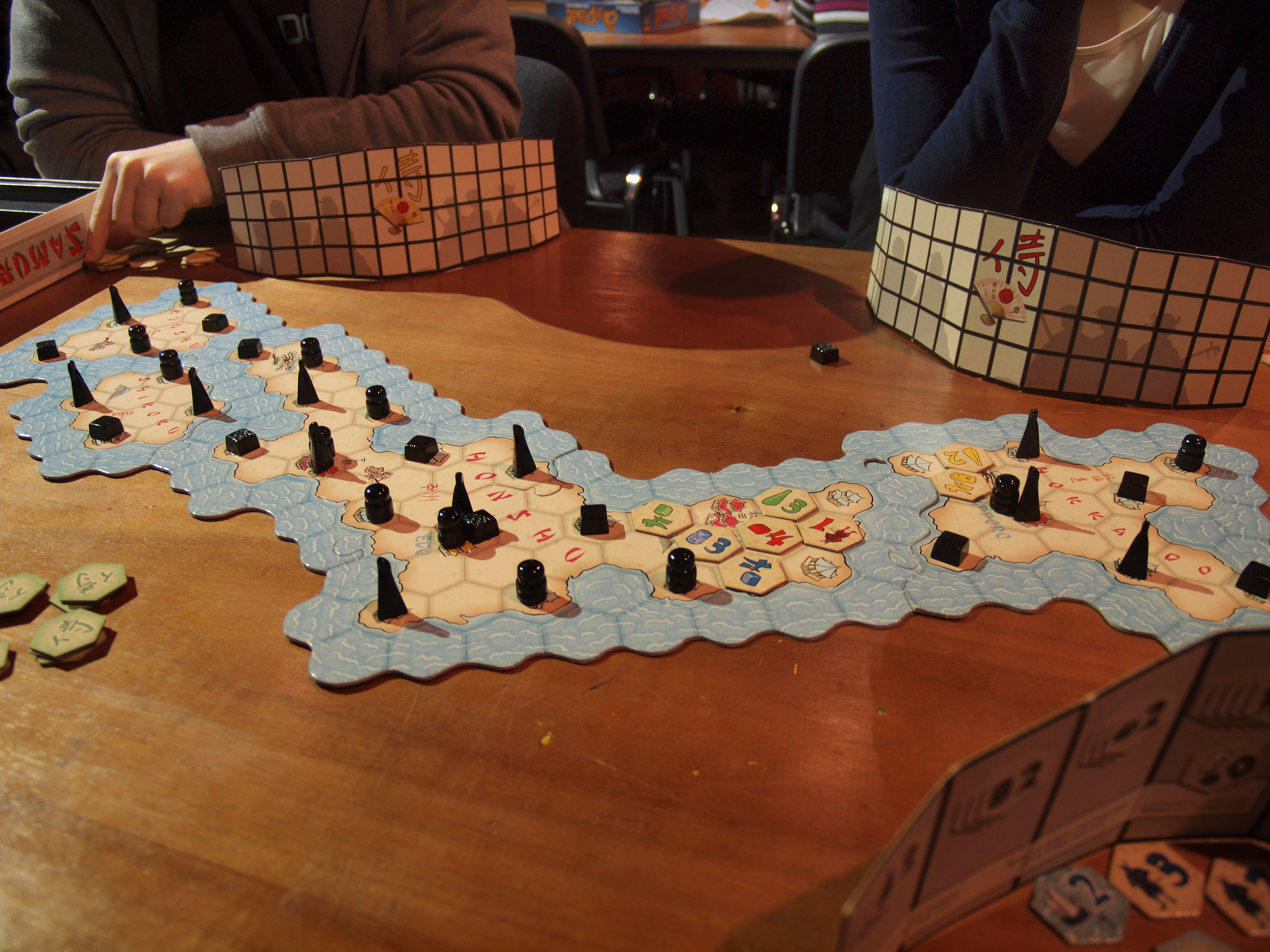
- Designers: Reiner Knizia
- Publishers: Abacus – German; Rio Grande Games – English; Wargames Club - Chinese
- Publication: 1998
- Players: 2–4
- Setup time: 5 minutes
- Playing time: 45 minutes
- Chance: Tile drawing
- Age range: 10+
- Skills: Tile laying

Samurai is a German-style board game invented by Reiner Knizia, distributed by Hans im Glück in Germany and Fantasy Flight in the United States. It won the Deutscher Spiele Preis 4th place award in 1999. A shareware computer version was published by Klear Games in 2003, an iOS version was published by Conlan Rios Games in 2010, and an iOS, Android and Steam version was released in 2025 by Synthetic Mind AB.

== Game play ==
The game board is split into the four major Japanese islands of Hokkaidō, Honshū, Shikoku, and Kyūshū, and on every island are a number of cities and villages. Each player has 20 tokens that represent various levels of influence against a certain force—rice fields, Buddhas, and high helmets. Each of the forces are represented on the board with an acrylic glass figurine.

At the beginning of the game, players place the figurines one-by-one onto a city or village, with the capital city of Edo containing one of each figurine. Cities may contain two figures, but only if they are different. Villages may contain only one figurine. After all of the figurines are placed each player takes five tokens from their supply.

Players then take turns in placing their force tokens on the spaces surrounding a city or village. A player must play at least one token on their turn. These tokens may be played only once per turn:

- Figure-specific tokens – Printed with a specific force figurine and a number and only influence that particular force.
- Samurai tokens – A samurai can influence any of the three forces.
- Swap tokens – Swap this token with an existing token on the board, then move the old token to a new location.

Any number of the following tokens may be played on each turn. These tokens also have a small character printed on the bottom of the token.

- Ship tokens – Printed with an influence number and a ship icon, but may only be used in water.
- Exchange tokens – Discard this token and swap the positions of any two different figurines.
- Ronin token – A ronin can influence any of the three forces.

At the end of a turn the player takes random tokens from their supply to replenish their hand back to five.

Once a figurine is completely surrounded by tokens the player with the highest total of surrounding influence immediately takes the figurine. The figure is placed to the side in the event of a tie.

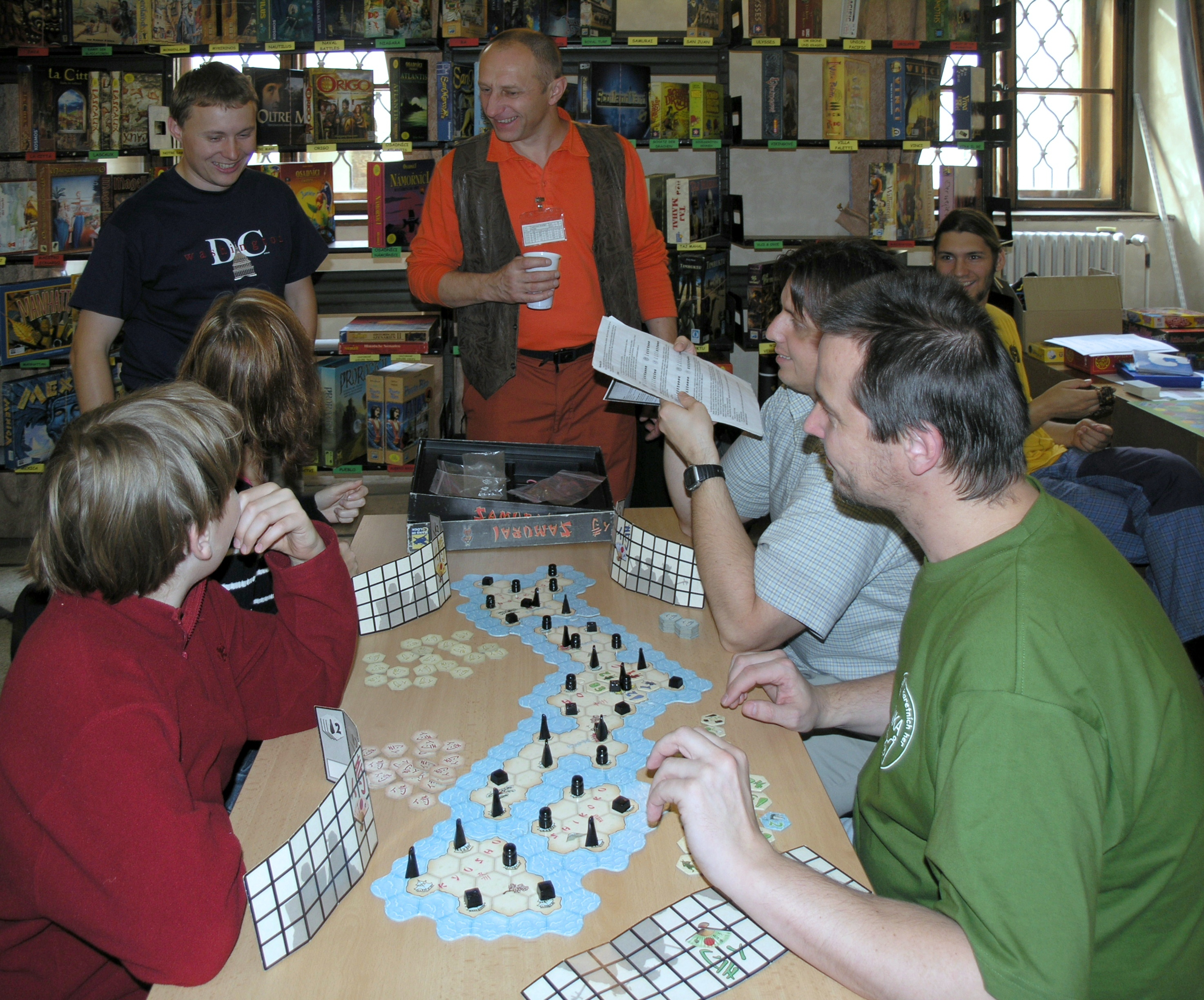
Samurai

The game is over when all figurines of one type have been claimed by players or any four figurines have been set aside due to a tie. The winner is determined as follows:

- The player with the most of at least any two particular figurines is considered the winner. Note that if 2 or more players were to tie with the most of a particular figurine, none of those players would receive the majority for that figurine.
- If no player has a majority in at least two figurine types, any player that has the most of one figurine is still eligible to win, while those that do not have a majority of any type are eliminated. Of the remaining players, the winner is the player with the highest number of figurines excluding the type in which the player has a majority, or their 'other' figurines. If there is a tie between the other figurines, then the winner is the player with the most total figurines. If there is still a tie after that, then those players who are tied with the highest total figurines share the victory.

(E.g. p1 has 5 helmets, 3 buddhas, and 1 rice field. P2 has 2 helmets, 3 buddhas, and 2 rice fields. p1 has the majority in helmets (his 5 vs p2's 2). Both players are tied in buddhas (3 vs 3) while p2 has the majority in rice (his 2 vs p1's 1). P1's other figures would be 4 (3 buddhas + 1 rice field) while p2's other figures would be 5 (2 helmets + 3 buddhas). P2 wins even though p1 has more total figures.

- If none of the players from above had a majority of any particular figurine (again, ties do NOT constitute a majority) the winner is decided by total number of figurines.

== Video games ==
Samurai has been ported over to multiple electronic platforms including PC and iOS.

== Reviews ==
- Backstab #21
