= Meeple =

Small wooden human-like board-game piece

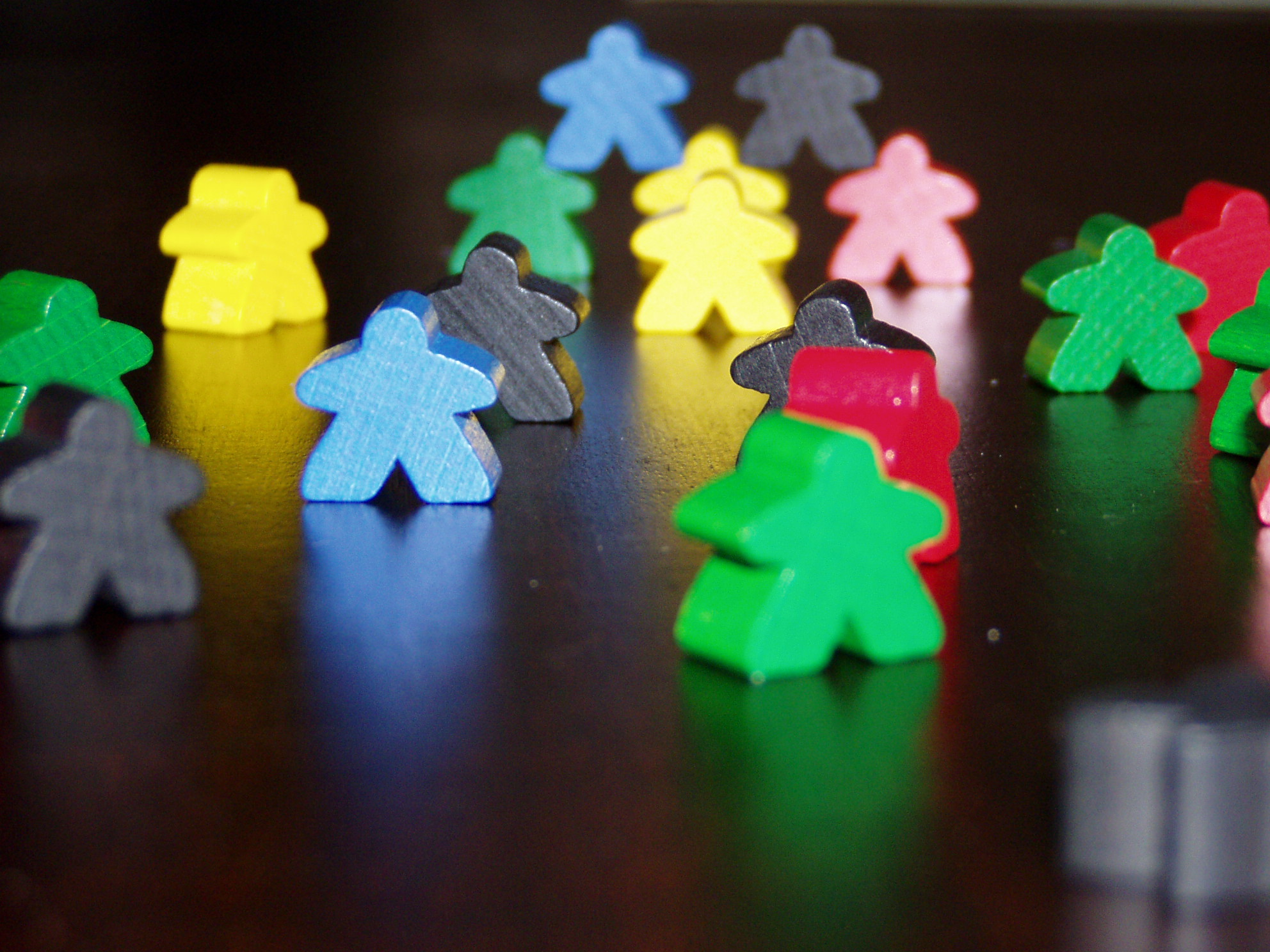
Meeples used in Carcassonne

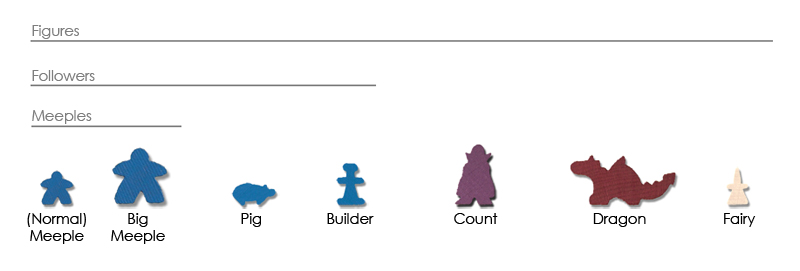
Different figurines used in more advanced variants of Carcassonne, including standard meeples and non-humanoid figurines such as Pig and Dragon

A meeple is a small board-game piece in a star-like shape that depicts an abstracted human form. They are usually made from wood and painted in a single bright color. Meeples are a common component in German-style board games. The word is a contraction of "my people."

== History ==
=== Origins and characteristics ===
The earliest known form of the Meeple was found in the 1984 game Top Secret Spies. More anthropomorphized than many other traditional board game pieces such as pawns that have only a spherical head atop a conical body, meeples have a more humanoid shape.

Carcassonne, published by Hans im Glück in 2000, has been credited with popularizing the modern concept and shape of the meeple as a flat, monochrome, star-shaped humanoid figure. This modern meeple was designed by Bernd Brunnhofer for Hans im Glück and has since become a popular component of many modern board games.

=== Word coinage ===
Although the figures were initially referred to as "followers," Alison Hansel, an American board-gamer, coined the name meeples in November 2000. According to Alicia Nield, owner of the company MeepleCity, Hansel accidentally combined the words "my people" during a game of Carcassonne. On November 27, 2000, Hansel made a post on the Unity Games forums proposing the term meeples to describe these figures. The term was popularized through the website BoardGameGeek.

=== Trademarks ===
Since its coinage, over 40 games have been published with the word "meeple" in their titles. Several games published by large game companies, like AEG and Asmodee, have even published games with the term in the titles, as well as adopting the token design commonly associated with the term, including such games as Mutant Meeples (2012), Terror in Meeple City (2013), the Meeple Circus series (2017-2021), and Meeples and Monsters (2022). This continued until 2019, when "MEEPLE" was registered as an EU trademark owned by Hans im Glück. The 2019 trademarking was objected to by, among others, gaming company CMON. The critics argued that the term has been used in common parlance, and the very shape of the meeple became commonplace in the industry. This resulted in the EU trademark exempting the category "toys and games"; however, Hans im Glück has since registered the term as a trademark in Germany for usage which does include toys and games, and the company also acquired the EU trademark for the shape of the "original" meeple figure as used in Carcassonne. In 2024, the company Cogito Ergo Meeple received a cease and desist for unsanctioned use of the trademark, and decided to change the name of their upcoming game from Meeple Inc to Tabletop Inc, and the name of the company itself to Cotswold Games. This caused concern among game developers whether the use of the word "meeple" is worth the potential litigation. Hans im Glück has since apologized for their overly aggressive action towards Cotswold Games. As the term and concept of "meeple" have not been trademarked in the United States, individuals affiliated with the US board game industry community (Corey Thompson and Marian McBrine) have decided to trademark the concept in the US, declaring that they "have no plans at all to make any profit from this..." and that they "intend to protect the US trademark from predatory action [and] would really love for [it] to be usable by anyone."

=== Variants ===
Some companies offer hand-painted, deluxe meeples, and meeples in some games are customized in various ways; for example, Tiny Epic Quest has customizable meeples that can hold various items such as weapons. Some games, including expansions to Carcassonne, have wooden figurines shaped in non-humanoid forms that are sometimes called meeples; for example, Dixit has rabbit-shaped meeples. Farm animal meeples are sometimes called "sheeples," monsters "creeples," and robots "bleeples." The term meeple has occasionally been used for wooden board game pieces representing inanimate objects like vehicles. More elaborate miniatures used in gaming, such as the ones used in miniature wargaming, are not usually called meeples.

== See also ==
- Chess piece
- Game board
- Miniature model (gaming)
- Worker placement
