= Mutant Meeples =

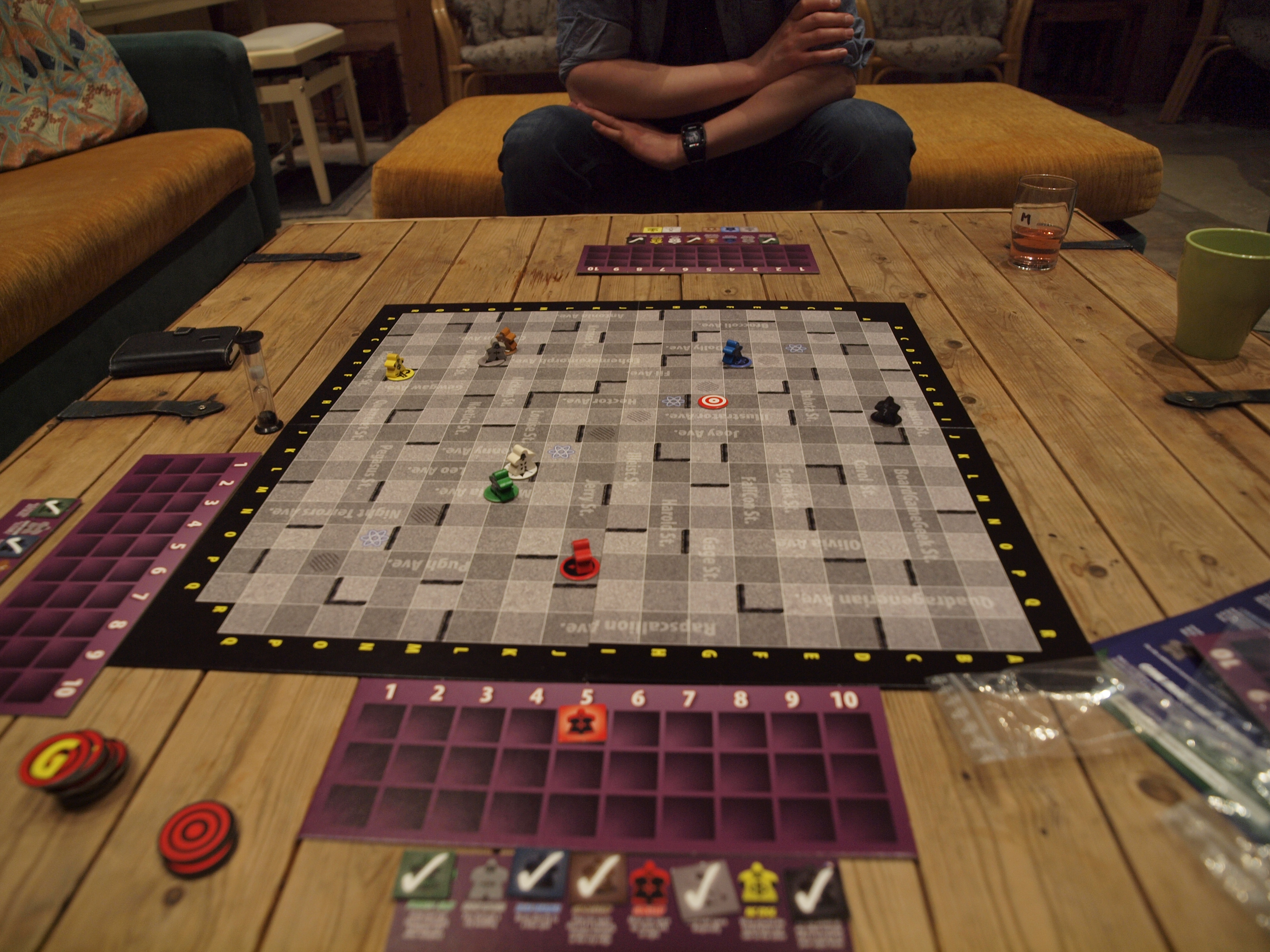
- Mutant Meeples near the end of play.
- Designers: Ted Alspach
- Players: 2 to 6
- Setup time: 5-10 minutes
- Playing time: 30-60 minutes
- Chance: Low
- Skills: Planning, path navigation

Mutant Meeples is a 2012 board game designed by Ted Alspach and published by Beziér Games and Pegasus Spiele. The game has been inspired by Ricochet Robots by Alex Randolph.

== Rules ==
Mutant Meeples is a game for two to six players. The game is played on a rectangular grid of 18×18 squares.

The game has a private detective setting, where a series of crimes happen in a city, and Meeples under the players' control have to reach the crime scene.

On each round, one square on the board is randomly chosen as the crime scene, and the players have to figure out how to get a Meeple there to solve the crime. The twist in the game is that the Meeples do not move freely, instead they use "Super Speed", where once they move, they don't stop until they hit an obstacle (a wall, the edge of the board, or another Meeple).

All players first figure out a possible solution in their minds. Once a player has found a solution, he/she announces it. A solution can involve one to three Meeples, each of which can have up to ten moves. After this, an hourglass is flipped, and the rest of the players have this time to figure out a shorter solution. After the hourglass has run out, the solutions are tried out, from shortest to longest.

The first player whose solution works solves the crime, and flips the token of the Meeple that arrived on the crime scene over, marking it as having joined his/her team. Meeples on a player's team cannot be used by that player any more, but can be used by other players whose teams they are not already on. Thus the game becomes more difficult over time.

The first player to get six of the eight Meeples on his/her team wins.

=== Meeples ===
All the eight Meeples are coloured differently and have unique special powers:

Shortstop
(Brown) Can stop one square short of an obstacle.
MC Edge
(Yellow) Can wrap around the edges of the board.
Forrest Jump
(Green) Can jump over exactly two squares, regardless of what they contain.
Ozzy Mosis
(Grey) Can pass through a wall.
Skewt
(White) Can move one square diagonally.
Sidestep
(Red) Can move one square orthogonally.
Blue Beamer
(Blue) Can move directly to a special "beamer" symbol on the board.
Carbon
(Black) Can use the special power of any other Meeple who has not yet joined the player's team.

An in-built expansion "Sidekicks" adds two Meeples:

Nacho Fast
(Beige) Does not use "Super Speed" but can instead move any number of squares freely. However, has only one move.
Swapmeet
(Purple) Can swap places with any other Meeple, including ones already on the player's team.

Each Meeple can only use its special power once per a player's turn.
