= Maestro (board game) =

1989 board game

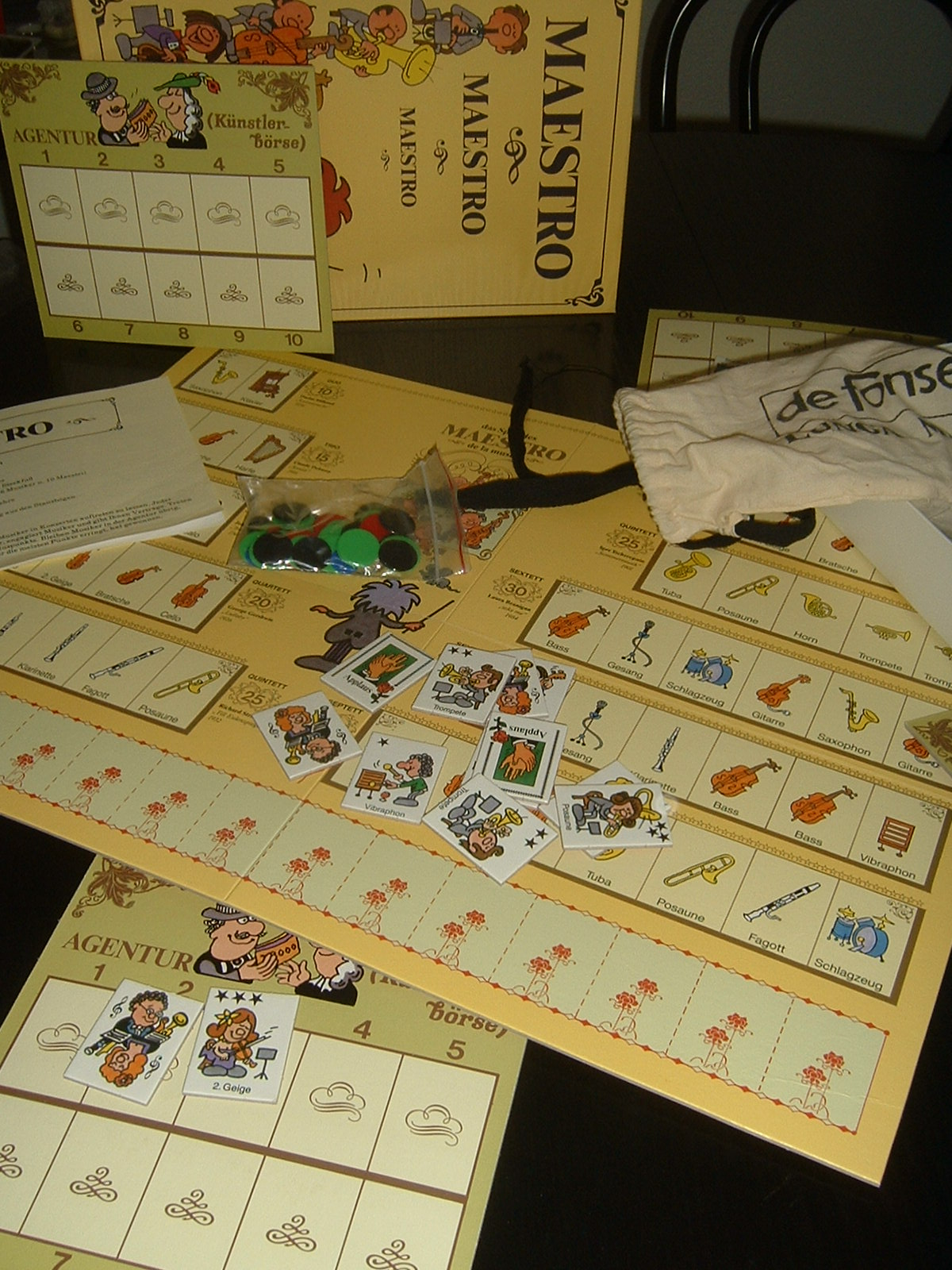
Accessories for the 'Maestro' board game

Maestro is a board game published in 1989 by Hans im Glück.

== Contents ==
Maestro is a game in which a player must fill ten orchestras of varying size with musicians from the player's theatrical agency.

== Reception ==
Brian Walker reviewed Maestro for Games International magazine, and gave it 3 1/2 stars out of 5, and stated that "We found the game to be fun to play and quite skilful, though not something you'd want to spend all night over."
