= Super Trunfo =

Collectible card game in Brazil

- Origin: Brazil
- Alternative names: Trunfo
- Publisher: Grow
- Release date: 1970s
- Players: 2–4
- Cards: 32

Related games
- Top Trumps

Super Trunfo is a collectible card game distributed in Brazil by Grow, which consists of taking all the cards of in play from the other participants by choosing characteristics of each card (e.g., speed, height, longevity). The game accommodates two to eight players and is suitable for all ages, meaning it can be played by any literate person.

== Origin ==
The game is characterized by his simple plastic packaging, which comes in a cardboard box; the rules are implicit on the box label. Traditionally, 32 cards are played, divided into eight groups of four cards (1A-1D, 2A-2D, ... 8A-8D), one of which is the "Super Trump" card which, when played, can be used to take the other cards from the opponents' hands.

The production started in Brazil in the 1970s, focused on cars and other vehicles, and gained popularity in the 1980s. Today the cards have many themes, from traditional ones about cars and planes to newer ones like dogs or superheroes. Many have tried to produce similar games, such as Super Column and 4 Match (which even rivaled Super Trunfo in the 80s), but they are no longer produced.

It can be considered a game of chance because the cards can be shuffled before the game begins, and also because it doesn't depend on any skill from the players, but rather on the luck, what is considered typical of games of chance.

It is an edition of the popular British game Top Trumps.

The digital version of this game (available for mobile devices) is known as Match4app.

== Variations ==
The game have various themes for the editions like for example animals, cars, countries, special editions, sports, etc.,

== Super Trunfo online multiplayer ==
The official multiplayer online adaptation of Super Trunfo is available to play online with other people on the Gametrack multiplayer gaming portal. The service is charged through subscriptions (monthly, quarterly, or semi-annually), but a free trial period is available. This version of the game is faithful to the rules of the original and was made under license from Grow, by the Brazilian game developer Devworks.

== See also ==
- Collectible card game
- War
