= Carcassonne: The Castle =

Carcassonne: The Castle is a two-player German board game. It is designed by Reiner Knizia, although Carcassonne series creator Klaus-Jürgen Wrede is also credited. Like other games in the Carcassonne series, it is published by Hans im Gluck in German and Rio Grande Games in English.

Unlike other games in the series, The Castle is solely designed for head-to-head play. Although the main game mechanic of tile placement is retained, players are also additionally confined by the fixed board layout. The Castle is focused on the interior of a castle that is said to be situated in the middle of Carcassonne, a medieval walled city in France.

A downloadable expansion called The Falcon was released in 2015.

== Gameplay ==
At the start of the game, there are 60 tiles in a board of 76 spaces. The exterior of the board serves as a scoring track, and also denotes the places where players may begin the placement of tiles.

Like other Carcassonne games, each player, on their turn, must draw a tile and play it so that it is adjacent to an existing tile, or to a starting "tile" along the scoring track. Unlike other games, where all features must be contiguous, only paths need to be connected: other features such as fields, towers, and houses, may be placed adjacent to each other. If a tile cannot be placed, it is set aside and not used for the remainder of the game, and the player may draw another tile to place.

After a tile is placed, a player may elect to place a follower onto a specific feature of the tile. Like other Carcassonne games, followers claim ownership of the feature, and may not be placed on an already-claimed feature. It is legal (and perhaps encouraged) to place tiles so as to connect two features with followers together.

With the exception of fields, features are scored whenever they are completed. Roads are considered completed when they are terminated on every end with either a square (a feature found on certain tiles with roads on them - certain intersections do not have squares on them), a starter tile or the castle wall, or if it forms a closed loop. Roads score one point for each tile it spans over (counting a starter tile along the castle wall as a tile) - two points per tile if the road has at least one fountain (another feature found on certain tiles) along its path. Houses and towers are considered complete if they are surrounded on all sides by different features. Houses score one point for each tile they span over, and towers two points.

As with other Carcassonne games, if both players claim ownership of a completed feature, the player with the greater number of followers scores points for the feature. However, unlike other games in the series, if both players have the same number of followers, neither player scores.

Houses are also instrumental in determining the size of their keep: a player places a keep marker upon completion of their first house, and then moves the marker to every subsequent larger house that they score. If multiple features are completed, they may be scored in any order - the order of which, unlike other Carcassonne games, is significant.

== Scoring ==
Throughout the game, if a player scores so as to finish with exactly a certain number of points, they may take special "wall tiles", which allow players certain actions. Wall tiles, for the most part, allow for certain scoring bonuses at the end of the game. Certain wall tiles allow for extra turns, while others can be used to double the scoring of a particular completed feature.

The game ends whenever all tiles have either been placed or are out of play. At this point there are at least 16 vacant spaces on the board. The player with the largest keep (which may vary due to wall tiles which increase the value) increases their score by the largest number of contiguous empty spaces on the board. Followers on incomplete features (i.e., roads, houses, and towers which border a vacant space) are removed, or scored for reduced value if the player has the appropriate wall tiles.

Finally, fields are scored. Fields score three points for each market (a feature found on certain tiles) on the field (subject to normal scoring rules).

The player with the greater number of points is declared the winner.

== Reviews ==
- Pyramid
