= Fjords (board game) =

Board game

- Designers: Franz-Benno Delonge
- Publishers: Hans im Glück; Rio Grande Games; Grail Games
- Players: 2
- Setup time: 1 minute
- Playing time: 30 minutes
- Chance: Medium
- Age range: 8 years and up
- Skills: Tile placement

Fjords is a tile-based German-style board game designed by Franz-Benno Delonge and published in 2005 by Hans im Glück and Rio Grande Games. Unlike some other games in the genre, Fjords is strictly limited to two players. The game is played in two phases: exploration and expansion. In the first phase, the players draw random hexagonal tiles and place them on the game table in alternating sequence to form a map. Tile edges must consistently match with respect to terrain types (clear land, mountain, and water). On some of the tiles they place their four villages. In the second phase, they expand from their villages by placing tokens of their colour on the tiles. The player who succeeds in placing the most tokens (by cutting off the other player's access to tiles) wins the game.

Fjords was republished in 2022 by Grail Games. The new edition includes rules for 2-4 players, 5 new variants designed by Phil Walker-Harding, and art by Beth Sobel.

== Reviews ==
- Pyramid
