= Grow Jogos e Brinquedos =

- Company type: Privately held company
- Industry: Toy industry & Game industry
- Founded: 1972 in São Paulo, Brazil
- Founders: Gerald Reiss, Roberto Schussel, Oded Grajew & Valdir Rovai
- Website: lojagrow.com.br

Grow Jogos e Brinquedos (English: Grow Games and Toys) is a company based in São Paulo, Brazil which produces and markets toys and board games. It is widely recognized in the country for both the diversity of its products and for bringing to Brazil some of the greatest classics of both genres.

== History ==
Four engineering students from Polytechnic School of the University of São Paulo, Gerald Reiss, Roberto Schussel, Oded Grajew and Valdir Rovai, met in the 1960s, and after graduation they decided to join in their own business. After considering several options, such as a clothing company and a brokerage, Reiss returned from Europe fascinated with the war strategy game Risk. Seeing that almost none of the board games available in Brazil were national, practically all were imported, an opportunity arose. In August 1972, in a garage in Mooca, in São Paulo, they founded Grow Jogo e Brinquedos, named after the combination of the initials of the four founders – Gerald, Roberto, Oded and Valdir, which for the sake of "sonority" its letter was replaced by W. After creating their version of the war game, called War, they manually built the boards and offered them to toy stores. After its release in October, the first five thousand units of War were sold out. The success of War led to a second game in January 1973, Diplomacia (Based on the game Diplomacy). Throughout the 1970s, Grow also decided to invest in games for children, with Super Trunfo (Based on the game Top Trumps and puzzles.

In the 1980s, Grow started to invest in licensed products, starting with the characters from Disney in 1982. Even the Brazilian presenters Gugu and Eliana inspire well-selling toys. Grow was also responsible for publishing in Brazil the first edition of RPG Dungeons & Dragons in 1994. Currently, the company produces more than 300 products in its factory in São Bernardo do Campo, with 85% of the production being "cartonizeds" (playing cards, puzzles, and board games) and the other 15% being dolls. Since 2013, it has also been operating in the field of electronic games, with online versions of board games such as War and Imagem e Ação.
