= Stone Age (board game) =

2008 board game

- Box cover
- Designers: Michael Tummelhofer
- Publishers: Hans im Glück
- Players: 2–4
- Playing time: 60–90 minutes
- Age range: 13+

Stone Age is a designer board game designed by Michael Tummelhofer and published by Hans im Glück in 2008. It is a development game with a Stone Age theme in which players hunt, collect, farm, and make tools to build a civilization.

Gameplay includes resource collecting, resource allocation and accumulation of victory points over the course of the play session.

== Components ==
- 1 gameboard
- 4 individual player boards
- 68 wooden resources
- 40 wooden people
- 8 wooden markers in 2 sizes
- 53 food tiles
- 28 building tiles
- 18 tool tiles
- 1 start player figure
- 36 civilization cards
- 7 dice
- 1 leather dice cup
- 1 information sheet

== Awards ==
- 2008 Spiel des Jahres nominee
- 2008 Deutscher Spiele Preis 2nd place
