= København (board game) =

Board game

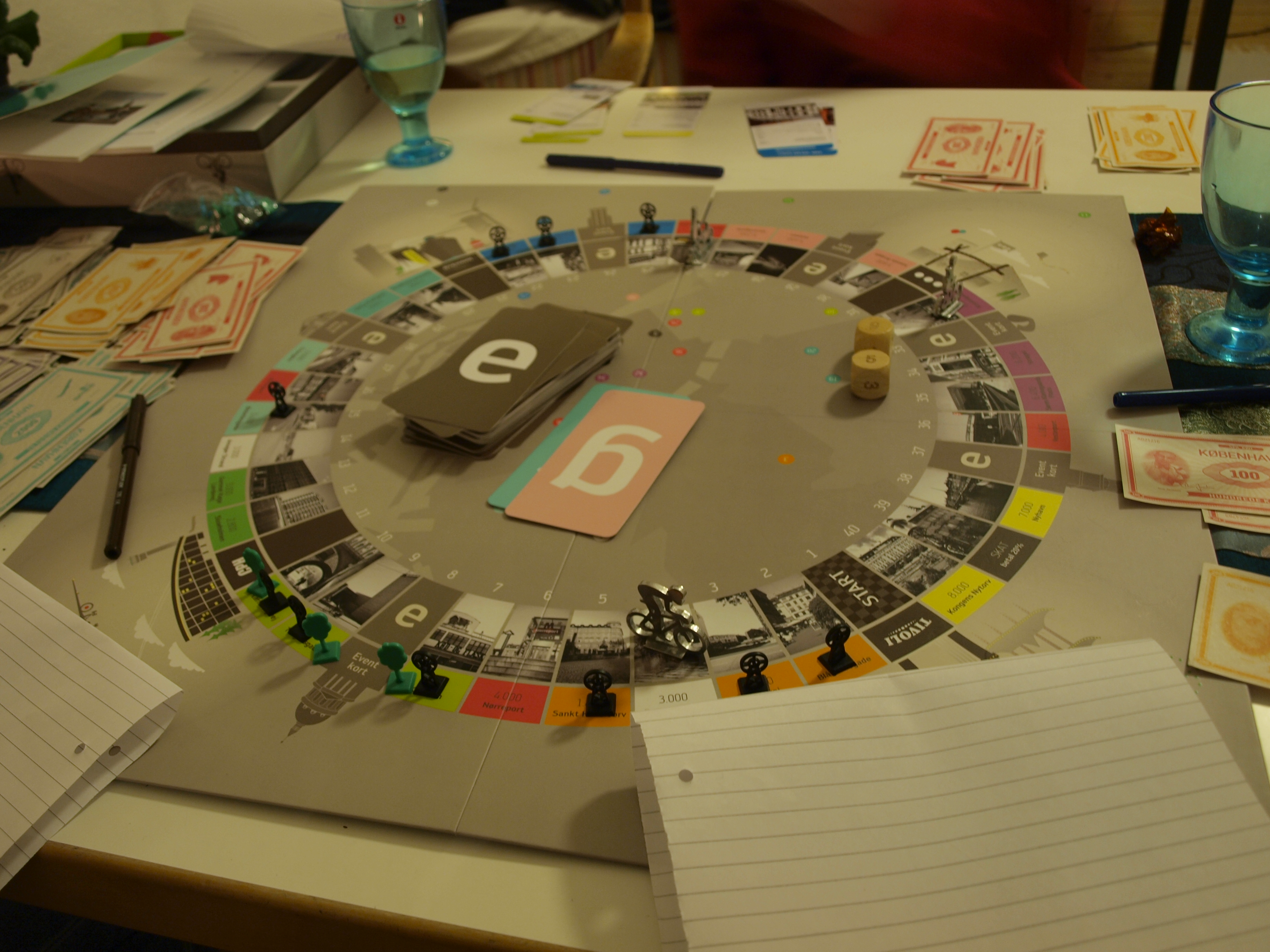
A game of København.

København is a board game by the company We Are Sailing.

København is a direct spin-off from the classic board game Monopoly by Parker Brothers. The game is set in the city of Copenhagen, Denmark and uses the Danish krone as currency, with each player getting a starting sum of 25 thousand DKK.

The game retains most of the basic rules of Monopoly, with some changes. The main change is that when a player lands on an unclaimed property, he/she has three chances:

- Leave the property unclaimed. This costs the player a penalty of 500 DKK.
- Hold a public auction. This awards the player a prize of 500 DKK, and the auction proceeds with the player landing on the property making a bid (which can be lower than the property's value), and incremental bids proceeding among the players until only one player is left in the auction. This player must then buy the property.
- Hold a closed auction. This awards the player a prize of 500 DKK, and the auction proceeds with each player writing down a bid in secret (this can again be lower than the property's value). The players then reveal their bids, and the highest bidder must buy the property.

In København, players build Internet connections, parks and wind turbines instead of houses and hotels. A property starts with an Internet connection, which can later be joined with a park, and finally with a wind turbine. Copenhagen Airport randomly deals out penalties (for pleasure trips) or prizes (for business trips), and Freetown Christiania replaces the jail. There is also only one "chance" category instead of two.
