= Sector 41 =

Board game

- Publishers: Scimitar Games
- Players: 2–4
- Setup time: 5–15 minutes
- Playing time: .5–1.5 hours (player dependent)
- Chance: Medium
- Age range: 12 and up
- Skills: Tactics, and Strategy

Sector 41 is a board game published by David Long and Michael Lachtanski of Scimitar Games. The game became available for pre-order in February 2009 and was officially released in April 2009.

Sector 41 is a turn-based strategy game for two to four players. Game play takes place on a 9×9 grid of face-down tiles, randomly shuffled at the beginning of each game. Players control one mother ship which moves along the edge of the game board. Mother ships can deploy up to three explorer ships onto the face-down grid. Explorer ships are used to discover, mine, and tow deposits of Glynium to their mother ship. According to the game background, Glynium is an unstable power source only found in this sector. Victory is achieved when one player has mined more Glynium than any other player could match. In the case of a tie, the first person to reach that score is declared the victor.

== Development ==
Sector 41 was developed from a compilation of game concepts developed by David Long and Michael Lachtanski, the earliest of which go back to the mid-1990s. The name itself is an homage to the popular Area 51 science fiction theme. Play testing began in late 2007 and lasted until production began in late fall of 2008. The face-down tile set up was conceived of to emulate the fog of war mechanism, popular in many computer games. The developers also encourage players to strategically manipulate the board layout for offensive and defensive purposes through the process of "folding space". This game mechanism was inspired by the Dune novels.

The lengthy play time in the initial play testing lead developers to create the Guardian figure. The Guardian, described below, acts as a mechanism for rewarding exploration, expansion, and reduced play time dramatically. Additional rules for modifying the Guardian's role in gameplay are available on the Scimitar Games website. Michael Lachtanski designed the game's graphics. Many of the space graphics are based on images from NASA.

== Setup ==
81 space tiles are randomly placed in a 9x9 square configuration. The start player, who is chosen by the collective group, selects their mother ship from one of the four races: Fangarr, Mradok, Ryldarian, or Vailyn. Each player places their mother ship with their three explorer ships on the center tile of their respective board edge. The guardian is placed on the center tile of the board. In a two player game, mother ships must be placed on opposite edges of the game board.

=== Space tiles ===
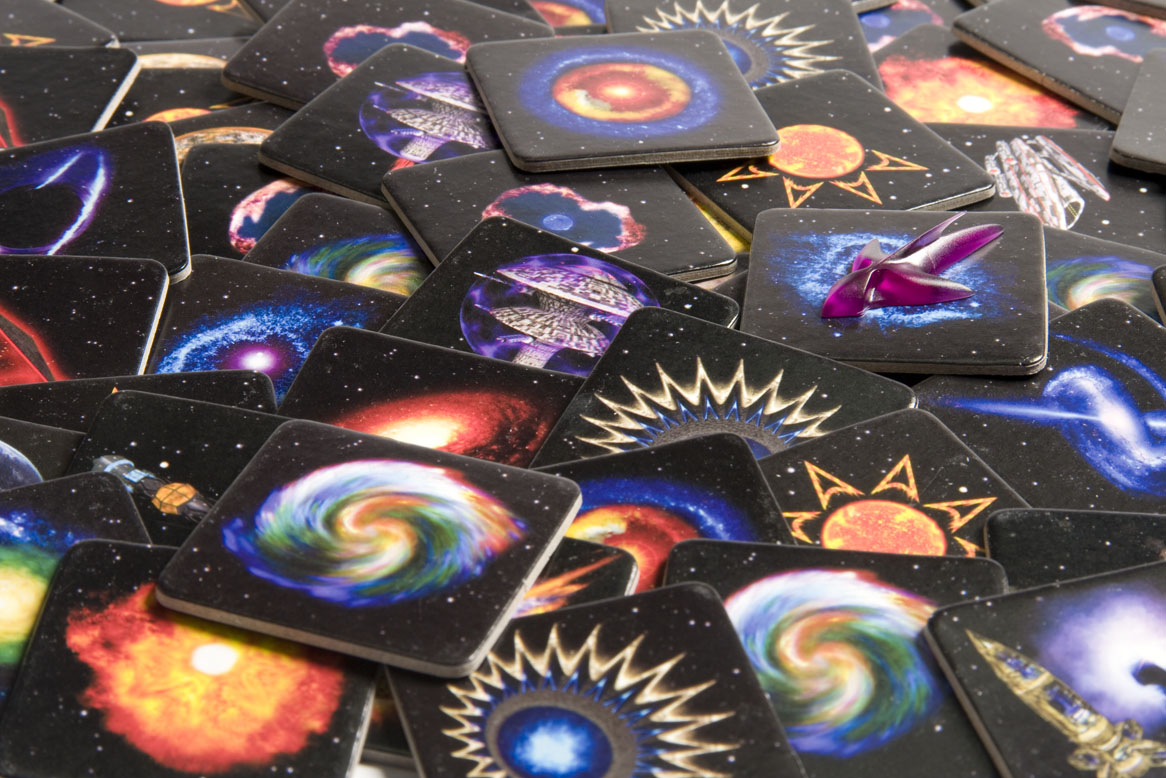
A pile of space tiles with the guardian piece on top

The 81 space tiles are of 22 different tile types. There are a total of eight Glynium planets, and 31 tiles which continue an explorer ship's movement in a variety of different directions. The remaining 42 tiles represent a variety of actions, including, but not limited to: game board manipulation through tile exchange and reorientation, stranding, destroying, and salvaging explorer ships, losing a turn, returning to the mother ship, and destroying an opponents nearby explorer ship using a star base.

== Game play ==
Each player's turn consists of three phases: mother ship movement, explorer ship movement, and Guardian movement.

=== Mother Ship Phase ===
At the beginning of each turn a player may perform one of the following actions with the mother ship: fold space, move up to 2 spaces (left or right), or remain idle.

Folding space restructures the board so that the tile farthest away from the mother ship in the same column is moved directly in front of the mother ship while all other tiles in the column slide further away from said mother ship. In essence, the entire column of tiles is shifted one space away from the mother ship folding space. The tile that is now out of the square of tiles is then moved to fill the gap directly in front of the mother ship. Opposing players may not unfold a previous fold until there has been one full intervening round of play. Folding space can be used defensively to move Glynium closer to your mother ship, or offensively to disrupt an opponents mining operations.

Moving a mother ship left or right may give tactical advantages in folding space in future turns, or aid with explorer ship deployment. Opponents will often position their mother ship's directly across from each other to block each other's potential deployments or folds.

=== Explorer Ship Phase ===
Explorer ships are depicted by small plastic pieces, color-coded to match the 4 races. Each player starts the game with three explorer ships to deploy from the mother ship with the goal of collecting Glynium. During play bad things can happen to explorer ships. They may become trapped in a Nebula, stuck in the asteroid belt for several turns, or even be destroyed in a Black Hole. A player may never have more than three explorer ships in play at any time. If at any point during game play a player can not move any of their explorer ships, then all of their explorer ships are removed from play and a single explorer ship may be deployed from the mother ship on the following turn.

==== Exploration and Movement ====
Each turn a player must move one explorer ship if possible. Any face-down tiles that the explorer ship lands on are explored and turned face-up. Many tiles cause the explorer ships to continue to move, and some tiles cause explorers to jump more than one space away, in which case intervening tiles are not revealed. An explorer ship may never move off the edge of the board. Explorer ships are used to seek out Glynium deposits, on aptly named, Glynium planets. The number of Glynium deposits on a given planet varies from two to four and is represented by colored discs. Glynium discs score points based on their color, yellow scores one, blue scores two, and red scores three. An explorer ship may only tow a single Glynium disc at a time. If a planet contains multiple Glynium discs, multiple Explorer ships are required to fully mine the planet. The game background states that due to the unstable nature of Glynium, explorer ships with Glynium in tow may only move onto previously explored tiles. A Glynium deposit is not secured until the explorer ship returns to the mother ship. If an Explorer ship is destroyed or returned to the mother ship from combat, the Glynium deposit remains adrift in that space, and may be picked up by any explorer ship. Folding space is a common tactic to isolate opponents explorer ships towing Glynium deposits.

==== Combat ====
Combat: Combat occurs whenever an Explorer enters a tile occupied by one or more enemy Explorers resulting in all of the enemy Explorers being returned to their Mother Ship. Combat in the Asteroid Belt is more dangerous and instead of being returned to their Mother Ship all of the enemy Explorers are removed from play instead.

Shielding: When a player has a continuous movement path from their Mother Ship to a tile containing a single one of their own Explorers then that Explorer is considered shielded by the Mother Ship and immune to combat. Explorers may never enter a tile containing a shielded enemy Explorer. Mother Ships can shield multiple tiles with individual Explorers but provide no shielding to any tile containing more than one Explorer. (Shielding was added in the version 1.1 rules)

=== Guardian Phase ===
There are three distinct functions of the Guardian at different stages of game play.

At the start of the game the Guardian is in the Wandering Stage. Any player who moves an explorer ship to a previously unexplored (face-down) tile may move the Guardian one space in any direction of their choice. This includes previously explored tiles.

After the final Glynium planet has been discovered thus deploying the red Glynium disc, the Guardian enters the Quickening Stage. During the Quickening, the Guardian is moved at the end of every turn to the closest unexplored tile of the current player's choice.

Once every tile on the board has been turned face-up, the Guardian enters the Awakening Stage. The Guardian now moves at the end of every turn to a face-up tile of the current player's choice. This tile is then turned face-down and removed from play. This process is known as cleansing. Explorer ships may not enter these tiles, and space can not be folded on any row containing a cleansed tile.

== Future development ==
Presently the publisher and designer Scimitar Games is developing several other games for release and does not have any expansions planned for 2009. However, the developers have stated that if interest in Sector 41 is high, that expansions will be made available.
