= Monopoly City =

Board game

- Publishers: Hasbro; Parker Brothers
- Players: 2–6
- Setup time: 5–10 minutes
- Playing time: 60–240 minutes (1–4 hours) [average]
- Chance: High (dice rolling, card drawing)
- Skills: Negotiation, Resource management

Monopoly City is a board game that is a spin-off of the original Monopoly. It was released by Hasbro in 2009, and made its first public appearance at the Nuremberg International Toy Fair. It was named 'Game of the Year 2009' by the British Toy and Hobby Association at the 57th London Toy Fair. Gameplay is similar to, but more complex than, the original Monopoly.

== Features ==
The game creates a diversified experience where the player can win without owning a Monopoly. The game includes new building types such as parks, water towers, wind farms, schools, prisons, sewage plants, rubbish dumps, and power plants. These exist as physical playing pieces and are placed down by players in the center of the gameboard, to which are mapped the "districts". The complete game set includes the gameboard, 6 movers, 80 buildings, district cards, 25 chance cards, 6 reminder cards, 1 rent dodge card, 2 dice, money pack and trading units.
