= Klaus-Jürgen Wrede =

German board game designer

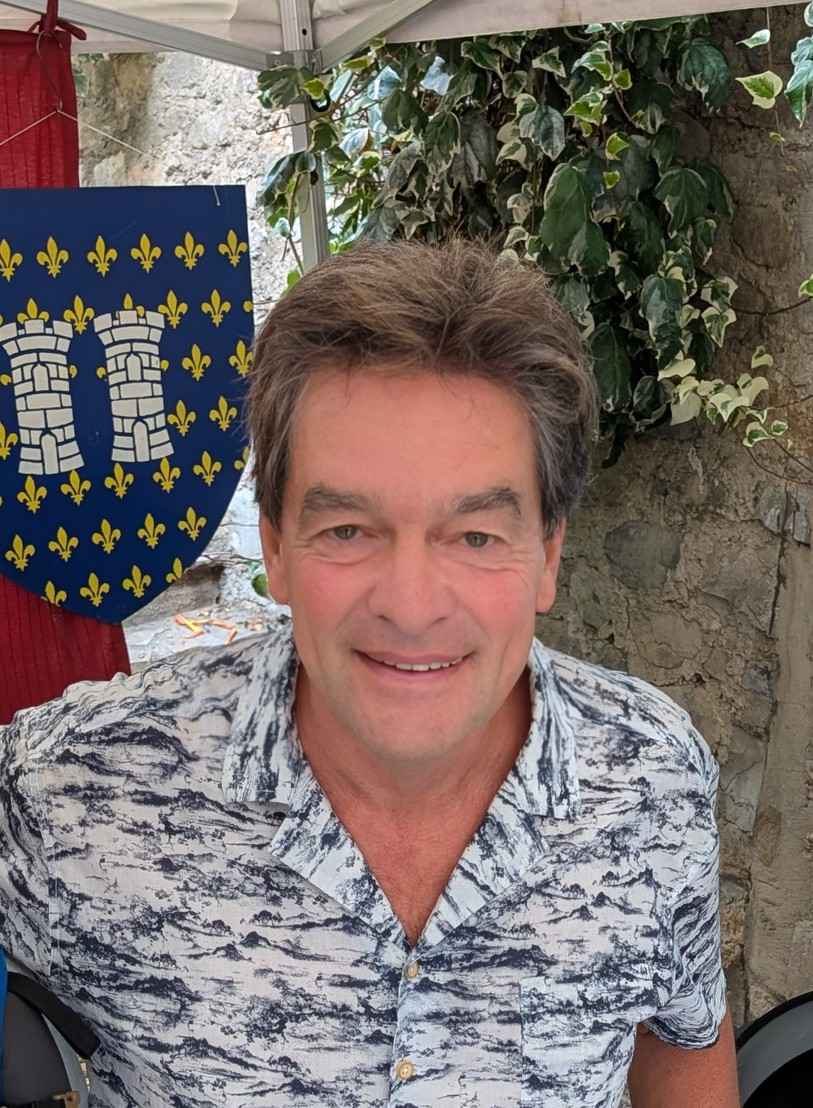
- Klaus-Jürgen Wrede in 2025
- Born: 1963 (age 62–63); Meschede North Rhine-Westphalia, West Germany
- Occupations: Teacher; game designer
- Known for: Board game designer
- Works: Carcassonne (2000) and Downfall of Pompeii

Klaus-Jürgen Wrede (born 1963 in Meschede, North Rhine-Westphalia) is a German board game creator, the creator of the best-selling Carcassonne and Downfall of Pompeii.

== Early life ==
Born to music-teacher parents in Meschede, Germany, Wrede grew up in the town of Arnsberg, Germany. He attended college in Cologne, learning music and theology.

== Game career ==
While on a vacation Wrede created Carcassonne which was published in 2000 by Hans im Glück in German and Rio Grande Games in English. Carcassonne has become one of the most popular games at BoardGameGeek; as of May 2025, of the thousands of games on the website, only Catan has more user ratings.

As a child he played games such as Monopoly and chess. He later played games such as Kremlin, Civilization, Age of Renaissance, Tikal, Ra, and Tigris and Euphrates. His favorite game designers include Wolfgang Kramer, Reiner Knizia, Alan R. Moon, Klaus Teuber, Uwe Rosenberg, and Karl-Heinz Schmiel.

== Personal life ==
Klaus-Jürgen Wrede lives near Cologne and teaches music and religious education.
