= Hans im Glück =

German tabletop game publisher

Hans im Glück Verlags-GmbH
- Industry: Games and entertainment
- Founded: 1983
- Founder: Bernd Brunnhofer, Karl-Heinz Schmiel
- Headquarters: Munich, Germany
- Key people: Bernd Brunnhofer
- Products: Board games
- Website: hans-im-glueck.de

Hans im Glück is a German board and card game publisher. Though many of their own games are language-independent they themselves publish only printings for the domestic market which include only German-language rules; English-language printings of their games have been published primarily by Rio Grande Games, Dutch versions by 999 Games and so on.

They are named after a story recorded by the Brothers Grimm, called "Hans in Luck" or "Lucky Hans" in English, hence the logo of Hans riding a pig.

== Notable games ==
- Die Macher (1986)
- Maestro (1989)
- 1835 (1990)
- Modern Art (1992)
- El Grande (1995)
- Tigris and Euphrates (1997)
- Samurai (1998)
- Carcassonne (2000)
- Amun-Re (2003)
- Saint Petersburg (2004)
- Fjords (2005)
- Thurn and Taxis (2006)
- Stone Age (2008)
- Dominion (2009)
- The palaces of Carrara (2012)
- Russian Railroads (2014)
- The voyages of Marco Polo (2015)
- Stone Age Junior (2016)
