= Deutscher Spiele Preis =

Award for board games

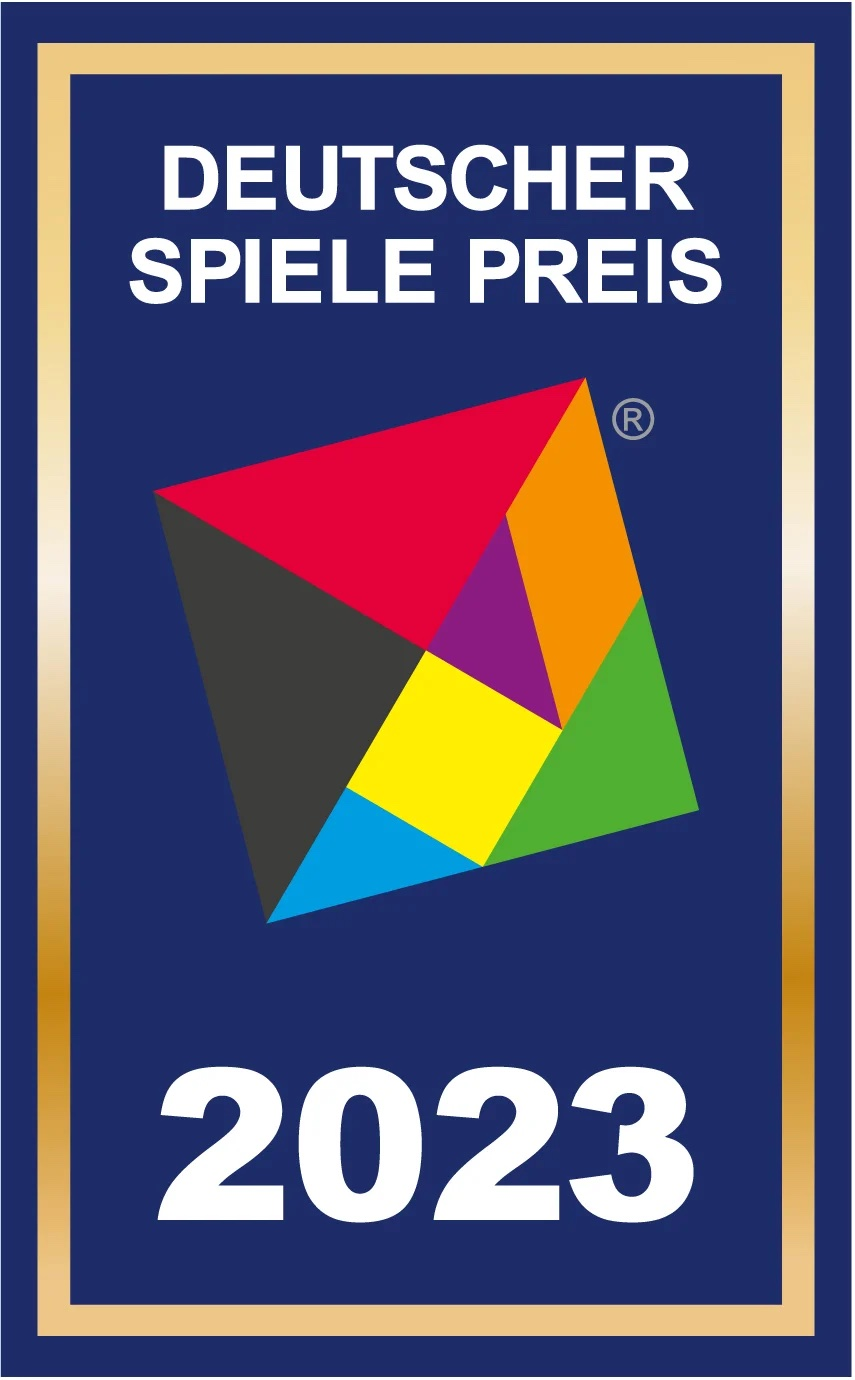
Deutscher Spiele Preis logo 2023

Old logo before 2007

The Deutscher Spielepreis (German: [ˈdɔʏtʃɐ ˈʃpiːləˌpʁaɪs], German Game Prize) (DSP) is an important award for boardgames. It was started in 1990 by the German magazine Die Pöppel-Revue, which collects votes from the industry's stores, magazines, professionals and game clubs. The results are announced every October at the Spiel game fair in Essen, Germany. The Essen Feather is awarded at the same ceremony.

In contrast to the Spiel des Jahres, which tends to be awarded to family games, the DSP is awarded for "gamers' games" with particularly good or innovative gameplay. Although at one point it was not uncommon for the DSP and the SdJ to be awarded to the same game (as was the case for The Settlers of Catan, El Grande, and Tikal in the 1990s), since Carcassonne (2001) only two games have succeeded in winning both awards: Dominion in 2009 and Azul in 2018.

== Winners ==
1990 - 1991 - 1992 - 1993 - 1994 - 1995 - 1996 - 1997 - 1998 - 1999 - 2000 - 2001 - 2002 - 2003 - 2004 - 2005 - 2006 - 2007 - 2008 - 2009 - 2010 - 2011 - 2012 - 2013 - 2014 - 2015 - 2016 - 2017 - 2018 - 2019 - 2020 - 2021 - 2022 - 2023 - 2024

=== 1990 ===
- 1st: Hoity Toity (German: Adel Verpflichtet)
- 2nd: À la carte
- 3rd: Such a Thing? (German: Ein solches Ding)
- 4th: Favoriten
- 5th: Gold Digger (German: Goldrausch)
- 6th: Holiday AG
- 7th: Römer
- 8th: Wind & Wetter
- 9th: Timberland
- 10th: Dicke Kartoffeln

=== 1991 ===
- 1st: Master Labyrinth
- 2nd: Bauernschlau
- 3rd: Wacky Wacky West (German: Drunter und Drüber)
- 4th: Jagd der Vampire
- 5th: Conspiracy (German: Casablanca)
- 6th: Girl Talk
- 7th: Chameleon
- 8th: Duftende Spuren
- 9th: Flusspiraten
- 10th: Columbus

=== 1992 ===
- 1st: Flying Dutchman (German: der Fliegende Holländer)
- 2nd: Um Reifenbreite
- 3rd: Quo Vadis
- 4th: Tal der Könige
- 5th: Schraumeln
- 6th: Cosmic Encounter
- 7th: Minos
- 8th: Extrablatt
- 9th: Razzia
- 10th: Neolithibum
- Best Children's Game: Schweinsgalopp

=== 1993 ===
- 1st: Modern Art
- 2nd: Tutankhamen (German: Tutanchamun)
- 3rd: Vernissage
- 4th: Bluff
- 5th: Acquire
- 6th: Highlanders (German: Rheingold)
- 7th: Spiel der Türme
- 8th: Sticheln
- 9th: History of the World
- 10th: Pfusch
- Best Children's Game: Verflixt Gemixt

=== 1994 ===
- 1st: 6 nimmt!
- 2nd: The Mob (German: Capone)
- 3rd: Manhattan
- 4th: Intrigue
- 5th: Lifeboats (German: Rette Sich wer Kann)
- 6th: Was Sticht?
- 7th: Auf Heller und Pfennig
- 8th: Knock Out
- 9th: Take It Easy
- 10th: Billabong
- Best Children's Game: Husch Husch kleine Hexe
- Best Action Game: Loopin' Louie

=== 1995 ===
- 1st: The Settlers of Catan
- 2nd: Streetcar (German: Linie 1)
- 3rd: Sternen Himmel
- 4th: Mole in the Hole (German: Die Maulwurf Company)
- 5th: Medici
- 6th: Galopp Royal
- 7th: Buzzle
- 8th: Hattrick
- 9th: Set!
- 10th: High Society
- Best Children's Game: Piepmatz

=== 1996 ===
- 1st: El Grande
- 2nd: Entdecker
- 3rd: Carabande
- 4th: Mü & More (German: Mü & mehr)
- 5th: Get the Goods (German: Reibach & Co.)
- 6th: MarraCash
- 7th: Yucata'
- 8th: Campanile
- 9th: Ab Die Post!
- 10th: Top Race
- Best Children's Game: Hallo Dachs!

=== 1997 ===
- 1st: Löwenherz
- 2nd: The Settlers of Catan: The Card game (German: Die Siedler von Catan: Das Kartenspiel)
- 3rd: Showmanager
- 4th: Mississippi Queen
- 5th: Bohnanza
- 6th: Serenissima
- 7th: Ramses II (German: Der Zerstreute Pharao)
- 8th: Terra X (German: Expedition)
- 9th: Beim Zeus
- 10th: Manitou
- Best Children's Game: Die Ritter von der Haselnuß

=== 1998 ===
- 1st: Tigris & Euphrates (German: Euphrat und Tigris)
- 2nd: Primordial Soup (German: Ursuppe)
- 3rd: Elfenland
- 4th: Through the Desert (German: Durch die Wüste)
- 5th: Canyon
- 6th: Basari
- 7th: Tycoon
- 8th: Caesar & Cleopatra
- 9th: Die Macher
- 10th: Freebooter (German: Freibeuter)
- Best Children's Game: Chicken Cha Cha Cha (German: Zicke Zacke Hühnerkacke)

=== 1999 ===
- 1st: Tikal
- 2nd: Ra
- 3rd: Union Pacific
- 4th: Samurai
- 5th: Die Händler
- 6th: Giganten
- 7th: Verräter
- 8th: Mamma Mia!
- 9th: Chinatown
- 10th: Medieval Merchant (German: Pfeffersäcke)

=== 2000 ===
- 1st: Taj Mahal (German: Tadsch Mahal)
- 2nd: Torres
- 3rd: Princes of Florence (German: Die Fürsten von Florenz )
- 4th: La Città
- 5th: Vinci
- 6th: Citadels (German: Ohne Furcht und Adel)
- 7th: Carolus Magnus
- 8th: Web of Power (German: Kardinal & König)
- 9th: Aladdin's Dragons (German: Morgenland)
- 10th: Frank's Zoo (German: Zoff im Zoo)

=== 2001 ===
- 1st: Carcassonne
- 2nd: Medina
- 3rd: Traders of Genoa (German: Die Händler von Genua)
- 4th: Evo
- 5th: Capitol
- 6th: Cartagena
- 7th: San Marco
- 8th: Babel
- 9th: Java
- 10th: Das Amulett

=== 2002 ===
- 1st: Puerto Rico
- 2nd: TransAmerica
- 3rd: Dschunke
- 4th: Villa Paletti
- 5th: Mexica
- 6th: Nautilus
- 7th: Goldland
- 8th: Pueblo
- 9th: Pirate's Cove
- 10th: Pizarro & Co. (German: Magellan)

=== 2003 ===
- 1st: Amun Re
- 2nd: Alhambra
- 3rd: Clans
- 4th: Paris Paris
- 5th: Domaine
- 6th: Fische Fluppen Frikadellen
- 7th: Mare Nostrum
- 8th: New England
- 9th: Coloretto
- 10th: Edel, Stein & Reich

=== 2004 ===
- 1st: Saint Petersburg (German: Sankt Petersburg)
- 2nd: San Juan
- 3rd: Goa
- 4th: Attika
- 5th: Ingenious (German: Einfach Genial)
- 6th: Ticket to Ride (German: Zug um Zug)
- 7th: Maharaja
- 8th: Fearsome Floors (German: Finstere Flure)
- 9th: Hansa
- 10th: The Bridges of Shangri-La (German: Die Brücken von Shangri-La)

=== 2005 ===
- 1st: Louis XIV
- 2nd: Niagara
- 3rd: Manila
- 4th: Ubongo
- 5th: Himalaya
- 6th: Around the World in 80 Days (German: In 80 Tagen um die Welt)
- 7th: Shadows over Camelot (German: Schatten über Camelot)
- 8th: Jambo
- 9th: Das Zepter von Zavandor
- 10th: Verflixxt

=== 2006 ===
- 1st: Caylus
- 2nd: Thurn and Taxis
- 3rd: Antike
- 4th: Blue Moon City
- 5th: Mesopotamia (German: Mesopotamien)
- 6th: Elasund: The First City
- 7th: Mauerbauer
- 8th: Hacienda
- 9th: Augsburg 1520
- 10th: Rum & Pirates (German: Um Ru(h)m & Ehre)

The prizes for Best Children's Game and Best Rules were both won by Nacht der Magier.

=== 2007 ===
- 1st: The Pillars of the Earth (German: Die Säulen der Erde)
- 2nd: Notre Dame
- 3rd: Vikings (German: Wikinger)
- 4th: Yspahan
- 5th: Zooloretto
- 6th: Arkadia (German: Die Baumeister von Arkadia)
- 7th: Imperial
- 8th: Leonardo da Vinci (German: Maestro Leonardo)
- 9th: Thebes (German: Jenseits von Theben)
- 10th: Colosseum

=== 2008 ===
- 1st: Agricola
- 2nd: Stone Age
- 3rd: Cuba
- 4th: In the Year of the Dragon (German: Im Jahr des Drachen)
- 5th: Tribune: Primus Inter Pares
- 6th: Hamburgum
- 7th: Galaxy Trucker
- 8th: Keltis
- 9th: Witch's Brew (German: Wie verhext!)
- 10th: Metropolys

=== 2009 ===
- 1st: Dominion
- 2nd: Le Havre
- 3rd: Pandemic
- 4th: Finca
- 5th: Small World
- 6th: Valdora
- 7th: Diamonds Club
- 8th: Through the Ages (German: Im Wander der Zeiten)
- 9th: Sherwood Forest
- 10th: Fauna

=== 2010 ===
- 1st: Fresco
- 2nd: Vasco da Gama
- 3rd: World Without End (German: Die Tore der Welt)
- 4th: Tobago
- 5th: Hansa Teutonica
- 6th: Endeavor (German: Magister Navis)
- 7th: Egizia
- 8th: Macao
- 9th: Dungeon Lords
- 10th: Power Struggle (German: Machtspiele)

=== 2011 ===
- 1st: 7 Wonders
- 2nd: The Castles of Burgundy (German: Die Burgen von Burgund)
- 3rd: Troyes
- 4th: Navegador
- 5th: Asara
- 6th: Mondo
- 7th: Pantheon
- 8th: Lancaster
- 9th: Luna
- 10th: Strasbourg

=== 2012 ===
- 1st: Village
- 2nd: Trajan
- 3rd: Hawaii
- 4th: Ora Et Labora
- 5th: Helvetia
- 6th: Targi
- 7th: Kingdom Builder
- 8th: Vegas
- 9th: Africana
- 10th: Santa Cruz

=== 2013 ===
- 1st: Terra Mystica
- 2nd: Tzolk'in: The Mayan Calendar (German: Tzolk'in: Der Maya Kalender)
- 3rd: Brugge (German: Brügge)
- 4th: Bora Bora
- 5th: Legends of Andor (German: Die Legenden von Andor)
- 6th: Hanabi
- 7th: Yedo
- 8th: Keyflower
- 9th: Rialto
- 10th: Augustus

=== 2014 ===
- 1st: Russian Railroads
- 2nd: Istanbul
- 3rd: Concordia
- 4th: Love Letter
- 5th: Camel Up
- 6th: Caverna: The Cave Farmers (German: Caverna: Die Höhlenbauern)
- 7th: Lewis & Clark
- 8th: Rococo (German: Rokoko)
- 9th: Glass Road (German: Die Glasstraße)
- 10th: Splendor
- Best Children's Game: Feuerdrachen

=== 2015 ===
- 1st: The Voyages of Marco Polo (German: Auf den Spuren von Marco Polo)
- 2nd: Orléans
- 3rd: Colt Express
- 4th: Murano
- 5th: Fields of Arle (German: Arler Erde)
- 6th: Five Tribes
- 7th: Cacao
- 8th: Machi Koro
- 9th: Aquasphere
- 10th: Patchwork
- Best Children's Game: Spinderella

=== 2016 ===
- 1st: Mombasa
- 2nd: Codenames
- 3rd: T.I.M.E. Stories
- 4th: Pandemic Legacy: Season 1
- 5th: Mysterium
- 6th: Karuba
- 7th: Isle of Skye: From Chieftain to King
- 8th: Imhotep
- 9th: 7 Wonders: Duel
- 10th: Nippon
- Best Children's Game: Leo muss zum Friseur

=== 2017 ===
- 1st: Terraforming Mars
- 2nd: Great Western Trail
- 3rd: A Feast for Odin (Ein Fest für Odin)
- 4th: Scythe
- 5th: First Class
- 6th: Kingdomino
- 6th: Raiders of the North Sea (Räuber der Nordsee)
- 7th: Fabled Fruit (Fabelsaft)
- 8th: Captain Sonar
- 9th: Magic Maze
- 10th: The Quest for El Dorado (Wettlauf nach El Dorado)
- Best Children's Game: Icecool

=== 2018 ===
- 1st: Azul
- 2nd: Gaia Project
- 3rd: Rajas of the Ganges
- 4th: Clans of Caledonia
- 5th: Heaven & Ale
- 6th: Pandemic Legacy: Season 2
- 7th: Clank!
- 8th: The Quacks of Quedlinburg (Die Quacksalber von Quedlinburg)
- 9th: The Mind
- 10th: Altiplano
- Best Children's Game: Memoarrr!

=== 2019 ===
- 1st: Wingspan
- 2nd: The Taverns of Tiefenthal
- 3rd: Teotihuacan
- 4th: Spirit Island
- 5th: Architects of the West Kingdom
- 6th: Detective
- 7th: Underwater Cities
- 8th: Newton
- 9th: Just One
- 10th: Gloomhaven
- Best Children's Game: Concept Kids: Animals

=== 2020 ===
- 1st: The Crew
- 2nd: Cartographers
- 3rd: Maracaibo
- 4th: Barrage
- 5th: Cooper Island
- 6th: Glen More II: Chronicles
- 7th: Crystal Palace
- 8th: Parks
- 9th: Marco Polo II: In the Service of the Khan
- 10th: Paladins of the West Kingdom
- Best Children's Game: Andor Junior

=== 2021 ===
- 1st: Lost Ruins of Arnak
- 2nd: MicroMacro: Crime City
- 3rd: The Adventures of Robin Hood
- 4th: Paleo
- 5th: Aeon's End
- 6th: Everdell
- 7th: Fantasy Realms
- 8th: Anno 1800
- 9th: Praga Caput Regni
- 10th: Gloomhaven: The Jaws of the Lion
- Best Children's Game: Dodo

=== 2022 ===
- 1st: Ark Nova
- 2nd: Cascadia
- 3rd: Dune: Imperium
- 4th: Living Forest
- 5th: The Red Cathedral
- 6th: Witchstone
- 7th: Beyond the Sun
- 8th: Scout
- 9th: Golem
- 10th: Terraforming Mars: Ares Expedition

=== 2023 ===
- 1st: Planet Unknown
- 2nd: Dorfromantik
- 3rd: Heat: Pedal to the Metal
- 4th: Earth
- 5th: Marrakesh
- 6th: Woodcraft
- 7th: Challengers
- 8th: Next Station London
- 9th: Hitster
- 10th: Tiletum

=== 2024 ===
- 1st: Forest Shuffle
- 2nd: Sky Team
- 3rd: The White Castle
- 4th: Darwin's Journey
- 5th: Too Many Bones
- 6th: Revive
- 7th: Harmonies
- 8th: Obsession
- 9th: Keep the Heroes Out!
- 10th: Nucleum

=== 2025 ===
- 1st: SETI: Search for Extraterrestrial Intelligence
- 2nd: Endeavor: Deep Sea
- 3rd: Bomb Busters
- 4th: Castle Combo
- 5th: Faraway
- 6th: Civolution
- 7th: Blood on the Clocktower
- 8th: Slay the Spire
- 9th: Apiary (German title: Astrobienen)
- 10th: Dune: Imperium Uprising

== See also ==
- Spiel des Jahres
- Origins Award
- MinD-Spielepreis
