= Schweizer Spielepreis =

Logo of the Schweizer Spielepreis

The Schweizer Spielepreis is a Swiss board game award, awarded since 2002 in three categories: Family games, Children's games and Strategy games. The game is awarded yearly at the Schweizer Spielmesse in October.

== Awards ==
=== 2006 ===
Family games

1. Fussball Ligretto (Publisher: Schmidt, Designer: Reiner Stockhausen)
2. Pirates! (Publisher: Ravensburger, Designer: Reiner Knizia)
3. Das grosse Dinosaurierspiel (Publisher: Kosmos, Designers: Inka and Markus Brand)

Children's games

1. Nacht der Magier (Publisher: Drei Magier, Designer: Kirsten Becker, Jens-Peter Schliemann)
2. Mäuseschlau und Bärenstark (Publisher: Ravensburger, Designers: Ingeborg Ahrenkiel, Cornelia Keller)
3. Looping Louie (Publisher: MB Spiele)

Strategy games

1. Just 4 Fun (Publisher: Kosmos, Designer: Jürgen P.K. Grunau)
2. Timbuktu (Publisher: Queen Games, Designer: Dirk Henn)
3. Mesopotamien (Publisher: Phalanx, Designer: Klaus Jürgen Wrede)

=== 2005 ===
Family games

1. Verflixxt! (Publisher: Ravensburger, Designer: Wolfgang Kramer, Michael Kiesling)
2. Manila (Publisher: Zoch Verlag, Designer: Franz-Benno Delonge)
3. Niagara (Publisher: Zoch Verlag, Designer: Thomas Liesching)

Children's games

1. Charly Quak (Publisher: Piatnik, Designeren: B. Spence & E. Donner)
2. Snorta (Publisher: Amigo, Designer: Chris Childs & Tony Richardson)
3. Daddy Cool (Publisher: Huch!, Designer: Heinz Meister)

Strategy games

1. Tower of Babel (Publisher: Kosmos, Designer: Reiner Knizia)
2. Candamir (Publisher: Kosmos, Designer: Klaus Teuber)
3. Jambo (Publisher: Kosmos, Designer: Rüdiger Dorn)

=== 2004 ===
Family games

1. "Make 'n' Break" by Andrew Lawson and Jack Lawson
2. "Ticket to Ride" by Alan R. Moon
3. "Dicke Luft in der Gruft" by Norbert Proena

Children's games

1. Geistertreppe by Michelle Schanen
2. "Macius & Achtung, fertig los!" by Wolfgang Kramer u.a.
3. "Monte Rolla" by Ulrike Gattermeyer-Kapp

Strategy games

1. "Einfach genial" by Reiner Knizia
2. "Anno 1503" by Klaus Teuber
3. "Saint Petersburg" by Michael Tummelhofer

=== 2003 ===
Family games

1. "Alhambra" by Dirk Henn
2. "Europatour" by Alan R. Moon and Aaron Weissblum
3. "Peking-Akte" by Thierry Dénoual

Children's games

1. "The Kids of Catan" by Klaus Teuber
2. "Max Mäuseschreck"
3. "Schnapp, Land, Fluss" by Haim Shafir

Strategy games

1. "Löwenherz" by Klaus Teuber
2. "Amun-Re" by Reiner Knizia
3. "New England" by Alan Moon and Aaron Weissblum

=== 2002 ===
Family games

1. Heimlich & Co. by Wolfgang Kramer
2. Ali Baba
3. TransAmerica by Franz-Benno Delonge

Children's games

1. Maskenball der Käfer
2. Villa Paletti
3. Froggy

Strategy games

1. Puerto Rico
2. Pirate's Cove and Nautilus
