= Yspahan =

- The box cover of Yspahan
- Designers: Sébastien Pauchon
- Publishers: Ẏstari Games; Rio Grande Games
- Players: 2 to 4
- Playing time: 60 minutes
- Age range: 8 and up

Yspahan is a 2006 German-style board game by Sébastien Pauchon. It won the Meeples' Choice Award in 2006, came fourth in the 2007 Deutscher Spiele Preis, and was nominated for the 2007 Spiel des Jahres (ultimately awarded to Zooloretto). It is named after Isfahan, and set in 1598, when it became the capital of the Safavid empire.
