= Dicke Kartoffeln =

Board game

Dicke Kartoffeln is a board game published in 1989 by Abacus Spiele.

== Contents ==
Dicke Kartoffeln is a game in which the subject is potato farming, in a stock market game.

== Reception ==
Jonathan Turner reviewed Dicke Kartoffeln for Games International magazine, and gave it a rating of 7 out of 10, and stated that "Dicke Kartoffeln is a good game, but demands serious rules rethinking to reach its ecological potential. I cannot, therefore, recommend it to the player who likes to be spoon fed, but if enough time and care is lavished on it you'll reap the rewards come harvest time."

Dicke Kartoffeln was nominated for the 1990 Deutscher Spiele Preis.
