= A la carte (game) =

A la carte is a board game published in 1989 by Moskito Spiele.

== Contents ==
A la carte is a game in which each player is trying to be a successful chef.

== Reception ==
Brian Walker reviewed A la carte for Games International magazine, and gave it 4 stars out of 5, and stated that "The only real requirement for enjoying this game is a sense of humour."

A la carte came in 2nd place for the 1990 Deutscher Spiele Preis.
