= Favoriten (board game) =

Favoriten is a board game published in 1989 by Walter Müllers Spielewerkstatt.

== Contents ==
Favoriten is a game in which players use betting tokens on horse races.

== Reception ==
Favoriten received positive reviews upon its release. Brian Walker from Games International magazine gave it 4 stars out of 5, and stated that "This favoriten will run and run." It was nominated for several awards, including a recommendation for the 1990 Spiel des Jahres, and a nomination for the 1990 Deutscher Spiele Preis.
