= Clank =

Clank may refer to:

- Clank (Ratchet & Clank), major character in the Ratchet & Clank video game series for PlayStations 2, 3, and 4
- Antonov An-30, airplane with the NATO reporting name "Clank"
- Curt Blefary (1943–2001), Baltimore Orioles baseball player nicknamed "Clank"
- Clank, an onomatopoeia meaning a metallic knocking sound
- A steampunk robot, in the webcomic Girl Genius
- Clank!: A Deck-Building Adventure, a 2016 deck-building game
- Clanker, a slang term for robots and artificial intelligence software that originated from the Star Wars franchise.
