= Löwenherz =

Board game

- Designers: Klaus Teuber
- Publishers: Goldsieber; Rio Grande Games; Kosmos; Mayfair Games
- Players: 2–4
- Setup time: 10 minutes
- Playing time: 60–120 minutes
- Chance: some
- Age range: 10+
- Skills: Strategy, Planning, Resource management
- Synonyms: Domaine

Löwenherz (pronounced [ˈløːvn̩ˌhɛʁts]; German for 'Lionheart') is a German-style board game designed by Klaus Teuber and published in 1997 by Goldsieber in German and by Rio Grande Games in English. A revised edition, titled Löwenherz: Der König kehrt zurück (Lionheart: The King Returns) in German and Domaine in English, was released in 2003 by Kosmos in German and Mayfair Games in English.

The players take on the roles of regents in a kingdom in disarray. Players seek to secure territory under their control.

The game is considered to be one of the three "brothers", as Löwenherz was born from the same idea that brought forth The Settlers of Catan and Entdecker. Like the other two, Löwenherz is critically acclaimed, the original edition having won the Deutscher Spiele Preis and the revised edition having won the Schweizer Spielepreis while finishing fifth in the Deutscher Spiele Preis.

== Gameplay ==
The game is played on a modular board, using randomly placed smaller boards. These boards form a grid pattern, and the kingdom in question. At the start of the game, players place castles with the objective of scoring points by sectioning off areas of the board using walls or boundary markers, each section containing only one of their castles.

The main part of the gameplay centers on action cards. Actions include:

- Placing walls and boundary markers
- Expanding a closed region into other players' closed regions
- Placing knights to protect closed regions—players may only expand to other players' regions if they have more knights
- Collecting money (in the 1997 edition)
- Drawing a politics card, which give the player other abilities (in the 1997 edition)
- Removing an opposing knight from a neighboring closed region and replacing it with one in the friendly region (in the 2003 edition)
- Preventing two neighboring regions from expanding into each other (in the 2003 edition)

Points are scored according to the closed regions they control.

== Reviews ==
- Backstab #9
