= Zoch Verlag =

Board game publisher

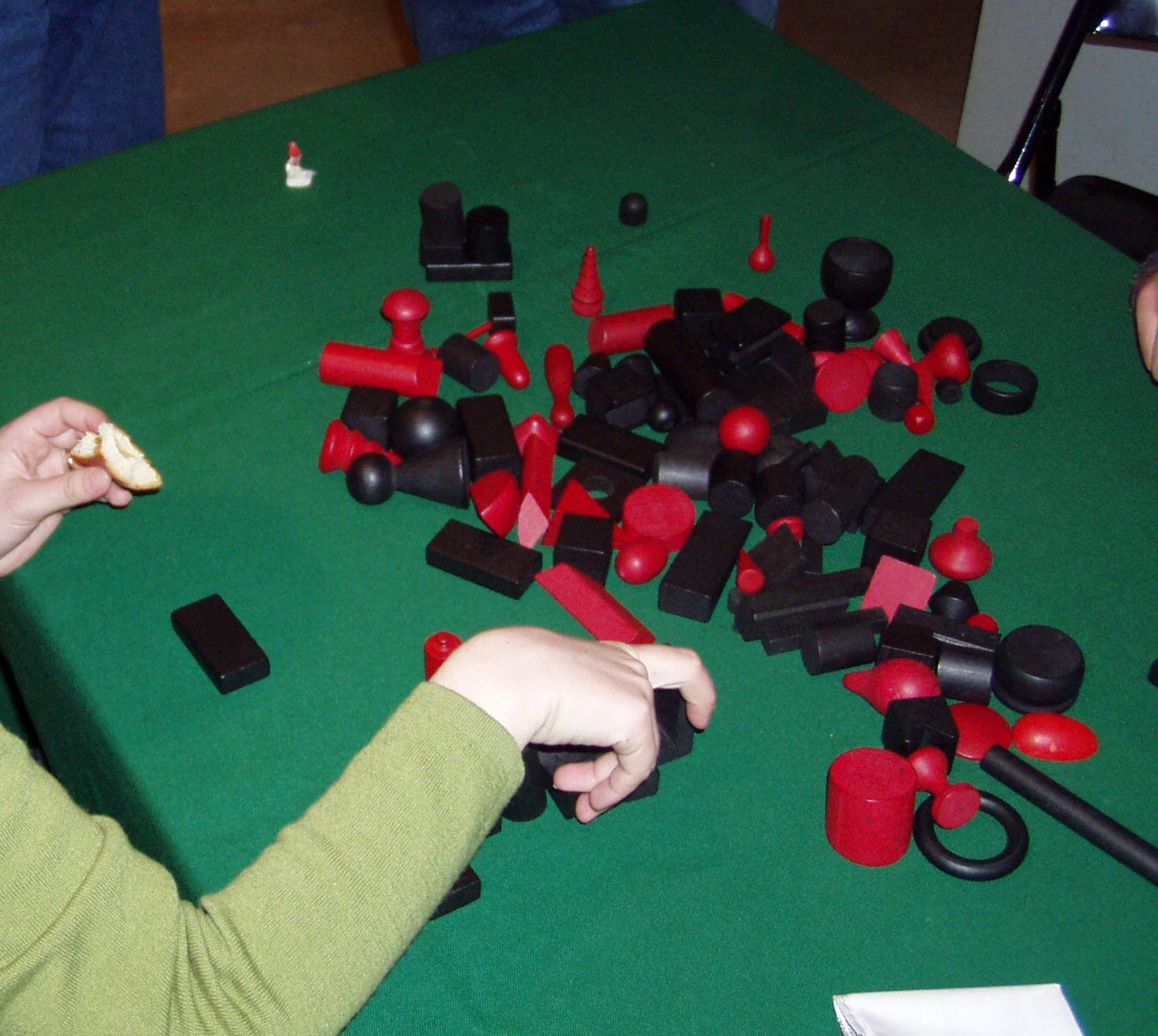
Bandu by Klaus Zoch

The Zoch Verlag is a Munich-based publisher of games. Its pivotal point is games of skill made out of wood - or with a high proportion of wood — for children and families. In addition, it has games in which the tactical skills of the players are demanded.

== History ==
The Zoch Verlag was founded in 1987 by CEO Albrecht Werstein and game designer Klaus Zoch. In 2002 a new shareholder, Hermann Hutter, was added. Hutter was responsible for marketing and sales. Upon its founding, Zoch Verlag released its first game, Bausack.

Zoch Verlag has received many awards, including the Deutscher Spiele Preis, the Schweizer Spielepreis and was awarded "spiel gut". On 1 February 2010, the publishing house was taken over by the Simba Dickie Group and continued as a trademark.

== Notable games ==
- Spinderella
- Niagara
- Villa Paletti
- Manila
- Chicken Cha Cha Cha
- Hamsterrolle
- Heck Meck (Pickomino)
