= Coup (board game) =

Board game published in 1975

Coup (also called Holiday AG) is a board game published in 1975 by F.X. Schmid.

== Contents ==
Coup is a game in which players obtain the most shares in the largest continuous line of cities visited.

== Reception ==
Brian Walker reviewed Holiday AG for Games International magazine, and gave it a rating of 8 out of 10, and stated that "Holiday AG is ideal for 2 to 6 players looking for a quick break rather than a world tour."

Holiday AG won the 1988 Essen Feather award.

Holiday AG was nominated for the 1990 Deutscher Spiele Preis.
