= Piranha Pedro =

Board game

Piranha Pedro is a board game by Jens-Peter Schliemann, published by Goldsieber, Asmodée Editions and Kanga Games. In 2005, it was awarded the Essen Feather.

The main character of the game is Pedro. He begins the game on the centre of a small island that is surrounded by water infested with piranhas. Each player has an identical hand of 12 cards - three of which move him up, three of which move him down, three of which move him left, and three of which move him right. One card for each direction moves three spaces in that direction, one moves two, and one moves one.

One player is chosen to be the initial starting player, and all players choose a card to play. Simultaneously, players reveal their cards. The starting player has his or her card take effect first - they move Pedro the number of spaces in the direction indicated on the card. The next player then plays the effect of their card, and so on, until all cards have been played, or a player is eaten by piranhas.

If a player moves Pedro onto a water space, they must spend a rock. Each player begins with four rocks. They place the rock in the water space on which they moved onto. Rocks can be safely moved over without spending another rock.

If the player has no rocks left, Pedro drowns, and is eaten by piranhas. The player whose card made Pedro drown takes one of the piranhas off the board, which counts as a point towards them. If a card causes Pedro to move onto one of the piranhas on the board, Pedro is eaten by that piranha. If a player moves off the grid on the board, Pedro drowns and is eaten by piranhas.

Once a player drowns, all players discard their leftover stones, then check the cards they did not play. They receive one stone for each card that moves Pedro one space which they did not play, 1/2 for each card that moves Pedro two spaces for which they did not play (rounded down), and none for each card that moves Pedro three spaces. Once a player has been eaten by piranhas twice and receives two points, they lose, and all the other players win.

If all the cards played take effect, then all players choose another card to play, and so on, until a player is eaten by piranhas. If players run out of cards, then they receive their hands back. The game is heavily based around the concept of second-guessing.
