= Around the World in 80 Days (board game) =

2004 board game

- Box cover
- Designers: Michael Rieneck
- Publishers: Kosmos
- Players: 3 to 6
- Playing time: 50 minutes

Around the World in 80 Days is a 2004 designer board game by Michael Rieneck.

== Theme ==
The theme is derived from the classic 1872 novel by Jules Verne.

== Reception ==
Around the World in 80 Days was nominated for the 2005 Spiel des Jahres award, and came sixth in the 2005 Deutscher Spiele Preis.

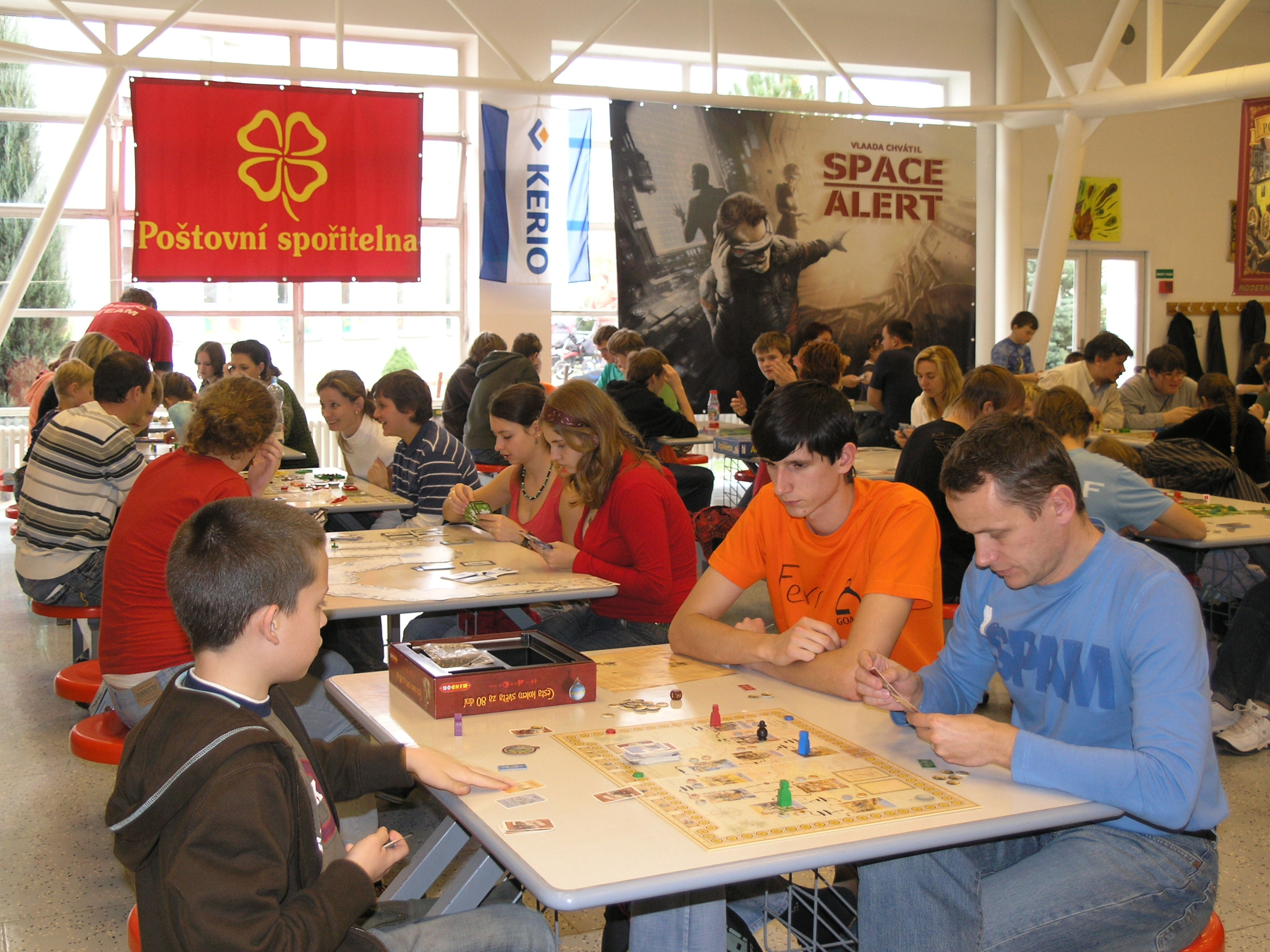
Around the World in 80 Days

== Reviews ==
- Pyramid
