= Container (board game) =

2007 board game

- Designers: Franz-Benno Delonge, Thomas Ewert and Kevin Nesbitt
- Players: 3-5
- Setup time: 1-5 minutes
- Playing time: 120 minutes
- Chance: None
- Skills: Commodity speculation

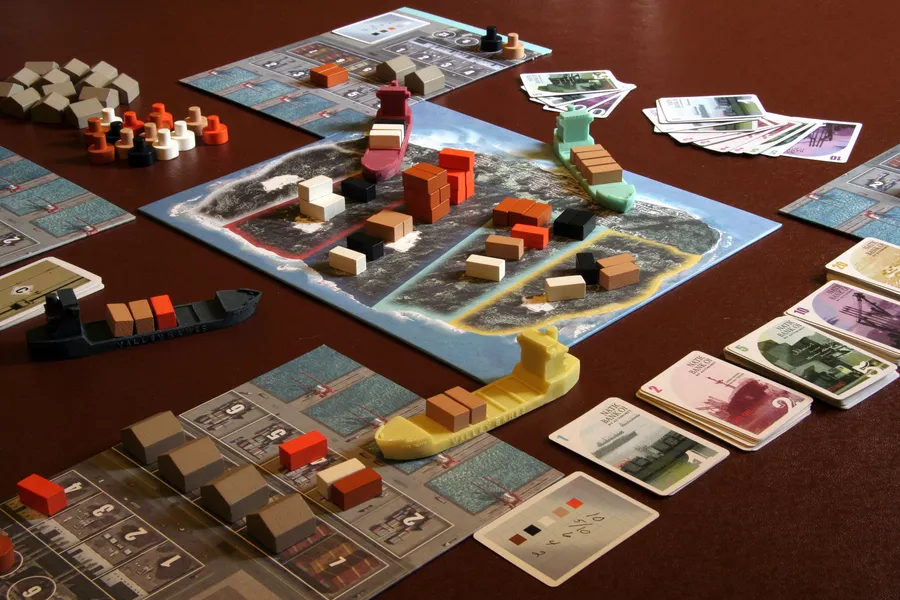
Container board game being played with all game pieces shown.

Container is an economic simulation board game for three to five players. First released in 2007, it was re-released in a special edition in 2017, and as a more compact version by Allplay in 2026. The game is themed around the shipping industry, and the primary pieces in the game are shipping containers.

The game was designed by Franz-Benno Delonge, Thomas Ewert and Kevin Nesbitt with art by Mike Doyle, published by Valley Games, Inc. The players produce, buy, sell, ship and store containers with the general goal of maximizing overall profits. Economic considerations such as supply and demand, cash management, return on investment and efficient use of resources are natural consequences of the game's buying and selling rules.

== Gameplay ==
Each player owns a shipyard with an attached production facility for goods, as well as a ship that can be used to transport goods. The game uses five kinds of (unnamed, but colour-coded) goods, which are represented as a miniature intermodal container (shipping container). Each player's ship can carry up to five containers. Initially each player has the means to produce one container in a single action; actions may be used to expand the player's production capacity (which also costs money). At the time of production, the player pays the player to his right a union contribution, and must place his newly produced goods in his factory store priced at between 1 and 4 currency units. Once containers are produced, another player—not the same player—may use an action during his turn to buy some or all of the containers, placing them on his dockside store priced as he chooses at between 2 and 6 currency units. Players can initially only keep one container in their dockside store, and must spend actions (and money) to buy more warehouses to increase their capacity.

Each player's ship begins the game in the open sea. A player can use an action to move his ship between the open sea and another player's (but not his own) dockyard; when he arrives in another player's dockyard he may buy some or all of that player's containers. A player can also use an action to move his ship between the open sea and a small, industrialising island that the shipping companies hope to make money from. When he arrives at the island, a blind auction takes place between the other players; the player who triggered the auction chooses whether to sell the goods to the highest-bidding player (at which point he also receives the same amount from the bank as a government subsidy, and the buying player places the containers in his own space on the island) or buy the goods for himself at the highest bid, at which point he places the containers in his own space on the island. Thus there is a difference of three times the highest bid in allowing the containers to go to another player instead of taking them for one's self.

The game ends at the end of a player's turn when the pre-determined supply of containers runs out of two types. At this point, the containers on the island are evaluated. Each player is dealt, at the start of the game, a card telling him the values (to him) of each of the different types of containers, from 2 to 10. However, the type of container that he has most of (or one of the types of containers that he has joint most of) is deemed to be oversupplied, and hence worthless—creating a situation whereby he wishes to have the most, or joint most, of his least valuable container. There is also a mechanism by which a player benefits from having at least one of each type of container in his space on the island. Containers remaining on players' ships or in their dockside stores, but not in their factory stores, are also worth money at game end. The player with the most money at the end of the game is the winner.

The game encourages players to compete economically. The convoluted route that the containers take to their eventual destination means that players can lose track of whose production facility an individual container originally came from, and focus only on its immediate and future value to them.

== Reception ==
A review by Matt Jarvis in Eurogamer said that despite its "dull wrapper" with "muddy and messy artwork" which is "ugly" and "drab", Container was "one of the most singular, thrilling experiences" he had ever had. In another review for Tabletop Gaming, Jarvis explained that the distinctive feature of Container is that it "puts total control of the economy in the hands of the players".
