= Hansa Teutonica =

2009 multiplayer competitive board game

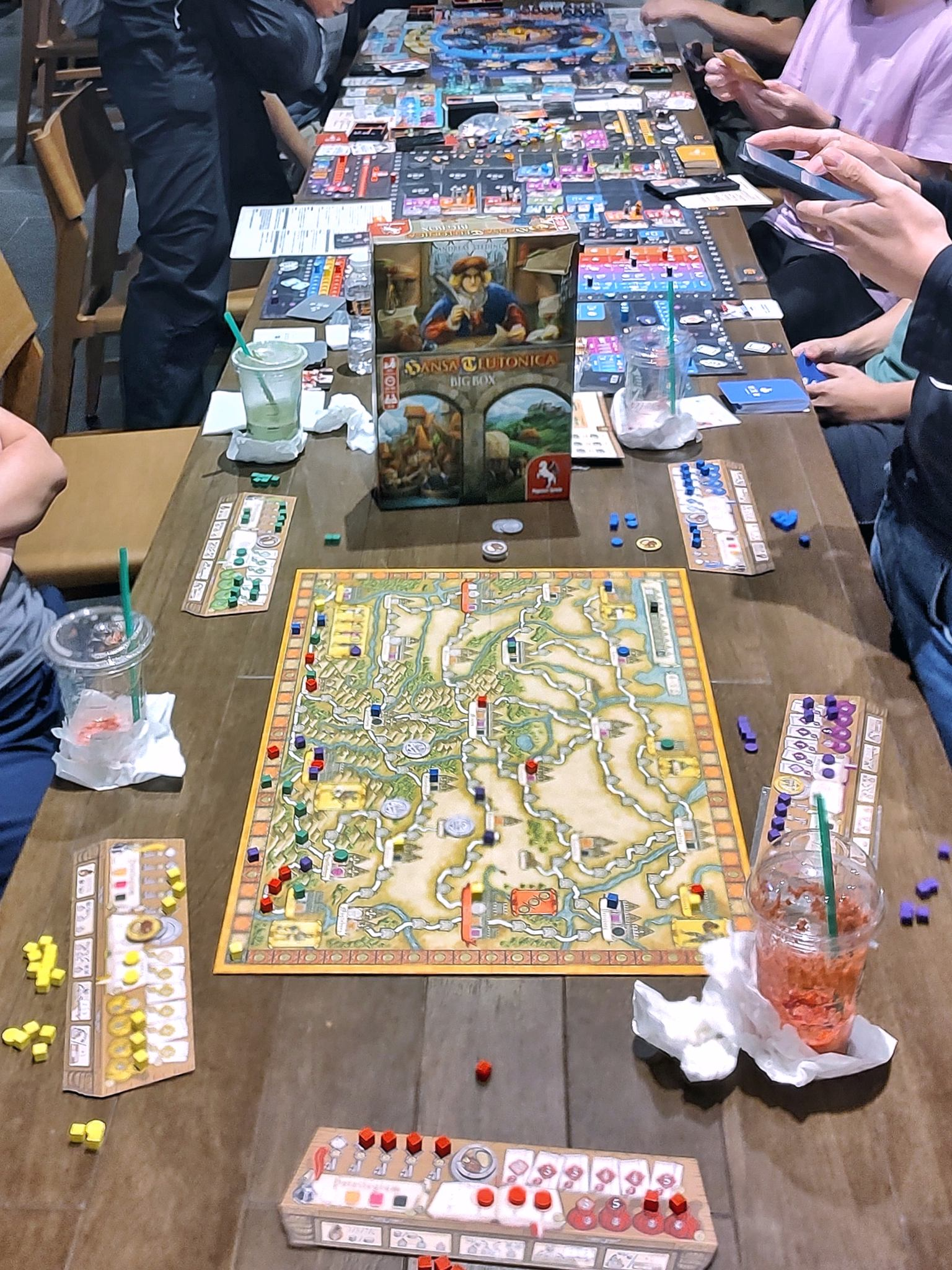
A completed 5-player game of Hansa Teutonica (Big Box version)

Hansa Teutonica is a German board game designed by Andreas Steding and published by Argentum Verlag in 2009. It ranked in the top 10 at the Deutscher Spiele Preis.

The game supports 2–5 players. Beyond the core set, an expansion has been published, introducing new rules and gameplay modes.

== Gameplay ==
The game's theme centers on the Hanseatic League, a group of German cities that formed a trading network in the Middle Ages, and the merchants who traded among them. The objective of the game is to accumulate the most victory points by the end of the game, which can be achieved through various methods. Each player must balance accumulating these points with enhancing their capacity to secure additional points in later stages of the game.

== Honors and awards ==
- Meeples' Choice Award (2009)
- Golden Geek Best Innovative Board Game Nominee2010
- Golden Geek Best Strategy Board Game Winner (2010)
- Golden Geek Board Game of the Year Winner (2010)
- International Gamers Awards - General Strategy; Multi-player Nominee (2010)
- JoTa Best Heavy Board Game Nominee (2010)
- Spiel der Spiele Hit für Experten Recommended (2010)
- Spiel des Jahres Recommended (2010)
- Nederlandse Spellenprijs Nominee (2011)
- Nederlandse Spellenprijs Winner (2011)
