= Roll Player =

Fantasy board game

- Designers: Keith Matejka
- Publishers: Thunderworks Games
- Publication: 2016; 10 years ago
- Players: 1-4
- Playing time: 60-90 minutes
- Age range: 10+
- Website: www.thunderworksgames.com/roll-player.html

Roll Player is a euro-style board game designed by Keith Matejka and published in 2016 by Thunderworks Games. In the game, players compete to design the best fantasy adventurer, through dice rolling and card drafting mechanics.

== Development ==
The game was funded through Kickstarter crowdfunding platform, after that the game received two expansions (Roll Player: Monsters & Minions in 2018 and Roll Player: Fiends & Familiars in 2020).

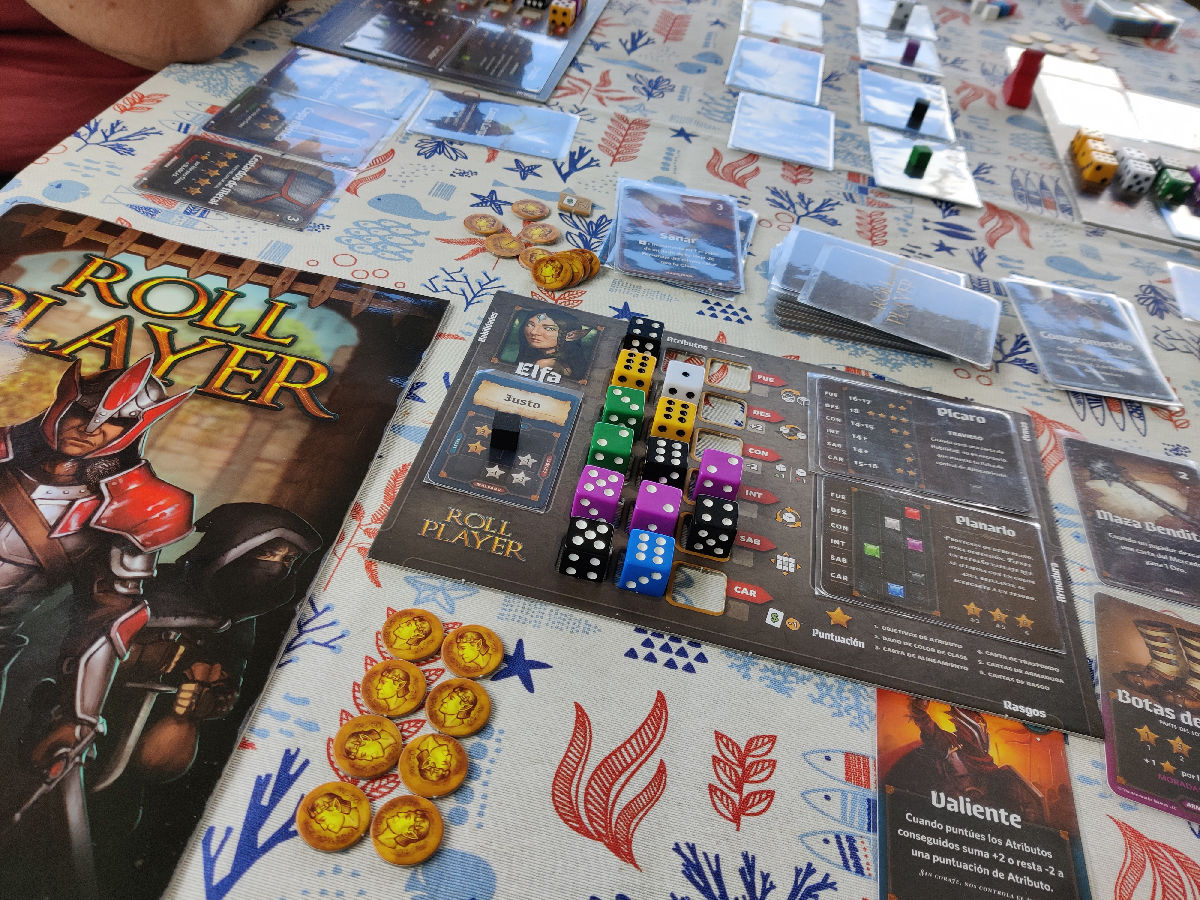
Playing

== Reception ==
The game received generally favorable reviews.

== Awards ==
- 2016 Golden Geek Most Innovative Board Game Nominee

== Spin-offs ==
Several other games share the same setting (universe) as Roll Player, including Cartographers (2019), Lockup: A Roll Player Tale (2019) and Roll Player: Adventures (2021).

In 2021 Thunderworks Games released Roll Player Adventures, a cooperative storybook game set in the World of Ulos giving players the opportunity to import their generated characters from Roll Player and take them on adventures. Roll Player Adventures blends dice manipulation puzzles with choice-driven narrative. Matthew Kearns also found the storyline compelling. James Wolff of Board Game Quest scored the game a 4.5/5 sharing, "Roll Player Adventures gives players interesting choices as they progress through a fantastic choose-your-own-adventure story with engaging dice manipulation puzzles in a deep and vibrant world."

== See also ==
- Cartographers (board game)
