= Zooloretto =

2007 board game

- Cover of the game
- Designers: Michael Schacht
- Publishers: Rio Grande Games (USA); Abacus Spiele (Germany); Lautapelit.fi (Skandinavia); G3 (Poland); Hobby World (Russia); Korea Boardgames (Korea); Filosofia Éditions (France) playgo (Hong Kong)); 999 Games (Dutch); Z-Man Games (USA); White Goblin Games (Dutch)
- Players: 2–5
- Setup time: 5 minutes
- Playing time: 30–45 minutes
- Chance: Medium
- Age range: 8+
- Skills: Set collection, Tile Placement

Zooloretto is a board game designed by Michael Schacht, published in 2007 by Abacus Spiele and in English by Rio Grande Games. The premise of the game is that each player is the owner of a zoo, and must collect animals in order to attract visitors to their zoo (thus scoring points to win the game). Having full, or nearly full, animal enclosures scores more points. However, if a player has too many animals such that they must be stored in their "barn", this causes them to lose points. Vending stalls also offer a means for players to score points with enclosures that are not full.

The method that players use to collect animals is based on the mechanics of the card game Coloretto (also designed by Michael Schacht).

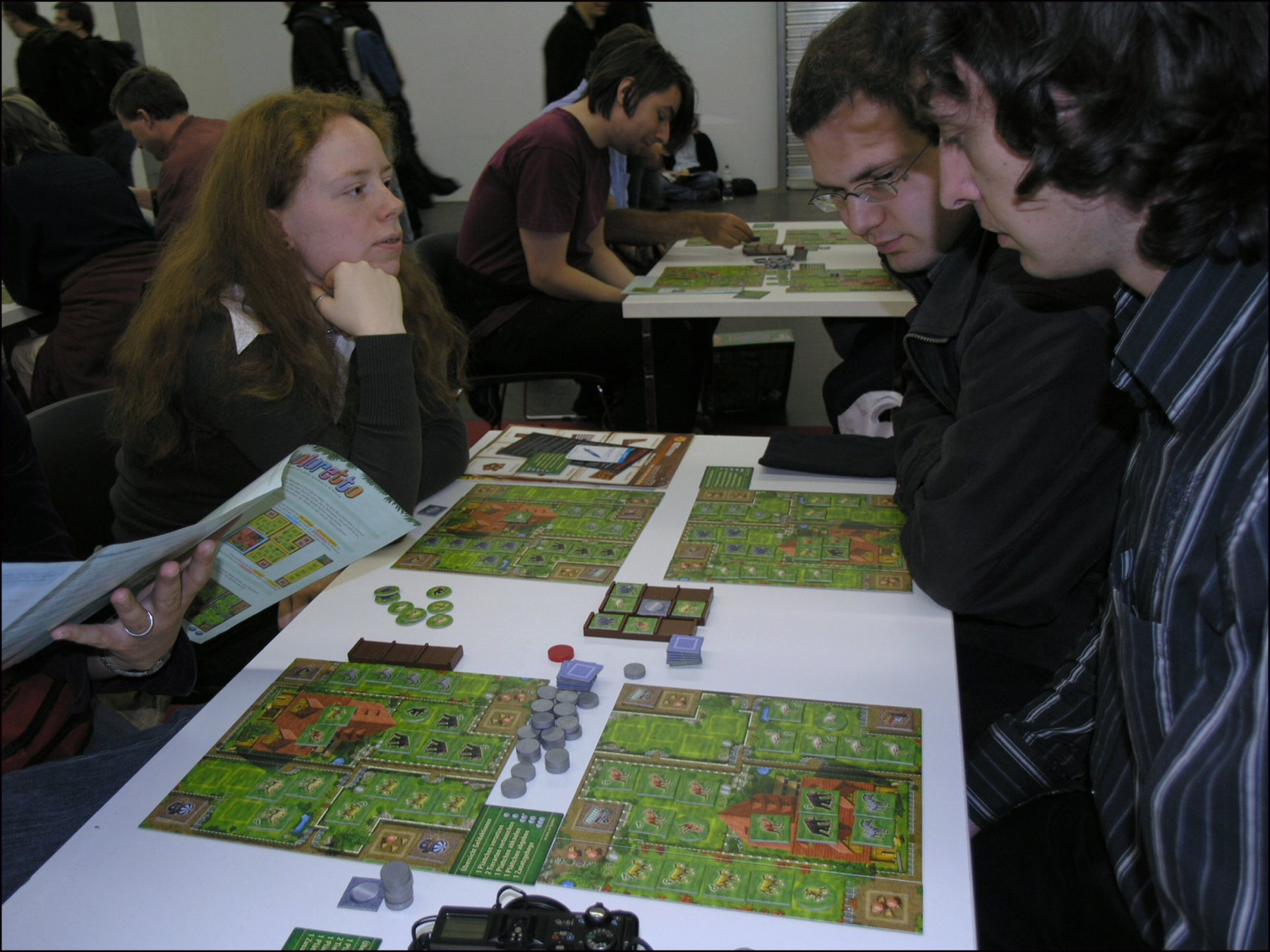
A game of Zooloretto at Essen 2007

== Expansions and spin-offs ==
Three large expansions have been published, XXL, Exotic, and Boss. Numerous small expansions have been published, many of which are available for download (at no cost) at the publisher's website. These include extra animal enclosures, a petting zoo, restaurant, souvenir shop, and pavilions, each of which offers different opportunities for players to score points or money. An additional large expansion, Aquaretto, can be played as a stand-alone game or in combination with Zooloretto.

== Digital versions ==
An iPhone and iPod Touch version was developed by Spinbottle games and published by Chillingo in May 2009.

Zooloretto for PC (including digitally via Steam) was developed by White Bear Studios and published in 2011. Nintendo DS and Wii versions were in deployment but canceled The game has a single player campaign mode and a multiplayer mode. The game can be played (just like the board game) with five local players, with no online option.

== Animals ==
- Flamingo
- Camel
- Leopard
- Elephant
- Panda
- Chimpanzee
- Zebra
- Kangaroo
- Lion
- Rabbit

NOTE: The lion is on the King of the Beasts edition of the game. Both the Lion and Rabbit are available as a Promo from their webstore.

== Awards ==
- Winner of the Spiel des Jahres 2007
- Winner of the 2007 Golden Geek Awards for Best Family Game and Best Children's Game
- 5th place Deutscher Spielepreis 2007
- Finalist Game of the Year in Finland 2007
- Spieleblitzlichter 2007 in Austria
- Japan Boardgame Prize 2007 for Best Foreign Game for Beginners

== Reviews ==
- Family Games: The 100 Best
