= Essen Feather =

German board game award

The Essen Feather (German: Essener Feder) is an award for German-style board games, given at the Deutscher Spiele Preis ceremony at the Spiel game fair in Essen, Germany. The award is given to games with well-written rules, as it was felt that too many good games were spoiled by incomprehensible rules.

The trophy is a brass goose quill and inkwell on a chessboard.

== Winners ==
- 1981 Focus
- 1982 Dark Tower
- 1983 Giganten
- 1984 Inka
- 1985 Wildlife Adventure
- 1986 Das Blaue Amulett
- 1987 Spy & Spy
- 1988 Holiday AG
- 1989 No game was found worthy of the award
- 1990 Lifestyle
- 1991 Hotu Matua
- 1992 Coco Crazy
- 1993 Acquire
- 1994 New Games in Old Rome (German: Neue Spiele im Alten Rom)
- 1995 The Settlers of Catan
- 1996 Detroit-Cleveland Grand Prix (German: Top Race)
- 1997 Mississippi Queen
- 1998 Die Macher
- 1999 Union Pacific
- 2000 Taj Mahal
- 2001 Entdecker
- 2002 Puerto Rico
- 2003 Alhambra
- 2004 Fifth Avenue
- 2005 Piranha Pedro
- 2006 Nacht der Magier
- 2007 Chateau Roquefort
- 2008 Jamaica
- 2009 Diamonds Club
- 2010 At the Gates of Loyang
- 2011 Expedition Sumatra
- 2012 Grimoire
- 2013 The Palaces of Carrara
- 2014 Linko!
- 2015 Alchemists
- 2016 My First Stone Age
