= Forest Shuffle =

2023 card game

- Designers: Kosch
- Illustrators: Toni Llobet, Judit Piella
- Publishers: Lookout Games
- Publication: 2023
- Players: 2–5
- Playing time: 60 minutes
- Age range: 10+

Forest Shuffle (German: Mischwald) is a 2023 card game designed by Kosch and published by Lookout Games. Players build personal forests by placing tree cards and attaching plant and animal cards to them in order to create scoring combinations. It was first released in October 2023, with English and German copies available at SPIEL '23. The game received positive reviews and won the 2024 Deutscher Spiele Preis; it was also included on the recommendation list for the 2024 Kennerspiel des Jahres.

== Gameplay ==
The game begins with a shared clearing in the center of the table, around which each player builds a separate forest. On each turn, a player either draws two cards or plays one card, trying to assemble the highest-scoring forest before the appearance of the third winter card ends the game. Tree cards are played on their own and create spaces for other cards, with each tree able to hold cards on its four sides. Flora and fauna cards are split into two halves, and when one is played, one half is placed on a side of an existing tree while the other is tucked underneath, so players must choose which half to keep in play. Cards are usually paid for by discarding cards from hand to the clearing. Players may later draw from that clearing instead of from the deck, which provides the game's main form of player interaction.

During setup, the three winter cards are seeded into the final third of the deck, and the game ends immediately when the third is revealed. Players then score points from species combinations, tree-related bonuses, and other card effects throughout their forests.

== Development ==
Kosch said that the design originated in February 2022, when he set out to create a card game that would appeal to his biologist girlfriend and match both her field and her taste in games. He described the goal as something simple to learn but still strategically deep, and said that a first prototype was completed within two days. The prototype was presented at a game-author meeting in Göttingen in June 2022, where it quickly attracted strong interest from Lookout Games. The design, then titled Waldwunder, entered editorial development soon afterward, and Kosch later said that prototype files were exchanged and the game was refined in weekly video calls. Although the prototype was already close to the published game, it went through extensive iteration. Over about a year, around 25 prototypes were developed and tested. One notable change concerned the ending: the three winter cards were moved from the lower half of the deck to the lower third, making the finale less abrupt while still preserving uncertainty. The game's content was also revised repeatedly during development, with species added and removed and effects, bonuses, and scoring conditions altered, adjusted, or redesigned.

The visual presentation was developed with an emphasis on naturalistic depictions of animals, plants, and trees. Toni Llobet provided the illustrations, Judit Piella created the card backgrounds, and Klemens Franz was responsible for the card layout. About 40 alternative card designs were produced and discarded during the process, with symbols and background colors repeatedly reworked before the final version was settled on.

== Publication ==
Lookout Games announced the game in June 2023 and published it later that year. The first edition was scheduled for release in October 2023, and around SPIEL '23 the publisher highlighted both German and English editions, with English-language demonstration tables and English retail copies available at its Hall 3 booth. The game was also the first title in the publisher's GreenLine series, which emphasized plastic-free production and the use of FSC-certified paper. In keeping with that approach, the cards were wrapped in paper instead of cellophane, the usual shrink wrap was replaced by paper adhesive dots, and the detailed card appendix was made available digitally, with 14 help cards included in the box.

== Expansions and related games ==
Later additions to the game included the expansions Forest Shuffle: Alpine and Forest Shuffle: Woodland Edge in 2024, Forest Shuffle: Exploration in 2025, and the stand-alone related game Forest Shuffle: Dartmoor in 2025.

=== Forest Shuffle: Alpine ===
Released in 2024, Forest Shuffle: Alpine is a 36-card expansion that is shuffled into the base game and introduces two new tree species.

=== Forest Shuffle: Woodland Edge ===
Also released in 2024, Forest Shuffle: Woodland Edge is a 36-card expansion centered on edge-of-forest habitats. It introduces bushes as additional placement spaces for species cards.

=== Forest Shuffle: Exploration ===
Released in 2025, Forest Shuffle: Exploration is a 55-card expansion that adds asymmetrical caves, an official Automa deck for solo play, 12 challenges, and 15 special cards. The Automa was credited to Anna Triebert.

=== Forest Shuffle: Dartmoor ===
Released in 2025, Forest Shuffle: Dartmoor is a stand-alone game in the same series rather than an expansion. It uses the same basic game mechanics as the original game, but shifts the setting to the moorland landscape of Dartmoor and adds new terrain cards and drafted caves.

== Reception ==
The game received generally positive reviews. Reviewers highlighted the brisk turn structure and the tension created by the shared clearing, where cards discarded to pay costs can later be taken by other players. They also noted that the game's gentle woodland presentation concealed a sharper and more tactical design than it first appeared to be. Other reviews praised the thematic fit between the subject matter and the card-placement system, noting that the basic rules were easy to grasp even though the large number of card effects made the game richer over repeated plays. Reviewers also pointed to the variety created by the deck and the different ways cards could reinforce one another from game to game.

Criticism focused in part on the endgame and presentation. Reviewers found the final scoring lengthy and sometimes tedious, with many individual cards needing to be counted, and also cited the iconography and card text load as potentially intimidating. The game was also described as requiring a surprisingly large amount of table space for a card game, and some felt that the payoff of final scoring was less compelling than the tactical decisions during play. Some reviewers argued that the game's friendly appearance could be misleading for new players, because it hides a considerable amount of optimization pressure and can produce analysis paralysis. Others noted that, beyond the clearing and a few competitive scoring conditions, direct interaction is limited, and that some card combinations or strategies can feel notably stronger than others.

== Awards and honors ==
- Won the 2024 Deutscher Spiele Preis.
- Included on the recommendation list for the 2024 Kennerspiel des Jahres.
- Won the 2024 Nederlandse Spellenprijs in the Kenner category.
- Won the 2024 Gouden Ludo family game award.
