= Niagara (board game) =

German-style board game

- Box cover
- Designers: Thomas Liesching
- Publishers: Zoch Verlag; Rio Grande Games
- Players: 3–5
- Setup time: < 5 minutes
- Playing time: 30-45 minutes
- Age range: 8 and up

Niagara is a German-style board game designed by Thomas Liesching and published in 2004 by Zoch Verlag and Rio Grande Games. In Niagara, which is set in the Niagara Falls, players collect, transport, and steal gems. Upon its release, the game won several awards, including the 2005 Spiel des Jahres.

== Gameplay ==
The game is played on a hinged board designed to sit atop the game box and represent Niagara Falls as a flap hanging over the box edge. The river is represented using clear plastic discs in a grooved surface, allowing board spaces to move downstream toward the waterfall.

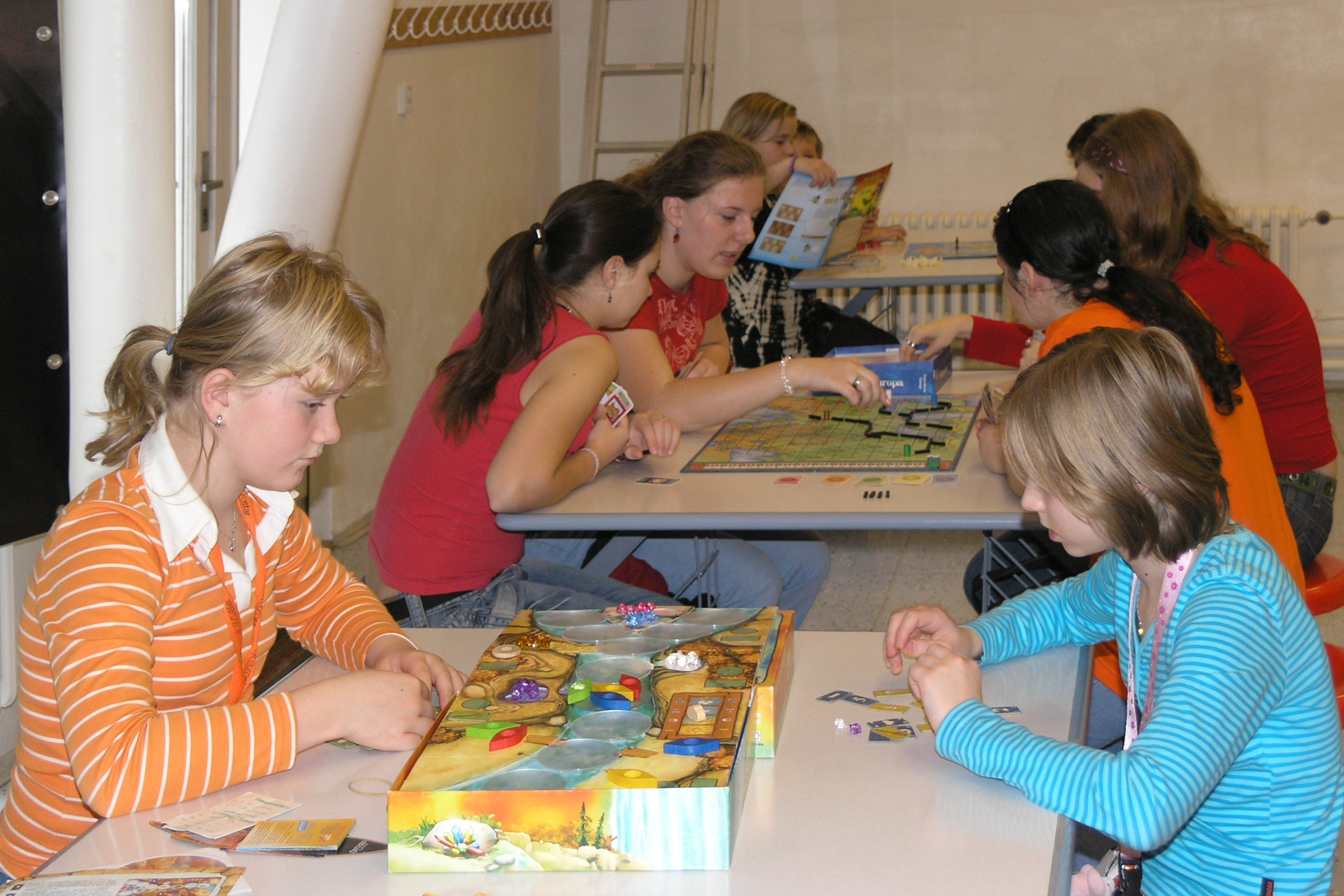
A game in progress

Players collect gems along a river. Players move canoes to transport the gems, and can steal gems from other players' canoes. They may also influence the speed with which the board spaces move downstream. The first player to acquire four gems of one colour, or one of each of the five colours, or seven gems of any colour, is the winner. Although the game box states that gems closer to the waterfall are of higher value, the game treats all colours equally.

== Expansions ==
=== Diamond Joe ===
Given away at the Spiel 2005 game festival, Diamond Joe adds another canoe which is controlled indirectly by the players, and which participates in trades, generally bringing the harder-to-reach gems upstream.

=== Spirits of Niagara ===
Released in 2006, Spirits of Niagara adds double-capacity canoes, pieces for a sixth player, additional paddle cards with new actions, and a whirlpool which pushes canoes downstream. It also adds two "spirits" of the river: the "Bathing Beaver", which resets the flow of the river to normal, and the "Hurried Elk", which allows a player to move their canoe faster if they reach the gems on the edge of the waterfall.

== Reception ==
=== Reviews ===
- Rebel Times #5

== Awards ==
In 2005 Niagara won the Spiel des Jahres and was one of the winners of the Mensa Mind Games competition. It received 2nd place in the Deutscher Spiele Preis and 3rd in the Schweizer Spielepreis for Family Games. The game was also reviewed in Pyramid.
