= Cartographers (board game) =

Roll and write board game

- Designers: Jordy Adan
- Illustrators: Lucas Ribeiro, Luis Francisco
- Publishers: Thunderworks Games
- Publication: 2019; 7 years ago
- Players: 1–100
- Playing time: 30–45 minutes
- Age range: 10+
- Website: www.thunderworksgames.com/cartographers.html

Cartographers is a roll and write board game designed by Jordy Adan and published in 2019 by Thunderworks Games. It is part of the Roll Player universe. In the game, players aim to draw terrains based on drawn cards that award points based on the relevant letter cards. The game received positive reviews, and was nominated for the Kennerspiel des Jahres, but lost to The Crew. It was also runner-up to Parks for the Best Family Game of the 2019 Board Game Quests Awards. An app for solitary play was released in 2020.

== Gameplay ==
The object of the game is to establish a seat of power for the monarch Queen Gimnax of the Kingdom of Nalos by reclaiming the northern lands taken by the Dragul. The selected location must satisfy several criteria, among them that the surrounding area provides natural defenses and resources. Players assume the role of a surveyor scout that travels into the Dragul lands to find a suitable location. Each player receives a pencil and the same double-sided map, agreeing before the start of the game which side to use. The number of players is limited only by the number of available score sheets; each box includes 100.

To set up, letter cards are arranged in order (from A to D), and scoring cards are sorted into piles according to the back of the card then shuffled. One card is selected from each pile and randomly arranged adjacent to one of the letter cards. The four Season cards are placed face-up in ascending order starting with Spring, and Ambush cards are shuffled and placed into a face-down draw pile, one of which is drawn to place with the Explore cards.

The game progresses over four seasons of multiple turns, and each turn is split into three phases. In the 'Explore' phase, the top card of the explore deck is turned over, revealing one or more shapes and terrain types. In the 'Draw' phase, players choose the revealed terrains or shapes and draw them in any orientation on their personal map. When the revealed card is an 'Ambush', maps are passed to another player, who draws the monster indicated on the card on one of the empty map slots before returning the map. Players who fail to surround these spaces with terrain by the end of the season will lose points.

During the final 'Check' phase, if it is the end of the season, players earn points based on the goals stated on the relevant letter cards and lose one point per empty space adjacent to a monster. The Explore deck is reshuffled to begin the next season.

The end of the fourth season marks the end of the game, the winner being the player who has accumulated the greatest number of points.

== Expansion ==
The expansion set Cartographers Heroes was developed via a crowdfunding campaign on Kickstarter. It adds new Scoring and Ambush cards, which may be mixed with the original game, as well as Explore cards. Only one set of Explore cards can be used in any game, either from the original set or from the expansion.

The Kickstarter campaign also made new map packs available.

== Reception ==
David McMillan, in his review for Meeple Mountain, states that the game is "easy to teach and play, and the gameplay is phenomenal". The game was also nominated for the 2020 Kennerspiel des Jahres, but lost to the trick-taking card game The Crew. The jury praised the tactics, clarity without "the burden of any heavy game mechanics", and replayability through "the variable combination of royal objectives". The digital version was also listed as one of the best 2020 board game applications by Ars Technica.
