= Michael Schacht =

German game designer and graphician

Michael Schacht (born 1964 in Wiesbaden) is a German game designer, graphician and owner of the small publishing company Spiele aus Timbuktu.

== Life and work ==
Schacht studied graphic design at the FH Darmstadt. About 15 years he worked as Art Director in different advertising agencies. 2005 he quit the branch and became one of the few full-time board game designer in Germany. He is married and lives presently (2010) in Frankfurt/Main.

Developing started for him with a boardgame designing contest. His first publication was in 1992 the game Taxi in the magazine Spielerei. His biggest success so far was in 2007 his game Zooloretto that received Spiel des Jahres (game of the year) in Germany.

== Games (selection) ==
- 1999: Kontor (Goldsieber)
- 1999: Tohuwabohu (Goldsieber, Familygame of the Year in Denmark 1999)
- 2000: Kardinal & König (a.k.a. Web of Power, Rio Grande Games, Goldsieber)
- 2001: Isis & Osiris (Goldsieber, Nominee Toy of the Year Netherlands 2001)
- 2002: Dschunke (Queen Games, 3rd place Deutscher Spiele Preis 2002)
- 2002: Potzblitz (a.k.a. Grab Bag, HABA)
- 2003: Coloretto (Rio Grande Games, Abacusspiele, Best Card Game in Germany 2003)
- 2003: Industria (Queen Games, Gamers Choice Awards: Multiplayer Nominees 2004)
- 2003: Magna Grecia (Rio Grande Games, Clementoni, Nominee International Gamers Award 2004)
- 2003: Paris Paris (Abacusspiele)
- 2003: Richelieu und die Königin! (Ravensburger)
- 2004: Hansa (Überplay, Abacusspiele)
- 2004: Socken zocken (a.k.a. Lucky Sock Dip, HABA, Spiel gut 2005)
- 2005: China (Überplay, Abacusspiele), Rerelease of Kardinal & König / Web of Power with new theme
- 2006: California (Überplay, Abacusspiele)
- 2007: Zooloretto (Rio Grande Games, Abacusspiele), Winner Game of the Year in Germany 2007)
- 2007: Patrizier (a.k.a. Patrician, Mayfair Games, Amigo, Spiel gut 2008)
- 2008: Aquaretto (Rio Grande Games, Abacusspiele)
- 2008: Shanghaien (Abacusspiele)
- 2009: Bürger, Baumeister & Co. (Abacusspiele, for the 150 years celebration of Saalbau Frankfurt)
- 2009: Valdora (Abacusspiele, 6th place Deutscher Spiele Preis 2009)
- 2009: Die Goldene Stadt (a.k.a. The Golden City, Kosmos, Z-Man Games)
- 2011: Mondo (Pegasus)
- 2012: Mondo Sapiens (Pegasus)
- 2017: Smile (Z-Man Games)
- 2019: Iwari (ThunderGryph Games)
