= The Mind (card game) =

Card game

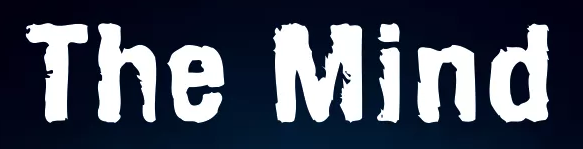
- Designers: Wolfgang Warsch
- Illustrators: Oliver Freudenreich
- Publishers: Nürnberger-Spielkarten-Verlag; Pandasaurus Games
- Publication: 2018; 8 years ago
- Genres: Card game
- Players: 2–4
- Playing time: 20 minutes
- Age range: 8+

The Mind is a card game designed by Wolfgang Warsch and published in 2018 by Nürnberger-Spielkarten-Verlag (NSV). Players attempt to play hands of numbered cards in correct ascending order without communicating.

== Publishing history ==
The Mind was first published in Germany in early 2018 by NSV, before its North American release in late 2018 published by Pandasaurus Games. In 2019, NSV published The Mind Extreme, an adaptation of the game played using one increasing and one decreasing deck, and Pandasaurus Games followed in early 2020. The Mind: Soulmates, another adaptation which has players play their cards face down with the help of a Seer, was published by NSV in 2023.

== Gameplay ==
The Mind is played over an amount of levels depending on the number of players (eight rounds in a four-player game, ten rounds in a three-player game, and twelve rounds in a two-player game) using a deck of cards labelled from 1 to 100. Every round, the deck is shuffled and each player is dealt an amount of cards equal to the level number, which they keep hidden from the other players. Once play begins, any player can play a card from their hand at any time face up into a central pile with the goal to collaboratively place down all cards in players' hands in ascending order without communicating. If a player places down a card and another player has a lower numbered card in their hand, players discard any cards from their hands that are lower than the played card and a life is lost, then play continues.

Players have throwing stars which they can use during a round if a silent vote to use one is unanimous, causing each player to simultaneously discard the lowest numbered card from their hand before play continues. The number of lives and throwing stars players begin the game with is determined by the amount of players, and certain levels will add more if completed. Players win if they complete all required levels, and lose if they run out of lives at any point.

== Reception ==
Polygon included The Mind in their list of the "best two-player board games". In a review for Tabletop Gaming Magazine, James Wallis described The Mind as "[2018's] most controversial game," in reference to a debate about whether its simple rules allow it to be considered a game, but praised it for its unique gameplay and "pure experience". Matt Jarvis, wrote for Dicebreaker that the game was "one of the most entertaining and unique board game experiences of recent years," but noted that "its unique nature means it won’t be for everyone." Charlie Theel, writing for Ars Technica, praised the game for its impassioning gameplay and use of limited communication, concluding that "The Mind is one of the most intensely clever exercises in simplicity I’ve seen. It brings a single mechanism to the table and offers a few restrictions that result in a fantastic trick."

The Mind was nominated for the Spiel des Jahres in 2018, and the Diana Jones Award in 2019. The game won both Jeu de l'Année (game of the year) in the As d'Or awards, and Best Family Game in the Årets Spil awards in 2019.
