= Giganten (board game) =

- Designers: Herbert Pinthus
- Publishers: Carlit
- Publication: 1981
- Players: 2
- Playing time: 30 minutes
- Skills: Strategy

Giganten, also named as "Dinosaures Giganti" is a 2-player board game designed by Herbert Pinthus and first published in 1981 by Carlit. Gameplay is inspired by another game, Stratego, and created in prehistoric setting. There were two editions.

- Small edition, added variable terrain (land, swamp, lakes). Lakes were not terrain but obstacles.
- Large edition: added variable board consisting of 4 parts and added 2 more dinosaurs.

The large won the Essen Feather-prize (prize for the best rules) in 1983.

== Gameplay ==
Each player has a set of 23 saurians (dinosaurs of various kinds, pterodactyls, plesiosaurs, etc) which are stand-up cardboard pieces with plain backs, so the opponent cannot tell which piece is which. Pieces move and attack each other Stratego-fashion, with the goal being to find your opponent's eggs. Pieces have numbers to indicate their strength.

== Awards ==
- 1983 Essen Feather
