= Entdecker =

Board game

Entdecker ([ɛntˈdɛkɐ], German for "Discoverer") is a German-style board game designed by Klaus Teuber and published in 1996 by Goldsieber in German. Although the game won 2nd prize in the Deutscher Spiele Preis in 1996, many gamers were disappointed with the game after the success of Teuber's previous game, The Settlers of Catan. An updated version, Die Neuen Entdecker, was published in 2001 by Kosmos; this version was published in English by Mayfair Games under the title Entdecker - Exploring New Horizons. This version of the game won the Essen Feather for that year.

== Gameplay ==
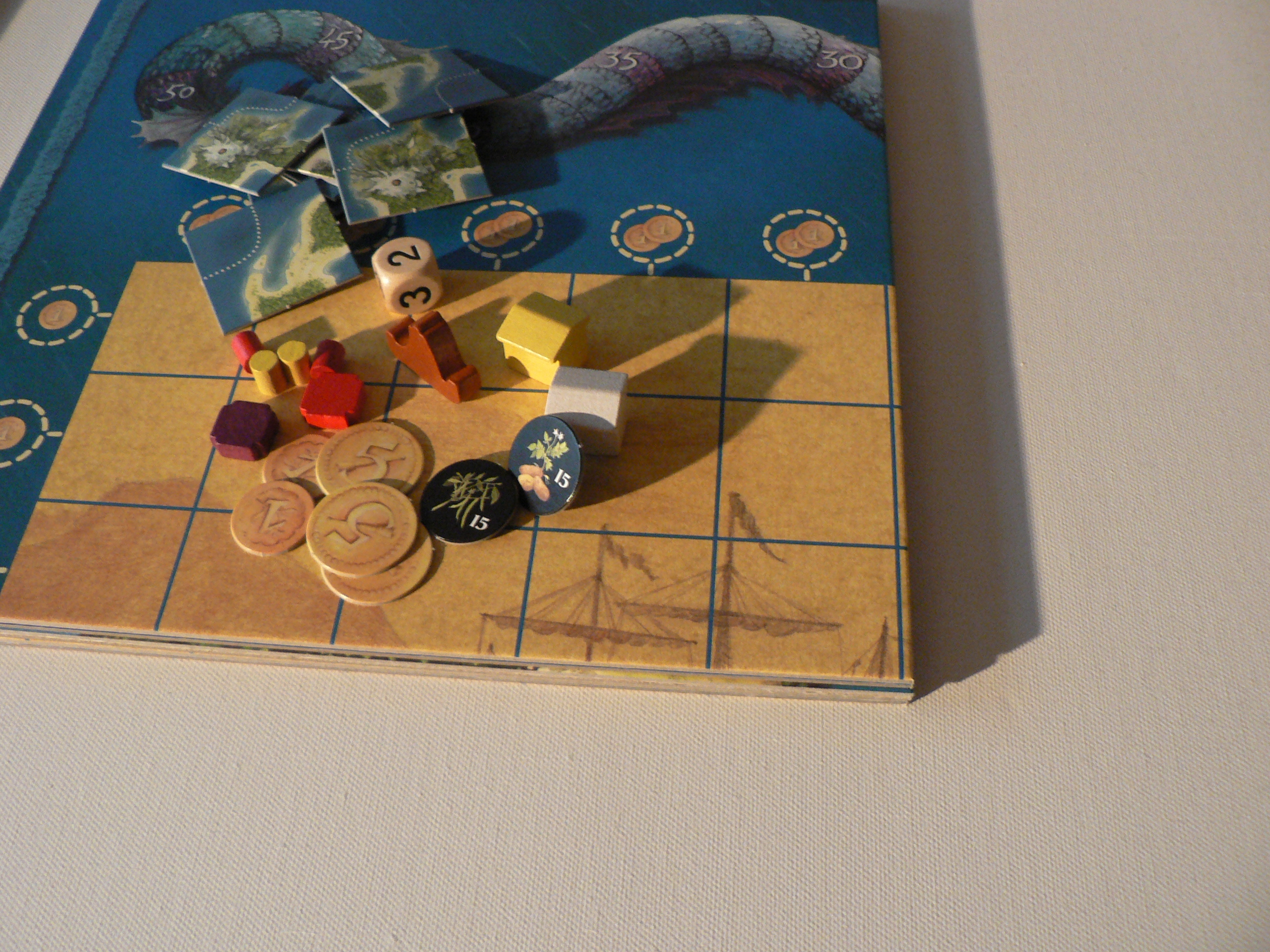
Folded game board with pieces

The game begins with an empty grid. As players move their ship counters to explore the grid, they place tiles which determine the shape of islands. When islands are completed, they have the chance to explore those islands.
