= Franz-Benno Delonge =

German board game designer

- Born: 1957
- Died: 2 September 2007 (aged 49–50)
- Known for: Game Designer

Franz-Benno Delonge (1957 – 2 September 2007) was a designer of German-style board games. He has been nominated for multiple best game awards, including Spiel des Jahres and International Gamers Awards. TransAmerica won the Mensa best mind game award for 2003. He died of cancer on 2 September 2007.

== Early life ==
Delonge started boardgaming as a child, often spending extended periods of time with his grandmother and her sisters. These three widows enjoyed all kinds of card and board games, and the most popular card game in Bavaria was for four players. Although quite hard, they made sure he could play by the time he was eight.

== Works ==
=== Big City ===
Big City (published 1999) is a game with a modular board, each board section representing a neighbourhood of a new and growing city. Players draw cards representing development lots on those neighbourhoods, and then turn the cards in to build residences, offices, and other special buildings. If a building is larger than a single space, then multiple cards must be turned in, representing the adjacent lots. Some buildings have restrictions on where they can be placed, and points are scored based on the size and type of building, with bonuses for location, and the adjacent buildings. Players also have an opportunity to build a streetcar line, which also provides bonus points for buildings.

=== TransAmerica ===
TransAmerica (published 2001), was Delonge's greatest success, and also won a Mensa Best Mind Game award. Players have to build track to connect their five randomly and secretly assigned cities. Delonge attributed much of its success to the simplicity of the rules.

=== Fjords ===
Fjords (2005)

=== TransEuropa ===
TransEuropa (2005)

=== Other games ===
- Hellas (2002)
- Zahltag (2002)
- Goldbräu (2004)
- Dos Rios (2004)
- Nah Dran! (2004)
- Manila (2005)
- Kunstmarkt (2006)
- Zanzibar (2007)
- Container (2007)
