= Ubongo =

Board game

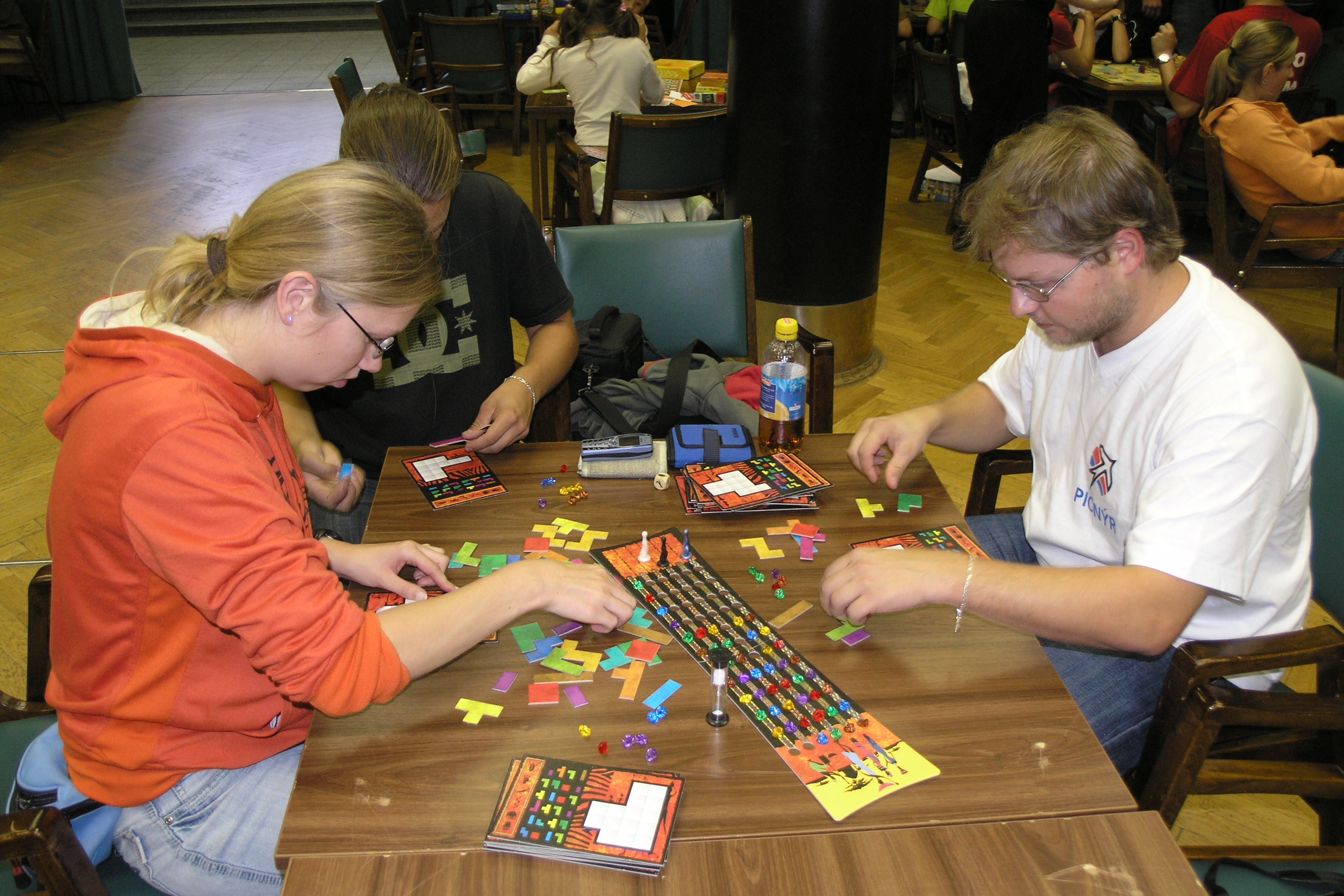
Ubongo

Ubongo is a board game developed by Polish-born Swedish game designer Grzegorz Rejchtman. It originally appeared as Pyramidens Portar by the Swedish publisher Kärnan and won the Swedish Årets spel prize in 2003. The game was later released in Germany in 2005 as Ubongo by the publisher Kosmos and got 4th place at the German board game competition and was among the finalists in the International Gamers Award.

The game is for 2 to 4 players of ages 8 and above, and takes about 20 to 30 minutes. Ubongo is an abstract puzzle game, based on a pentamino variant, reminiscent of a combination of Tangram and Tetris. The game includes a simplified version with fewer pieces, for children and beginners.

Ubongo is well suited for a game for the whole family, because its mechanics entertain both children and adults. Solving puzzles is entertaining by itself and provides excitement when combined with competition with other players.

The word "ubongo" means "brain" in Swahili, a language spoken in Eastern and Central Africa.

== Theme ==
The cardboard player boards and the main board with the jewels are coloured in strong earthy colours, on a black and red background, with the simple, clear motives themed after African or Australian Aboriginal culture, featuring animals found in the jungle and on the savanna. Jewels made of translucent, colourful plastic are used as prizes.

An example of a player board

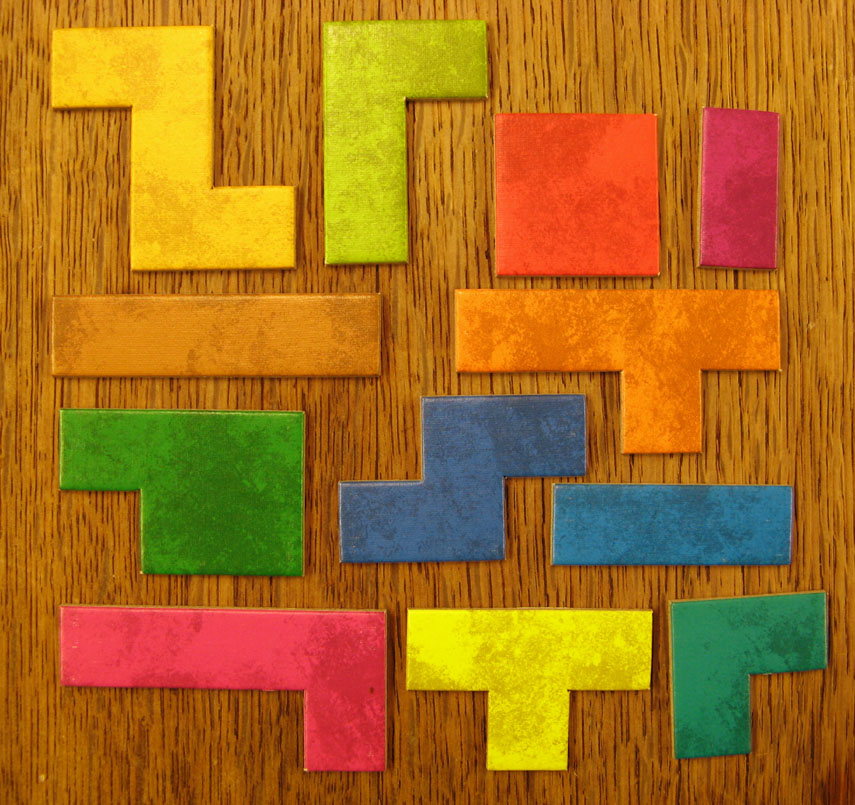
Playing pieces

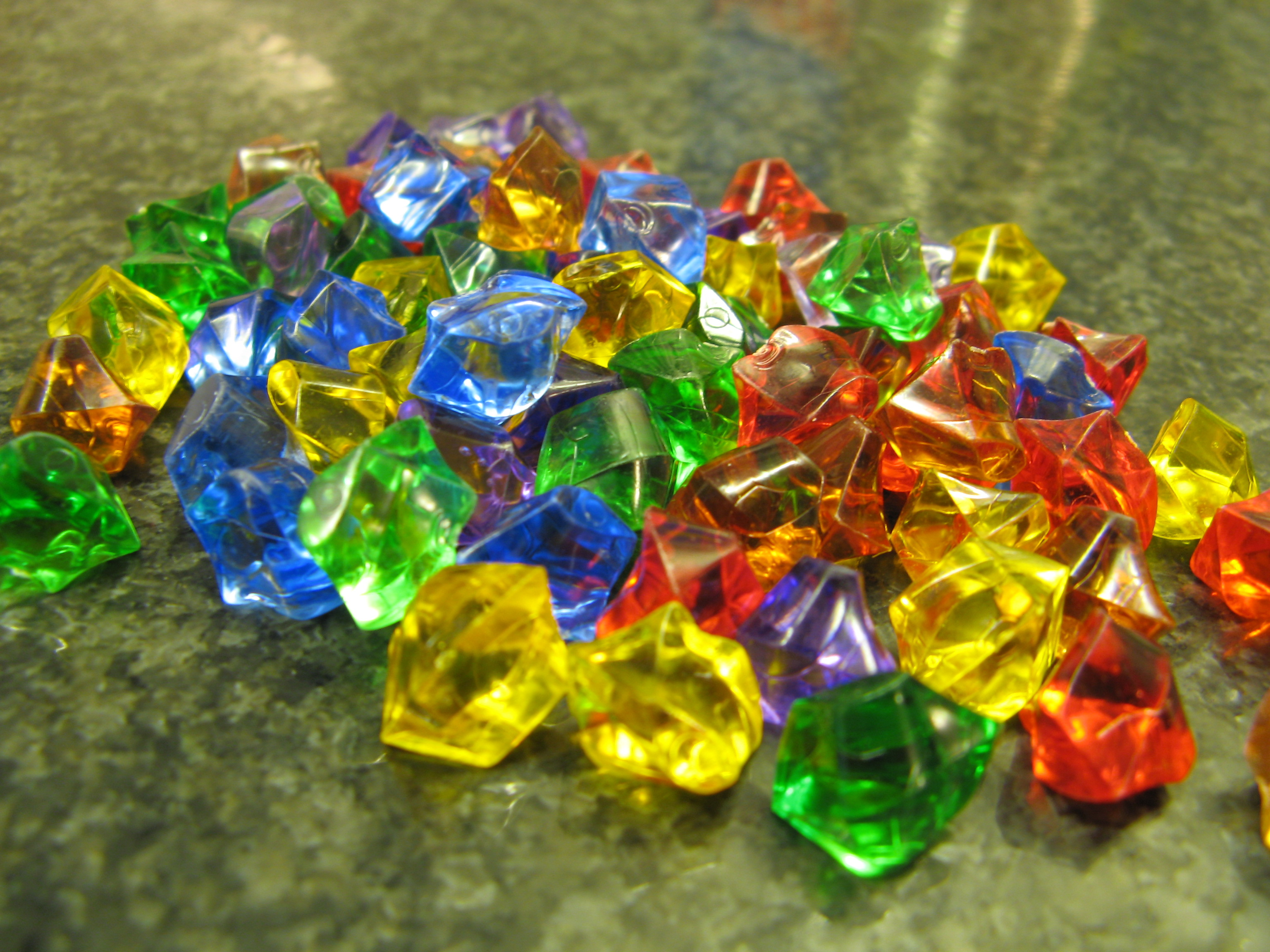
Jewels

== Rules ==
The game includes 36 cardboard pieces, of which four have to be used to completely cover the shape on the player board. On the other side of the player board is a simpler version, which has only to be covered with three pieces. Each player receives a player board, and a throw of a die decides which four pieces have to be used to cover the shape. The player must then use the pieces to completely cover up the shape without overlapping the pieces. An hourglass is used to limit the time to cover the shape.

Each player to manage to cover up the shape in time receives the right to take jewels from the main board. Where the player can take jewels from depends on his/her rank among the players to complete their shape. Then the player cards are redistributed for the next turn.

At the end of the game, the player who has the most jewels of a specific single colour wins the game.
