= Keyflower (board game) =

Keyflower is a Euro-style board game designed by Sebastian Bleasdale and Richard Breese, and originally published by R&D games in 2012. It can be played by 2-6 players. In this game, players use their workers to try to build the best village among the players, by earning the most victory points in 4 rounds. The game features strategic use of workers, where players use them both for bidding for new village tiles and to use them. It has received numerous honors, and is ranked as the 50th best game in BoardGameGeek as of 2019.

== Gameplay ==
Each player receives a starting home tile, 8 random workers behind a screen, and some winter tiles at the beginning. Workers come in 4 colors: red, yellow, blue and green, where first 3 colors are mixed in a bag and green workers can only be acquired otherwise.

The game is played over four rounds, and each round depicts a season. In spring, summer and fall, new tiles will be available in the market. On player's turns, they can bid for a tile in the market, use a tile for its effects, or pass. When bidding, players can use workers of a matching color to place them on their side of a tile to show the bid. Some general rules for bidding:

1. Players can only use a specific color if that color of worker is present on or around a tile.
2. Any bid have to beat a previous bid.
3. Players may not move their current winning bid, but may add more workers to a winning bid.
4. Players may use their workers in a losing bid to do other things when they stay together.

Alternatively, players can place their workers on a tile to use the tile. The workers can produce resources, other workers, skills, and transport & upgrade. Resources produced are put on the tile itself if the player own that tile, otherwise the resources are put on the player's home tile. Players typically use one worker on a tile to use it the first time, and if they want to use it again, they have to put at least one more worker than the previous use of matching color, and no more than 6 workers can be present on a tile. Players may use any tile visible in the game, including their own village, other player's villages, or in the market. However, some tiles may not be used, instead they give some passive effects or victory points.

There are also boat tiles equal to the number of players, containing more workers and skills to help the players each season, and they are not available for bid. Instead they will be acquired through bidding of turn order tiles.

A round ends when every player passes in a row, meaning that players can pass and come back later. After the end of a round, players take back their losing bids, and the tiles they won along with all workers on the tiles and in their village. When placing new tiles in the village, all sides have to match. All workers used for winning bids are discarded, as well as any tiles without any bid. Then the player winning the highest turn order tile chooses a boat first, and then the winner of next highest turn order tile among the remaining players chooses second, and so on. If any players did not take a boat after resolving turn order tiles, the order would be clockwise starting from the first player, until everyone have a boat. Then new tiles come to the market, boats and player order tiles are reset, and a new season begins.

Winter is different. Instead of having new tiles for the market, each player will pick at least 1 winter tile from their hands, and put them in the market for bidding. Winter tiles are all scoring tiles. Also, no more workers and skills will come to the boats, instead they give victory points, and players can add boats and player order tiles to their villages.

The game ends after all 4 seasons. Players will have a final chance to allocate resources to score for the winter tiles, where everything they have can only be scored once, and some tiles do not allow reallocation. Then the player(s) with the most victory points win.

== Awards and honors ==
- 2014 Gouden Ludo Nominee
- 2013 UK Games Expo Best Boardgame Nominee
- 2013 Tric Trac Finalist
- 2013 Tric Trac de Bronze Winner
- 2013 International Gamers Award - General Strategy: Multi-player Nominee
- 2013 Golden Geek Most Innovative Board Game Nominee
- 2012 Meeples' Choice Winner
- 2012 Meeples' Choice Nominee
- 2012 Jogo do Ano Winner
- 2012 Jogo do Ano Nominee

== Expansions ==
=== Keyflower: The Farmers (2013) ===
This expansion adds tiles that generates wheat and farm animals, where they can be kept in fields separated by roads. It also adds some new ways to score points based on wheat, animals and village layout.

=== Keyflower: The Merchants (2014) ===
This expansion adds contracts, extensions, and cabins along with some new tiles. Contracts can be traded for one on the resource shown, and scores points if players allocate resources to complete the contract. Extensions allow a tile to be upgraded a second time. When players take the upgrade action, they can choose an available extension and pay the cost to place it on an upgraded tile, where the tile is worth double the fix point value but also restrict the use of worker by that color. Cabins can be added to home tiles, and it gives one extra upgrade action when players use the home tile.

=== Promo tiles ===
- Boat 7 (2018)—Summer boat. One side: can place resources or animals anywhere in your village. Other side: receive one wood, stone and iron after summer, fall and winter.
- Delivery Man (2018)—Winter tile. Starting from the tile, get 1 point for each tile traveled by road.
- Developer (2018)—Summer tile. Score 2 points for each upgrade symbol adjacent to the tile at the end of the game, and can be upgraded by a wood to get 3 points for each.
- Sorcerer (2018)—Summer tile. Take an action on an adjacent tile, and can be upgraded by 2 skills to take an action on any tile in the village, plus 5 points.
- Keymelequin (2018)—Ship tile that feature two-colored worker, they can be used as either color.
- Pig Shelter (2015)—Fall tile. Score 2 points per pig allocated at the end of the game, and can be upgraded by a skill to get 3 points for each.
- Beekeeper (2014)—Winter tile. Score 2 points per adjacent tile.
- Trader (2014)—Summer tile. Trade a skill for a green worker, can be upgraded to trade a skill for 2 green workers.
- Enporium & Monument (2013)—Winter tiles. Enporium: Score 3 points for each set of green worker and 2 other workers allocated. Monuments: Score 4 points for each set of 1 gold and 2 resources allocated.
- Storyteller (2013)—Spring tile. Get either a worker or a skill, and can be upgraded for a stone and iron to get both.

== Related games ==
Keyflower is the 7th game in the Key series published by R&D games. The games listed are other games from the Key series.

- Key Flow (2018)
- Keyper (2017)
- Key to the City: London (2016)
- Key Market (2010)
- Key Harvest (2007)
- Keythedral (2002)
- Keytown (2000)
- Keydom (1998)
- Keywood (1995)
