= Die Macher =

Board Game

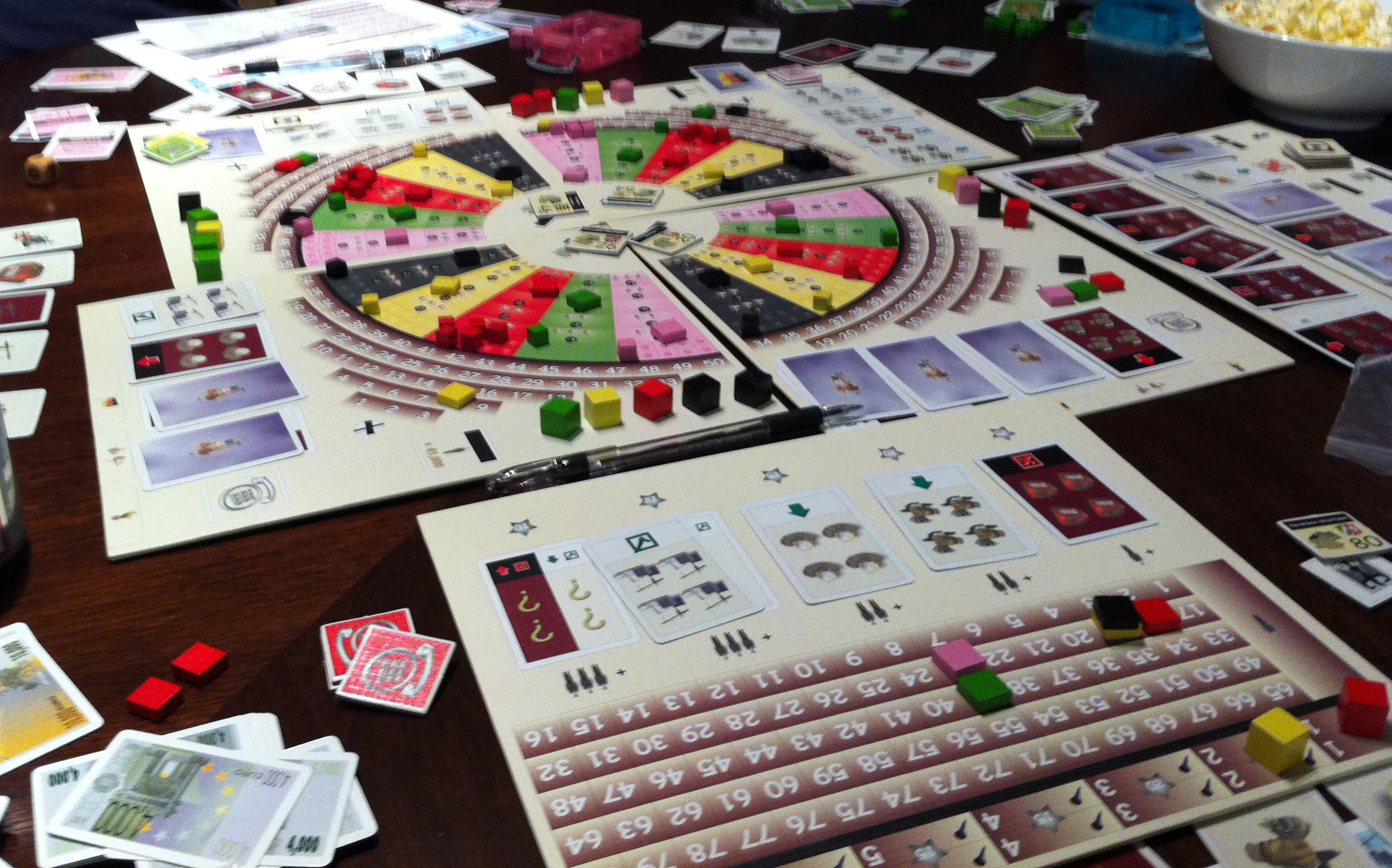
- A Game of Die Macher in progress
- Designers: Karl-Heinz Schmiel
- Illustrators: Marcus Gschwendtner
- Publishers: Hans im Glück, Moskito, Valley Games, Inc.
- Publication: 1986
- Genres: economic, political
- Systems: auction, bidding
- Players: 3-5
- Playing time: 240 minutes / 4 hours
- Chance: Low
- Age range: 14+

Die Macher is a strategy board game published by Hans im Glück in 1986 that simulates a German general election.

== Publication history ==
Die Macher ("The Makers") was designed by Karl-Heinz Schmiel of Germany, and published by Hans im Glück in 1986 as a four-player game. The original edition used only the Länder (German states) of the former West Germany, and featured political issues relevant to the mid-1980s.

A revised version of the game with more professional production values was released in 1998. It added the Länder of eastern Germany, a fifth party (the PDS, the successor of the East German SED), updated the issues to those of the 1990s, and extensively changed the rules. It was nominated for the 1998 Spiel des Jahres (Game of the Year) award.

In 2006, Valley Games of Canada produced a new version of the game, with language-independent components, revised issues, the PDS renamed to Die Linke, and a few minor rules changes.

== Description ==
The game is based on the German electoral system. Each player takes the role of one of the major German political parties. In the 1986 edition, these were the CDU/CSU, FDP, SPD, and the Greens. In the 1998 version, a fifth party, the PDS, was added. In the 2006 edition the PDS was renamed Die Linke.

=== Components ===
- Bonn board
- 4 region boards
- 11 region cards
- 7x4 cabinet cards
- 24 opinion poll cards
- 2 donation cards
- 42 party program cards
- 48 opinion cards
- 4 sets of 49 wooden playing pieces
- 2 sequence of play sheets
- 2 cabinet member explanation cards
- 2 score pads
- play currency
- 3 special dice
- debate marker
- rulebook

=== Gameplay ===
Parties score points based on seats won in seven state (Land) elections, the size of their national party base, the amount to which they control the national media, and how well their party platform aligns with national opinion.

Each state election is a "mini game" on its own. Each state has its own interests (such as "do we support higher taxes, or not?"), and a party will do better if its platform aligns with the local concerns. Players can deploy a limited number of "party meetings" (groups of grassroots activists) to a state; the more they have there, the more votes they will generate when the election is resolved. "Shadow Cabinet" cards, representing influential party officials, can be used to perform some special actions, and each party tracks its "trend" (favorability rating) in the state using a sliding scale. When the election is held, each party scores votes based on the formula (trend + interest alignment)* (number of meetings). A maximum score is 50, and parliamentary seats (victory points) are awarded based on this score and the state's actual number of seats in parliament. The seven states are chosen at random from the sixteen Länder of Germany, so some elections will be more influential than others. Players can modify their party's' platform and by controlling the local media can also affect what the state is concerned about.

Winning the local election allows the party to advance their media control to the national level and to help outline the national issues list. Players see the elections developing in advance and can apply their resources to the current election or upcoming ones, adding to the difficult decision making. During each state election, parties can agree to, or be forced into, coalitions, and share in any victory. Parties must also decide whether or not they will accept contributions from special interests with the possibility of alienating their grassroots donor base.

=== Victory conditions ===
Victory points are gained in four ways:

1. . Winning a regional election results in 1–80 victory points
2. . If a winning party has some media influence in that region, the player will receive some media-control victory points.
3. . Victory points are also rewarded based on national membership
4. . Victory points are awarded if the player's party platform matches national opinion at the end of the game.

The player who amasses the most victory points wins the game.

== Reception ==
In the March 1989 edition of Games International (Issue #3), Alan R. Moon admitted that Die Macher was "a complicated game" and that "it is a tough game to teach." He also noted that "The game doesn't let you get away with a blunder either." Despite this, Moon found the game highly attractive and recommended it, saying, "Die Macher takes more than a minute to learn and you'll probably never master it. [...] This game makes you play yourself as well as the opponent."

In the May 1989 edition of Games International (Issue #5), Brian Walker called it "arguably one of the most sophisticated [games], in terms of game mechanics, on the market."

== Awards ==
- Die Macher was nominated for the Spiel des Jahres (Germany) in 1998, and received a "Recommended" citation
- Die Macher won the 1998 Essen Feather Award for "Exemplary Rules"
- At the 2008 JoTa Awards (Brazil), Die Macher won the award for "Best Monster Board Game"
