= Nautilus (board game) =

Nautilus is a 2002 board game published by Mayfair Games.

== Gameplay ==
Nautilus is a game in which players compete to build underwater research stations, deploy scientists, and launch submarines to recover treasures and discover Atlantis, scoring points through exploration, special goals, and resource management until the game ends when Atlantis is found or expansion ceases.

== Reviews ==
- Pyramid
- Syfy
