= Villa Paletti =

Board game of physical skill

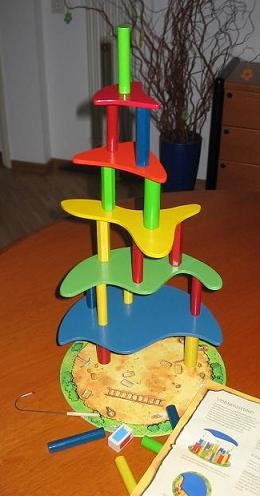
- Designers: Bill Payne
- Publishers: Zoch Verlag
- Players: 2–4
- Setup time: 5 minutes
- Playing time: 30 min
- Chance: None
- Age range: 8 and up
- Skills: Manual dexterity

Villa Paletti is a board game of physical skill designed by Bill Payne and published in 2001 by Zoch Verlag. Players compete to build the villa highest using columns from lower floors without collapsing the structure.

A double-size version of the game, Palazzo Paletti, is also available.

== Gameplay ==
Each player chooses a colour (in the case of two-player games, each player chooses two colours). They then take their wooden column pieces - three thin, one medium, and one wide - and arrange them on the base mat. The players must then agree on a fair placement of the first "floor", which must lie completely above the base mat and which cannot partially cover any column.

Each player in turn must take one of their columns from any level except the highest, and place it on the highest floor. If they cannot remove one of their columns, they may ask to place the next floor. Each opponent may challenge this decision; if they choose to do so and are successful, they may remove that piece from play, and the player misses their go. If no opponent challenges the player, they may place the next floor on top of the pillars of the current highest floor - again, it must lie completely above the base mat and cannot partially cover any column.

Once a column is placed on the second floor, the player with the most column points (one for thin, two for medium, three for large) on the highest level is the leader. If the tower is collapsed by any other player, the leader has won; if they collapse the tower, the previous leader wins. If the tower collapses before a column is placed on the second floor, or if the first leader collapses the tower, no-one has won.

== Awards ==
Villa Paletti won the Spiel des Jahres 2002, the Games 100 Top dexterity award, the Tric Trac gold medal 2001, Belgian game of the year 2003, finalist in Switzerland, Japan, Finland and more. The San Francisco Chronicle picked it as their top game for 2004.
