= Manila (board game) =

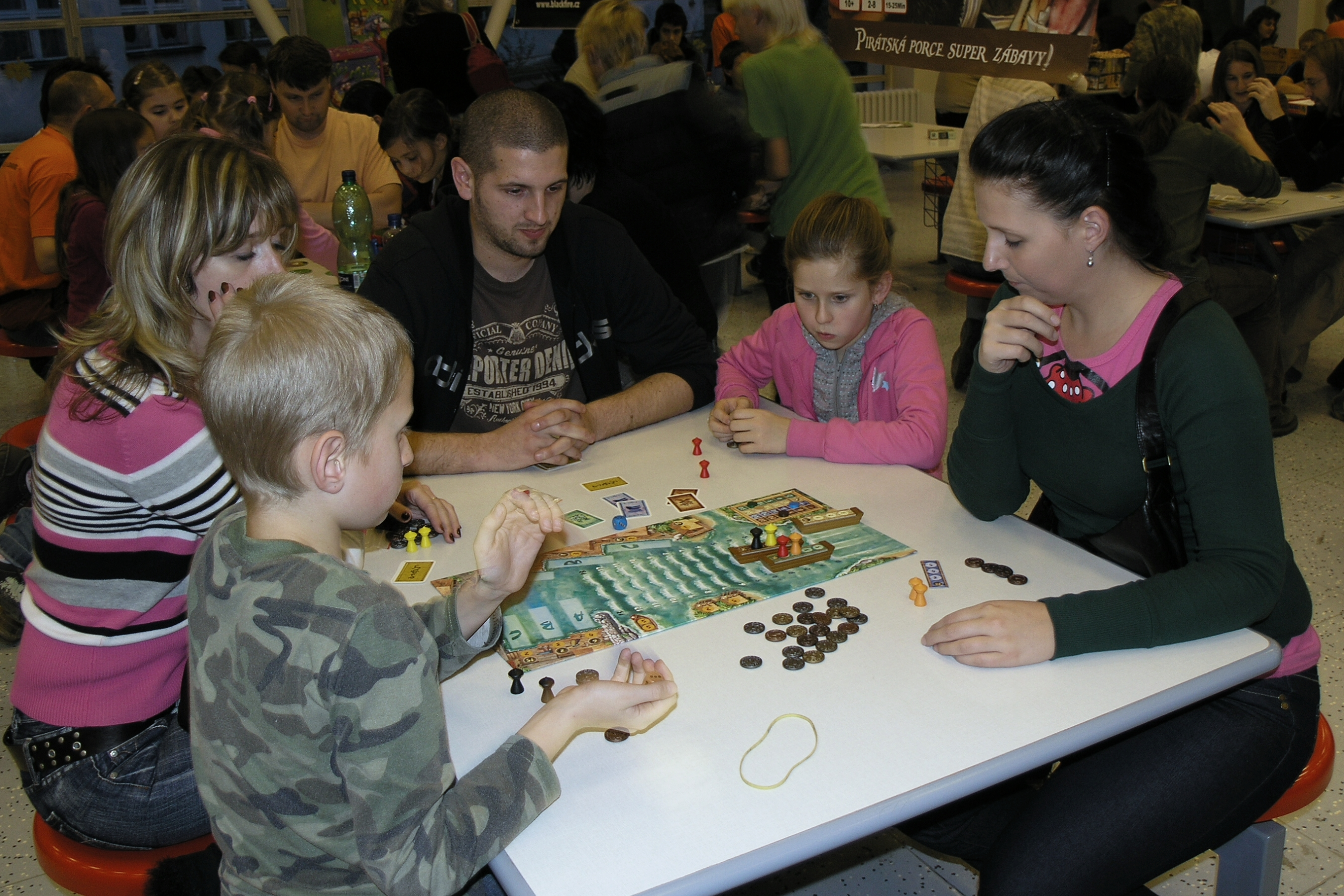
- Designers: Franz-Benno Delonge
- Illustrators: Victor Boden
- Publishers: Zoch Verlag; Rio Grande Games
- Genres: Nautical, Pirates, Transportation
- Players: 3 to 5
- Playing time: 60 minutes
- Chance: Medium
- Age range: 10 years and up

Manila is a German-style board game designed by Franz-Benno Delonge and published in 2005 by Zoch Verlag and Rio Grande Games. It involves auctioning/bidding, betting/wagering, commodity speculation, dice rolling, and worker placement. It is set in colonial Manila.

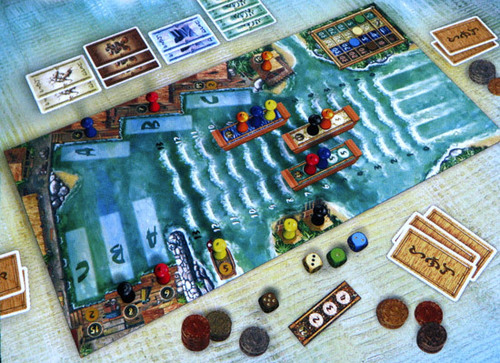
Manila

== Honors ==
- 2005 Deutscher Spiele Preis Best Family/Adult Game 3rd Place
- 2005 Japan Boardgame Prize Best Advanced Game Nominee
- 2005 Tric Trac Nominee
- 2006 As d'Or - Jeu de l'Année Nominee
- 2006 Golden Geek Best Family Board Game Nominee
- 2006 Nederlandse Spellenprijs Nominee
- 2007 Årets Spill Best Family Game Nominee

== Contents ==
- 1 game board
- 4 ware loads
- 4 dice
- 4 value indicators
- 20 cards
- 3 boats
- 20 accomplices
- 48 Philippines Coins
- 79 Coin Token (1Peso 21, 2Peso 18, 5Peso 16, 10Peso 15, 20Peso 9)
- Rule booklet
