= Parks (board game) =

Board game based on the national parks of the United States

- Designers: Henry Audubon
- Publishers: Keymaster Games
- Publication: 2019; 7 years ago
- Players: 1-5
- Playing time: 40-60 minutes
- Age range: 9+

Parks is a board game with a theme based on the national parks of the United States, published by Keymaster Games. The game's art was derived from the Fifty-Nine Parks Print Series.

== Gameplay ==
The game focuses on resource management as its principal mechanic. It progresses over the course of one year spanning four rounds representing the seasons. A trail is created by dealing 8 tiles from the set of 12. Each player begins with two hikers and an empty canteen at the start of the trail.

Each turn, a player moves one of their hikers to an empty space along the trail. On each space, they may acquire one of the resources or perform an action such as obtaining canteens, taking photographs, and encountering wildlife. A player may also use a campfire token to stop on an occupied trail space. Upon reaching the end of the trail, the player may exchange the acquired resources to visit as many parks as they can, and to acquire gear for the subsequent season of the game. Each subsequent season, all trail tiles are mixed, from which are selected one more than the previous season to create that season's trail.

A player wins the game by accumulating the most victory points. These are obtained by visiting the parks, by performing some of the actions (such as taking a photograph), by fulfilling the requirements of a 'secret year card' unique to each player, or by having control of the first turn marker at the end of the game.

== Expansion ==
In 2021, the modular expansion set Nightfall was published.

== Reception ==
In a summary review for Ars Technica, Aaron Zimmerman stated that he recommended the game "based solely on the strength of its stunning presentation", but that the "game is also great". In a review for Board Game Quest, Tom Mastrangeli describes it as having "stellar artwork, which is nothing short of phenomenal". In the Best Artwork Nominees description for the 2019 Diamond Climber Board Game Awards, Rachel LeCompte stated that "every inch of this game is covered in gorgeous illustrations". In his review for Meeple Mountain, Ian Howard states that "everything about Parks is beautiful", including the box cover art, the rulebook, the tokens and other game pieces, and "above all the Parks cards".

Parks won "Best Game from a Small Publisher" and "Best Family Game" in Board Game Quest's 2019 Board Game Awards.

Several reviewers liken it to the game Tokaido. Mastrangeli states that the game is "smooth and engaging", but that it can "become almost frustrating" with five players.
