= TransAmerica (board game) =

Board game

- TransAmerica game board
- Designers: Franz-Benno Delonge
- Illustrators: Marcel-André Casasola Merkle
- Publishers: Rio Grande Games
- Players: 2–6
- Setup time: 2 minutes
- Playing time: 30 minutes
- Chance: Low
- Age range: 8 and up
- Skills: Resource management

TransAmerica is a railroad board game centered on the construction of railroad track in the United States. The game was created by Franz-Benno Delonge and developed by Team Annaberg. It is published in the United States by Rio Grande Games. In 2003 it was a Mensa Select recipient, and was nominated for the 2002 Spiel des Jahres award.

== Gameplay ==
=== Setup ===
The cities on the board are divided into five different regions with seven cities per region. These regions are denoted by circles of different colors. If there are two or three players, the ten cards with dashed circles are removed from play. These cities are the two most difficult to build to in each region.

Each player selects one set of markers of the same color; a train for scorekeeping and a cylinder to mark the starting location. The train markers are placed on the thirteen on the score track. The "starting player" is then determined randomly.

=== Winning ===
The game is played until one or more players reach zero points when the player with the most points remaining wins. If after the second round, the player with the fewest points has at least four points, the number of points needed to end the game is moved to three points below the player with the fewest points remaining.

=== Rounds of play ===
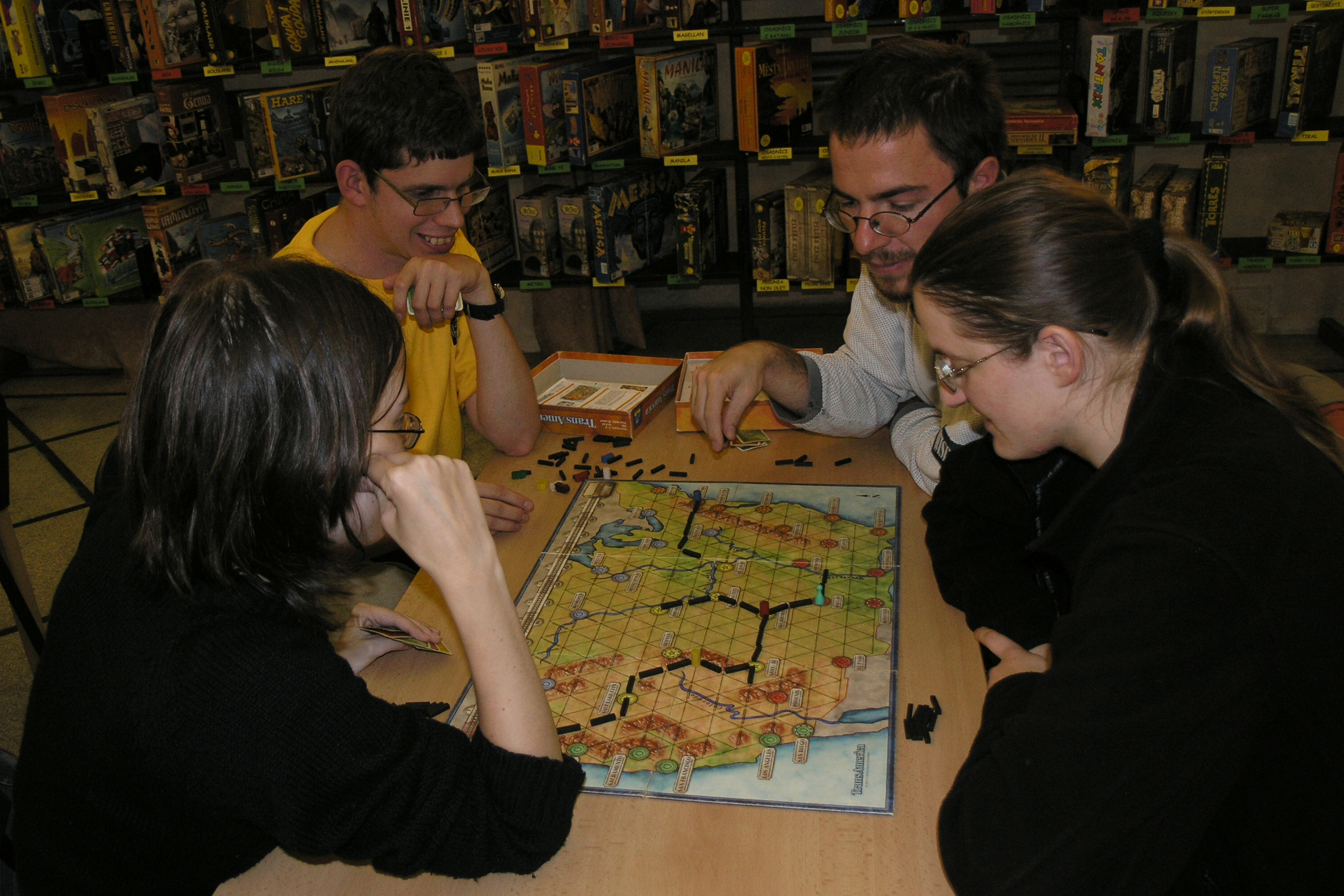
TransAmerica players

In each round, the players are dealt a card (indicating a city) from each region. Each player, beginning with the "starting player" and proceeding clockwise, then places their starting marker on the track junction of his choice. This may be on a city. The game proceeds with each player, again in the same order, placing two points' worth of track per turn. Crossing a river or mountain costs two points to build a track, and plains cost one point; unused building points may not be saved. The players may build from any track that can be traced back to his starting marker, including track that was built by other players.

Play continues until one player has all of his cities connected to his starting marker or all 84 of the track markers have been used. Players then count how many points it would have taken to build to his remaining cities and subtracts that many points from his points remaining, moving his marker on the scoring track accordingly.

If the game is not over, then the "starting player" card is passed one player to clockwise, and all track and starting markers are removed in preparation for another round.

An optional variation allows each player to place up to three segments of exclusive track (distinguished by color), not available for use by the other players.

== TransEuropa ==
TransEuropa is a game almost identical to TransAmerica, except set in Europe. The graphical design has slight differences, with the cards featuring landmarks, not the location in relation to the board. Although the rules are exactly the same, some argue that TransEuropa is harder than TransAmerica because there is more rough terrain, and more tricky city placement.

== Reception ==
A Lautapeliopas review praised its accessibility, but described luck as a significant factor of the game. The game also won a Mensa Select award.TransAmerica was also nominated for the 2002 Spiel des Jahres, with the jury praising its simplicity, engagement, tactics, and "attractive design". It was also reviewed in Pyramid.

== Reviews ==
- Family Games: The 100 Best
