= Coloretto =

Card game

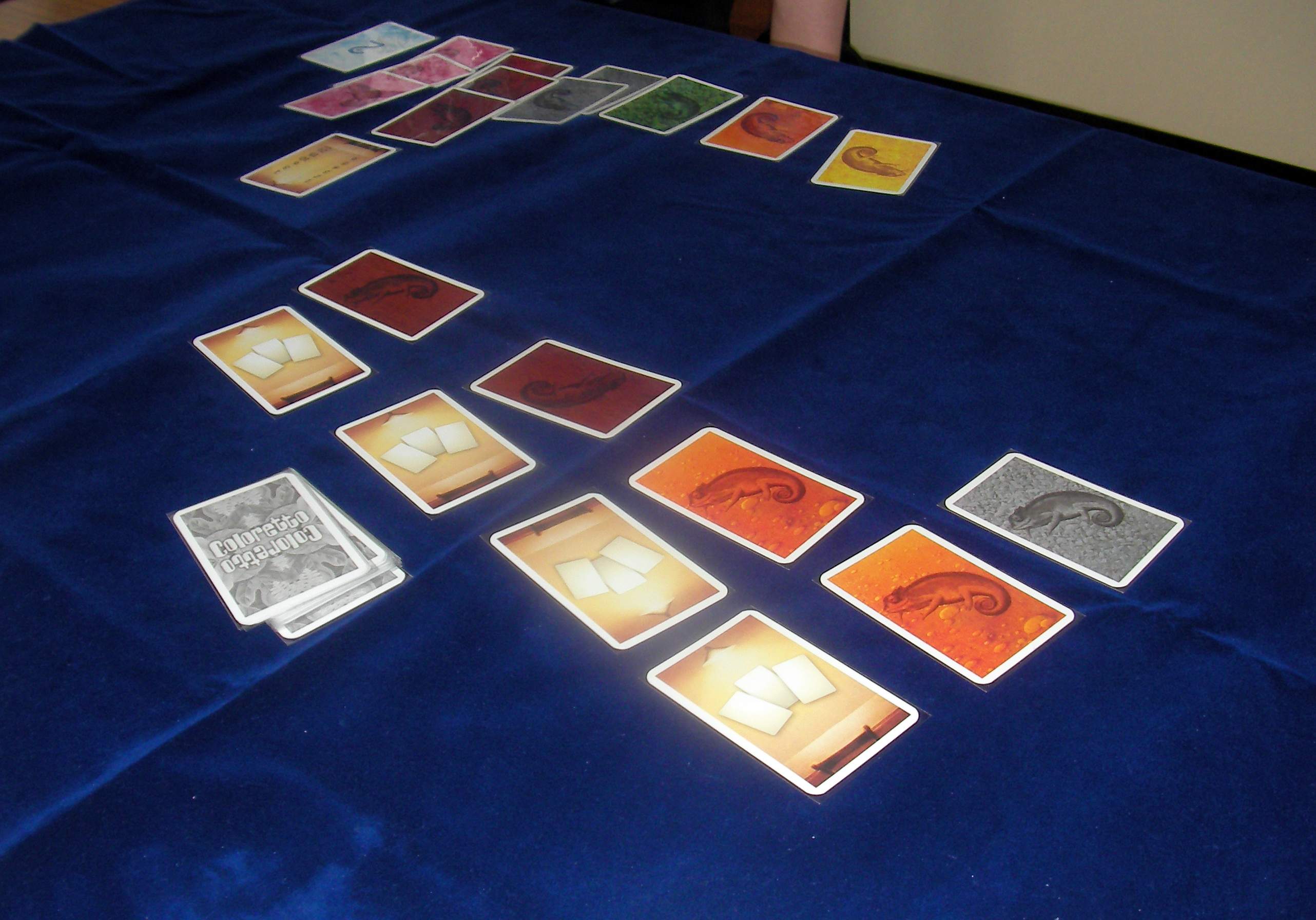
- A game of Coloretto in progress, with four rows of cards, and a player's collected cards visible behind
- Publishers: Rio Grande Games; Abacus; 999 Games
- Players: 2–5
- Setup time: 1 minute
- Playing time: 15–30 minutes
- Chance: Medium
- Age range: 8+
- Skills: Set collection

Coloretto is a card game designed by Michael Schacht, originally published in 2003. The game cards depict chameleons, showing that "a player may change his color many times during the game". Rules are provided in both English and French. The published game is designed for 3–5 players, but rules for a two-player version of the game are available at the Rio Grande Games website.

== Objective ==
Players collect cards in order to score points. There are seven colors of cards in Coloretto, together with three wild cards, or jokers, that can be matched with any color of a player's choice. The important factor in Coloretto is that only three colors contribute positively towards a player's score, while any remaining colors count against their score. The three colors are chosen individually by each player (e.g. player 1 can score positively for green, yellow, and blue cards, while player two scores positively for brown, green, and pink). There are also a number of "+2" cards which score two points independently of the colored cards.

== Gameplay ==
If playing with three players, one color of cards is removed from the deck before play begins. Each player then receives a card of a color, with no two players receiving the same color. The remaining cards are shuffled together, and a "last round" card is then placed fifteen cards from the bottom of the shuffled stack. The game plays out on a number of (initially empty) card rows equal to the number of players in the game. Coloretto provides "row markers" to easily track the rows, and to remind players when rows have been taken.

A player's turn consists of performing one of the following actions:

- Drawing a card and place it onto one of the (remaining) rows, unless this would be the fourth card in that row.
- Take a (non-empty) row of cards (and the "row marker" to indicate this action).

Once a player takes a row of cards, he or she is finished for that round and places the cards taken into his or her play area so that all other players can see them (adding them to other cards already in possession). The remaining players continue drawing and placing cards, subject to the "three-card" limit above, or taking rows themselves, until every player has taken a row of cards in that round. The player who took the last row begins the following round, with empty rows again at the start of the new round.

When the "last round" card has been drawn, play continues to the conclusion of that round, after which scoring is performed to determine a winner.

== Scoring ==
As stated above, at the end of the game each player decides which three colors will score positively for him or her, with the other colors scoring negative points, and matches any wild cards in their possession to colored cards as desired.

There are two scoring schemes distributed with the game. The beginner scoring scheme calculates points (positive or negative) for any single color based on the triangular numbers, namely one card is worth one point, two cards are worth three points, three cards are worth six points, etc, up to six (or more) cards being worth 21 points. The more difficult scoring scheme gives a player one point for one card of a color, four points for two cards, eight points for three cards, seven points for four cards, six points for five cards, and five points for six or more cards of the same color. This arrangement can lead to usually desirable wild cards being a liability for players.

In both scoring schemes, each "+2" card is worth two points.

The player with the highest total after the final round wins the game.

== Variant play ==
One (unofficial) variation on play concerns the wild cards. The game rules state that players need not match the wild cards with colors until the end of the game. One variation is that a player is required to decide the color of a wild card on the round that he or she takes it. This means that "the card is still powerful, but not always an immediate grab".
