= Clank!: A Deck-Building Adventure =

Clank!: A Deck-Building Adventure is a 2016 board game published by Dire Wolf Digital, Renegade Game Studios and others.

== Gameplay ==
Clank!: A Deck-Building Adventure is a game in which players sneak into a dragon's lair, build evolving decks, and race to steal an artifact and escape alive while managing noise, danger, and loot to become the greatest thief in the realm.

== Reviews ==
- Black Gate
- Rebel Times #121
