= Tom Lehmann (game designer) =

American game designer

Tom Lehmann (born July 1, 1958) has worked as an economist, programmer, boardgame publisher, and technical writer, but is best known as a game designer. His card game Race for the Galaxy won several awards.

== Career ==
Tom Lehmann was the publisher and designer of Prism Games. His first published game was in 1992. His works include Fast Food Franchise, Time Agent, 2038 (with Jim Hlavaty), 1846, Magellan/Pizarro & Co., Jericho, To Court the King, Phoenicia, Race for the Galaxy, and New Frontiers. He is now a freelance game designer, and has been a full time game designer since the early 2000s, publishing games internationally. He has also worked with Matt Leacock on expansions for Pandemic, as well as Res Arcana.

Lehmann began work on a card game version of Puerto Rico, both working on his own and with the designer Andreas Seyfarth. When his version was not used as part of San Juan, he continued to develop his game, combining it with a previous design for a space-themed customizable card game. The final result was published as Race for the Galaxy by Rio Grande Games.

Race for the Galaxy was an Origins Awards finalist in the "Traditional Card Game" category. Lehmann also received critical acclaim for the game, which has been called one of the best card games by New Indian Express. Meeple Mountain said it had "masterful design" and was still playable 12 years after its initial release.

In 2014, Lehmann designed Roll for the Galaxy with Wei-Hwa Huang, which Financial Times listed in its "Five of the best board games" list in 2023. This version uses a mechanic system involving six-sided dice. Dice Tower Dish said it fixed the perceived issues with complexity some players had with the original game. Lehmann created the Jump Drive expansion in 2016, based on his game The City from Amigo, for new Roll for the Galaxy players.

Lehmann also produced the 2018 standalone addition New Frontiers which allowed players to conquer new worlds and colonize them. In 2022, he published his dice-building game Dice Realms.

== Published games ==
- Fast Food Franchise (Prism Games, 1992)
- Time Agent (Prism Games, 1992)
- Suzerain (Prism Games, 1993)
- Age of Exploration (Prism Games, 1994)
- 2038 - co-designed with Jim Hlavaty (Prism Games, 1995)
- Throneworld (Prism Games, 1997)
- Magellan/Pizarro & Co. (Hans im Glück, Rio Grande Games, 2002)
- Meine Würfel, deine Würfel (My Dice, Your Dice) - a dice game included with 55 (Abacus, 2005)
- 1846 - an 18XX game (Deep Thought Games, LLC, 2005; GMT Games, 2016)
- Jericho (Abacus, 2006)
- To Court the King (Amigo Spiele and Rio Grande Games, 2006; Japanese Edition with new art: Cosaic, 2015)
- Phoenicia (Rio Grande Games/JKLM Games, 2007)
- Race for the Galaxy (Rio Grande Games, 2007)
- The Gathering Storm (Race for the Galaxy expansion 1) (Rio Grande Games, 2008)
- Middle Kingdom (Z-Man Games, 2008)
- New Society (included in the St. Petersburg expansion) (Rio Grande Games, 2008)
- Rebel vs Imperium (Race for the Galaxy expansion 2) (Rio Grande Games, 2009)
- Pandemic: On the Brink (Pandemic expansion) - co-designed with Matt Leacock (Z-Man Games, 2009)
- The Brink of War (Race for the Galaxy expansion 3) (Rio Grande Games, 2010)
- The City (Amigo Spiele, 2011)
- Outpost Kicker Expansion (included in the 2011 Outpost reprint) (Stronghold Games, 2011)
- Starship Merchants - co-designed with Joe Huber (Toy Vault, 2012)
- Pandemic: In the Lab (Pandemic expansion) - co-designed with Matt Leacock (Z-Man Games, 2013)
- Alien Artifacts (Race for the Galaxy expansion arc 2) (Rio Grande Games, 2013)
- Roll through the Ages: the Iron Age (Eagle-Gryphon Games, Pegasus Spiele, 2014; revised edition, 2018)
- Ciúb (Amigo Spiele, 2014)
- Roll for the Galaxy - co-designed with Wei-Hwa Huang (Rio Grande Games, 2014)
- Pandemic: State of Emergency (Pandemic expansion) - co-designed with Matt Leacock (Z-Man Games, 2015)
- Ambition (Roll for the Galaxy expansion) - co-designed with Wei-Hwa Huang (Rio Grande Games, 2015)
- Favor of the Pharaoh (Bezier Games, 2015)
- Xeno Invasion (Race for the Galaxy expansion arc 3) (Rio Grande Games, 2015)
- Pandemic: The Cure - Experimental Meds (Pandemic: The Cure expansion), co-designed with Matt Leacock (Z-Man Games, 2016)
- Jump Drive (Rio Grande Games, 2017)
- New Frontiers (Rio Grande Games, 2018)
- Res Arcana (Sand Castle Games, 2019)
- Rivalry (Roll for the Galaxy expansion) - co-designed with Wei-Hwa Huang (Rio Grande Games, 2019)
- The Expanded City and Eco Expansion (expansions published along with the revised English edition of The City) (Eagle-Gryphon Games, 2019)
- Lux & Tenebrae (Res Arcana expansion) (Sand Castle Games, 2019)
- Dice Realms (Rio Grande Games, 2022)
- Chu Han (Matagot, 2024)

Lehmann has also contributed design ideas to other published games, including Outpost, San Juan, Pandemic: The Cure, the revised edition of Pandemic, and Pandemic Legacy: Season 1.
