= BrettspielWelt =

Website

BrettspielWelt (BSW; German for Boardgame World) is a German online gaming site. It contains online versions of over 70 classical and modern board games and card games, such as Backgammon, Bluff, Carcassonne, Can't Stop, Go, Settlers of Catan, and Tichu.

A Java-enabled browser is required to play, and registering with the site is not required (though recommended, as many players will not play with unregistered users). All major aspects of the Java client, games and website are also available in English. The site is independent and free from advertising, except for indirectly advertising the games themselves. As a result of the site's popularity, some board game publishers have presented new board games on BrettspielWelt before they are first published.

All players begin (by default) in the game manager, which is used by players from many countries. New players having difficulty getting started can introduce themselves to one of the English-speaking communities for advice and help. BSW offers a system for implementing translations.

== History ==
BrettspielWelt started in 1998 as a project by Alexander Zbiek to play board games with his friends over the internet. The first version ran on a workstation in the Leibniz computing centre in Munich. Zbiek then teamed up with Regina Michl, Tobias Lang and Sebastian Mellin. After making the program more stable and expandable, it was released to the public in 2000. It was merged with Copco company in 2008 and eventually became one company.

== Community ==
BrettspielWelt has an optional meta-game for its members, in which each game played earns experience points, credits and resources for the player. The metagame facilitates the building of smaller communities, set up as towns, in which players can meet, chat and play. As a player increases in rank and their virtual wealth increases, they may build a virtual home in the online "world" that includes games that earn credits and resources for the community.

There is a large contingent of English BrettspielWelt players, and several towns aimed primarily at English speakers. These include Concordia, EnglishTown, Smallville, BurgundyRidge, and The.Great.White.North (primarily aimed at Canadians), as well as the multilingual Emerald.City, Whitechapel and PiratesCove. There are also a ChinaTown for Chinese players, Japanese-Isle and Samurai-Village for Japanese, KoreaTown for Koreans and LionRock for Hong Kong players. Other European language groups include DeLageLanden for Dutch and CarcassonnePlage for French players.

== Games ==
The games available on BrettspielWelt are, for the most part, German-style board games, with a few exceptions (Tichu, Go, Can't Stop).

Among the games available are several Spiel des Jahres winners:

- 7 Wonders
- Cafe International
- Carcassonne
- Bluff (Liar's Dice)
- Manhattan
- Settlers of Catan
- Thurn und Taxis

and Deutscher Spiele Preis winners:

- Saint Petersburg
- 6 nimmt!
- Caylus
- Puerto Rico

== Awards ==
BrettspielWelt was nominated for a Webby Award in 2004. It won the People's Voice Award for best Game site.
