= Indian Sudoku Championship =

Annual national Sudoku contest

The Indian Sudoku Championship (commonly abbreviated as 'ISC') is an annual national contest held in India to crown the Indian Sudoku Champion and to select the national team for the Asian Sudoku Championship and World Sudoku Championship. It usually consists of multiple rounds of solving various classic sudoku and its variants, and the scores of players are aggregated for the final rankings. It is conducted by Logic Masters India (commonly abbreviated as 'LMI'), which is the Indian affiliate of the World Puzzle Federation.

Of the 15 national championships held so far, 9 have been won by Rohan Rao, 3 by Ritesh Gupta, 2 by Rishi Puri and 1 by Prasanna Seshadri. The latest ISC was held on 12 December 2021 and was won by 9-time champion Rohan Rao.

The national teams have been representing India at the World Sudoku Championship since 2007.

The qualifications for ISC 2022 is being held as a series of 4 online rounds in collaboration with Sudoku Mahabharat on LMI, followed by an offline finals.

== History ==
The Indian Sudoku Championship has been held offline and online across the years and attracts the top solvers of India. It is a platform for sudoku authors to create their own sudokus for the event, as well as for sudoku enthusiasts to participate and solve them in a national championship involving various sudoku variants.

Since 2016, several online rounds were held across the year followed by an offline finals (except for 2020 and 2021 which were online due to COVID-19 pandemic).

In 2015, 2014, 2013 and 2009, the championship was held as an online contest.

In 2012, the championship was held in collaboration with Times Sudoku Championship (TSC), sponsored by Times of India.

In 2011, 2007 and 2008, regional rounds were held across the major Indian cities followed by an offline finals.

In 2010, the championship was held as part of Techfest, IIT-Bombay.

== Results ==
| Year | Finals Location | Winners | | | Core Organizers |
| Year | Finals Location | Gold | Silver | Bronze | Core Organizers |
|---|---|---|---|---|---|
| 2021 | Online | Rohan Rao | Prasanna Seshadri | Kishore Kumar | Rakesh Rai, Akash Doulani, Priyam Bhushan, R Kumaresan |
| 2020 | Online | Rohan Rao | Prasanna Seshadri | Rishi Puri | Rakesh Rai, Akash Doulani, Priyam Bhushan, R Kumaresan |
| 2019 | Kolkata | Rohan Rao | Kishore Kumar | Prasanna Seshadri | Rakesh Rai, Akash Doulani, Ashish Kumar, Sumit Bothra |
| 2018 | Mumbai | Rohan Rao | Prasanna Seshadri | Pranav Kamesh | Ramesh Swarnakar, Purvi Shah |
| 2017 | Chennai | Rohan Rao | Kishore Kumar | Rishi Puri | Prasanna Seshadri, Rakesh Rai |
| 2016 | Chennai | Rohan Rao | Rakesh Rai | Kishore Kumar | Deb Mohanty, Prasanna Seshadri |
| 2015 | Online | Rishi Puri | Prasanna Seshadri | Rohan Rao | Deb Mohanty |
| 2014 | Online | Rishi Puri | Rohan Rao | Gaurav Korde | Deb Mohanty, Prasanna Seshadri |
| 2013 | Online | Prasanna Seshadri | Rohan Rao | Rishi Puri | Deb Mohanty |
| 2012 | Mumbai | Rohan Rao | Sumit Bothra | Gaurav Korde | Deb Mohanty, Amit Sowani |
| 2011 | Bengaluru | Rohan Rao | Ritesh Gupta | Sumit Bothra | Deb Mohanty, Amit Sowani |
| 2010 | Mumbai | Rohan Rao | Rishi Puri | Gaurav Korde | Deb Mohanty, Amit Sowani |
| 2009 | Online | Ritesh Gupta | Gaurav Korde | Himanshu Mittal | Deb Mohanty, Amit Sowani |
| 2008 | Bengaluru | Ritesh Gupta | Sumit Bothra | Himani Shah | Hendrik Hardeman, Deb Mohanty, Amit Sowani |
| 2007 | Mumbai | Ritesh Gupta | Sumit Bothra | Rajesh Kumar | Hendrik Hardeman |

== Records ==
There have been many interesting finals where top players had a close finish to determine the winner, but the best record is that of Rohan Rao, who has finished on the podium 12 times out of the 14 finals he competed in.

| Name | Gold | Silver | Bronze | Total | #Finals |
|---|---|---|---|---|---|
| Rohan Rao | 9 | 2 | 1 | 12 | 14 |
| Ritesh Gupta | 3 | 1 | 0 | 4 | 7 |
| Rishi Puri | 2 | 1 | 3 | 6 | 10 |
| Prasanna Seshadri | 1 | 4 | 1 | 6 | 7 |
| Sumit Bothra | 0 | 3 | 1 | 4 | 7 |
| Kishore Kumar | 0 | 2 | 2 | 4 | 9 |
| Gaurav Korde | 0 | 1 | 3 | 4 | 8 |
| Rakesh Rai | 0 | 1 | 0 | 1 | 6 |
| Pranav Kamesh | 0 | 0 | 1 | 1 | 4 |
| Himanshu Mittal | 0 | 0 | 1 | 1 | 4 |
| Himani Shah | 0 | 0 | 1 | 1 | 5 |
| Rajesh Kumar | 0 | 0 | 1 | 1 | 13 |

== See also ==
- Times Sudoku Championship (India)
- Asian Sudoku Championship
- World Sudoku Championship
