= Race for the Galaxy =

2007 space-themed economic card game

- Cover Art
- Designers: Tom Lehmann
- Illustrators: Claus Stephan; Martin Hoffmann; Mirko Suzuki
- Publishers: Rio Grande Games
- Players: 2 to 4
- Setup time: 2 minutes
- Playing time: 30–60 minutes
- Chance: Medium
- Skills: Economic management, strategic thought

Race for the Galaxy (RftG), or simply Race, is a card game designed by Thomas Lehmann. It was released in 2007 by Rio Grande Games. Its theme is to build galactic civilizations via game cards that represent worlds or technical and social developments. It accommodates two to four players by default, although expansions allow for up to six players, as well as solo play. The game uses iconography in place of language in some places, with complex powers also having a text description. While appreciated by experienced players for being concise, some new players find the icons difficult to learn and to decipher.

The game won Boardgamegeek's Golden Geek Award for Best Card Game in 2008, Fairplay Magazine's À la carte award for best card game of 2008, and was described by the magazine Tric Trac as "Le jeu de cartes de cette année 2008" ('The 2008 card game of the year').

== Development ==
Race for the Galaxy by Thomas Lehmann began as a card game version of Puerto Rico, with Thomas Lehmann working on his own and in cooperation with Andreas Seyfarth, but Lehmann's version did not make it into publication as San Juan in 2004. Lehmann continued work on the game and made it a space-themed customizable card game; this was ultimately released as Race for the Galaxy by Rio Grande Games in 2007.

== Gameplay ==
Like many other Euro-style games, players win Race for the Galaxy by having the most victory points (VPs) at the end of the game. VPs come from three sources: worlds and developments placed on a player's tableau, and VP chips earned by consuming goods from worlds. To place a world or development, players pay a cost in cards from their hand. Keeping a steady income of new cards throughout the game is important to victory.

=== Phase selection ===
At the start of each round, all players simultaneously and secretly choose one of five phases: Explore, Develop, Settle, Consume, or Produce. Selections are revealed simultaneously. The only phases which actually occur in a round are those selected by players. Additionally, the players who picked a certain phase get a special bonus during that phase, such as the ability to look at more cards during the Explore phase.

Every card in play has powers which are active during various phases. For instance, the development "Investment Credits" has a Develop power which makes placing developments one card cheaper.

A possible starting world from the base game, Epsilon Eridani. This world is worth 1 victory point and has powers during the settle and consume phases (III and IV).

=== Round play ===
Within a round, phases (those selected by players) happen in the following order:

1. Explore – Draw two cards and keep one.
2. Develop – Play a development.
3. Settle – Play a world, either by paying to take it peacefully or by military conquest.
4. Consume – "Ship" resources for cards and VPs. As a bonus activity, players can Trade a resource to earn many cards, but no VPs.
5. Produce – Put a good (a face-down card from the deck) on all production worlds that do not have one.

After all phases are complete, players discard down to a hand limit of 10 cards. Unusually among card games, cards discarded due to the hand limit or when paying a cost are placed face-down (in a "messy" pile to distinguish them from the draw deck), concealing information that could be used to deduce upcoming draws.

Play continues until, at the end of a round, either at least one player has 12 or more cards in their tableau, or the entire starting pool of victory point tokens has been claimed by the players. At that point, the player with the highest total of victory points from tokens and from cards in their tableau is the winner.

=== Race vs. other titles ===
The play style of the game is similar to that of another Rio Grande game, San Juan, which is the card game version of the board game Puerto Rico. Lehmann, Race's designer, developed his own card game version of Puerto Rico at the request of the publisher. Some of its ideas were incorporated in San Juan. Later, Lehmann used those ideas to create a different game, one of space exploration, settlement, and conquest rather than development in the colonial Caribbean.

The principal difference in the playing sequence between Race and Puerto Rico/San Juan is that in the latter games, a given phase can only be chosen by one player each round, and the order of activities is based on player order and the phases each player picks in succession; in Race, multiple players may choose the same phase, and the order of activity execution is fixed.

Wei-Hwa Huang, who is credited as a development assistant for Race, went on to become the primary designer of Roll for the Galaxy (assisted by Tom Lehmann). In this adaptation six-sided dice represent a player's workers, with rolls determining what phases workers are placed in.

== Expansions ==
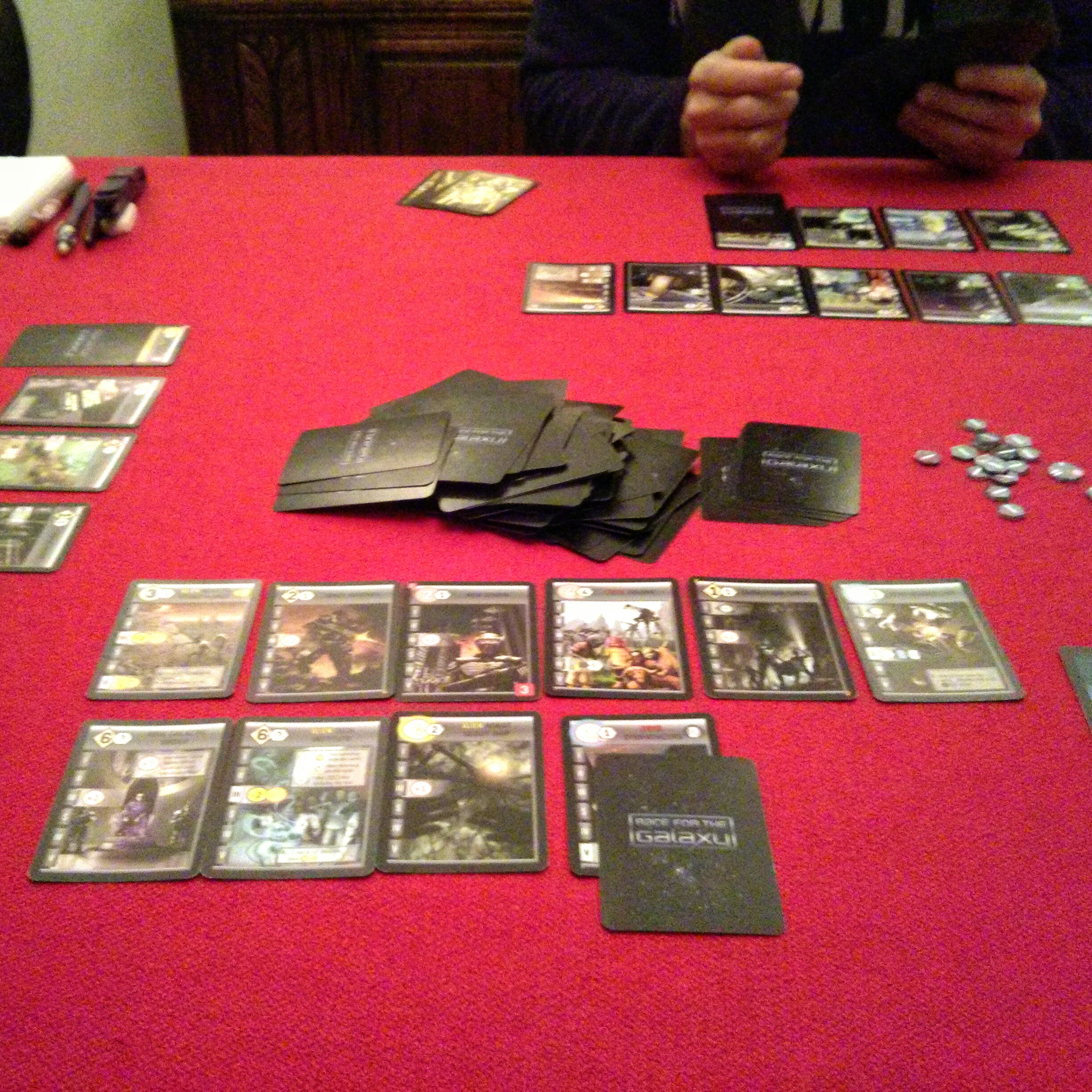
Gameplay with the base set. 10 cards have been played in one player's tableau, so the game is likely to end soon

During playtesting, plans were made for two expansions to add more variety to gameplay, shore up certain strategies, and to accommodate more players. The game's success prompted the publisher to request a third expansion, as well as new expansions not requiring the original trio.

Currently there are five expansions for Race. The first three expansions, Gathering Storm, Rebel vs Imperium, and The Brink of War, comprise the first expansion arc. These expansions thematically focus on a struggle for galactic control between the militarily powerful Imperium and a Rebel uprising. The second arc, which is designed to be played separately from the first, includes only the expansion Alien Artifacts, about the revival of long-dead Alien overseer technology. In the third arc the Xeno Invasion set chronicles a catastrophic invasion by monstrous "Xenos" from a distant world.

All the expansions provide new game cards, starting worlds, and support for at least five players. Many new mechanics also interact with base set keywords, such as "Rebel" or "Uplift".

=== The Gathering Storm ===
The first expansion adds components for a fifth player, additional cards, goals (opportunities to gain extra victory points chosen at random at game start), and rules and components for solo play (against a "robot" player).

=== Rebel vs Imperium ===
The second expansion is intended for use with the first expansion. It adds components for a sixth player, more cards and goals, and direct player interaction in takeovers of other players' military worlds; players who refrain from playing certain cards are immune to conquest. Takeovers are optional and the rules for this expansion encourage trying the game both with and without them. This set also introduces many new Rebel and Imperium Cards and introduces a special two-player scenario where one player takes the role of The Imperium while the other starts with a Rebel homeworld. In this variant the starting hands consist partly of Imperium/Rebel cards and takeovers are allowed.

=== The Brink of War ===
The third expansion adds still more cards, and goals, as well as a new mechanic called galactic prestige. Each round the player(s) with the most prestige earn an additional victory point and possibly a card. Each prestige is worth one victory point at the end of the game, and many of the new cards allow prestige to be spent (for victory points, cards, or other effects). Additionally, a new "once-per-game" action is introduced that allows the user to search the deck for a card meeting a specific stated requirement, or to enhance the bonus the user earns in a round (at the cost of one prestige). The set further extends takeover options: the Interstellar Casus Belli development can allow attacks against anyone, and the Imperium Planet Buster can destroy enemy worlds outright.

=== Alien Artifacts ===
The fourth expansion is used with only the base game and was released during 2013. It includes new explore powers and an optional "orb game" in which players explore for victory points and new powers. Some players have criticized the gameplay of the orb game while praising the game cards in the set, saying that the orb makes the overall game play non-simultaneously and last too long.

=== Xeno Invasion ===
The fifth expansion, published 2015, is for use with the base game only. According to Lehmann, "XI is aimed at intermediate players" and has the most new base cards of any expansion so far. It allows for up to 5 players, and in addition to new world and development cards it includes an optional "Invasion Game", in which players must defeat three waves of Xeno alien invaders. Players can earn bonuses by contributing to the war effort, but the game can also end in two new ways: repulsing the Xeno threat or losing to the invaders.

== Reception ==
Race for the Galaxy was a finalist for the best "Traditional Card Game" at the Origins Awards.

Arjun Sukumaran said that "Thomas Lehmann has received abundant acclaim over the course of his game design career, most notably for his excellent Race for the Galaxy - a game many would consider to be the best card game around."

Matthew Monagle for /Film said in 2021 that "it is a testament to Thomas Lehmann's design that a game released in 2007, an eternity ago in board game years, can still compete with the big boys a decade-plus later."

Race for the Galaxy's solo mode, included in The Gathering Storm expansion, has received critical acclaim. The game was ranked number 67 in the BoardGameGeek 2024 People's Choice Top 200 Solo Games poll.
