= The Philadelphia Inquirer Sudoku National Championship =

Former event in Pennsylvania, United States

The Philadelphia Inquirer Sudoku National Championship, hosted by puzzle master Will Shortz, was an annual sudoku competition run by The Philadelphia Inquirer and held at the Pennsylvania Convention Center in 2007–2009.

Open to a national and international field of contestants from a wide range of ages and backgrounds, the Championship offered three main skill divisions – advanced, intermediate and beginner. In addition to the winners of those three categories, prizes were awarded to many more players who compete in a variety of age groups ranging from under-10 years to 80-and-over.

== History ==
The first annual Philadelphia Inquirer Sudoku National Championship event was held on October 20, 2007, and with 857 contestants, set the world record for “most people playing sudoku simultaneously,” according to Guinness World Records.

=== 2007 ===
On October 20, 2007, at the Pennsylvania Convention Center, the oldest participant of the Championship was 87 years old and the youngest was six years old. Players came from as far away as California and as near as Center City, Philadelphia.

THE 2007 WINNERS

Advanced:

1. Carson Denny, Palo Alto, California ($10,000). He finished the final round in 7 minutes, 9 seconds. He was also awarded a spot on the U.S. National Sudoku Team at the 2008 World Sudoku Championship in India.
2. Tammy McLeod, Los Angeles
3. Sarah Ratcliffe, Glenside

Intermediate:

1. Ron Osher, Stamford, Connecticut ($5,000).
2. Matthew Fabrizio, Philadelphia
3. Vincent DeLuca, Swarthmore

Beginner:

1. Lori Desruisseaux, Elverson, Pennsylvania ($3,000).
2. Danny Choi, Cherry Hill
3. Mathew Bramucci, Lancaster

=== 2008 ===
On October 25, 2008, at the Pennsylvania Convention Center, the oldest participant was 88 years old and the youngest was 7 years old. Players came from as far away as Ireland and Canada, and as near as Center City, Philadelphia.

THE 2008 WINNERS

Advanced:

1. Wei-Hwa Huang, Mountain View, California ($10,000 prize). He finished the final round in 7 minutes, 39 seconds. He was also awarded a spot on the U.S. National Sudoku Team at the 2009 World Sudoku Championship in Slovakia.
2. Thomas Snyder, Palo Alto, California ($2,000). He finished in first place in 2007 and then went on to his second world-championship win.
3. Tammy McLeod, Los Angeles, California ($400).

Intermediate:

1. Chris Narrikkattu, New York ($5,000), 9:32.
2. Vincent DeLuca, Swarthmore, Pennsylvania ($1,000).
3. Brittnay Guld, Philadelphia, Pennsylvania ($200).

Beginner:

1. Lisa J. Haffner, Philadelphia, Pennsylvania ($3,000), 7:40.
2. Lauren Choi, Rockville, Maryland ($600).
3. Stefanie Jasinski, Philadelphia, Pennsylvania ($150).

=== 2009 ===
The 2009 Philadelphia Inquirer Sudoku National Championship took place Saturday, October 24, 2009, at the Pennsylvania Convention Center in Philadelphia.

Advanced:

- First place - Tammy McLeod, Los Angeles, California ($10,000 prize) in 7:41 with no mistakes.
- Second place - Thomas Snyder, Palo Alto, California ($4,000 prize) in 4:14 with three mistakes. Snyder had made a transposition error in his grid costing him the title.
- Third place - Chris Narrikkattu, New York ($3,000 prize) after disqualification of Eugene Varshavsky.
- Disqualified - Eugene Varshavsky, Lawrenceville, New Jersey - incomplete, with 3 numbers filled in after 8 minutes.

Intermediate:

- First place - Davis Borucki, Columbia, South Carolina ($3,000) in 8:42.
- Second place - Andrea Kanner, Boston, Massachusetts ($2,000)
- Third place - Vincent DeLuca, Swarthmore, Pennsylvania ($1,500)

Beginner:

- First place - Natan Tsyrulnik, Shelton, Connecticut ($1,000) in 8:24.
- Second place - Tori Spofford, West Chester, Pennsylvania ($500)
- Third place - Rosalie Hooper, Ambler, Pennsylvania ($300)

Separate 50 dollar prizes were also given in 27 age categories.

Following the tournament, questions were raised by competitors including 2nd-place finisher Thomas Snyder about the performance of Eugene Varshavsky in the tournament. Wearing a hooded sweatshirt during the competition, Varshavsky came nowhere close to his qualifying performance on stage which called into question his abilities as a legitimate sudoku contestant. Following a review of his performance including a retest on similar sudoku puzzles, Varshavsky was disqualified and Chris Narrikkattu, who would have qualified in the same round, was made the third-place winner.

=== 2010 ===
The 2010 World Sudoku Championship was held in Philadelphia, Pennsylvania in April 2010.
