= Logic Masters India =

Indian representative of the World Puzzle Federation

Logic Masters India (commonly abbreviated as 'LMI') is the Indian representative of the World Puzzle Federation (WPF) which is responsible for conducting national sudoku championships since 2008 to select the Indian team for the world championships. It also aims to organize various sudoku and puzzle activities in India.

There are three main contest types: Sudoku Mahabharat, Puzzle Ramayan and Daily Puzzle Test.

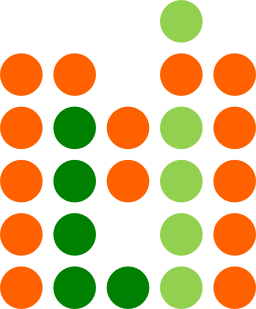
Logic Masters India

== Sudoku Mahabharat & Puzzle Ramayan ==
Each year, the Sudoku Mahabharat (SM) championship consists of 4 online rounds while the Puzzle Ramayan (PR) consists of 6 (approximately one every 2-3 weeks), based on different categories and themes of Sudoku variants (Puzzle types). The online rounds are open to all participants including international solvers.

There are 3-4 spots for the Indian A team for the World Sudoku Championship (WSC) and World Puzzle Championship (WPC), which will be decided during the offline finals of the tournaments.

Each Sudoku Mahabharat round consists of six Standard Sudokus (two 6X6, four 9X9) and six Sudoku Variants (each variant will appear in both sizes, i. e. 6X6 and 9X9).

Each Puzzle Ramayan round consists of three puzzles each in 6 puzzle types within the theme (in double theme rounds, three puzzles each in 3 puzzle types within each theme) and two exploratory variant puzzles in two types within the original theme (in double theme rounds, 2 variant puzzles in one type within each theme).

Participants will get points as allotted for each sudoku correctly submitted. The test uses instant grading where the solver can confirm if the solution is correct immediately after submitting. Each incorrect submission reduces the puzzle's potential score. The first, second, third, and fourth incorrect submissions reduce the potential score to 90%, 70%, 40%, and 0% respectively.

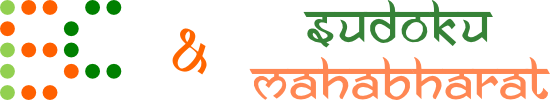
Indian Sudoku Championship (ISC) and Sudoku Mahabharat (SM)

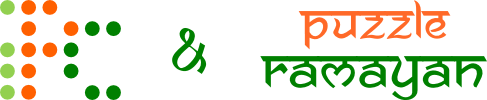
Indian Puzzle Championship (IPC) and Puzzle Ramayan (PR)

=== Sudoku Mahabharat 2024 ===
Round	Author	Dates	India 1	India 2	India 3
Standard & Irregular	R. Kumaresan, Hemant Malani	09-15 Feb 2024	Akash Doulani	Shilpa Nukala	Kishore Kumar
Odd Even & Hybrids	Akash Doulani, Arun Iyer, Pranav Kamesh S	08-14 Mar 2024	Kishore Kumar	Nityant Agarwal	Harsh Poddar
Math & Neighbours	James Peter, Madhav Sankaranarayanan, Puwar Dhruvarajsih	05-11 Apr 2024	Nityant Agarwal	Ashish Kumar	Manjiri
Outside & Converse	Nityant Agarwal, Priyam Bhushan, Jeet Sampat	17-23 May 2024	Kishore Kumar	Akash Doulani	Harsh Poddar

=== Sudoku Mahabharat 2023 ===
Round	Author	Dates	India 1	India 2	India 3
Standard & Odd Even	R. Kumaresan, Hemant Malani, Arun Iyer	20-26 Jan 2023	James Peter	Rohan Rao	Ashish Kumar
Outside & Hybrids	Nityant Agarwal, Akash Doulani, Puwar Dhruvarajsinh	10-16 Feb 2023	Rohan Rao	Kishore Kumar	Ashish Kumar
Math & Irregular	James Peter, Madhav Sankaranarayanan, Priyam Bhushan	03-09 Mar 2023	Rohan Rao	Kishore Kumar	Nityant Agarwal
Neighbours & Converse	Ashish Kumar, Kishore Sridharan, Pranav Kamesh S	24-30 Mar 2023	James Peter	Manjiri	Harsh Poddar

=== Sudoku Mahabharat 2022 ===
Round	Author	Dates	India 1	India 2	India 3
Standard & Neighbours	R. Kumaresan	25 Feb-02 Mar 2022	Rohan Rao	James Peter	Nityant Agarwal
Odd Even & Hybrids	Madhav S. & Arun I.	01 - 06 Apr 2022	Kishore Kumar	Manjiri	James Peter
Converse & Outside	Harmeet S. & Dhruvarajsinh P.	22 - 27 Apr 2022	Kishore Kumar	James Peter	Jaipal Reddy
Math & Irregular	Nityant A. & James P.	27 May - 01 Jun 2022	Rohan Rao	Kishore Kumar	Ashish Kumar

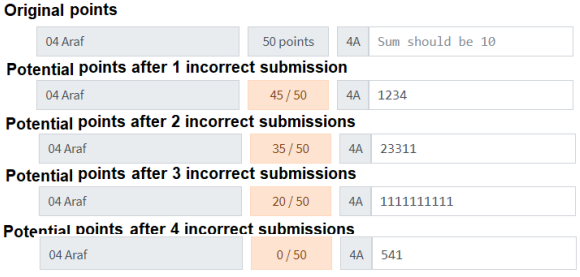
A demonstration of the penalty system

=== Puzzle Ramayan 2024 ===
Round	Author	Dates	India 1	India 2	India 3
Classics	Prasanna Seshadri	19-25 Jan 2024	Ashish Kumar	Nityant Agarwal	Swaroop Guggilam
Loops & Numbers	Ashish Kumar	23-29 Feb 2024	Kishore Kumar	Harmeet Singh	Amit Sowani
Evergreens & Made In India	Madhav Sankaranarayanan	29 Mar – 04 Apr 2024	Swaroop Guggilam	Nityant Agarwal	Kishore Kumar
Word & Object Placement	Chandrachud Nanduri & Prasanna Seshadri	26 Apr - 02 May 2024	Ashish Kumar	Rakesh Rai	Tigran Wadia
Shading & Regions	Priyam Bhushan & Prasanna Seshadri	03-09 May 2024	Ashish Kumar	Nityant Agarwal	Kishore Kumar
Snake & Casual	Nityant Agarwal & Prasanna Seshadri	07-13 Jun 2024	Ashish Kumar	Rakesh Rai	Amit Sowani

=== Puzzle Ramayan 2023 ===
Round	Author	Dates	India 1	India 2	India 3
Classics	Prasanna Seshadri	13-19 Jan 2023	Ashish Kumar	Rohan Rao	Rajesh Kumar
Evergreens & Rule Pool	Chandrachud Nanduri	03-09 Feb 2023	Rohan Rao	Ashish Kumar	Amit Sowani
Shading & Made In India	Ashish Kumar & Pranav Kamesh S	24 Feb – 02 Mar 2023	Rohan Rao	Amit Sowani	Nityant Agarwal
Object Placement & Number Placement	Priyam Bhushan	17-23 Mar 2023	Ashish Kumar	Swaroop Guggilam	Kishore Kumar
Casual & Word	Madhav Sankaranarayanan	07-13 Apr 2023	Swaroop Guggilam	Ashish Kumar	Rakesh Rai
Regions & Loops	Nityant Agarwal	21-27 Apr 2023	Ashish Kumar	Swaroop Guggilam	Rajesh Kumar

=== Puzzle Ramayan 2022 ===
Round	Author	Dates	India 1	India 2	India 3
Classics	Prasanna Seshadri	11 - 16 Feb 2022	Swaroop Guggilam	Ashish Kumar	Rajesh Kumar
Casual & Word	Amit Sowani	18 - 23 Mar 2022	Rakesh Rai	Rohan Rao	Swaroop Guggilam
Regions & Evergreens	Ashish Kumar	8 - 13 Apr 2022	Swaroop Guggilam	Kishore Kumar	Rakesh Rai
Number Placement & Puzz.link	Nityant Agarwal	06 - 11 May 2022	Ashish Kumar	Rohan Rao	Swaroop Guggilam
Loops & Shading	Madhav Sankaranarayanan	03 - 08 Jun 2022	Rohan Rao	Ashish Kumar	Nityant Agarwal
MII & Object Placement	Priyam Bhushan & Chandrachud Nanduri	17 - 22 Jun 2022	Rohan Rao	Ashish Kumar	Nityant Agarwal

== Daily Puzzle Test ==
This contest type is online only and consists of 16 puzzles of the same type. Every puzzle will be live for 30 hours. Cumulative points from each day's solving will determine the final scores.

== See also ==
- Sudoku
- Puzzle
- World Sudoku Championship
- World Puzzle Championship
