= Rohan Rao =

Indian puzzle and sudoku solver

- Born: Mumbai, India
- Years active: 2007–present

Rohan Rao, who goes by the name vopani, is an Indian sudoku and puzzle solver, widely considered as the best sudoku solver of India. He is the reigning Indian Sudoku Champion and Times of India Sudoku Champion. Rao has won 18 national championships, an all-time record, and has been one of the best Indians at the World Sudoku Championship (WSC), World Puzzle Championship (WPC) and Asian Sudoku Championship (ASC). He won the Indian Sudoku Championship nine times, in 2010, 2011, 2012, 2016, 2017, 2018, 2019, 2020, and 2021; the Indian Puzzle Championship five times, in 2010, 2011, 2012, 2015, and 2017; and the Times National Sudoku Championship four times, in 2012, 2015, 2016, and 2019.

Rao was ranked 3rd in ASC 2021, 23rd in WSC 2019 and 39th in WPC 2019. He stood 8th in the World Sudoku Championship 2012 to become the first Indian to be ranked in the top 10 in the world in Sudoku. He stood 3rd at the Asian Sudoku Championship 2018 to become the first Indian to finish on the podium of an international WPF Sudoku Championship. He finished 3rd again at ASC 2019 and improved his performance with a 2nd-place finish at ASC 2020.

He was the director of the World Sudoku Championship 2017 and core organizer of World Sudoku and Puzzle Championship 2017 held in October, 2017 in Bengaluru, India. As part of his puzzling career, Rao has authored and organized various puzzle and sudoku championships, events and workshops across India and the world.

== Championships ==
=== Indian Sudoku Championship ===
Rao won his first Indian Sudoku championship title in 2010, beating veteran solvers Ritesh Gupta (three-time and defending champion), Rishi Puri and Gaurav Korde in the finals to become the youngest ever national champion at the age of 19 years, 9 days. Since then he has won eight more times, making him the most successful player in the tournament.

He finished on the podium for 12 consecutive years (2010–2021). No other player has finished on the podium for more than four consecutive years.

=== Indian Puzzle Championship ===
Rao won his first Indian Puzzle Championship title in 2010, pipping veteran solver Rajesh Kumar to become the youngest ever national champion at the age of 19 years, 240 days. Since then he has won four more times, matching Kumar's tally of five titles.

=== Asian Sudoku Championship ===
The Asian Sudoku Championship was first held in 2018, where Rao stood third. He finished on the podium for four consecutive years with his 3rd place in 2019, 2nd place in 2020 and 3rd place in 2021.

== Career statistics ==
=== National Championships ===
18 gold, 7 silver, 7 bronze

The following are ranks in the Indian Sudoku Championship, Indian Puzzle Championship, and Times Sudoku Championship.

Year	National Championships		
Year	ISC	IPC	TSC
2021	1st	2nd	
2020	1st	3rd	
2019	1st	3rd	1st
2018	1st	2nd	3rd
2017	1st	1st	
2016	1st	2nd	1st
2015	3rd	1st	1st
2014	2nd	2nd	3rd
2013	2nd	4th	3rd
2012	1st	1st	1st
2011	1st	1st	
2010	1st	1st	
2009	4th	2nd	
2008	11th	3rd	

=== Asian Championships ===
4 ASC appearances

The following are ranks in the Asian Sudoku Championship (ASC).

Year	Asian Championships
Year	ASC
2021	3rd
2020	2nd
2019	3rd
2018	3rd

=== World Championships ===
11 WSC appearances, 11 WPC appearances

The following are ranks in the World Sudoku Championship (WSC) and World Puzzle Championship (WPC).

Year	World Championships	
Year	WSC	WPC
2019	23rd	39th
2018	17th	44th
2017	Director	Organizer
2016	18th	28th
2015	14th	42nd
2014	14th	36th
2013	16th	45th
2012	8th	38th
2011	12th	34th
2010	15th	41st
2009	25th	
2008		68th

== See also ==
- Asian Sudoku Championship
- Indian Sudoku Championship
- World Sudoku Championship
