= Australia national sudoku team =

The Australian national sudoku team represents Australia in sudoku competition.

== 2008 World Sudoku Championships ==
In 2008 a group of former University of Western Australia Rugby Club players decided to form a team to send to the World Sudoku Championship in Goa, India despite three of the four team members, Mick Colliss, Hamish Sutherland, Mark Skiffington and Sandy Sutherland, not having played the game before. Dubbed the Numbats, after a small Australian marsupial, the four worked to gain corporate sponsorship for their endeavour. They eventually raised enough money to cover their trip and to provide distinctive uniforms including sporting blazers that closely resembled those worn by Australia's team at the 1936 Olympic Games.

At the championships the team finished last.

In 2009 team vice-captain Mick Colliss wrote a book, published by HarperCollins Australia called Full Contact Sudoku based on the team's experience in Goa.

A documentary Colour by Numbers detailing their exploits aired on ABC Television in April 2010.
