= Games World of Puzzles =

Puzzle magazine

- Categories: Puzzle
- Frequency: Monthly
- First issue: September/October 1977 (Games); May 1994 (Games World of Puzzles); October 2014 (rebranded Games World of Puzzles)
- Company: Games Publications, Inc. (1977–1979); Playboy (1977–86); PSC Publications (1987–90); Bits & Pieces (1991–95); Kappa Publishing (1996–)
- Country: United States
- Language: English
- Website: gamesworldofpuzzles.com
- ISSN: 1074-4355

Games World of Puzzles is an American games and puzzle magazine. Originally the merger of two other puzzle magazines spun off from its parent publication Games magazine in the early 1990s, Games World of Puzzles was reunited with Games in October 2014.

The entire magazine interior is now newsprint (as opposed to the part-glossy/part-newsprint format of the original Games) and the puzzles and articles that originally sandwiched the "Pencilwise" section are now themselves sandwiched by the main puzzle pages, replacing the "feature puzzle" section (they are still full-color, unlike the two-color "Pencilwise" sections.) The recombined title assumed the same 9-issue-per-year publication schedule as the original Games.

== Games ==
Games (ISSN 0199-9788) was a magazine devoted to games and puzzles and, until its 2014 merger was published by Games Publications, a division of Kappa Publishing Group.

=== History ===
Games masthead logos over the years
| January–February 1978 issue |
| September–October 1978 issue |
| January–February 1980 issue |
| September 1985 issue |
| July 1991 issue |

Games debuted with its September/October 1977 issue, published by Games Publications, Inc. The magazine was acquired by Playboy which published it beginning with the March/April 1979 issue. It was acquired by PSC Limited Partnership in 1987, briefly out of business in 1990 (after PSC filed for bankruptcy), and brought back to life in 1991 by the Manhattan-based mail-order company "Bits & Pieces". Kappa Publishing Group acquired it in 1996 and moved the Games office to Kappa's headquarters in Pennsylvania.

=== Style ===
Throughout its publishing history, Games - and continuing with Games World of Puzzles - has differentiated itself from other puzzle magazines by its creative covers that are themselves puzzles, color sections containing feature articles and games, and a large variety of puzzle types, with wit and humor used throughout. Each issue contained feature articles and puzzles in its introductory color section, the "Pencilwise" puzzle section, board and video game reviews in its closing color section, and "Wild Cards".

=== Content ===
All puzzles in the magazine are ranked by difficulty: a one-star (one light bulb) puzzle is an "Easy Hike"; two stars is an "Uphill Climb"; three stars means "Proceed at Your Own Risk". Some puzzles are ranked as a "Mixed Bag" denoted by one filled and one unfilled star, meaning that some may find the puzzle very easy while others will be challenged, that the puzzle may have a range of difficulty with it, or that (like many logic puzzles) it may easily be solved by exhaustive trial and error but requires thinking to solve in a deductive way.

==== Major article ====
Each issue typically has a three to six page article about gaming and hobbies as a broad subject.

==== Color sections ====
Common puzzles in the color sections (including the magazine cover) have included:

- Eyeball Benders which require identification of common objects based on photos taken from odd angles.
- Identification of objects in picture collages of items that share a common theme.
- Photo-mysteries which require the reader to use photos and text to solve a mystery.
- Call Our Bluff, where several small anecdotes of historical fact are mixed in with made-up stories of the same style, and the reader is challenged to determine the fake stories from the real ones. The April 2000 issue had a "Call Our Bluff" article in which, as an April Fool's Day joke, the anecdotes were all true (in spite of the fact that many of them were very hard to believe).
- Picture Tic-Tac-Toe which requires the reader to determine a common theme for each row, column, and diagonal of a 3×3 matrix of pictures.
- Trivia quizzes with both text and pictures as clues.
- Identification of cities or countries from either postcards (with identifying words stripped from each one) or from sections of road maps. (These have also commonly been used for contests in the magazine.)

Recent issues have included a multipart puzzle over several pages, where the solution of each sub-puzzle is used to complete the overall puzzle. Recent versions of these have been based on traveling to various locations in the world, though this aspect is only used for the theme of each sub-puzzle.

==== Pencilwise ====
Pencilwise is the newsprint pencil puzzle section that forms the core of the magazine and contains common puzzle varieties such as:

- crosswords (1, 2, and 3 star difficulty levels, and some called "Pencil Pointers", with clues printed in the grid itself)
- cryptic crosswords (with some variety cryptics)
- word searches
- cryptograms
- "Double Cross" acrostic, which uses the answers to clues to assemble a quotation
- math and logic puzzles
- unique puzzle types such as crossword variations (puzzle variants like "One, Two, Three", where up to three letters can be placed in one square; and "Siamese Twins," with two identical grids and two different sets of clues, forcing the solver to figure out which clue corresponds to which grid
- visual logic puzzles like "Paint by Numbers" and "Battleships"
- cartoon rebuses
- variety of other wordplay and visual puzzles

The last puzzle in "Pencilwise" has generally been "The World's Most Ornery Crossword," a large standard crossword puzzle which has two sets of clues spanning three pages. One set, which is revealed by folding one page in half to hide the second page, consists of "Hard" clues (three stars), while the clues under this fold are "Easy" (one star); the answers to both sets of clues are the same.

Recent years have seen two pages of "Kid Stuff" puzzles aimed at pre-teen children, as well as a collection of assorted puzzles under the title "Motley Stew."

Another feature of "Pencilwise" in recent years has been a "Puzzlecraft" column, authored by Mike Selinker and Thomas Snyder, that describes how readers can make their own puzzles, placed alongside puzzles created by the described techniques.

==== Wild Cards ====
Wild Cards is the section that typically contains one or two pages of puzzle miscellany, such as word games, trivia, or chess problems.

==== Fake Ad ====
Until November 2002, readers were challenged to find the fake advertisement among the legitimate ones in an issue; the last one was for the Red Card, a credit card used to pay off other credit cards.

==== Reviews ====
The magazine regularly features capsule reviews of board/card/video games. Following the 2014 merger, a supplemental feature is This Old Game, an extended article discussing the rules, style, and playability of a game first published in the early/mid-20th century.

==== December issue ====
The December issue each year includes a compilation of new and noteworthy games in its Games 100 list, similar to the German Spiel des Jahres, and usually includes a contest based on this list. More recent years have also included a separate Electronic Games 100, focusing on video games for computer, console, and portable systems. Notable game titles also are introduced into a Games Hall of Fame, updated each year along with the Games 100 list.

=== Contests ===
Most issues used to feature a puzzle-solving contest, often with cash prizes, though this was no longer a regular feature of the magazine by 2010. In the past, the magazine also ran an occasional hidden contest, in which part of the challenge was to find the concealed puzzle with instructions on how to enter (e.g. "You have found the hidden contest. To enter, send us a chain of paper clips."). The standard contest has since been reinstated, with a $100 cash prize for the winner and one-year subscriptions/renewals for five runners-up. Following the merger, the contest was reinstated as a monthly feature.

Readers who write in with mistakes (in a section called "Laundry") or alternate solutions to puzzles (in the "Eureka" section) are often rewarded with a Games T-shirt. Readers may otherwise obtain a Games T-shirt by being a runner-up in a Games contest.

As part of the "Games 100", there is usually a contest to identify selected games featured in that list based on small pictures of the board or playing pieces from the game in a photo montage.

Earlier in its publishing history, the Letters page would also include an "Envelope of the Month", typically a highly decorated envelope or postcard sent in by a reader in response to a contest or general correspondence with the magazine. The winner of this would receive a Games T-shirt. This feature was phased out when the magazine changed publishers and publication schedules.

Games ran two popular contests that recurred many times over the years. One was a scavenger hunt - items in the hunt were usually not rare but could be difficult to locate; others involved finding items meeting specific requirements, requiring interpretation, some puzzle solving, or research. Winners were determined based on the most objects collected that fit the requirements. Another was "Calculatrivia", written by Bob Lodge, where a long equation involving approximately 40 variables was given; each variable was associated with a clue that resulted in a numerical value. Many clues were straightforward trivia, but some required research or other calculation to evaluate. When all variables were accounted for, the equation was solved for X and submitted to Games, along with a list of the individual variable values.

=== Other publications ===
Bygone sister publications of Games include The Four-Star Puzzler (1981–1983), "Games: The Video Edition" (1987), Games Special Edition (late 1980s-1990), Pencilwise Extra (1992-1994), Games Premium Puzzles (1993-1994), and Games World of Crosswords (late 1990s). Children's magazines put out by Games were Games Junior (Oct 1988–Feb 1990) and Zigzag (1995). Games has also published a number of books containing "best-of" puzzle collections.

=== Editors ===
Allen D. Bragdon was the founding editor, and many of the most original and creative aspects of the magazine date from his brief tenure in 1977. Michael Donner, who is usually acknowledged as the Mother of Games and was also one of its founders, was the executive editor from 1977 until 1981, by which time the magazine had already attained a readership in the millions and had become Playboy’s second most important publication.

Will Shortz started at Games in November 1978 and edited the magazine from 1989 to 1990 upon PSC's bankruptcy; he returned upon Bits & Pieces' resuming publication in late 1991, and remained until late 1993 when he became editor of The New York Times crossword puzzle.

The current editorial team includes Jennifer Orehowsky, with help from Kappa Publishing editor Karen Powell. Graphic designers include Kevin Boone. Former Games Editor-at-Large Thomas L. McDonald handles the review department.

== Games World of Puzzles before Games merger ==
May 1994 debut logo

Games World of Puzzles (ISSN 1074-4355) was a puzzle magazine published bimonthly by Games Publications, a division of Kappa Publishing Group. Focusing on written puzzles, it was a merger of two spinoffs of Games, Pencilwise Extra and Games Premium Puzzles. Games World of Puzzles debuted in May 1994 and ran as a separate publication until merged with Games in October 2014. A centerpiece section contained a feature puzzle or puzzles, such as puzzles from the World Puzzle Championship or the annual Lt. Nodumbo puzzle mystery. Until the July 2009 issue it contained a contest in every issue, most often a variety crossword or trivia quiz, and the contest resumed upon the Games merger.

== See also ==
- Game of the Year
- Cross sums
- Games 100
