= Throwing Stones (role-playing game) =

Tabletop role-playing game

- Publisher: Gamesmiths
- Publication date: 1995

Throwing Stones is a role-playing game first published in 1995 by Gamesmiths.

== Contents ==
Throwing Stones is a role-playing game that was sold in tubes which hold seven assorted dice for characters which had been randomly selected from 21 types of fantasy character, one die for monsters, a six-sided die, and a set of rules for characters to duel each other.

== Reception ==
Steve Faragher reviewed Throwing Stones for Arcane magazine, rating it a 5 out of 10 overall. Faragher comments that "What a shame that such a fantastic idea is so shoddily presented. Do get hold of a set and have a look though. It might just change the way you look at roleplaying mechanics for ever."

Tom Lehmann reviewed Throwing Stones for Pyramid #17 (Jan 1996) and stated that "By removing the character sheet largely from play the game actually feels more 'diceless' than some diceless systems - a really strange result from a system based on constantly rolling dice!"

== Reviews ==
- Dragon #228 (April, 1996)
- Casus Belli #90
