= Roll for the Galaxy =

Dice game

- Designers: Wei-Hwa Huang & Tom Lehmann
- Illustrators: Martin Hoffmann; Claus Stephan; Mirko Suzuki
- Publishers: Rio Grande Games
- Players: 2 to 5
- Setup time: 2 minutes
- Playing time: 30 - 60 minutes
- Chance: Medium
- Skills: Economic management, Strategic thought

Roll for the Galaxy is a dice game of building space empires for 2 to 5 players. Designed by Wei-Hwa Huang and Tom Lehmann, it was published by Rio Grande Games in 2014. Player dice represent their empire's populace, whom the players use to develop new technologies, settle worlds, and trade. It is a dice version of an older board game Race for the Galaxy.

== Gameplay ==
In Roll for the Galaxy, each player creates a galactic civilization by recruiting workers (represented by custom dice) to settle worlds and build developments (represented by game tiles), over several game rounds (usually 11-14). Each round consists of several, steps, done simultaneously by all players. Players start each round by secretly rolling their workers to see what their workers wish to do this round. Each player uses one worker to select one of the five possible phases, and then all players reveal their workers. All player‑selected phases occur in numerical order. Workers that complete tasks go to their player’s Citizenry. After the phases, players manage their empires, spending Galactic Credits to recruit workers from their Citizenries back to their cups, to be rolled next round. Rounds repeat until one or both game end conditions are met: all initial VP chips have been earned, or at least one player has 12 or more tile squares in his tableau.

== Expansions ==
The game received two large expansions: Roll for the Galaxy: Ambition (2015) and Roll for the Galaxy: Rivalry (2019).

== Awards and honors ==
- 2015 International Gamers Award - General Strategy: Multi-player Nominee
- 2014 Meeples' Choice Winner
- 2014 Meeples' Choice Nominee
- 2014 Golden Geek Most Innovative Board Game Nominee
- 2014 Golden Geek Board Game of the Year Nominee
- 2014 Golden Geek Best Strategy Board Game Nominee
- 2014 Board Game Quest Awards Game of the Year Nominee
- 2014 Board Game Quest Awards Best Strategy/Euro Game Winner
- 2014 Board Game Quest Awards Best Strategy/Euro Game Nominee

== Reception ==
The reviewer for the Meeple Mountain concluded that the game is better than average for its type, although not the best. The reviewer for Boing Boing found the game's compknets well made and noted that "the number of dice in this game is staggering, and rolling the mounting number of them from your cup is intensely satisfying". Reviewers for Board Game Quest and Rock, Paper, Shotgun concluded that the game's digital version is a successful follow up to the original card game, if somewhat challenging to learn, just like the original. The game was included in the IGN's list of best dice board games for 2023, TheGamer's 2022 list of best space-themed board games and Ars Technica's staff's "best new board games we played in 2015".
