= 6 nimmt! =

Card game

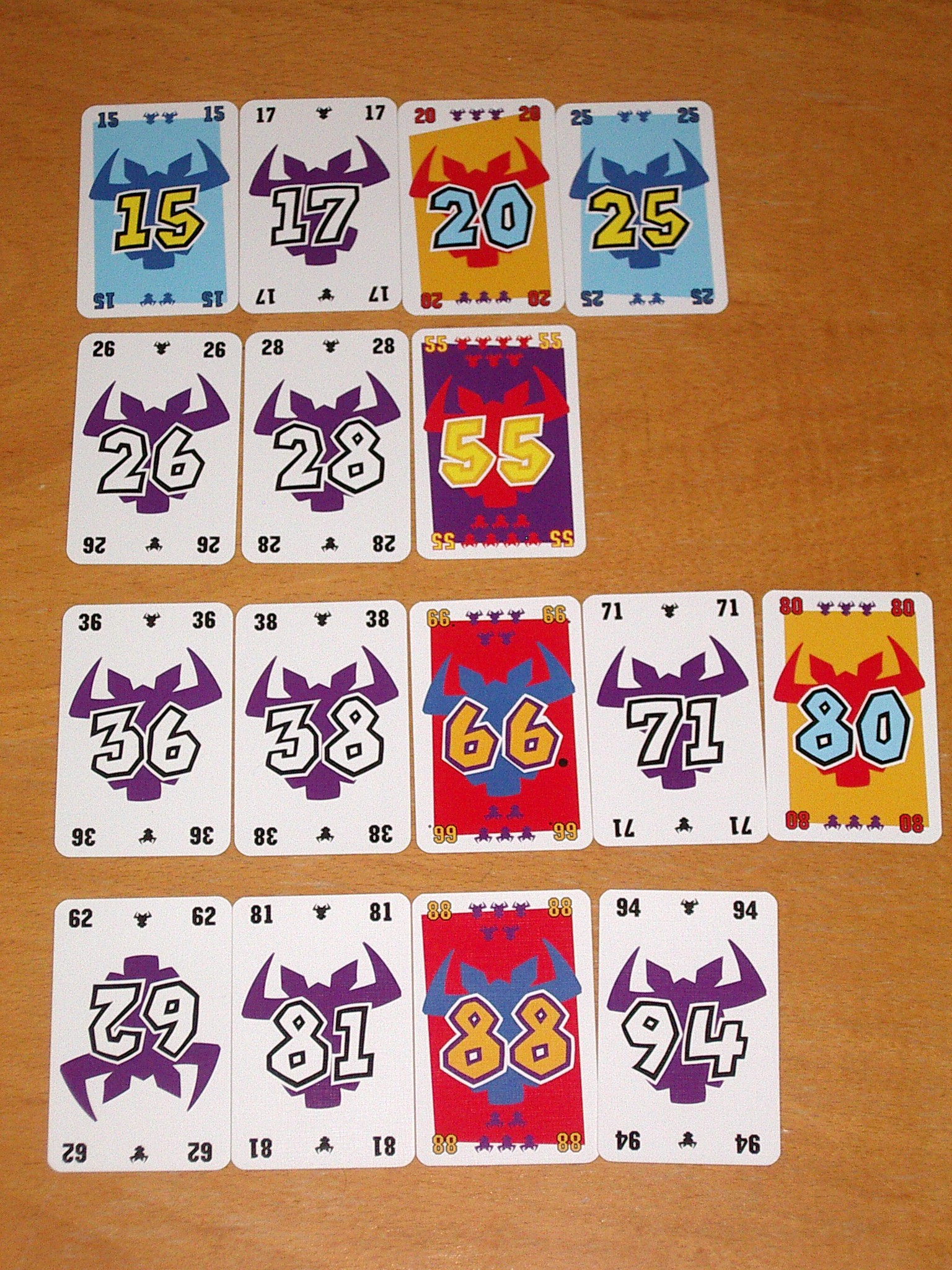
- A typical 6 nimmt! game – adding any card from 81 to 93 would make the third row overflow and its player take all five cards
- Other names: Take 5, Beat the Heat
- Designers: Wolfgang Kramer
- Illustrators: Franz Vohwinkel
- Publishers: Amigo Spiele Hasbro
- Publication: 1994; 32 years ago
- Players: 2–10
- Setup time: 5 minutes
- Playing time: 45 minutes
- Age range: 8+

6 nimmt! / Take 5 / Beat the Heat is a card game for 2–10 players designed by Wolfgang Kramer in 1994 and published by Amigo Spiele and Hasbro . The French version is distributed by Gigamic. This game received the Deutscher Spiele Preis award in 1994.

== Summary ==
The game has 104 cards, each bearing a number and one to seven bull's heads symbols that represent penalty points. A round of ten turns is played where all players place one card of their choice onto the table. The placed cards are arranged on four rows according to fixed rules. If placed onto a row that already has five cards, then the player receives those five cards, which count as points that are totaled up at the end of the round. Rounds are played until a player reaches 66 points, whereupon the player with the fewest points total wins.

== Rules ==
The goal is to be the player with the lowest score. To do this, the players need to avoid collecting cards, since every card has at least one cattle head, which represents one point counted against them.

6 nimmt! is played using a special card deck that has a variable number of small cattle heads on them. The cards are numbered 1 to 104, each giving 1, 2, 3, 5 or 7 points (i.e. cattle heads) to the person who picks it up.

Distribution of points on the cards of 6 Nimmt! and 11 Nimmt! (its sequel)

In the deck there are:

- 1 card with 7 cattle heads—number 55
- 8 cards with 5 cattle heads—multiples of 11 (except 55): 11, 22, 33, 44, 66, 77, 88, 99
- 10 cards with 3 cattle heads—multiples of ten: 10, 20, 30, 40, 50, 60, 70, 80, 90, 100
- 9 cards with 2 cattle heads—multiples of five that are not multiples of ten (except 55): 5, 15, 25, 35, 45, 65, 75, 85, 95
- 76 cards with 1 cattle head—the rest of the cards from 1 through 104

=== Preparation ===
Ten cards are dealt to each player.

Four uncovered cards are arranged on the table to form a vertical line.

=== Gameplay ===
At each turn, each player selects a card to play, and puts the card face down on the table. When all the players have selected a card, the cards are uncovered.

Starting with the lowest-valued card, and continuing in increasing order, each player must put their card at the end of one of the four rows on the table, following these rules:

- The card must be put on a row where the latest (end) card is lower in value than the card that is about to be played.
- The card must be put on the row where the latest (end) card is the closest in value to the card that is about to be played (if your card is 33, then place it next to the 30 not the 29, for example)
- If the row where the played card must be placed already contains 5 cards (the player's card is the 6th), the player must gather the 5 cards on the table, leaving only the 6th card in their place to start a new row. The gathered cards must be taken separated and never mixed with the hand cards. The sum of the number of cattle head on the gathered cards will be calculated at the end of the round.
- If the played card is lower than all the latest cards present on the four rows, the player must choose a row and gather the cards on that row (usually the row with the fewest cattle heads), leaving only the played card on the row.

The cards of all the players are played following these rules, from the lowest player card to the highest one.

At the end of the turn, the players each select a new card to play; this is repeated until 10 turns have been completed or all the cards in the hand have been played.

=== End of the game ===
At the end of a round, each player counts the cattle heads on the cards gathered from the table during the round. The score of each player is collected on the paper and a new hand starts.

The game ends when a player collects a total of 66 or more cattle heads. The winner is the player who has collected the fewest cattle heads.

== Variations ==
=== 6 nimmt! Taktik / Take 5 Tactics ===
To make the game more complex, if there are fewer than 10 players, before starting, remove from the deck the cards higher than 10n + 4 (where n is the number of players). For example, with 5 players, only the cards from 1 to 54 are used; cards 55 to 104 are excluded. With 7 players, only cards 1 to 74 are used. The other rules are unchanged.

This variation is more strategic than the basic rules since it is possible to know which cards have been already played and which ones are available to other players.

=== 6 nimmt! Logik / Take 5 Logic ===
Same rules apply as in previous variant, but before play starts, all cards are placed facing upwards on the table. Starting from a randomly selected player and continuing clockwise each player chooses a card. This continues until each player holds 10 cards. The remaining 4 cards are arranged on the table to form a vertical line. The other rules are unchanged.

=== 6 nimmt! Profi / Take 5 Professional ===
In this variation, the card currently being placed can also go to the left of an existing row of cards, following the same concepts: it has to be lower than the leftmost card in that row and it has to be closest in value to that card (for example, place the 10 to the left of 11 instead of 15). Placing a card between two existing cards of a row is not allowed. If a card could be placed both at the start of one row or at the end of another row, the closest card (in number) determines where it will go. If placing the 6th card to the left of a row, you take the whole row and leave your card as the start. This variation is implemented online at BrettspielWelt and makes the game more unpredictable.

=== Children's version ===
This version is for children who understand bigger/smaller numbers or to teach them the concept. It teaches kids to count and learn about bigger/smaller numbers. A review from Spieletest praised the version's engagement, replayability, and accessibility.

== Tournaments ==
Since 2018, Amigo Spiele has run an annual world championship tournament for 6 nimmt! as well as local regional tournaments.

== Reception ==
Upon its release, the game received the Deutscher Spiele Preis award in 1994. It was also recommended for the 1994 Spiel des Jahres. Stewart Woods, writing in Eurogames: The Design, Culture and Play of Modern European Board Games, commented on the game's theme, describing it as lacking except for the packaging and cards. Similarly, Mikko Saari from Lautapeliopas critiqued the theme while complimenting its accessibility and addictiveness.
