= Ulrich Voigt =

German chess player and puzzle champion

Ulrich Voigt is a German chess player and puzzle champion. He is an eleven-time World Puzzle Champion, and the most successful individual contestant. He was born in 1976 in Borna near Leipzig and currently lives in Freiburg.

Voigt started playing chess at the age of five; he is a FIDE Master with an ELO of over 2300.

== Championships ==
- World Puzzle Champion 2000, 2001, 2003, 2005, 2006, 2008, 2009, 2012, 2013, 2014, 2016.
