= To Court the King =

Dice game

- Designers: Tom Lehmann
- Illustrators: Volkan Baga
- Publishers: Amigo Spiele (German); Rio Grande Games (English)
- Publication: 2006
- Players: 2-5
- Setup time: Approx. 5 minutes
- Playing time: 45 minutes
- Chance: Die rolling

To Court the King is a dice-based board game for 2–5 players designed by Tom Lehmann. It was published in German by Amigo Spiele as Um Krone und Kragen (Around Crown and Collar) in 2006, and in English as To Court the King by Rio Grande Games. The basic mechanics of rolling and re-rolling dice have drawn comparisons to the game of Yahtzee.

== Publication history ==
When Amigo Spiele was designing this game, they invited players to comment on the ongoing development and make suggestions. This started with the initial conceptualization, and continued through the prototype game, initial sketches of the character cards, final oil paintings, and selection of the symbols appearing on each card. Players were also invited to submit suggestions for a game title, and one of them, Um Krone und Kragen, was chosen.

== Description ==
=== Components ===
The game components are:

- 60 character cards with 19 different characters
- 12 dice
- 5 character overview cards
- a starting player marker
- rulebook

=== Gameplay ===
For setup, the character cards are distributed in the middle of the table.

The first player receives the starting player marker and starts a round of dice rolling with three dice. After the first roll, the active player may choose to reserve any number of those dice (but must choose at least one), and then re-rolls the rest. The active player can repeat this process a second time. Once the active player is done rolling, they may use those dice to claim any of the character cards. Different cards will require different combinations of dice. The Laborer, for example, requires a total of 15 or greater. The Knight requires 5 of a kind. Each character card claimed will give the owner an additional ability, ranging from rolling more dice or having additional re-rolls to the ability the change the die to the number of your choice, but a player cannot claim more than one of any type of character. Claimed cards are placed face-up in front of the owner.

Once the first player is finished, play then passes to the player on the left.

Once everyone has had a chance to roll dice and claim characters, the starting player marker is passed to the right, and the new starting player begins a new round of dice rolling.

Dice-rolling abilities gradually progress due to abilities conferred by owned character cards.

=== Endgame ===
The first player to roll seven identical dice acquires the king and queen. One final round of dice rolling follows this action, where each player is given the opportunity to wrest ownership of the king from the current owner by rolling a better dice result than the current owner rolled.

If the king is successfully claimed by another player during this final round, the owner of the queen has one last chance to roll a better total of dice to win back the king.

=== Victory conditions ===
After the final round of dice rolling is complete, the owner of the king is the winner.

== Reception ==
The independent board game review site Games of Tradition gave this game an above average rating of 7.5 out of 10, saying "Typically played under 45 minutes, this is also a good family filler: the rules are easy, there is competition, and even kids from 10 years old will enjoy it. On a rainy Sunday afternoon, you’ll appreciate opening the box for a few rounds." The reviewer did warn that due to the requirement for a table, it might not be suitable for camping, but concluded that it "will be a great one for a nice friendly evening."

On the German game website Reich der Spiele, Carsten Pinnow found the game generally took about 10–20 minutes per person, so that a game with five players could much longer than the 45 minutes claimed by the publisher; this increased substantially if some of the players "take their time when they have already collected five or six cards." Although Pinnow liked the "excellently designed character cards", he criticized the tiny pictograms on the cards, saying, "even people with normal eyes need a magnifying glass." He concluded that if played with fewer players, the game "offers relaxed gaming fun."

On the German game review website Holgs Spieleteufel, the reviewer found the cumulative dice rolling was hard for new players to understand, and led to "considerable delays. If five newcomers play, the game will certainly last longer than the specified 45 minutes." The reviewer also didn't like the fact that your character cards improve your chances in the final round but have no bearing on the final point total. "It can happen that you were better than everyone else during the game, but in the end you did not win because you had a bad final round [...] There is the feeling that you 'struggle' for 45 to 60 minutes and in the last round everything depends on a single happy or unfortunate roll of the die." Despite this, the reviewer concluded, "I really liked this strategic dice card game [...] but I will not play with more than three players again, unless everyone knows the game well and is very familiar with the requirements and skills of the characters."

On the German game review site Starstpieler, the reviewer admired the high production values of the components and "beautiful artwork"of the cards, but found the game "a bit too lengthy." The reviewer also felt that new players had difficulties learning the various abilities of the character cards. The reviewer concluded with a thumbs up, but recommended not playing with any more than 3 players to shorten the length of the game.

== Awards ==
This game was nominated for the following awards:

- 2006 Österreichischer Spielepreis [Austrian Game Prize], (Wiener Spiele Akademie [Vienna Games Museum]) in the "Spiele Hit mit Freunden" category [Game Hit with Friends].<
- 2006 International Gamers Awards: General Strategy, Multi-player
- 2006 Golden Geek (BoardGameGeek): Best Light/Party Game Nominee
- 2007 Golden Geek: Best Party Board Game; Best Family Board Game
