= Fillomino =

Grid-based logic puzzle

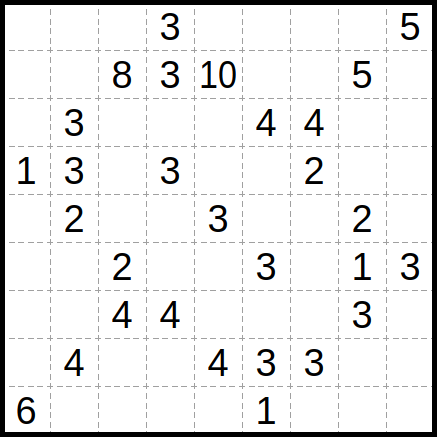
Moderately difficult sample puzzle

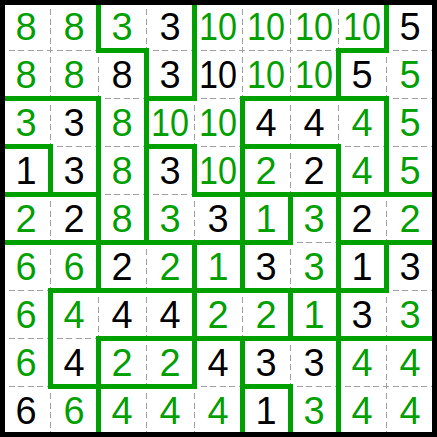
Solution for the sample puzzle

Fillomino (フィルオミノ) is a type of logic puzzle initially published in the 1980's in Japan in the magazine Puzzle Communication Nikoli, and since replicated by many publishers in different countries. Other published titles for the puzzle include Allied Occupation.

== Rules ==
Fillomino is played on a rectangular grid with no standard size; the internal grid lines are often dotted. (When published as Allied Occupation in the World Puzzle Championship, the cells of the grid are circular, but this is purely an aesthetic concern.) Some cells of the grid start containing numbers, referred to as "givens". The goal is to divide the grid into regions called polyominoes (by filling in their boundaries) such that each given number n in the grid satisfies the following constraints:

- Each clue n is part of a polyomino of size n;
- no two polyominoes of matching size (number of cells) are orthogonally adjacent (share a side).

It is possible for two givens with matching number to belong to the same polyomino in the solution, and for a polyomino to have no given at all.

== Solution methods ==
It is common practice in solving a Fillomino puzzle to add numbers to the empty cells when it is determined what size polyomino each must belong to; these numbers are effectively treated identically to the givens. As well as making it clear where many border segments must be drawn—such as between any two differing numbers, or surrounding a region of matching numbers whose quantity is that number—it also permits the second part of the puzzle's rule to be visualized as simply "the same number cannot appear on both sides of a border", which greatly accelerates solving. A curious side effect of numbering every cell is that when the puzzle is completed, the numbers alone unambiguously define the solution, the actual borders being trivially deducible. This makes communication of a solution without a grid quite feasible; indeed, solutions for Allied Occupation give only the numbers. (Nikoli always publishes solutions to their Fillomino puzzles with both the polyomino borders drawn in and numbers given in every cell.)

The typical means of starting a Fillomino puzzle is to draw in the obvious borders between non-matching givens and surrounding all polyominoes completed by the givens alone ('1's, pairs of orthogonally adjacent '2's, and so on). From there, the solver searches for three things, possibly in combination:

- Potential overloads. Each polyomino in the solution, if it were completely numbered, would contain matching numbers whose quantity is that number. If there is a place in the grid where adding a particular number would result in an orthogonally-contiguous region of too many copies of that number, then borders to that cell from those numbers may be drawn in. Often the givens alone provide these, most commonly a pair of diagonally adjacent '2's: placing a '2' in either of the cells that share a side with both givens would result in an overload, so four cell borders may be drawn in (in the shape of a plus sign) separating the '2's.
- Limited domains. Every number in the grid - whether given or deduced - must ultimately be bordered into a region with that number of cells in it. Often, a number will require other cells to be in its region due to not having any alternative location to expand into. The most obvious case is a number (other than 1) bordered on three sides; the cell sharing the fourth side must belong to the same region, and consequently can bear the same number. The same principle applies to numbers bordered on only two sides but cannot possibly expand into enough cells in only one direction, and so on.
- Defined cells. In more challenging circumstances, sometimes working with the empty cells is easier than working with numbers. The most obvious case is when a single cell without a number becomes completely surrounded; without any help from other numbers, that cell must be a monomino, and can be marked with 1. Similarly, two orthogonally adjacent empty cells surrounded together must be a domino, as two monominos cannot share a side. Even cells in regions not completely surrounded may be defined; a common occurrence is for an empty cell as part of a small region mostly bordered by solved polyominoes to have only one legal size of polyomino available to it, with other sizes being too large or would result in matching-size polyominoes sharing a side. This is perhaps best recognized by considering what number can legally be placed in such a cell and determining that only one exists.

== Variants ==
Fillomino adapts to different geometries; hexagonal grids can be used, with the only change in the rules being replacing all instances of polyomino with polyhex. Another variant was published by Nikoli under the name NIKOJI; letters are used as givens instead of numbers, where the letters and polyominoes have a one-to-one correspondence and only matching letters have matching polyominoes (in size, shape, orientation, and letter position).

A computer-based variant of the game in which the player enters numbers (the computer draws the boundaries for the player) is known "Filling" and is part of the "SGT-Puzzles" package.

An iOS mobile variant of Fillomino, named Fields, was launched in 2013.
