= Outpost (board game) =

- Publishers: TimJim Games
- Players: 3–8
- Setup time: 5–15 minutes
- Playing time: 1.5 to 3 hours
- Chance: Low, card draw
- Skills: Simple mathematics; such as counting, adding and subtracting Social skills

Outpost is a board game published by TimJim Games from 1991 to 1994.

== Gamplay ==
Players start with factory and population tokens and compete to acquire victory points through stylized economic activity using production output cards to the buy more factories and population, and special ability cards including the titular Outpost.

== Publication history ==
In 2011 Stronghold Games reprinted Outpost with a new "kicker" mechanic providing additional cards to bid on.

== Reception ==
Herb Helzer reviewed Outpost in White Wolf #36 (1993), rating it a 3 out of 5 and stated that "Outpost's biggest drawback is that the quality components and limited print run push the cost of this simple, entertaining game up [...] It would be more appealing if the board was printed on simple card stock and the box was the size of other card games like Nuclear Proliferation. The savings could be passed on to consumers. At [a lower price] this would earn a higher rating."
