= Thomas Snyder =

American puzzle designer (born c.1980)

Thomas Snyder (born c. 1980) is an American puzzle creator and world-champion sudoku and logic puzzle solver. He is the first person to win both the World Sudoku Championship (3 times) and the World Puzzle Championship. Snyder writes a puzzle blog as Dr. Sudoku.

== Early life and education ==
Thomas Snyder grew up in the suburbs of Buffalo, New York. He attended Amherst Central High School before getting chemistry degrees from the California Institute of Technology and Harvard University and doing post-doctoral work at Stanford University's bioengineering department.

== Puzzle-related work ==
Thomas Snyder has contributed puzzles to various puzzle-related publications including GAMES Magazine and Wired. He has also written puzzles for events including the World Sudoku Championship, U.S. Puzzle Championship, the MIT Mystery Hunt, Gen Con, and the Microsoft Puzzle Picnic.

In early 2012, Snyder founded his publishing company Grandmaster Puzzles. On April 9, 2012, he began selling his first title from the newly formed company, The Art of Sudoku. On December 31, 2012, Snyder began the newest version of his puzzle blog The Art of Puzzles coinciding with the relaunch of his Grandmaster Puzzles web site.

Snyder holds several puzzle-solving titles as well, with his 2006 U.S. Puzzle Championship win being the earliest. Snyder has represented the United States ten times at the World Puzzle Championship, including six times when the US won the team competition (2006–8, 2010–11, 2013). He was the top individual at the 27th World Puzzle Championship held in Prague in November 2018.

== Puzzle championships ==
- World Sudoku Champion 2007, 2008 & 2011
- World Puzzle Champion 2018
- U.S. Sudoku Champion 2007
- U.S. Puzzle Champion 2006–2010, 2012, 2017, 2019, 2024
