= Saint Petersburg (board game) =

Board game

St. Petersburg
- Box cover of Saint Petersburg
- Designers: Michael Tummelhofer
- Publishers: Rio Grande Games; Hans im Glück; 999 Games
- Players: 2-4
- Setup time: 2-5 minutes
- Playing time: 45 minutes
- Chance: Medium
- Age range: 10 and up
- Skills: Strategic thought

Saint Petersburg (German: Sankt Petersburg) is a card-driven Eurogame, with the design of the game credited to Michael Tummelhofer, a pseudonym for Michael Bruinsma, Jay Tummelson and Bernd Brunnhofer. Most of the design work was done by Brunnhofer. The game was published in 2004 by Hans im Glück and Rio Grande Games, and won the Deutscher Spiele Preis and International Gamers Award for that year.

The first expansion, by Karl-Heinz Schmiel, is The Banquet, appearing first as an insert in a magazine, and consists of 12 new cards (3 normal and 9 special). The second expansion, by Tom Lehmann, is The New Society and consists of 36 cards (28 normal, 7 replacement, and a fifth role card), plus rules to expand the game to five players. Both expansions were bundled together and sold as the St. Petersburg Expansion.

In 2014, a successful crowdfunding campaign on the German website Spieleschmiede led to the printing of a second edition of Saint Petersburg. This edition included brand-new art for all of the cards; rebalanced some of the cards; and added a new expansion, The Market, which introduced a new scoring mechanism and allowed five players to play the game, replacing The New Society as the recommended five-player expansion. This edition also included the new cards from both expansions from the first edition plus four brand-new expansion modules.
