= Asian Sudoku Championship =

Annual international sudoku competition

The Asian Sudoku Championship (ASC) is an annual international sudoku competition organised by a member of the World Puzzle Federation (WPF). The first official event was held in Jeju Island, South Korea in 2018 and the latest event was held in Chennai, India in 2025. National teams are determined by local affiliates of the WPF. The competition typically consists of several classic sudokus and variations to be solved by all competitors over multiple timed rounds. The competition did not take place in 2021 and 2022 due to the COVID-19 pandemic.

In the individual championship, Seungjae Kwak of South Korea, Kota Morinishi of Japan and Sun Cheran of China, each has won one title.

In the team championship, India and Japan have won twice.

== Results ==
Year	City	Country	Individual			Team		
Year	City	Country	Gold	Silver	Bronze	Gold	Silver	Bronze
2025	Chennai	India	(Japan) Ken Endo	(Japan) Hideaki Jo	(India) Kishore Sridharan	Japan	India	United Nations
2024	Shizuoka	Japan	(China) Hu Yuxuan	(Japan) Ken Endo	(Thailand) Sinchai Rungsangrattanakul	China	Thailand	India
2023	Jeju Island	South Korea	(Japan) Kota Morinishi	(India) Prasanna Seshadri	(China) Qianzi Li			
2020	Hyderabad	India	(China) Sun Cheran	(India) Rohan Rao	(India) Prasanna Seshadri	India	China	Japan
2019	Pampanga	Philippines	(Japan) Kota Morinishi	(South Korea) Seungjae Kwak	(India) Rohan Rao	India	Japan	Philippines
2018	Jeju Island	South Korea	(South Korea) Seungjae Kwak	(Japan) Ken Endo	(India) Rohan Rao	Japan	India	South Korea

== Records ==
Most of the champions have won with a considerable lead but the lower ranks have been closely contested.

Name	Gold	Silver	Bronze	Total
(Japan) Kota Morinishi	2	0	0	2
(Japan) Ken Endo	1	2	0	3
(South Korea) Seungjae Kwak	1	1	0	2
(China) Sun Cheran	1	0	0	1
(China) Hu Yuxuan	1	0	0	1
(Japan) Hideaki Jo	0	1	0	1
(India) Rohan Rao	0	1	2	3
(India) Prasanna Seshadri	0	1	1	2
(India) Kishore Sridharan	0	0	1	1
(Thailand) Sinchai Rungsangrattanak	0	0	1	1
(China) Qianzi Li	0	0	1	1

== See also ==
- World Sudoku Championship
- World Puzzle Federation
