= San Juan (card game) =

Card game

- A game in progress
- Designers: Andreas Seyfarth
- Publishers: Alea; Rio Grande Games
- Publication: 2004
- Players: 2 to 4
- Setup time: 1–2 minutes
- Playing time: 45–60 minutes
- Chance: Medium
- Age range: 10 and up
- Skills: Economic management, strategic thought

San Juan is a card game designed by Andreas Seyfarth and published in 2004 by Alea in German and by Rio Grande Games in English. The game is derived from the board game Puerto Rico, and takes its name from San Juan, the capital city of Puerto Rico.

The game uses a unique deck of 110 cards and props for two to four players. The object of the game is to compile the maximum number of victory points by creating buildings and producing commodities. The structure of the game strongly mirrors that of Puerto Rico, in that players attempt to accumulate victory points by constructing buildings, each of which provides a special ability, and producing and selling goods. Players take turns by selecting one of several roles to fulfill, which triggers the specific action for that role, and gives a special advantage to the person who chose it. For instance, if a player were to choose Builder as their role, everyone would be given a chance to build a building, and the player who selected Builder would receive a discount.

Many elements of Puerto Rico were changed, simplified, or removed for purposes of shortening the game, and allowing for only cards rather than additional wooden tokens. Most notably:

- Goods can only be sold for money, not shipped for victory points. Hence, there is no Captain role.
- There are no colonists in the game. Hence, there is no Mayor role.
- There is no exclusivity when selling goods: Multiple players may sell the same good without restriction.
- Unselected roles do not receive bonus pay.
- The additional role, Councillor, lets players draw two cards and keep one. (The privilege lets a player draw another three cards.)

The cards, each of which depict a building and describe its ability, serve multiple purposes: A card in a player's hand is, at the same time, both money used for building, and a potential building to be built. Additionally, the cards are used to represent goods produced in any Production building.

As each building provides a number of victory points, players attempt to gain the highest score before the end of the game. There is no direct player interaction; Players affect each other by selecting roles at moments less opportune for their opponents.

== See also ==
- Race for the Galaxy
