= Cracking the Cryptic =

English YouTube channel

Cracking The Cryptic
- Current channel logo

YouTube information
- Channel: Cracking The Cryptic
- Years active: 2017–present
- Genre: Puzzle
- Subscribers: 708 thousand
- Views: 322 million
- Last updated: 9 October 2026
- Website: crackingthecryptic.com

Cracking the Cryptic (CTC) is a YouTube channel dedicated to paper-and-pencil puzzles: primarily sudoku, but also cryptic crosswords and other types of number-placement, pencil, and word puzzles. They occasionally stream puzzle videogames on YouTube.

The channel was set up in 2017 by two friends from England: Simon Anthony, a former investment banker, and Mark Goodliffe, a financial director. Anthony is a former member of the UK's world sudoku and world puzzle championship teams, while Goodliffe is a 14-time winner of the Times Crossword Championships and UK sudoku champion.

Each video is generally composed of one of the two hosts presenting a puzzle with given rules and then solving it in real time, with their live commentary. The channel features both standard and variant puzzles.

During the COVID-19 pandemic, the channel grew in popularity, and as of 9 October 2026 it had 708,000 subscribers, with the most popular video receiving over 10 million views.

The music played at the beginning and end of many videos is Mozart's Piano Sonata No. 16, nicknamed Sonata facile or Sonata semplice.

== Other activities ==
The channel has produced twelve Sudoku apps based on Sudoku variants: Classic, Chess, Miracle, Sandwich, Thermo, Killer, Arrow, Domino and Line Sudoku.

In October 2020, a Kickstarter crowdfunding campaign was announced in order to produce a physical book with some of the channel's most popular puzzles. The campaign reached its initial target within 24 hours. A second volume was funded in October 2022.

In addition to paper-and-pencil puzzles, the pair stream puzzle video games such as The Witness, Baba Is You, Blue Prince and Return of the Obra Dinn.
