= Thurn and Taxis (board game) =

Board game

- The box cover of Thurn and Taxis
- Designers: Karen and Andreas Seyfarth
- Publishers: Hans im Glück; Rio Grande Games; 999 Games
- Players: 2 to 4
- Setup time: 5–10 minutes
- Playing time: 45–60 minutes
- Chance: Medium
- Age range: 10 and up
- Skills: Strategic thought

Cities featured on the boards of the original game (red dots) and the Power and Glory expansion (blue dots plus Würzburg, featured in both games) on a map of present-day Germany, Austria and Switzerland, with names spelled according to the boards (S. = Sigmaringen). Łódź (from the original game), Amsterdam, Rotterdam and Brussels (from the expansion) have been omitted.

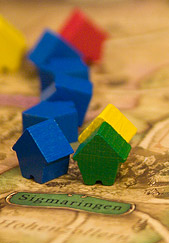
Game board detail showing a city (Sigmaringen), roads leading from it, and a number of player markers. The middle three blue markers have not been placed on cities as they would be in an actual game.

Thurn and Taxis is a board game designed by Karen and Andreas Seyfarth and published in 2006 by Hans im Glück in German (as Thurn und Taxis) and by Rio Grande Games in English. In the game, players seek to build postal networks and post offices in Bavaria and surrounding areas, as did the house of Thurn und Taxis in the 16th century. The game won the prestigious 2006 Spiel des Jahres award.

== Gameplay ==
The board is a map of southern Germany and nearby parts of other countries; it is marked into nine provinces, most of which are grouped into five regions. The map shows 22 cities and a network of roads connecting them. Each player has a supply of 20 markers (houses) to place on the cities. Each city may be marked once by each player and the markers remain in place.

At each turn, the players draw one or more cards representing cities, then play one or more cards, forming or extending a route through successive cities along a sequence of roads. The route may be extended at either end but cannot include the same city twice. After reaching a certain length, a route may be closed and scored. The player then puts markers on some of the cities on the route that he or she has not marked already — either choosing one city in each province traversed by the route, or choosing one province and marking all of its cities that are on the route.

Points are awarded for the length of the route, for marking all cities in any of the different regions, for marking a city in every province, and for completing routes at least as long as a succession of target lengths that rise as the game progresses. Play ends after each player has had an equal number of turns and at least one player has either run out of markers or completed the sequence of target lengths; the first player to satisfy either condition also receives a bonus point. In most cases, each successive instance of scoring points for the same thing is worth less; for example, the first player to dominate the region of Baden scores 3 points, the second scores 2, and the third only 1.

== Expansions and spinoffs ==
Three expansions have been released for Thurn and Taxis. The first, Der Kurier der Fürstin, was a small expansion released in the October 2005 issue of Spielbox magazine which adds letter tokens and a messenger to the game.

The second "expansion", Thurn and Taxis: Power and Glory (German, in an apparent allusion to Gloria, princess of Thurn and Taxis, Glanz und Gloria, lit. Splendour and Glory), is really more of a distinct game, using new region and carriage cards, a new map, and significantly changed route-building rules.

The third expansion Alle Wege führen nach Rom (English: All Roads Lead to Rome) can only be played with the base game, and consists of two small expansions, "The Audience" and "Offices of Honor". While the first two boards show somewhat realistic representations of Southern and Northern Germany, the Rome expansion makes no reference to Italian geography.

== Reception ==
Ed Greenwood comments: "Thurn and Taxis is one of those rare games that isn't blood-and-guts, doesn't take forever to play, boasts remarkably effective and simple rules, and can be enjoyed over and over by both novice players aged 10 and up and hardcore strategists of considerably more years. Its somewhat obscure theme is even presented in a way that's appealing to those of us without doctorates in European history."

The editors of Computer Games Magazine presented Thurn and Taxis with their 2006 "Best Boardgame" award.

== Reviews ==
- Pyramid
