= Andreas Seyfarth =

German-style board game designer (born 1961)

- Born: 6 November 1961 (age 64); Munich
- Occupation: Game designer
- Years active: 1991 – present
- Notable work: Puerto Rico, Max and Moritz, Manhattan, Thurn und Taxis

Andreas Seyfarth (born 6 November 1962) is a German-style board game designer, who is most famous for creating Puerto Rico, which is highly ranked on BoardGameGeek. In 2002, the game was awarded first place for the prestigious Deutscher Spiele Preis (German for German Game Prize). Seyfarth also received the crown jewel of German-style board-game awards, the Spiel des Jahres (German for Game of the Year) in 1994 and 2006 for his games Manhattan and Thurn and Taxis respectively.

Seyfarth married his wife Karen in 1988. He credits her with playtesting and helping design most of his games. Additionally, she is the co-author of Thurn and Taxis. Seyfarth works as a financial controller at Deutsche Telekom.

== Games ==
- Zorro: The Fight Against Alcalde (1990)
- Zorro (1993)
- Spiel des Friedens (1993)
- Waldmeister (1994)
- Manhattan (1994)
- Puerto Rico (2002)
- Puerto Rico Expansion (2004)
- San Juan (2004)
- Thurn and Taxis (2006, with Karen Seyfarth)
- Airships (2007)
