= Manhattan (board game) =

1994 board game

- Designers: Andreas Seyfarth
- Publishers: Hans im Glück
- Publication: 1994
- Players: 2-4
- Playing time: 45 minutes

Manhattan is a board game designed by Andreas Seyfarth. In the game, players aim to construct and control skyscrapers that will award points. Manhattan received generally positive reviews and won the 1994 Spiel des Jahres award.

== History ==
The game was designed by Andreas Seyfarth, a previously obscure designer who became well known for this game and later released Puerto Rico. Inspired by the idea of "to rise a flat game in the third dimension", the game was originally published by the German company Hans im Glück.

The English-language version was published by Mayfair Games in 1996, and a Rio Grande version released in 2007.

== Gameplay ==
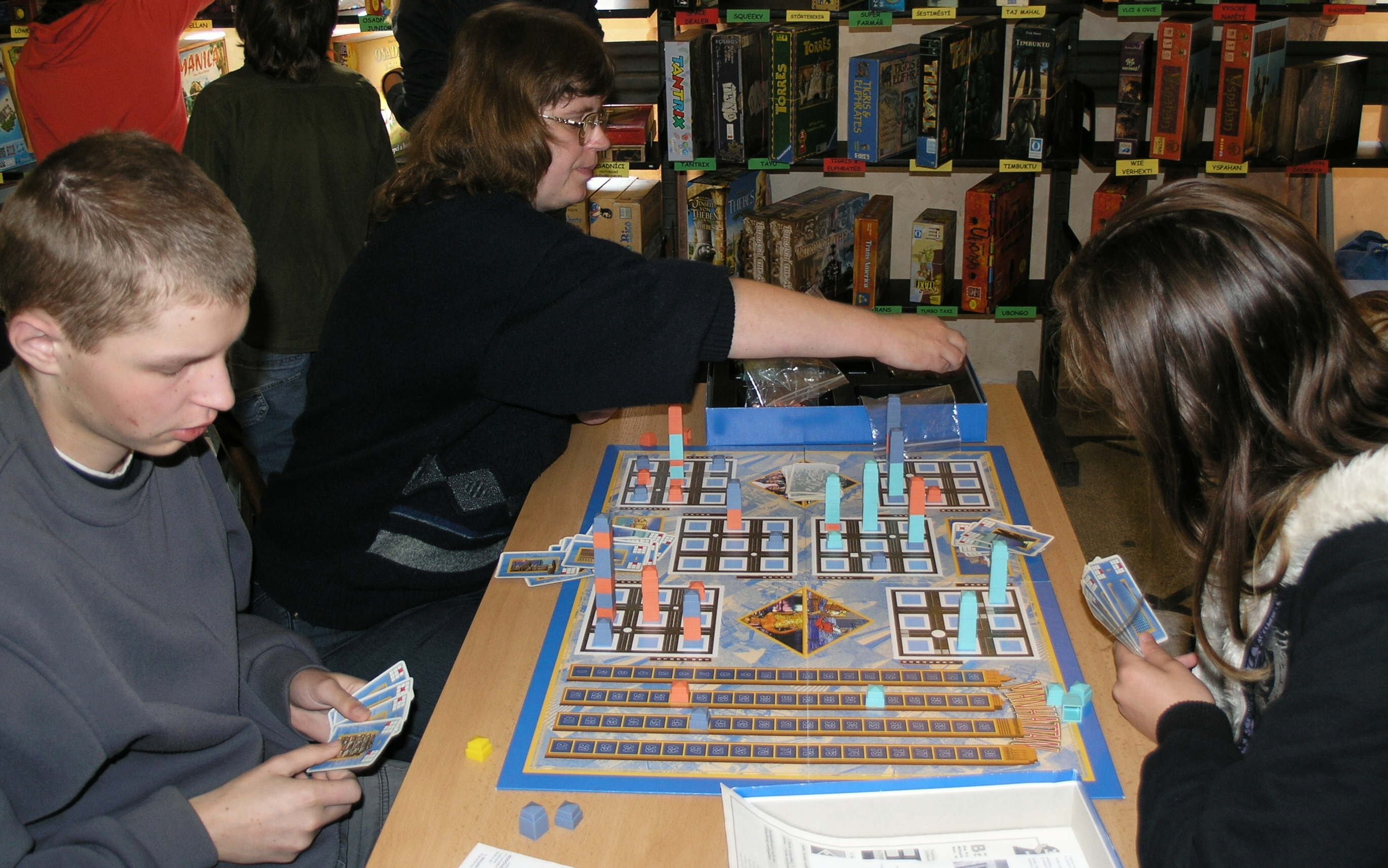
Manhattan

In Manhattan, players aim to construct skyscrapers from selecting their building cards, selecting a city on the game board and placing building pieces in spaces corresponding to it. Players may place on a building owned by them or on an empty space; however, placing it on a skyscraper controlled by another player requires the same number of floors of his/her colour compared to the player in control. Control is simply determined by which player has the top piece. After six pieces are placed, points are awarded for each skyscraper and also bonus points for the tallest skyscraper and most skyscraper in each city. The game ends after all twenty-four parts are placed.

== Reception ==
Manhattan received generally positive reviews. It was the winner of Spiel des Jahres in 1994, with the jury describing it as "original and highly stimulating", praising the game's engagement, accessibility, and interaction; despite some contemporary reviews being mixed. However, Board Game Quest gave a mixed review and awarded the game three out of five stars. The accessibility and mechanics of the game were praised, but it was also criticised its lack of complexity, dated design, and limited appeal for two players. A review from Lautapeliopas described the gameplay as decent, but was critical of the components and scalability. Multiple reviewers commented on Manhattan from The Opinionated Gamers and had varying conclusions. The reviewer Chris Wray praised on its accessibility, originality and complexity, whereas other reviewers criticised its appeal with gamers and dated gameplay, stating that it was "abstract, chaotic, and luck-driven".

== Reviews ==
- Casus Belli #88
