= World Puzzle Championship =

Annual international puzzle competition

The World Puzzle Championship (commonly abbreviated as WPC) is an annual international puzzle competition run by the World Puzzle Federation. All the puzzles in the competition are pure-logic problems based on simple principles, designed to be playable regardless of language or culture.

National teams are determined by local affiliates of the World Puzzle Federation. Of the 30 championships (team category) held thus far, 17 have been won by the United States, 8 by Germany, and 3 each by the Czech Republic and Japan. The most successful individual contestant is Ulrich Voigt (Germany) with 11 grand champion titles since 2000.

== Origin ==
The World Puzzle Championship was the brainchild of Will Shortz, who wanted to create an event where puzzlers from different countries could compete on an even playing field. Previously, the International Crossword Marathon was the major international competition for puzzle-solving, and Will Shortz had attended it every year, but because participants used their own language and crossword rules, it was not a very good basis for comparing raw puzzle-solving skills across cultures. Shortz created the WPC to overcome these flaws. As described by Nick Baxter, co-director of the U.S. Puzzle Championship, the challenge of the competition is speed.

The first WPC was held in New York City in 1992, and Shortz was the organizer and Helene Hovanec was the coordinator. Each WPC has been held at a different city since then.

== Participants ==
Currently, 34 countries are official members of the World Puzzle Federation. Individuals may also take part if their country is not already represented by a national team. In the 2017 WPC, 169 contestants from 27 countries participated. The United States has won the championship 17 times, followed by Germany with 8 championships. The Czech Republic and Japan has each won three times. Ulrich Voigt of Germany has been the most successful individual contestant, winning the gold medal eleven times since 2000. Wei-Hwa Huang of the United States won four of the first eight championships in the 1990s. Ken Endo of Japan won five of the most recent eight championships.

== Results summary ==
	Host city		Individual			Team			
Year	City	Country	Gold	Silver	Bronze	Gold	Silver	Bronze	Ref.
1992	New York City	United States	(Canada) David Samuel	(Canada) Darren Rigby	(United States) Daniel Johnson	United States	Argentina	Poland	
1993	Brno	Czech Republic	(Czech Republic) Robert Babilon	(United States) Wei-Hwa Huang	(Czech Republic) Pavel Kalhous	Czech Republic	United States	Canada	
1994	Cologne	Germany	(United States) Ron Osher	(Czech Republic) Pavel Kalhous	(Croatia) Pero Galogaza	Czech Republic	United States	Croatia	
1995	Poiana Brasov	Romania	(United States) Wei-Hwa Huang	(Hungary) Gyorgy Istvan	(Czech Republic) Pavel Kalhous	United States	Czech Republic	Hungary	
1996	Utrecht	Netherlands	(Czech Republic) Robert Babilon	(United States) Zack Butler	(United States) Wei-Hwa Huang	United States	Czech Republic	Turkey	
1997	Koprivnica	Croatia	(United States) Wei-Hwa Huang	(United States) Ron Osher	(Czech Republic) Robert Babilon	Czech Republic	United States	Hungary	
1998	Istanbul	Turkey	(United States) Wei-Hwa Huang	(Japan) Akira Nakai	(United States) Zack Butler	United States	Japan	Hungary	
1999	Budapest	Hungary	(United States) Wei-Hwa Huang	(United States) Zack Butler	(Netherlands) Niels Roest	United States	Netherlands	Czech Republic	
2000	Stamford	United States	(Germany) Ulrich Voigt	(United States) Wei-Hwa Huang	(Netherlands) Niels Roest	United States	Netherlands	Germany	
2001	Brno	Czech Republic	(Germany) Ulrich Voigt	(Czech Republic) Robert Babilon	(United States) Zack Butler	United States	Czech Republic	Belgium	
2002	Oulu	Finland	(Netherlands) Niels Roest	(Germany) Roland Voigt	(Germany) Ulrich Voigt	Japan	Germany	United States	
2003	Arnhem	Netherlands	(Germany) Ulrich Voigt	(United States) Wei-Hwa Huang	(United States) Roger Barkan	Germany	United States	Netherlands	
2004	Opatija	Croatia	(Netherlands) Niels Roest	(Germany) Ulrich Voigt	(United States) Roger Barkan	United States	Germany	Hungary	
2005	Eger	Hungary	(Germany) Ulrich Voigt	(United States) Wei-Hwa Huang	(Netherlands) Niels Roest	Germany	United States	Japan	
2006	Borovets	Bulgaria	(Germany) Ulrich Voigt	(United States) Wei-Hwa Huang	(Japan) Maho Yokota	United States	Germany	Japan	
2007	Rio de Janeiro	Brazil	(Hungary) Pal Madarassy	(United States) Thomas Snyder	(Germany) Ulrich Voigt	United States	Japan	Belgium	
2008	Minsk	Belarus	(Germany) Ulrich Voigt	(Turkey) Mehmet Murat Sevim	(United States) Roger Barkan	United States	Japan	Czech Republic	
2009	Antalya	Turkey	(Germany) Ulrich Voigt	(Slovakia) Peter Hudák	(Turkey) Mehmet Murat Sevim	Germany	United States	Japan	
2010	Paprotnia	Poland	(Japan) Taro Arimatsu	(Germany) Ulrich Voigt	(Japan) Hideaki Jo	United States	Japan	Germany	
2011	Eger	Hungary	(United States) Palmer Mebane	(Germany) Ulrich Voigt	(United States) Thomas Snyder	United States	Germany	Japan	
2012	Kraljevica	Croatia	(Germany) Ulrich Voigt	(United States) Thomas Snyder	(United States) Palmer Mebane	Germany	Japan	United States	
2013	Beijing	China	(Germany) Ulrich Voigt	(United States) Palmer Mebane	(United States) Thomas Snyder	United States	Germany	Japan	
2014	London	United Kingdom	(Germany) Ulrich Voigt	(United States) Palmer Mebane	(Germany) Florian Kirch	Germany	Japan	United States	
2015	Sofia	Bulgaria	(Japan) Ken Endo	(Germany) Ulrich Voigt	(United States) Palmer Mebane	Germany	Japan	United States	
2016	Senec	Slovakia	(Germany) Ulrich Voigt	(United States) Palmer Mebane	(Japan) Ken Endo	Germany	Japan	United States	
2017	Bangalore	India	(Japan) Ken Endo	(Germany) Ulrich Voigt	(Japan) Kota Morinishi	Japan	United States	Germany	
2018	Prague	Czech Republic	(United States) Thomas Snyder	(Germany) Ulrich Voigt	(Japan) Ken Endo	Germany	United States	Hungary	
2019	Kirchheim	Germany	(Germany) Philipp Weiß	(Japan) Ken Endo	(United States) Walker Anderson	United States	Germany	Japan	
2020	Shanghai	China	cancelled due to the COVID-19 pandemic						
2021	Shanghai	China	cancelled due to the COVID-19 pandemic						
2022	Kraków	Poland	(Japan) Ken Endo	(India) Prasanna Seshadri	(United States) Thomas Luo	Japan	United States	Germany	
2023	Toronto	Canada	(Japan) Ken Endo	(United States) Walker Anderson	(United States) Thomas Luo	United States	Germany	Japan	
2024	Beijing	China	(Japan) Ken Endo	(Japan) Kota Morinishi	(Germany) König Christian	Japan	United States	China	
2025	Eger	Hungary	(United Kingdom) Freddie Hand	(Japan) Ken Endo	(United States) Walker Anderson	United States	Japan	Germany	

=== Age-restricted categories ===
Starting from 2013, titles have been awarded also for the best players in two age categories, Under 18 and Over 50 years of age.

	Location		Under 18			Over 50			
Year	City	Country	Gold	Silver	Bronze	Gold	Silver	Bronze	Ref.
2013	Beijing	China	(China) Qiu Yanzhe	(Slovakia) Jakub Bahyl	(Slovakia) Zuzana Hromcová	(Italy) Stefano Forcolin	(United States) Nick Baxter	(Finland) Jouni Juhani Särkijärvi	
2014	London	United Kingdom	(China) Qiu Yanzhe	(France) Olivier Garçonnet	(Turkey) Mehmet Durmuş	(Italy) Stefano Forcolin	(Czech Republic) Jiří Hrdina	(United States) Nick Baxter	
2015	Sofia	Bulgaria	(China) Qiu Yanzhe	(France) Olivier Garçonnet	(Slovakia) Pavol Kollár	(United Kingdom) David McNeill	(Italy) Stefano Forcolin	(Serbia) Zoran Tanasić	
2016	Senec	Slovakia	(China) Qiu Yanzhe	(Slovakia) Pavol Kollár	(France) Olivier Garçonnet	(Japan) Taro Arimatsu	(Italy) Stefano Forcolin	(Hungary) Miklós Mócsy	
2017	Bangalore	India	(United States) Walker Anderson	(Slovakia) Pavol Kollár	(South Korea) Kang Hyunmo	(Japan) Taro Arimatsu	(United Kingdom) David McNeill	(Germany) Michael Smit	
2018	Prague	Czech Republic	(United States) Walker Anderson	(China) Tantan Dai	(Bulgaria) Ivan Georgiev	(Japan) Taro Arimatsu	(Serbia) Cedomir Milanovic	(Germany) Michael Smit	
2019	Kirchheim	Germany	(United States) Walker Anderson	(Japan) Ryotaro Chiba	(Hungary) Péter Gyimesi	(Japan) Taro Arimatsu	(United Kingdom) David McNeill	(Serbia) Cedomir Milanovic	
2020	Shanghai	China	cancelled due to the COVID-19 pandemic						
2021	Shanghai	China	cancelled due to the COVID-19 pandemic						
2022	Kraków	Poland	(India) Nityant Agriwal	(South Korea) Yoon Geonwoo	(Turkey) Ahmet Eren Gozubenli	(Japan) Taro Arimatsu	(Bulgaria) Deyan Razsadov	(Serbia) Cedomir Milanovic	
2023	Toronto	Canada	(China) Qiu Suzhe	(France) Valentin Miakinen	(Poland) Maciej Ignaciuk	(Bulgaria) Deyan Razsadov	(Luxembourg) Claudine Thiry	(France) Philippe Meyer	
2024	Beijing	China	(China) Qiu Suzhe	(Mongolia) Oyun-Erdene Adiyajav	(China) Huang Zhenyu	(Bulgaria) Deyan Razsadov	(Luxembourg) Claudine Thiry	(France) Philippe Meyer	
2025	Eger	Hungary	(China) Qiu Suzhe	(Turkey) Ramazan Fıstıkcı	(Mongolia) Oyun-Erdene Adiyajav	(United States) Wei-Hwa Huang	(Czech Republic) Jana Vodičková	(Bulgaria) Deyan Razsadov	

== Classic puzzles used ==
9th World Puzzle Championship balloon balance puzzle

Incomplete list, in alphabetical order:

- Battleship
- Fillomino
- Hitori
- Kakuro
- Nonogram
- Numberlink
- Rubik's Cube
- Slitherlink
- Sudoku and many variants

== See also ==
- World Sudoku Championship, another competition run by the World Puzzle Federation
- Nob Yoshigahara Puzzle Design Competition, a competition for the engineering and design of mechanical puzzles
