= World Sudoku Championship =

Annual international sudoku competition

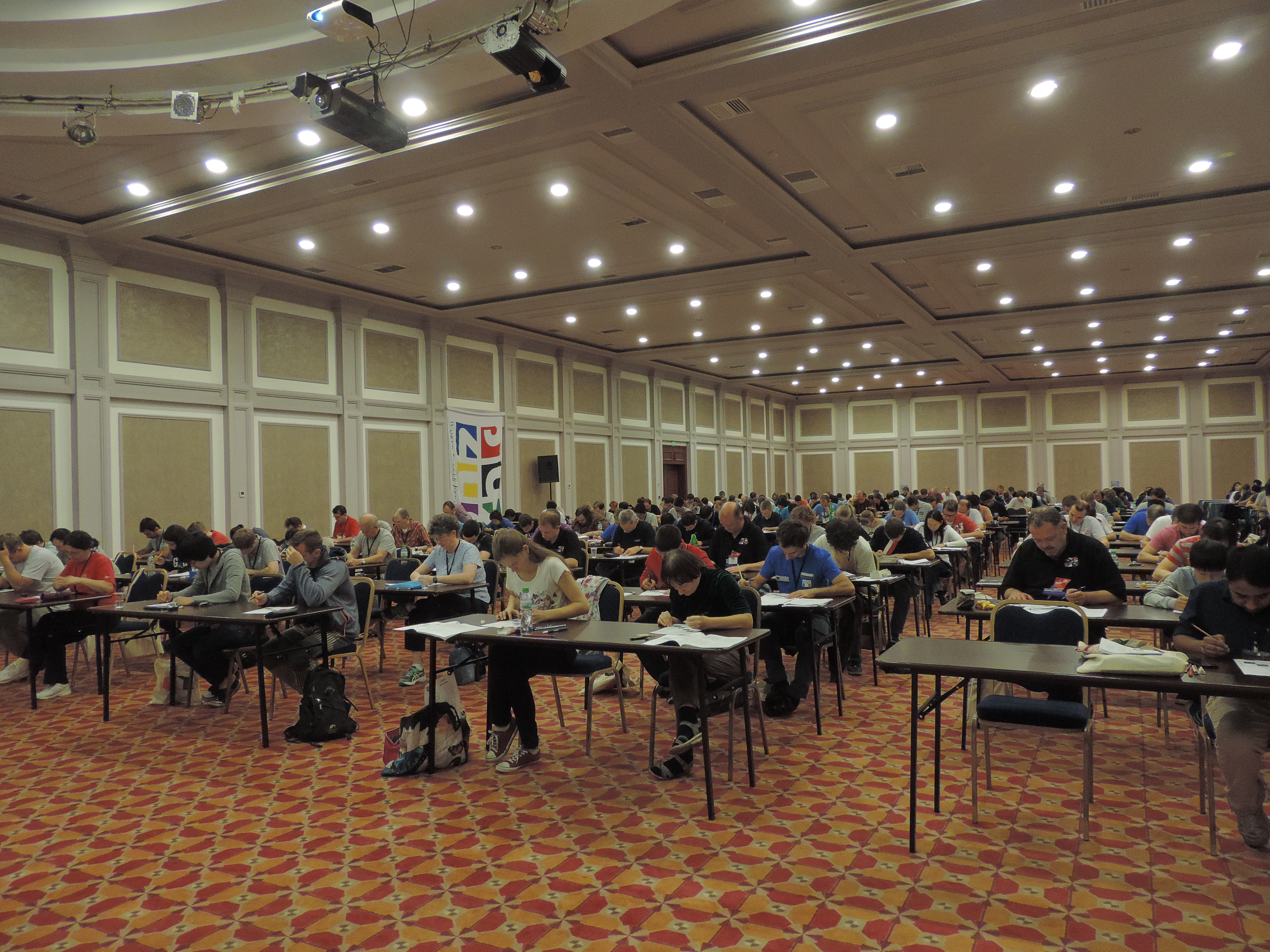
2015 World Sudoku Championship Sofia, Bulgaria

The World Sudoku Championship (WSC) is an annual international puzzle competition organised by a national member of the World Puzzle Federation. The first event was held in Lucca, Italy, in 2006. National teams are determined by local affiliates of the World Puzzle Federation. The competition typically consists of 100 or more puzzles solved by all competitors over multiple timed rounds, including classic sudoku, variations and other puzzle types, normally followed by a playoff for the top qualifiers to determine a champion. Examples of rounds include the Relay round, where an answer from one puzzle contributes digits to the start of the next sudoku, and the "World Record" round, in which solvers competed to set a Guinness World Record for fastest sudoku solution.

Kota Morinishi of Japan (2014, 2015, 2017, 2018) has been the most successful winner in the history of the event with four individual titles, over Thomas Snyder of United States (2007, 2008 and 2011) and Jan Mrozowski of Poland (2009, 2010 and 2012) who have each won three.

Since 2007 there has also been a team competition. Japan has been the most successful team, having won the title six times (in 2007, 2012, 2014, 2015, 2018, and 2023); China (2013, 2017, 2019, 2024 and 2025) won the title 5 times, where Czech Republic (2008, 2016, 2022) won the title three times.

Starting from 2011, the event has been held alongside the World Puzzle Championship series, which is also organised by the World Puzzle Federation.

== Participants ==
Currently, 30 countries are official members of the World Puzzle Federation. Individuals may also take part if their country is not already represented by a national team.

The 2025 World Sudoku Championship took place in Eger, Hungary.

The 2026 World Sudoku Championship is scheduled to take place in Kolkata, India.

== Results summary ==
Year	Host city	Host nation	Individual			Team		
Year	Host city	Host nation	Gold	Silver	Bronze	Gold	Silver	Bronze
2026	Kolkata	India						
2025	Eger	Hungary	(China) Dai Tantan	(Japan) Kota Morinishi	(China) Hu Yuxuan	China	Japan	Czech Republic
2024	Beijing	China	(China) Ming Letian	(China) Dai Tantan	(China) Hu Yuxuan	China	Japan	United States
2023	Toronto	Canada	(China) Dai Tantan	(Estonia) Tiit Vunk	(Japan) Kota Morinishi	Japan	Czech Republic	United States
2022	Kraków	Poland	(Estonia) Tiit Vunk	(China) Dai Tantan	(Japan) Kota Morinishi	Czech Republic	Japan	Estonia
2021	Shanghai	China	Cancelled due to the COVID-19 pandemic					
2020	Shanghai	China	Cancelled due to the COVID-19 pandemic					
2019	Kirchheim	Germany	(Japan) Ken Endo	(Japan) Kota Morinishi	(China) Dai Tantan	China	Japan	Czech Republic
2018	Prague	Czech Republic	(Japan) Kota Morinishi	(France) Bastien Vial-Jaime	(Estonia) Tiit Vunk	Japan	China	Germany
2017	Bangalore	India	(Japan) Kota Morinishi	(Estonia) Tiit Vunk	(China) Qiu Yanzhe	China	Japan	France
2016	Senec	Slovakia	(Estonia) Tiit Vunk	(Czech Republic) Jakub Ondroušek	(Japan) Kota Morinishi	Czech Republic	China	Japan
2015	Sofia	Bulgaria	(Japan) Kota Morinishi	(Estonia) Tiit Vunk	(Czech Republic) Jakub Ondroušek	Japan	China	Czech Republic
2014	London	United Kingdom	(Japan) Kota Morinishi	(Estonia) Tiit Vunk	(France) Bastien Vial-Jaime (Czech Republic) Jakub Ondroušek	Japan	Germany	China
2013	Beijing	China	(China) Jin Ce	(Japan) Kota Morinishi	(Czech Republic) Jakub Ondroušek	China	Czech Republic	Japan
2012	Kraljevica	Croatia	(Poland) Jan Mrozowski	(Japan) Kota Morinishi	(Japan) Hideaki Jo	Japan	Czech Republic	China
2011	Eger	Hungary	(United States) Thomas Snyder	(Japan) Kota Morinishi	(Estonia) Tiit Vunk	Germany	Czech Republic	United States
2010	Philadelphia	United States	(Poland) Jan Mrozowski	(Czech Republic) Jakub Ondroušek	(Japan) Hideaki Jo	Germany	Czech Republic	Japan
2009	Žilina	Slovakia	(Poland) Jan Mrozowski	(Serbia) Branko Ceranic	(Czech Republic) Robert Babilon	Slovakia	Czech Republic	Serbia
2008	Goa	India	(United States) Thomas Snyder	(Japan) Yuhei Kusui	(Czech Republic) Jakub Ondroušek	Czech Republic	Japan	Germany
2007	Prague	Czech Republic	(United States) Thomas Snyder	(Japan) Yuhei Kusui	(Slovakia) Peter Hudák	Japan	United States	Czech Republic
2006	Lucca	Italy	(Czech Republic) Jana Tylova	(United States) Thomas Snyder	(United States) Wei-Hwa Huang	-	-	-

Starting from 2013, titles have been awarded also for the best players in two age groups, Under 18 and Over 50 years of age.

Year	Under 18			Over 50		
Year	Gold	Silver	Bronze	Gold	Silver	Bronze
2026						
2025	(China) Suzhe Qiu	(Turkey) Can Erturan	(United States) Nora Borst	(United Kingdom) David McNeill	(United States) Wei-Hwa Huang	(France) Philippe Meyer
2024	(China) Suzhe Qiu	(Turkey) Can Erturan	(China) Yang Leduo	(France) Philippe Meyer	(Bulgaria) Svetlozar Stefanov	(Luxembourg) Claudine Thiry
2023	(China) Suzhe Qiu	(Turkey) Can Erturan	(Croatia) Tina Bratim	(United Kingdom) Mark Goodliffe	(France) Philippe Meyer	(Italy) Laura Tarchetti
2022	(India) Nityant Agarwal	(Turkey) Can Erturan	(Italy) Valerio Stancanelli	(United Kingdom) Mark Goodliffe	(Japan) Taro Arimatsu	(France) Philippe Meyer
2021	Cancelled due to the COVID-19 pandemic					
2020	Cancelled due to the COVID-19 pandemic					
2019	(China) Ming Letian	(China) Hu Yuxuan	(China) Huang Mingrui	(United Kingdom) David McNeill	(Serbia) Zoran Tanasic	(United States) Joshua Zucker
2018	(China) Ming Letian	(China) Dai Tantan	(China) Chen Shiyu	(Germany) Michael Smit	(United Kingdom) Mark Goodliffe	(Japan) Taro Arimatsu
2017	(China) Dai Tantan	(China) Hu Yuxuan	(China) Ming Letian	(United Kingdom) David McNeill	(United Kingdom) Mark Goodliffe	(Germany) Michael Smit
2016	(China) Qiu Yanzhe	(China) Chen Shiyu	(China) Sun Cheran	(Serbia) Zoran Tanasic	(United Kingdom) Mark Goodliffe	(Japan) Taro Arimatsu
2015	(China) Sun Cheran	(China) Dai Tantan	(China) Chen Nuo	(United Kingdom) David McNeill	(United Kingdom) Mark Goodliffe	(Serbia) Zoran Tanasic
2014	(China) Dai Tantan	(China) Jin Ce	(China) Sun Cheran	(United Kingdom) David McNeill	(Czech Republic) Jiri Hrdina	(Italy) Stefano Forcolin
2013	(China) Jin Ce	(China) Sun Cheran	(China) Qiu Yanzhe	(Denmark) Henning Kalsgaard Poulsen	(China) Liang Yue	(Italy) Stefano Forcolin

== See also ==
- List of world championships in mind sports
