= Spiel des Jahres =

German award for board games and card games

Spiel des Jahres e.V.
- Formation: 1978
- Founded at: Nuremberg, Germany
- Type: Association
- Chairman: Harald Schrapers
- General Manager: Guido Heinecke
- Website: spiel-des-jahres.de/en

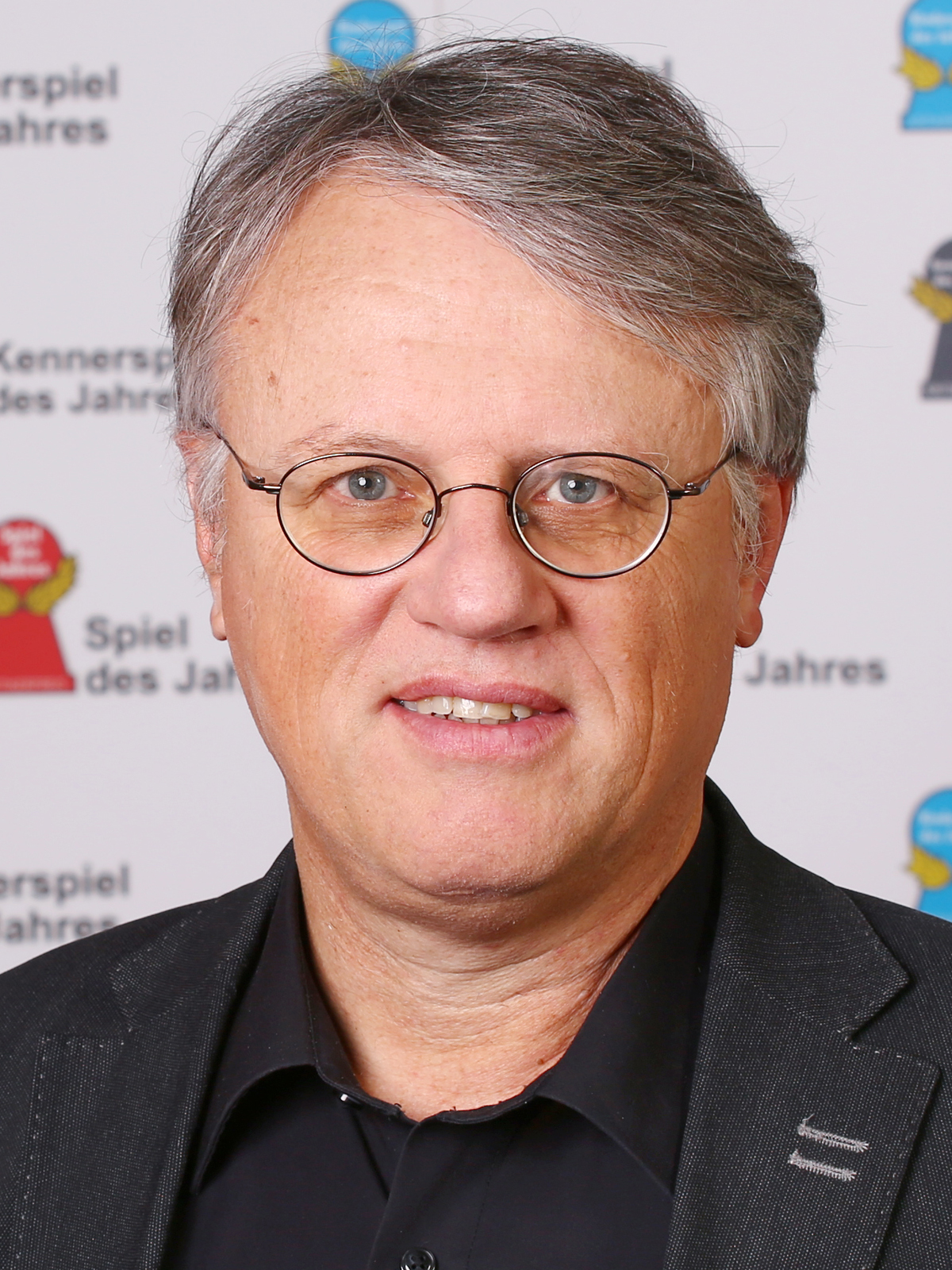
Harald Schrapers, Chairman of the Jury of the Spiel des Jahres

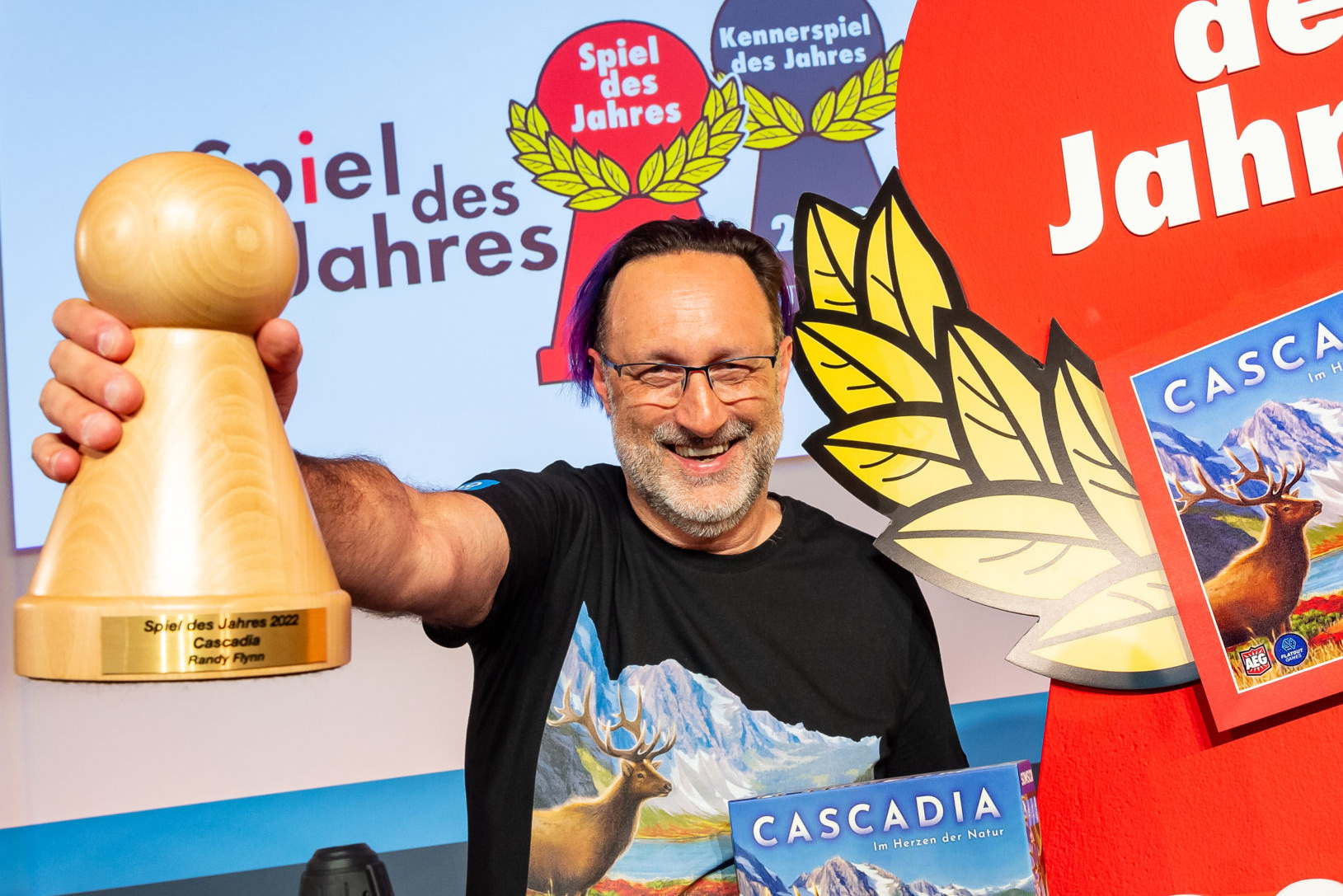
Randy Flynn’s Cascadia: Winner of Spiel des Jahres 2022

The Spiel des Jahres (German: [ˈʃpiːl dəs ˈjaːʁəs], "Game of the Year") is an award for board and card games, created in 1978 with the purpose of rewarding family-friendly game design and promoting excellent games in the German market. It is thought that the existence and popularity of the award was one of the major drivers of the quality of games coming out of Germany, particularly in the 1980s and 1990s. A Spiel des Jahres nomination can increase the typical sales of a game from 500–3,000 copies to around 10,000, and the winner can usually expect to sell as many as 500,000 copies. As Germany is considered the biggest for Board Games worldwide, being awarded 'Spiel des Jahres' has a tremendous impact for the success of any game.

== Award criteria ==
The award is given by a jury of German-speaking board game critics from Germany, Austria, and Switzerland, who review games released in Germany in the preceding twelve months. The games considered for the award are family-style games. War games, role-playing games, collectible card games, and other complicated, highly competitive, or hobbyist games are outside the scope of the award. Since 1989, there has been a separate award for children's games. The jury is not subject to public scrutiny and members of the public are not offered the opportunity to influence the voting.

On occasion, the jury has awarded a special prize for more complex games, such as Agricola in 2008 or World Without End in 2010. Prior to 2011, this award was an exceptional award which was not necessarily awarded annually. In 2011, however, this practice was formalized when the jury created a new category for more complex games called Kennerspiel des Jahres. Along with the nominations, the jury also gives a list of recommended games, and occasionally gives out special prizes for games which will not be considered for the main award. The criteria on which a game is evaluated are:

1. game concept (originality, playability, game value)
2. rule structure (composition, clearness, comprehensibility)
3. layout (box, board, rules),
4. design (functionality, workmanship)

The jury does not release its scoring system or provide insight into how the categories are weighted.

== Awards and nominees ==
=== 1979 awards ===
The games receiving recognition at the 1979 awards were:

Game of the Year
Game	Designer	Publisher	Result
Hare and Tortoise	David Parlett	Rio Grande Games	Won

Special Award
Game	Designer(s)	Publisher	Category
Seti	Andreas Steiner and Hartmut Witt	Hexagames	Beautiful Game

=== 1980 awards ===
The games receiving recognition at the 1980 awards were:

Game of the Year
Game	Designer	Publisher	Result
Rummikub	Ephraim Hertzano	Pressman Toy Corp.	Won

Special Award
Game	Designer	Publisher	Category
Spiel	Reinhold Wittig	ABC Toys	Beautiful Game
Rubik's Cube	Erno Rubik	Ideal Toy Corp	Best Solitaire Game

=== 1981 awards ===
The games receiving recognition at the 1981 awards were:

Game of the Year
Game	Designer	Publisher	Result
Focus	Sid Sackson	Whitman	Won

Special Award
Game	Designer	Publisher	Category
Ra: Strategy Among Hexagons	Marco Donadoni	International Team	Beautiful Game

=== 1982 awards ===
The games receiving recognition at the 1982 awards were:

Game of the Year
Game	Designer	Publisher	Result
Enchanted Forest	Alex Randolph and Michael Matschoss	Ravensburger	Won

Special Award
Game	Designer	Publisher	Category
Skript	Henri Sala	Jumbo	Beautiful Game

=== 1983 awards ===
The games receiving recognition at the 1983 awards were:

Game of the Year
Game	Designer	Publisher	Result
Scotland Yard	Manfred Burggraf and others	Ravensburger	Won

Special Award
Game	Designer	Publisher	Category
Wir füttern die kleinen Nilpferde	Reinhold Wittig	Fagus	Beautiful Game

=== 1984 awards ===
The games receiving recognition at the 1984 awards were:

Game of the Year
Game	Designer	Publisher	Result
Railway Rivals	David Watts	Games Workshop	Won

Special Award
Game	Designer	Publisher	Result
Uisge	Roland Siegers	Hexagames	Won

=== 1985 awards ===
The games receiving recognition at the 1985 awards were:

Game of the Year
Game	Designer	Publisher	Result
Sherlock Holmes: Consulting Detective	Raymond Edwards, Suzanne Goldberg and Gary Grady	Space Cowboys	Won

Special Award
Game	Designer	Publisher	Category
Die Magier	Johann Rüttinger	Noris Spiele	Beautiful Game

=== 1998 awards ===
The games receiving recognition at the 1998 awards were:

Game of the Year
Game	Designer	Publisher	Result	Ref.
Elfenland	Alan R. Moon	Amigo	Won	

Special Award
Game	Designer	Publisher	Category	Result	Ref.
Zicke Zacke Hühnerkacke (Chicken Cha Cha Cha)	Klaus Zoch	Zoch Verlag	Children's Game of the Year	Won	

=== 1999 awards ===
The games receiving recognition at the 1999 awards were:

Game of the Year
Game	Designer	Publisher	Result	Ref.
Tikal	Wolfgang Kramer and Michael Kiesling	Ravensburger	Won	
Giganten	Wilko Manz	Kosmos	Nominated	
Union Pacific	Alan R. Moon	Amigo	Nominated	

Special Award
Game	Designer	Publisher	Category	Result	Ref.
Kayanak	Peter-Paul Joopen	HABA and Nabita World	Children's Game of the Year	Won	

=== 2000 awards ===
Game of the Year
Game	Designer	Publisher	Result
Torres	Wolfgang Kramer and Michael Kiesling	F.X. Schmid	Won
Carolus Magnus	Leo Colovini	Rio Grande Games	Nominated
Ohne Furcht und Adel (Citadels)	Bruno Faidutti	Hans im Glück	Nominated

Special Award
Game	Designer	Publisher	Category	Result
Arbos	Armin Müller, Martin Arnold	M+A Spiele	Children's Game of the Year	Won

=== 2001 awards ===
This was the first year the Children's Game of the Year award was given, an award for more simple games:

Game of the Year
Game	Designer	Publisher	Result
Carcassonne	Klaus-Jürgen Wrede	Hans im Glück	Won
Das Amulett	Alan R. Moon and Aaron Weissblum	Goldsieber Spiele	Nominated
Zapp Zerapp	Heinz Meister and Klaus Zoch	Zoch Verlag	Nominated

Children's Game of the Year
Game	Designer	Publisher	Result
Klondike	Stefanie Rohner, Christian Wolf	HABA	Won
Rüsselbande (The Piggyback Brigade)	Alex Randolph	Drei Magier	Nominated
Im Märchenwald	Markus Nikisch	Adlung Spiele	Nominated

Special Award
Game	Designer	Publisher	Category	Result
Troia	Thomas Fackler	Zeitstein Spiele	Historical Game	Won
Der Herr der Ringe (Lord of the Rings)	Reiner Knizia	Kosmos	Literary Game	Won

=== 2002 awards ===
Game of the Year
Game	Designer	Publisher	Result
Villa Paletti	Bill Payne	Zoch Verlag	Won
Puerto Rico	Andreas Seyfarth	Alea	Nominated
TransAmerica	Franz-Benno Delonge	Winning Moves Germany	Nominated

Children's Game of the Year
Game	Designer	Publisher	Result
Maskenball der Käfer	Peter-Paul Joopen	Selecta	Won
Höchst verdächtig (Highly Suspect)	Manfred Ludwig	HABA	Nominated
Bärenstark	Heinz Meister	Goldsieber Spiele	Nominated

=== 2003 awards ===
Game of the Year
Game	Designer	Publisher	Result
Der Palast von Alhambra (Alhambra)	Dirk Henn	Queen Games	Won
Clans	Leo Colovini	Venice Connection	Nominated
Die Dracheninsel	Tom Schoeps	Amigo	Nominated

Children's Game of the Year
Game	Designer	Publisher	Result
Viva Topo!	Manfred Ludwig	Selecta	Won
Robbys Rutschpartie	Wolfgang Kramer, Jürgen P.K. Grunau, Hans Raggan	Kosmos	Nominated
Lauras Sternenspiel	Kai Haferkamp, Rüdiger Husmeier	Amigo	Nominated

=== 2004 awards ===
Game of the Year
Game	Designer	Publisher	Result
Zug um Zug (Ticket to Ride)	Alan R. Moon	Days of Wonder	Won
Dicke Luft in der Gruft (Dawn Under)	Norbert Proena	Zoch Verlag	Nominated
Ingenious	Reiner Knizia	Kosmos	Nominated
Raja: Palastbau in Indien (Maharaja: The Game of Palace Building in India)	Wolfgang Kramer and Michael Kiesling	Phalanx Games	Nominated
Sankt Petersburg (Saint Petersburg)	Michael Tummelhofer	Hans im Glück	Nominated

Children's Game of the Year
Game	Designer	Publisher	Result
Geistertreppe (Spooky Stairs)	Michelle Schanen	Drei Magier	Won
Schnelle Welle (Treasure Hunt)	Dirk Hanneforth, Hajo Bücken	Ravensburger	Nominated
Schatz der Drachen	Reiner Knizia	Winning Moves	Nominated
Mare Polare	Roberto Fraga	Selecta	Nominated
Macius: Achtung, fertig los!	Wolfgang Kramer, Jürgen P.K. Grunau, Hans Raggan	Kosmos	Nominated

=== 2005 awards ===
The nominations for the 2005 award were announced on May 8, 2005, and the winner on June 27, 2005:

Game of the Year
Game	Designer	Publisher	Result
Niagara	Thomas Liesching	Zoch Verlag	Won
Verflixxt! (That's Life!)	Wolfgang Kramer and Michael Kiesling	Ravensburger	Nominated
In 80 Tagen um die Welt (Around the World in 80 Days)	Michael Rieneck	Kosmos	Nominated
Jambo	Rüdiger Dorn	Kosmos	Nominated
Himalaya	Régis Bonnessée	Tilsit	Nominated

Children's Game of the Year
Game	Designer	Publisher	Result
Das kleine Gespenst	Kai Haferkamp	Kosmos	Won
Schildkrötenrennen (Ribbit)	Reiner Knizia	Winning Moves	Nominated
Schildi Schildkröte	Ronald Hofstätter	HABA	Nominated
Mago Magino	Reiner Knizia	Selecta	Nominated
Daddy Cool	Heinz Meister	Huch!	Nominated

=== 2006 awards ===
The nominations for the 2006 award were announced on May 28, 2006, and the winner on July 17, 2006:

Game of the Year
Game	Designer	Publisher	Result
Thurn and Taxis	Karen & Andreas Seyfarth	Hans im Glück	Won
Seeräuber (Buccaneer)	Stefan Dorra	Queen Games	Nominated
Aqua Romana	Martin Schlegel	Queen Games	Nominated
Just 4 Fun	Jürgen P.K. Grunau	Kosmos	Nominated
Blue Moon City	Reiner Knizia	Kosmos	Nominated

Children's Game of the Year
Game	Designer	Publisher	Result
Der schwarze Pirat	Guido Hoffmann	HABA	Won
Piratissimo	Manfred Ludwig	Selecta	Nominated
Nacht der Magier	Kirsten Becker, Jens-Peter Schliemann	Drei Magier	Nominated
Los Mampfos	Maja Dorn, Rüdiger Dorn	Zoch Verlag	Nominated
Giro Galoppo	Jürgen P.K. Grunau	Selecta	Nominated

Along with the nominations, the jury also assigned two special prizes for games which it felt were too demanding to count as 'family style' games:

Special Prizes
Game	Designer	Publisher	Category	Result
Schatten über Camelot (Shadows over Camelot)	Serge Laget and Bruno Cathala	Days of Wonder	Fantasy Game	Won
Caylus	William Attia	Ẏstari Games	Complex Game	Won

=== 2007 awards ===
The nominations for the 2007 award were announced on May 20, 2007, and the winner on June 25, 2007:

Game of the Year
Game	Designer	Publisher	Result
Zooloretto	Michael Schacht	Abacus Spiele	Won
Der Dieb von Bagdad (The Thief of Baghdad)	Thorsten Gimmler	Queen Games	Nominated
Jenseits von Theben (Thebes)	Peter Prinz	Queen Games	Nominated
Die Baumeister von Arkadia (Arkadia)	Rüdiger Dorn	Ravensburger	Nominated
Yspahan	Sébastien Pauchon	Ẏstari Games	Nominated

Children's Game of the Year
Game	Designer	Publisher	Result
Beppo der Bock	Peter Schackert, Klaus Zoch	Oberschwäbische Magnetspiele	Won
Rettet den Märchenschatz! (Save the Treasure of Fairy Tales)	Kai Haferkamp	Selecta	Nominated
Hüpf hüpf, Hurra! (Hop Hop Hooray!)	Heinz Meister	Ravensburger	Nominated
Gesagt – getan!	Roberto Fraga	HABA	Nominated
Burg-Ritter (Castle Knights)	Christian Tiggemann	HABA	Nominated

=== 2008 awards ===
The nominations for the 2008 award were announced on May 25, 2008, and the winner on June 30, 2008:

Game of the Year
Game	Designer	Publisher	Result
Keltis	Reiner Knizia	Kosmos	Won
Stone Age	Michael Tummelhofer	Hans im Glück	Nominated
Wie verhext! (Witch's Brew)	Andreas Pelikan	Alea/Ravensburger	Nominated
Blox	Wolfgang Kramer, Jürgen P.K. Grunau, Hans Raggan	Ravensburger	Nominated
Suleika	Dominique Ehrhard	Zoch Verlag	Nominated

Children's Game of the Year
Game	Designer	Publisher	Result
Wer war's? (Whoowasit?)	Reiner Knizia	Ravensburger	Won
Geisterjäger (Ghost Hunters)	Andreas, Ueli und Lukas Frei	HABA	Nominated
Fluss der Drachen	Inka and Markus Brand	Kosmos	Nominated
Didi Dotter	Ariel Laden	Zoch Verlag	Nominated
Capt'n Sharky: Abenteuer auf der Schatzinsel	Kai Haferkamp	Die Spiegelburg	Nominated

Special Prize
Game	Designer	Publisher	Category	Result
Agricola	Uwe Rosenberg	Lookout Games	Complex Game	Won

=== 2009 awards ===
The nominations for the 2009 award were announced on May 24, 2009 and the winner on June 29, 2009:

Game of the Year
Game	Designer	Publisher	Result
Dominion	Donald X. Vaccarino	Rio Grande Games	Won
FITS	Reiner Knizia	Ravensburger	Nominated
Finca	Ralf zur Linde, Wolfgang Sentker	Hans im Glück	Nominated
Fauna	Friedemann Friese	HUCH & Friends	Nominated
Pandemie (Pandemic)	Matt Leacock	Pegasus Spiele	Nominated

Children's Game of the Year
Game	Designer	Publisher	Result
Das magische Labyrinth (The Magic Labyrinth)	Dirk Baumann	Drei Magier	Won
Curli Kuller	Marco Teubner	Selecta	Nominated
Zoowaboo	Carlo A. Rossi	Selecta	Nominated
Nicht zu fassen (Hide the Kids!)	Fréderic Moyersoen	Zoch Verlag	Nominated
Land in Sicht (Tonga Island)	Stefan Dorra	Ravensburger	Nominated

Special Prizes
Game	Designer	Publisher	Category	Result
Gift Trap	Nick Kellet	Heidelberger Spieleverlag	Party Game	Won
Space Alert	Vlaada Chvátil	Heidelberger Spieleverlag	New Game Worlds	Won

=== 2010 awards ===
The nominations for the 2010 award were announced on May 31, 2010, and the winner on June 28, 2010:

Game of the Year
Game	Designer	Publisher	Result
Dixit	Jean-Louis Roubira	Libellud	Won
Identik	William P. Jacobson and Amanda A. Kohout	Asmodee	Nominated
A la Carte	Karl-Heinz Schmiel	Moskito/Heidelberger	Nominated
Im Wandel der Zeiten: Das Würfelspiel – Bronzezeit (Roll Through the Ages: The Bronze Age)	Matt Leacock	Pegasus Spiele	Nominated
Fresko (Fresco)	Marco Ruskowski and Marcel Süßelbeck	Queen Games	Nominated

Children's Game of the Year
Game	Designer	Publisher	Result
Diego Drachenzahn	Manfred Ludwig	HABA	Won
Panic Tower!	Andrew Lawson, Jack Lawson	Goliath	Nominated
Vampire der Nacht (Vampires of the Night)	Kirsten Becker, Jens-Peter Schliemann	Drei Magier	Nominated
Turi-Tour	Alessandro Zucchini	Selecta	Nominated
Kraken-Alarm	Oliver Igelhaut	Kosmos	Nominated

Special Prizes
Game	Designer	Publisher	Category	Result
Die Tore der Welt (World Without End)	Michael Rieneck, Stefan Stadler	Kosmos	Game of the Year Plus	Won

=== 2011 awards ===
The nominations for the 2011 awards were announced on May 23, 2011, and the winners on June 27, 2011. This was the first year the Connoisseur-gamer Game of the Year award was given, an award for more complex games:

Game of the Year
Game	Designer	Publisher	Result
Qwirkle	Susan McKinley Ross	Mindware Spiele	Won
Asara	Wolfgang Kramer and Michael Kiesling	Ravensburger	Nominated
Die verbotene Insel (Forbidden Island)	Matt Leacock	Schmidt Games	Nominated

Connoisseur-gamer Game of the Year
Game	Designer	Publisher	Result
7 Wonders	Antoine Bauza	Repos Production	Won
Strasbourg	Stefan Feld	Pegasus Spiele	Nominated
Lancaster	Matthias Cramer	Queen Games	Nominated

Children's Game of the Year
Game	Designer	Publisher	Result
Da ist der Wurm drin	Carmen Kleinert	Zoch Verlag	Won
Die kleinen Zauberlehrlinge (Magician's Kitchen)	Thomas Daum, Violetta Leitner	Drei Magier	Nominated
Monster-Falle (Monster Trap)	Inka and Markus Brand	Kosmos	Nominated

=== 2012 awards ===
The nominations for the 2012 awards were announced on May 21, 2012, and the winners on July 9, 2012:

Game of the Year
Game	Designer	Publisher	Result
Kingdom Builder	Donald X. Vaccarino	Queen Games	Won
Las Vegas	Rüdiger Dorn	Alea/Ravensburger	Nominated
Eselsbrücke	Stefan Dorra and Ralf zur Linde	Schmidt Spiele	Nominated

Connoisseur-gamer Game of the Year
Game	Designer	Publisher	Result
Village	Inka Brand and Markus Brand	Pegasus Spiele	Won
K2	Adam Kałuża	rebel.pl	Nominated
Targi	Andreas Steiger	Kosmos	Nominated

Children's Game of the Year
Game	Designer	Publisher	Result
Schnappt Hubi!	Steffen Bogen	Ravensburger	Won
Spinnengift und Krötenschleim	Klaus Teuber	Kosmos	Nominated
Die kleinen Drachenritter	Marco Teubner	HUCH! & friends	Nominated

=== 2013 awards ===
The nominations for the 2013 awards were announced on May 21, 2013, and the Spiel and Kennerspiel winners were announced on July 8, 2013. The Kinderspiel (Children's) Game of the Year was announced on June 12, 2013:

Game of the Year
Game	Designer	Publisher	Result
Hanabi	Antoine Bauza	Asmodée Éditions	Won
Augustus	Paolo Mori	Hurrican	Nominated
Qwixx	Steffan Benndorf	GameFactory	Nominated

Connoisseur-gamer Game of the Year
Game	Designer	Publisher	Result
Die Legenden von Andor (Legends of Andor)	Michael Menzel	Kosmos	Won
Brügge (Bruges)	Stefan Feld	Hans im Glück	Nominated
Die Paläste von Carrara (The Palaces of Carrara)	Michael Kiesling and Wolfgang Kramer	Hans im Glück	Nominated

Children's Game of the Year
Game	Designer	Publisher	Result
Der verzauberte Turm (The Enchanted Tower)	Inka and Markus Brand	Schmidt Games	Won
Gold am Orinoko	Bernhard Weber	HABA	Nominated
Mucca Pazza	Iris Rossbach	Zoch Verlag	Nominated

=== 2014 awards ===
The nominations for the 2014 awards were announced on May 19, 2014. The Children's Game of the Year was announced on June 23, and the Game of the Year and Connoisseur's Game of the Year were announced on July 14:

Game of the Year
Game	Designer	Publisher	Result
Camel Up	Steffen Bogen	Pegasus Spiele	Won
Concept	Gaëtan Beaujannot and Alain Rivollet	Repos Production	Nominated
Splendor	Marc André	Space Cowboys	Nominated

Connoisseur-gamer Game of the Year
Game	Designer	Publisher	Result
Istanbul	Rüdiger Dorn	Pegasus Spiele	Won
Rokoko (Rococo)	Matthias Cramer, Louis Malt and Stefan Malz	Eggertspiele	Nominated
Concordia	Mac Gerdts	PD-Verlag	Nominated

Children's Game of the Year
Game	Designer	Publisher	Result
Geister, Geister, Schatzsuchmeister! (Ghost Fightin' Treasure Hunters)	Brian Yu	Mattel Games	Won
Flizz & Miez	Klemens Franz, Hanno Girke, Dale Yu	Stadlbauer	Nominated
Richard Ritterschlag (Brandon the Brave)	Johannes Zirm	HABA	Nominated

=== 2015 awards ===
The nominations for the 2015 awards were announced on May 18, 2015. The Kinderspiel des Jahres winner were announced on Monday, June 8, 2015, and the Spiel and Kennerspiel winners were announced on Monday, July 6, 2015:

Game of the Year
Game	Designer	Publisher	Result
Colt Express	Christophe Raimbault	Ludonaute	Won
Machi Koro	Masao Suganuma	Kosmos	Nominated
The Game	Steffen Benndorf	Nürnberger Spielkarten Verlag	Nominated

Connoisseur-gamer Game of the Year
Game	Designer	Publisher	Result
Broom Service	Andreas Pelikan and Alexander Pfister	Ravensburger	Won
Elysium	Brett J. Gilbert and Matthew Dunstan	Space Cowboys	Nominated
Orléans	Reiner Stockhausen	dlp games	Nominated

Children's Game of the Year
Game	Designer	Publisher	Result
Spinderella	Roberto Fraga	Zoch Verlag	Won
Push a Monster	Wolfgang Dirscherl, Manfred Reindl	Queen Games	Nominated
Schatz-Rabatz	Karin Hetling	Noris-Spiele	Nominated

=== 2016 awards ===
The nominations for the 2016 awards were announced on May 23, 2016, and the winners on Monday July 18, 2016:

Game of the Year
Game	Designer	Publisher	Result
Codenames	Vladimír Chvátil	Czech Games Edition	Won
Imhotep	Phil Walker-Harding	Kosmos	Nominated
Karuba	Rüdiger Dorn	HABA	Nominated

Connoisseur-gamer Game of the Year
Game	Designer	Publisher	Result
Isle of Skye: Vom Häuptling zum König (Isle of Skye: From Chieftain to King)	Andreas Pelikan and Alexander Pfister	Lookout Games	Won
Pandemic Legacy - Season 1	Matt Leacock and Rob Daviau	Z-Man Games	Nominated
T.I.M.E Stories	Manuel Rozoy	Space Cowboys	Nominated

Children's Game of the Year
Game	Designer	Publisher	Result
Stone Age Junior (My First Stone Age)	Marco Teubner	Hans im Glück	Won
Mmm!	Reiner Knizia	Pegasus Spiele	Nominated
Leo muss zum Friseur (Leo Goes to the Barber)	Leo Colovini	Abacus Spiele	Nominated

=== 2017 awards ===
The nominations for the 2017 award were announced on May 22, 2017. The winner for Children's Game of the Year was announced on June 19, 2017. The winners for Game of the Year and Connoisseur-gamer Game of the Year were announced on July 17, 2017.

Game of the Year
Game	Designer	Publisher	Result
Kingdomino	Bruno Cathala	Pegasus Spiele	Won
Magic Maze	Kasper Lapp	Pegasus Spiele	Nominated
Wettlauf nach El Dorado (The Quest for El Dorado)	Reiner Knizia	Ravensburger	Nominated

Connoisseur-gamer Game of the Year
Game	Designer	Publisher	Result
EXIT: Das Spiel (Exit: The Game)	Inka Brand and Markus Brand	Kosmos	Won
Räuber der Nordsee (Raiders of the North Sea)	Shem Phillips	Schwerkraft (Oberhausen)	Nominated
Terraforming Mars	Jakob Fryxelius	Schwerkraft (Oberhausen)	Nominated

Children's Game of the Year
Game	Designer	Publisher	Result
ICECOOL	Brian Gomez	Amigo	Won
Captain Silver	Wolfgang Dirscherl and Manfred Reindl	Queen Games	Nominated
Der Mysteriöse Wald (The Mysterious Forest)	Carlo A. Rossi	Iello (Heillecourt)	Nominated

=== 2018 awards ===
The nominations and the special prize for the 2018 award were announced on May 14, 2018. The winner for Children's Game of the Year was announced on June 11, 2018. The winners for Game of the Year and Connoisseur-gamer Game of the Year were announced on July 23, 2018.

Game of the Year
Game	Designer	Publisher	Result
Azul	Michael Kiesling	Next Move/Plan B Games	Won
Luxor	Rüdiger Dorn	Queen Games	Nominated
The Mind	Wolfgang Warsch	Nürnberger-Spielkarten-Verlag	Nominated

Connoisseur-gamer Game of the Year
Game	Designer	Publisher	Result
Die Quacksalber von Quedlinburg (The Quacks of Quedlinburg)	Wolfgang Warsch	Schmidt Games	Won
Ganz Schön Clever	Wolfgang Warsch	Schmidt Games	Nominated
Heaven & Ale	Michael Kiesling and Andreas Schmidt	Eggertspiele	Nominated

Children's Game of the Year
Game	Designer	Publisher	Result
Funkelschatz (Dragon's Breath)	Lena und Günter Burkhardt	HABA	Won
Emojito!	Urtis Šulinskas	Huch! & friends	Nominated
Panic Mansion	Asger Harding Granerud and Daniel Skjold Pedersen	Blue Orange	Nominated

Special Prize
Game	Designer	Publisher	Category	Result
Pandemic Legacy: Season 2	Matt Leacock and Rob Daviau	Z-Man Games	Special Prize	Won

=== 2019 awards ===
The nominations for the 2019 award were announced on May 20, 2019. The winner for Children's Game of the Year was announced on June 24, 2019

Game of the Year
Game	Designer	Publisher	Result
Just One	Ludovic Roudy and Bruno Sautter	Repos Production	Won
L.A.M.A. (L.L.A.M.A.)	Reiner Knizia	Amigo	Nominated
Werwörter (Werewords)	Ted Alspach	Ravensburger	Nominated

Connoisseur-gamer Game of the Year
Game	Designer	Publisher	Result
Flügelschlag (Wingspan)	Elizabeth Hargrave	Stonemaier Games	Won
Carpe Diem	Stefan Feld	Alea/Ravensburger	Nominated
Detective: Ein Krimi-Brettspiel (Detective: A Modern Crime Board Game)	Ignacy Trzewiczek, Przemysław Rymer and Jakub Łapot	Portal Games and Pegasus Spiele	Nominated

Children's Game of the Year
Game	Designer	Publisher	Result
Tal der Wikinger (Valley of the Vikings)	Marie and Wilfried Fort	HABA	Won
Fabulantica	Marco Teubner	Pegasus Spiele	Nominated
Go Gecko Go!	Jürgen Adams	Zoch Verlag	Nominated

=== 2020 awards ===
The nominations for the 2020 award were announced on May 18, 2020. The award for Children's Game of the Year was announced on June 15, 2020. The winners were announced on July 20, 2020.

Game of the Year
Game	Designer	Publisher	Result
Pictures	Daniela and Christian Stöhr	PD-Verlag	Won
My City	Reiner Knizia	Kosmos	Nominated
Nova Luna	Uwe Rosenberg and Corné van Moorsel	Edition Spielwiese and Pegasus Spiele	Nominated

Connoisseur-gamer Game of the Year
Game	Designer	Publisher	Result
Die Crew: Reist gemeinsam zum 9. Planeten (The Crew: The Quest for Planet Nine)	Thomas Sing	Kosmos	Won
Der Kartograph (Cartographers)	Jordy Adan	Pegasus Spiele	Nominated
The King's Dilemma	Lorenzo Silva, Hjalmar Hach and Carlo Burelli	Horrible Guild and HeidelBÄR Games	Nominated

Children's Game of the Year
Game	Designer	Publisher	Result
Speedy Roll (Hedgehog Roll)	Urtis Šulinskas	Piatnik	Won
Foto Fish	Michael Kallauch	Logis	Nominated
Wir sind die Roboter (Robots)	Reinhard Staupe	NSV	Nominated

=== 2021 awards ===
The nominations for the 2021 award were announced on May 18, 2021. The award for Children's Game of the Year was announced on June 14, 2021. The winners were announced on July 19, 2021.

Game of the Year
Game	Designer	Publisher	Result
MicroMacro: Crime City	Johannes Sich	Edition Spielwiese and Pegasus Spiele	Won
Die Abenteuer des Robin Hood (The Adventures of Robin Hood)	Michael Menzel	Kosmos	Nominated
Zombie Teenz Evolution	Annick Lobet	Scorpion Masqué	Nominated

Connoisseur-gamer Game of the Year
Game	Designer	Publisher	Result
Paleo	Peter Rustemeyer	Hans im Glück	Won
Die verlorenen Ruinen von Arnak (Lost Ruins of Arnak)	Michaela Štachová and Michal Štach	CGE	Nominated
Fantastische Reiche (Fantasy Realms)	Bruce Glassco	Strohmann Games and WizKids	Nominated

Children's Game of the Year
Game	Designer	Publisher	Result
Dragomino	Bruno Cathala, Marie Fort and Wilfried Fort	Pegasus Spiele and Blue Orange	Won
Fabelwelten (Storytailors)	Wilfried Fort and Marie Fort	Lifestyle Boardgames	Nominated
Mia London	Antoine Bauza and Corentin Lebrat	Scorpion Masqué	Nominated

=== 2022 awards ===
The nominations for the 2022 award were announced on May 23, 2022. The award for Children's Game of the Year was announced on June 20, 2022. The winners were announced on July 17, 2022.

Game of the Year
Game	Designer	Publisher	Result
Cascadia	Randy Flynn	Flatout Games, AEG, and Kosmos	Won
Scout	Kei Kajino	Oink Games	Nominated
Top Ten	Aurélien Picolet	Cocktail Games	Nominated

Connoisseur-gamer Game of the Year
Game	Designer	Publisher	Result
Living Forest	Aske Christiansen	Pegasus Spiele and Ludonaute	Won
Cryptid	Hal Duncan and Ruth Veevers	Osprey Games/Skellig Games	Nominated
Dune: Imperium	Paul Dennen	Dire Wolf	Nominated

Children's Game of the Year
Game	Designer	Publisher	Result
Zauberberg (Magic Mountain)	Jens-Peter Schliemann and Bernhard Weber	Amigo	Won
Auch schon clever (Ganz Schön Clever Kids)	Wolfgang Warsch	Schmidt	Nominated
Mit Quacks & Co. nach Quedlinburg (Quacks & Co. Quedlinburg Dash)	Wolfgang Warsch	Schmidt	Nominated

=== 2023 awards ===
The nominations for the 2023 award were announced on May 22, 2023. The winners were announced on July 21, 2023.

Game of the Year
Game	Designer	Publisher	Result
Dorfromantik: Das Brettspiel (Dorfromantik: The Board Game)	Michael Palm and Lukas Zach	Pegasus Spiele	Won
Fun Facts	Kaspar Lapp	Repos Productions	Nominated
Next Station London	Matthew Dunstan	HCM Kinzel	Nominated

Connoisseur-gamer Game of the Year
Game	Designer	Publisher	Result
Challengers!	Johannes Krenner and Markus Slawitscheck	1 More Time Games and Z-Man Games	Won
Iki	Koota Yamada	Giant Roc / Sorry We Are French	Nominated
Planet Unknown	Ryan Lambert and Adam Rehberg	Strohmann Games / Adam’s Apple Games	Nominated

Children's Game of the Year
Game	Designer	Publisher	Result
Mysterium Kids	Antonin Boccara and Yves Hirschfeld	Libellud / Space Cow	Won
Carla Caramel	Sara Zarian	Loki	Nominated
Gigamon (Gigamons)	Johann Roussel and Karim Aouidad	Mirakulus / Studio H	Nominated

Special Prize
Game	Designer	Publisher	Category	Result
Unlock! Game Adventures	Cyril Demaegd, Mathieu Casnin, Thomas Cauët and Jeremy Koch	Space Cowboys	Connoisseur-gamer Game of the Year Special Prize	Won
Unlock! Kids: Detektivgeschichten (Unlock! Kids: Detective Stories)	Cyril Demaegd, Wilfried Fort, Marie Fort	Space Cow	Children's Game of the Year Special Prize	Won

=== 2024 awards ===
The nominations for the 2024 award were announced on June 11, 2024. The winners were announced on July 21, 2024.

Game of the Year
Game	Designer	Publisher	Result
Sky Team	Luc Rémond	Kosmos / Scorpion Masqué	Won
Auf den Wegen von Darwin (In the Footsteps of Darwin)	Grégory Grard and Matthieu Verdier	Sorry We Are French	Nominated
Captain Flip	Paolo Mori and Remo Conzadori	Playpunk	Nominated

Connoisseur-gamer Game of the Year
Game	Designer	Publisher	Result
e-Mission (Daybreak)	Matt Leacock and Matteo Menapace	Schmidt / CMYK	Won
Die Gilde der fahrenden Händler (The Guild of Merchant Explorers)	Matthew Dunstan and Brett J. Gilbert	Skellig Games / AEG	Nominated
Zug um Zug Legacy: Legenden des Westens (Ticket to Ride Legacy: Legends of the West)	Rob Daviau, Matt Leacock and Alan R. Moon	Days of Wonder	Nominated

Children's Game of the Year
Game	Designer	Publisher	Result
Die magischen Schlüssel (Magic Keys)	Markus Slawitschek and Arno Steinwender	Game Factory / Happy Baobab	Won
Große kleine Edelsteine	Wolfgang Warsch	Schmidt	Nominated
Taco Katze Pizza Junior (Taco Kitten Pizza)	Dave Campbell and Thierry Denoual	Blue Orange	Nominated

=== 2025 awards ===
The nominations for the 2025 award were announced on May 20, 2025. The winners were announced on July 13, 2025.

Game of the Year
Game	Designer	Publisher	Result
Bomb Busters	Hisashi Hayashi	Pegasus Games / Cocktail Games	Won
Flip 7	Eric Olsen	Kosmos / The Op Games	Nominated
Krakel Orakel	7 Bazis	Topp	Nominated

Connoisseur-gamer Game of the Year
Game	Designer	Publisher	Result
Endeavor: Die Tiefsee (Deep Sea)	Carl de Visser and Jarratt Gray	Frosted Games / Board Game Circus / Burnt Island Games / Grand Gamers Guild	Won
Faraway	Johannes Goupy and Corentin Lebrat	Kosmos / Catch Up Games	Nominated
Neuland (Looot)	Charles Chevallier and Laurent Escoffier	Game Factory / Gigamic	Nominated

Children's Game of the Year
Game	Designer	Publisher	Result
Top the cake	Wolfgang Warsch	Schmidt	Won
Cascadia Junior	Fertessa Allyse and Randy Flynn	Kosmos / AEG / Flatout Games	Nominated
The Mice Gang (Le Clan des Souris)	Christophe Lauras	Game Factory / Débâcle Jeux	Nominated

=== 2026 awards ===
The nominations for the 2026 award were announced on May 19, 2026. The winners were announced on July 12, 2026.

Game of the Year
Game	Designer	Publisher	Result
Dito! (JinxO)	Martin Ang	Game Factory / Tabletoys	Won
Cozy Stickerville	Corey Konieczka	Unexpected Games	Nominated
Morty Sorty Magic Shop	Markus Slawitscheck	Schmidt	Nominated

Connoisseur-gamer Game of the Year
Game	Designer	Publisher	Result
Rebirth	Reiner Knizia	Frosted Games / Mighty Boards	Won
Boss Fighters QR	Michael Palm and Lukas Zach	Pegasus Spiele	Nominated
Moon Colony Bloodbath	Donald X. Vaccarino	Alea / Rio Grande Games	Nominated

Children's Game of the Year
Game	Designer	Publisher	Result
Die Insel der Mookies (Mooki Island)	Florian Sirieix	Kosmos / Scorpion Masqué	Won
Buh Party (Boo Party)	Florian Sirieix and Benoit Turpin	Loki	Nominated
Verflixt Verzaubert (Mimose & Sam)	Thomas Dagenais-Lespérance	Game Factory / Locomuse	Nominated

== All winners ==
=== Game of the year ===
Year	Game	Designer	Publisher
1979	Hare and Tortoise	David Parlett	Ravensburger
1980	Rummikub	Ephraim Hertzano	Intelli
1981	Focus	Sid Sackson	Parker
1982	Enchanted Forest	Alex Randolph and Michel Matschoss	Ravensburger
1983	Scotland Yard	Werner Schlegel, Dorothy Garrels, Fritz Ifland, Manfred Burggraf, Werner Scheerer and Wolf Hoermann	Ravensburger
1984	Railway Rivals	David Watts	Schmidt Games
1985	Sherlock Holmes: Consulting Detective	Raymond Edwards, Suzanne Goldberg and Gary Grady	Kosmos
1986	Top Secret Spies	Wolfgang Kramer	Ravensburger
1987	Auf Achse	Wolfgang Kramer	F.X. Schmid
1988	Barbarossa	Klaus Teuber	Altenburger und Stralsunder
1989	Café International	Rudi Hoffmann	Mattel
1990	Adel Verpflichtet	Klaus Teuber	F.X. Schmid
1991	Drunter und Drüber	Klaus Teuber	Hans im Glück
1992	Um Reifenbreite	Rob Bontenbal	Jumbo
1993	Call my Bluff	Richard Borg	F.X. Schmid
1994	Manhattan	Andreas Seyfarth	Hans im Glück
1995	The Settlers of Catan	Klaus Teuber	Kosmos
1996	El Grande	Wolfgang Kramer and Richard Ulrich	Hans im Glück
1997	Mississippi Queen	Werner Hodel	Goldsieber
1998	Elfenland	Alan R. Moon	Amigo Spiele
1999	Tikal	Wolfgang Kramer and Michael Kiesling	Ravensburger
2000	Torres	Wolfgang Kramer and Michael Kiesling	Ravensburger
2001	Carcassonne	Klaus-Jürgen Wrede	Hans im Glück
2002	Villa Paletti	Bill Payne	Zoch Verlag
2003	Alhambra	Dirk Henn	Queen Games
2004	Ticket to Ride	Alan R. Moon	Days of Wonder
2005	Niagara	Thomas Liesching	Zoch Verlag
2006	Thurn and Taxis	Andreas Seyfarth and Karen Seyfarth	Hans im Glück
2007	Zooloretto	Michael Schacht	Abacus Spiele
2008	Keltis	Reiner Knizia	Kosmos
2009	Dominion	Donald X. Vaccarino	Rio Grande Games
2010	Dixit	Jean-Louis Roubira	Libellud
2011	Qwirkle	Susan McKinley Ross	Mindware Spiele
2012	Kingdom Builder	Donald X. Vaccarino	Queen Games
2013	Hanabi	Antoine Bauza	Abacusspiele
2014	Camel Up	Steffen Bogen	Eggertspiele
2015	Colt Express	Christophe Raimbault	Ludonaute
2016	Codenames	Vlaada Chvátil	Czech Games Edition
2017	Kingdomino	Bruno Cathala	Pegasus games
2018	Azul	Michael Kiesling	Next Move/Plan B Games
2019	Just One	Ludovic Roudy and Bruno Sautter	Repos Production
2020	Pictures	Daniela and Christian Stöhr	PD-Verlag
2021	MicroMacro: Crime City	Johannes Sich	Edition Spielwiese and Pegasus games
2022	Cascadia	Randy Flynn	Flatout Games, AEG, and Kosmos
2023	Dorfromantik	Michael Palm and Lukas Zach	Pegasus games
2024	Sky Team	Luc Rémond	Kosmos / Scorpion Masqué
2025	Bomb Busters	Hisashi Hayashi	Pegasus games
2026	JinxO	Martin Ang	Game Factory / Tabletoys

=== Connoisseurs' game of the year ===
Year	Game	Designer	Publisher
2011	7 Wonders	Antoine Bauza	Repos Production
2012	Village	Inka Brand and Markus Brand	eggertspiele and Pegasus games
2013	Legends of Andor	Michael Menzel	Fantasy Flight Games
2014	Istanbul	Rüdiger Dorn	Pegasus games
2015	Broom Service	Andreas Pelikan and Alexander Pfister	Ravensburger
2016	Isle of Skye: From Chieftain to King	Andreas Pelikan and Alexander Pfister	Mayfair
2017	Exit - The Game	Inka Brand and Markus Brand	Kosmos
2018	The Quacks of Quedlinburg	Wolfgang Warsch	Schmidt Games
2019	Wingspan	Elizabeth Hargrave	Stonemaier Games
2020	The Crew: The Quest for Planet Nine	Thomas Sing	Kosmos
2021	Paleo	Peter Rustemeyer	Hans im Glück
2022	Living Forest	Aske Christiansen	Pegasus games and Ludonaute
2023	Challengers!	Johannes Krenner and Markus Slawitscheck	1 More Time Games and Z-Man Games
2024	Daybreak	Matt Leacock and Matteo Menapace	Schmidt
2025	Endeavor: Deep Sea	Carl de Visser and Jarratt Gray	Burnt Island Games and Grand Gamers Guild
2026	Rebirth	Reiner Knizia	Frosted Games / Mighty Boards

=== Children's game of the year ===
Year	Game	Designer	Publisher
1989	Gute Freunde	Alex Randolph	Selecta
1990	My Haunted Castle (German title: Das Geisterschloss)	Virginia Charves	F.X. Schmid
1991	Corsaro – Irrfahrt im Piratenmeer	Wolfgang Kramer	Herder
1992	Galloping Pigs (German title: Schweinsgalopp)	Heinz Meister	Ravensburger
1993	Ringel Rangel	Geni Wyss	Habermaaß
1994	Loopin' Louie	Carol Wiseley	Milton Bradley
1995	Karambolage	Heinz Meister	Habermaaß
1996	Noah's Park (German title: Vier zu Mir)	Heike Baum	Altenburger und Stralsunder
1997	Leinen Los!	Alex Randolph	Habermaaß
1998	Chicken Cha Cha Cha	Klaus Zoch	Zoch Verlag
1999	Kayanak	Peter-Paul Joopen	Habermaaß
2000	Arbos	Armin Müller and Martin Arnold	M+A Spiel
2001	Klondike	Christian Wolf and Stefanie Rohner	Habermaaß
2002	The Ladybug's Costume Party (German title: Maskenball der Käfer)	Peter-Paul Joopen	Selecta
2003	Viva Topo!	Manfred Ludwig	Selecta
2004	Spooky Stairs (German title: Geistertreppe)	Michelle Schanen	Drei Magier Spiele
2005	Das Kleine Gespenst	Kai Haferkamp	Kosmos
2006	Der Schwarze Pirat	Guido Hoffmann	Habermaaß
2007	Beppo der Bock	Peter Schackert	Huch & Friends
2008	Wer war's?	Reiner Knizia	Ravensburger
2009	The Magic Labyrinth	Dirk Baumann	Drei Magier Spiele
2010	Diego Drachenzahn	Manfred Ludwig	HABA
2011	Da ist der Wurm drin	Carmen Kleinert	Zoch Verlag
2012	Schnappt Hubi!	Steffen Bogen	Ravensburger
2013	Der verzauberte Turm	Inka and Markus Brand	Schmidt/Marke Drei Magier Spiele
2014	Geister, Geister, Schatzsuchmeister! (English title: Ghost Fightin' Treasure Hunters)	Brian Yu	Mattel Games
2015	Spinderella	Roberto Fraga	Zoch Verlag
2016	My First Stone Age	Marco Teubner	ZMAN Games
2017	Ice Cool	Brian Gomez	Amigo
2018	Funkelschatz (English title: Dragon's Breath)	Lena and Günter Burkhardt	HABA
2019	Tal der Wikinger (English title: Valley of the Vikings)	Marie and Wilfried Fort	HABA
2020	Speedy Roll (Alternate title: Hedgehog Roll)	Urtis Šulinskas	Piatnik
2021	Dragomino	Bruno Cathala, Marie Fort and Wilfried Fort	Pegasus games and Blue Orange
2022	Zauberberg (English title: Magic Mountain)	Jens-Peter Schliemann and Bernhard Weber	Amigo
2023	Mysterium Kids	Antonin Boccara and Yves Hirschfeld	Libellud / Space Cow
2024	Die magischen Schlüssel (English title: Magic Keys)	Markus Slawitschek and Arno Steinwender	Game Factory / Happy Baobab
2025	Topp die Torte! (English title: Top the Cake!)	Wolfgang Warsch	Schmidt
2026	Die Insel der Mookies (English title: Mooki Island)	Florian Sirieix	Kosmos / Scorpion Masqué

=== Special awards ===
Year	Prize	Game	Designer	Publisher
1979	Beautiful game	Seti	No specific designer	Bütehorn
1980	Beautiful game	Spiel	Reinhold Wittig	Edition Perlhuhn
1980	Solitaire	Rubik's Cube	Ernő Rubik	
1981	Beautiful game	Ra	Marco Donadoni	International Team
1982	Beautiful game	Skript	Henri Sala	Jumbo
1983	Beautiful game	Wir füttern die kleinen Nilpferde	Reinhold Wittig	Edition Perlhuhn
1984	Beautiful game	Uisge	Roland Siegers	Hexagames
1985	Beautiful game	Die Magier	Johann Rüttinger	Noris Spiele
1986	Beautiful game	Müller & Sohn	Rei'nhold Wittig	Kosmos
1987	Beautiful game	Orient Express	Jeff Smets	Jumbo
1988	Beautiful game	Inkognito	Alex Randolph and Leo Colovini	Milton Bradley
1988	Cooperative family game	Sauerbaum	Johannes Tranelis	
1989	Beautiful game	Henne Berta	Geni Wyss	Habermaaß
1990	Beautiful game	Life Style	No specific designer	Ravensburger
1991	Beautiful game	Master Labyrinth	Max Kobbert	Ravensburger
1992	No special prizes awarded			
1993	Beautiful game	Kula Kula	Reinhold Wittig	Blatz Spiele
1994	Beautiful game	Doctor Faust	Reinhold Wittig	Blatz Spiele
1995	Beautiful game	Tri-Ba-Lance	Michael Sohre	Theta Promotions
1995	Puzzle	3D Krimi-Puzzle	No specific designer	
1996	Beautiful game	Venice Connection	Alex Randolph	Drei Magier Spiele
1996	Dexterity game	Carabande	Jean du Poel	
1997	Beautiful game	Aztec	Nicolas Neuwahl	Zoch Verlag
1997	Dexterity game	Husarengolf	Torsten Marold	
1998–2000	No special prizes awarded			
2001	Literary game	Lord of the Rings	Reiner Knizia	Kosmos
2001	Historical game	Troia	Thomas Fackler	
2002–03	No special prizes awarded			
2004	Recommended	Attika	Marcel-André Casasola Merkle	Rio Grande
2005	No special prizes awarded			
2006	Fantasy game	Shadows Over Camelot	Serge Laget and Bruno Cathala	Days of Wonder
2006	Complex game	Caylus	William Attia	
2007	No special prizes awarded			
2008	Complex game	Agricola	Uwe Rosenberg	Lookout Games
2009	New game worlds	Space Alert	Vlaada Chvátil	Czech Games Edition
2009	Party game	Gift Trap	Nick Kellet	
2010	Game of the Year plus	World Without End	Michael Rieneck and Stefan Stadler	Kosmos
2011–17	No special prizes awarded			
2018	Special prize	Pandemic Legacy: Season 2	Matt Leacock and Rob Daviau	Z-Man Games
2019–22	No special prizes awarded			
2023	Special prize	Unlock! Game Adventures and Unlock! Kids: Detective Stories	Cyril Demaegd, Mathieu Casnin, Thomas Cauët and Jeremy Koch	Space Cowboys

== See also ==
- Deutscher Spiele Preis
- International Gamers Award
- As d'Or
- Origins Award
