= 2016 in games =

This page lists board and card games, wargames, miniatures games, and tabletop role-playing games published in 2016. For video games, see 2016 in video gaming.

== Games released or invented in 2016 ==
- Arkham Horror: The Card Game
- Beasts of Balance
- Cry Havoc
- A Feast for Odin
- Hero Realms
- Kingdomino
- Mechs vs. Minions
- Ophidian 2360
- The Oregon Trail Card Game
- Scythe
- SeaFall
- Secret Hitler
- Star Wars: Rebellion
- Tak
- Terraforming Mars
- Trumped Up Cards

== Game awards given in 2016 ==
- Mombasa won the Spiel Portugal Jogo do Ano.
- Codenames, published by Czech Games Edition, won the Spiel des Jahres.
- Isle of Skye: From Chieftain to King, published by Lookout GmbH, won the Kennerspiel des Jahres.
- Stone Age Junior won the Kinderspiel des Jahres.

== Significant games-related events in 2016 ==
- On November 10, the National Toy Hall of Fame at the Strong National Museum of Play in Rochester, New York announced its 2016 inductees, which included Dungeons & Dragons, published by Wizards of the Coast. The other inductees were Fisher-Price Little People and the swing.
- Backers pledged $113 million to tabletop game projects on Kickstarter during 2016, a 28% increase over the previous year's $88.9 million.

== Deaths ==
Date	Name	Age	Notability
February 6	Erwin Glonnegger	90	Game designer
February 9	Wayne England	56	Artist for Dungeons & Dragons and Magic: The Gathering
February 10	Christopher Rush	50	Artist for Magic: The Gathering
March 25	Ken Barr	83	Artist who contributed to Torg and other games
April 4	Eric Dott	89	Owner of Avalon Hill
June 20	Goro Hasegawa	83	Designer of the board game Othello
September 24	Jeff Mackintosh	45	Designer with Guardians of Order
November 29	Joe Dever	60	Designer of the Lone Wolf gamebooks

== See also ==
- List of game manufacturers
- 2016 in video gaming
