= 2019 in games =

This page lists board and card games, wargames, miniatures games, and tabletop role-playing games published in 2019. For video games, see 2019 in video gaming.

== Games released or invented in 2019 ==
- The Crew
- The Fantasy Trip Legacy Edition
- Ms. Monopoly
- Shasn
- Wingspan

== Game awards given in 2019 ==
- Just One won Game of the Year in the Spiel des Jahres.
- Wingsan won the 2019 Kennerspiel des Jahres Winner (Connoisseur-gamer game of the year)
- Root won Game of the Year in the Origins Awards.
- UBOOT The Board Game won the Charles S. Roberts Award War Boardgame of the Year.
- Star Crossed, a role-playing game by Alex Roberts and published by Bully Pulpit Games won the Diana Jones Award
- Chronicles of Crime won the American Tabletop Awards Strategy Game award.
- Root won the American Tabletop Awards Complex Game award.
- The Mind won the As d'Or Jeu de l'Année.
- Detective won the As d'Or Grand Prix.
- Mr. Wolf won the As d'Or Jeu de l'Année Enfant.
- Wingspan won the Board Game Quest Awards Game of the Year.
- Wingspan won the Deutscher Spiele Preis.
- Wingspan won the Diamond Climber Award Game of the Year.
- Wingspan won The Dice Tower Game of the Year.
- Root won the Spiel Portugal Jogo do Ano.
- Wingspan won the Golden Geek Award Game of the Year.
- Architects of the West Kingdom, Gizmos, Gunkimono, Planet and Victorian Masterminds won the Mensa Select Award.

== Significant game-related events in 2019 ==
- Vlaada Chvátil was inducted into the Origins Hall of Fame.
- Gerald Brom was inducted into the Origins Hall of Fame.
- Mage Knight was inducted into the Origins Hall of Fame.
- Apples to Apples was inducted into the Origins Hall of Fame.

== Deaths ==
| Date | Name | Age | Notability |
|---|---|---|---|
| January 2 | Darwin Bromley | 68 | Founder of Mayfair Games |
| January 16 | Bob Pepper | 80 | Game illustrator |
| March 16 | Larry DiTillio | 71 | Writer of Masks of Nyarlathotep |
| April 21 | Theo Coster | 90 | Co-founder of game company Theora Concepts |
| July 26 | Richard Berg | 76 | Prolific wargame designer |
| August 23 | Rick Loomis | 72 | Co-founder of Flying Buffalo |
| August 23 | Thomas Nicely | 72 | Mathematics professor who also designed sports board games for Avalon Hill |
| October 23 | Francis Tresham | | Board game designer |
| November 14 | Chad Jensen | 52 | Wargame designer |
| November 19 | Tom Lyle | 66 | Comics artist who contributed to Champions |
| December 17 | Roger Raupp | 56 | Games artist |

== See also ==
- List of game manufacturers
- 2019 in video gaming
