= The Game (dice game) =

1979 dice game

Das Spiel (German name)
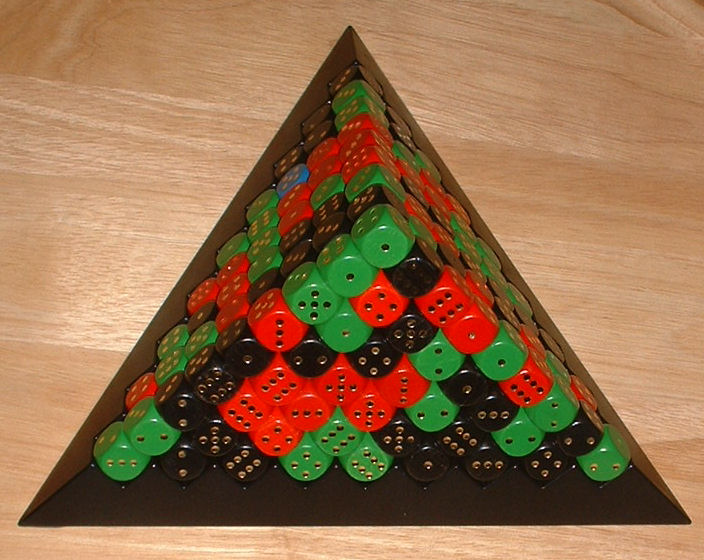
- The Game
- Designers: Reinhold Wittig
- Illustrators: Guido Hoffmann
- Publishers: Edition Perlhuhn (1979); Franckh-Kosmos (1986); Abacusspiele (2004)
- Years active: 1979 to present
- Players: 1 to 6
- Website: Edition Perlhuhn; Abacusspiele

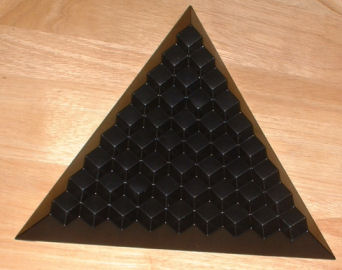
Game platform

The Game is a dice game designed by Reinhold Wittig. It was first published in Germany in 1979, without rules and under the German name Das Spiel.

It contains a triangular base plate and 281 dice of four different colours, and a rule book that gives rules for some 50+ games. Most of the games are centered on building or demolishing pyramids of dice, but there are also racing games and games of skill. The game has been originally published by Diego Rodriguez (Reinhold Wittig), Göttingen, in 1979.

The Game won the 1980 Spiel des Jahres special award for "most beautiful game".

In his preface Wittig writes:

I've often been asked how you go about it to invent a game. I want to add one answer now. Is perhaps the best answer possible to show the many different ways of designing a game. The answer is also a challenge: Invent rules of your own to my dice pyramid.

The first edition of the game was a small version of the dice pyramid, without any rules. Over time, players contributed their own rules to a collection.

== Reviews ==
- Jeux & Stratégie #47 (as "Le Jeu")

== See also ==
- Game design
