= Istanbul (board game) =

Board game

- The box cover of Istanbul
- Designers: Rüdiger Dorn
- Publishers: Pegasus Spiele; Albi
- Players: 2 to 5
- Playing time: 50 minutes
- Age range: 10 and up

Istanbul is a Euro-style board game designed by Rüdiger Dorn and illustrated by Andreas Resch and Hans-Georg Schneider, published in 2014 by Pegasus Spiele.

Istanbul won the Kennerspiel des Jahres award in 2014. An expansion, Istanbul: Mocha & Baksheesh, which includes coffee, guild halls and taverns, was released in 2015. The expansion Istanbul: Letters & Seals, which has players delivering letters and may be integrated with the other expansion, was released in 2016.

== Gameplay ==
The players move a merchant and his four assistants through the bazaar in Istanbul. At various locations, you can leave assistants to handle specific tasks and you need to pick them up again, once finished. Hence careful planning of the allocation of your assistants is needed. During the game, the merchant pushes a wheelbarrow of increasable size and acquires special abilities, but most importantly buys and sells goods in order to be the first one to acquire five rubies.

== Reception ==
The game has received predominantly positive reviews and sits in the top 150 of all board games according to BGG. I Slay The Dragon mentioned that the game 'offers some unique ideas and employs an overall game strategy that is sound' where as Board Games Land mentioned that the game 'stands out as a perfect family board game due to its elegant and smart design'. Paste Magazine has also described Istanbul as 'fantastic family game'.

== Awards and nominations ==
- 2014 Kennerspiel des Jahres winner
- 2014 Swiss Gamers Award Winner
- 2014 Gouden Ludo Winner
- 2014 Golden Geek Board Game of the Year Nominee
- 2014 Golden Geek Best Strategy Board Game Nominee
- 2014 Golden Geek Best Family Board Game Nominee
- 2014 Meeples' Choice Nominee

Preceded by Legends of Andor	Kennerspiel des Jahres; 2014	Succeeded by Broom Service
