= FITS (board game) =

2009 board game

- Back cover of box illustrating game components
- Designers: Reiner Knizia
- Publishers: Ravensburger
- Players: 1-4
- Playing time: 30-45 minutes
- Age range: 10 and up

FITS (Fill In The Spaces) is a Tetris-like board game published by Ravensburger in 2009.

== Description ==
FITS is a board game for 1–4 players in which the players try to use their polyominoes to fill in blank spaces.

=== Components ===
- four inclined player boards
- 8 double-sided cardboard inserts (4 sets of two)
- 64 plastic playing pieces resembling the five shapes used in Tetris, divided into four sets of 16
- a deck of Start cards
- a deck of Build cards
- rule sheet

=== Setup ===
Each player receives a player board, and a set of 16 playing pieces. The players insert the first cardboard insert onto their inclined player board, draw a Start card from the deck and place the corresponding piece at the bottom of the ramped board.

=== Gameplay ===
In each of four rounds, the players draw a card from the deck, take the indicated shape, place it at the top of the board in the orientation desired, then pull the shape down to the bottom of the board. Once the shape has been placed at the top of the board, the player may not rotate the shape or shift it right or left of the original placement, but must pull it straight down. (The player can choose to pass if they feel a particular a piece will cause problems in fulfilling their objectives.) Each round ends when all players have drawn 16 cards from the Build deck. The round is then scored, and the players move on to the next round.

==== Round 1 ====
The cardboard insert for Round 1 is covered with rows of dots. Like Tetris, the goal in the first round is to leave as few open spaces as possible. For every dot left uncovered, the player scores -1. For each complete row built, the player scores +1.

==== Round 2 ====
The insert for Round 2 has dots, but also has some white circles with numbers in them. While still trying to cover the dots, the goal of Round 2 is to leave the white circles uncovered. At the end of the round, for each circle left uncovered, players score the amount indicated in the circle, while still receiving -1 for each dot left uncovered.

==== Round 3 ====
The insert for Round 3 also has dots and white circles, but some of the circles now contain a -5. In addition to receiving -1 for uncovered dots, +1 for complete rows, and positive scores for leaving positive numbers uncovered, players receive -5 for each penalty circle left uncovered.

==== Round 4 ====
In addition to dots, the insert also outlines two of the five shapes. In addition to the usual -1 for uncovered dots, and +1 for complete rows, players also receive either 3 points for keeping both shapes uncovered, -3 if only one shape is uncovered, or 0 points if both shapes are covered.

=== Victory conditions ===
At the end of four rounds, the player with the highest overall score wins the game.

== Publication history ==
FITS was designed by Reiner Knizia, with artwork by KniffDesign and Piotr Kania, and was published by Ravensburger in 2009. It was subsequently published under license in other countries by Egmont Polska and White Goblin Games.

== Reception ==
On the German site Spielmonster, Dirk Trefzger, a self-admitted fan of Tetris, didn't like the rule that pieces could not be rotated or shifted left or right once they had started their descent, feeling that this made the game overly simplistic. Trefzger found the cardboard pieces were too thin, and the ramped boards too flimsy. He did admit that "Some players in the test rounds still found the game quite good. It's easy to explain, it's quick to play, you don't have to think hard." Nevertheless he concluded by giving the game a poor score of only 4 out of 10, calling it "a gap filler without any particular appeal."

Michael Weber, reviewing the game for the German site Reich der Spiele, also found the playing pieces too flimsy. He did note that everyone liked playing one game of four rounds, but the game quickly lost its appeal after that.

On the German game review site 4 Players, Jörg Luibi liked the game, saying, "It is easy to explain, plays quickly and [...] Because it is short and complex, it never gets boring."

== Awards ==
- 2009 Spiel des Jahres nominee
  - Also received "Recommended" certification in "Hit für Familien" category
- 2009 Golden Geek Awards: Nominated in four categories — Most Innovative Board Game, Best Party Board Game, Best Family Board Game, Best Children's Board Game
- 2010 JoTa Awards: Best Family Board Game nominee
