= Uisge =

Board game with 12 pieces that may be moved horizontally or vertically

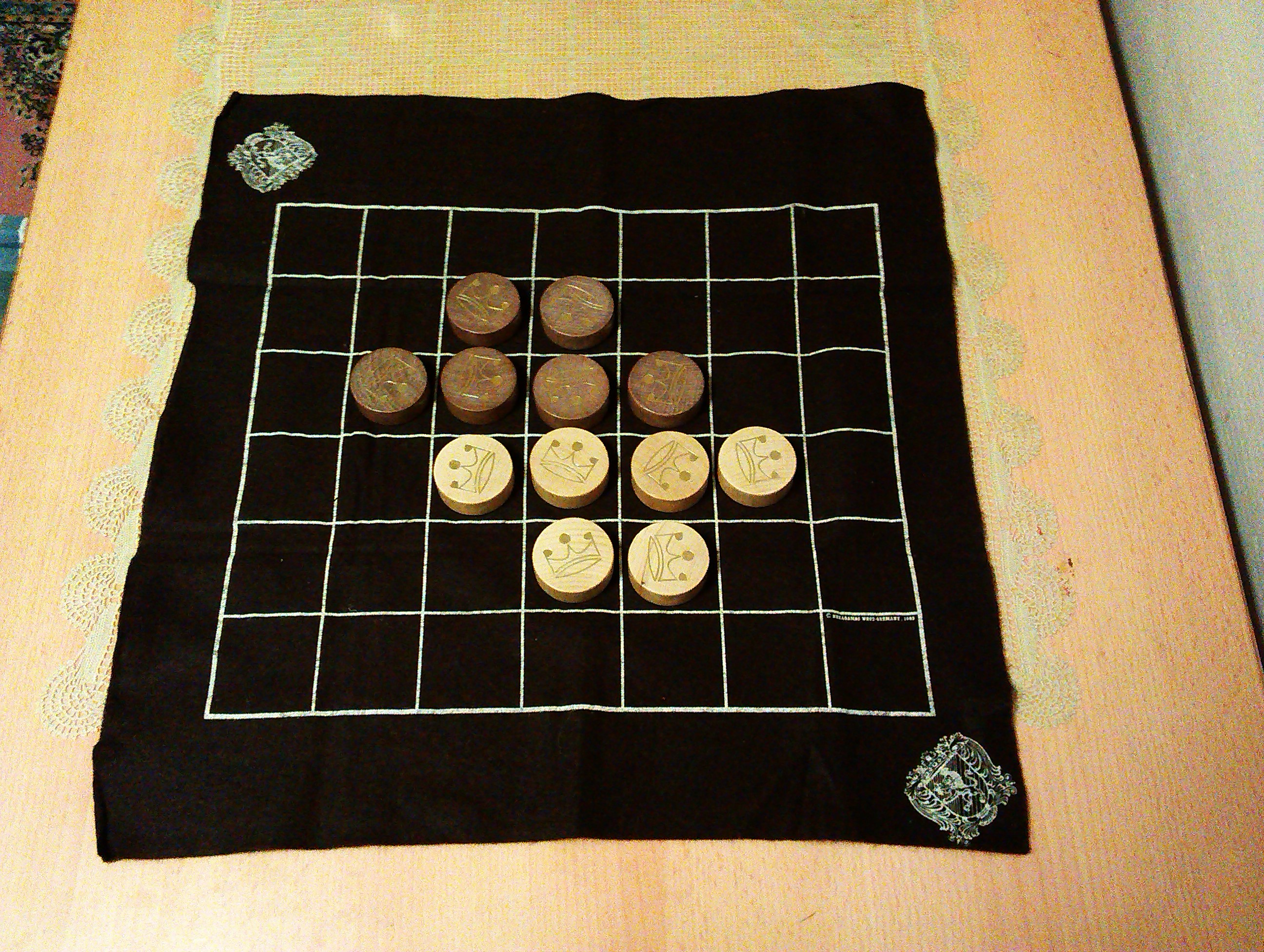
- Starting position for Uisge stones on a black fabric field
- Designers: Roland Siegers
- Publishers: Hexagames; Abacusspiele
- Publication: 1983; 43 years ago
- Genres: Strategy games
- Languages: German; English; French
- Players: 2
- Playing time: 30 minutes
- Age range: 10+

Uisge (pronounced: wisk, Scottish Gaelic: for water), also known as Skorpion, is a strategy board game created by Roland Siegers and published in 1984 by Hexagames in which two players attempt to be the first to flip all their playing stones on a rectangular grid.

== Gameplay ==
Uisge is played on a rectangular game board consisting of 42 squares. The game uses twelve round stone game pieces, divided equally between white and black. Each piece has one blank side and one with a crown. To begin, all stones are placed on the board with the blank side facing up. The player controlling the white pieces takes the first turn, followed by the player controlling the black pieces, as in chess.

On a player's turn, a stone can be moved in one of two ways:

- Jump: A piece may jump over a neighbouring one or an opponent's piece in a horizontal or vertical direction, provided the landing space is empty. The jumping stone is flipped, making a blank stone a crown stone and a crown stone a blank stone.
- Move: Only crown pieces may move. It may be moved to an empty adjacent empty field in a horizontal, vertical or diagonal direction. The crown stone is not turned over.

A stone may only be moved if all stones on the field are still connected to each other in a horizontal or vertical direction. No stone or group of stones may stand alone and stones cannot move into a space that would leave them only diagonally connected to the chain.

The object of the game is to flip all ones stones to the crown side before the opponent.

== Reception ==
Uisge was featured as a "break-away game" in the 1983 Spielbox magazine. It was awarded the 1984 Spiel de Jahres special award for "Beautiful Game".
