= Sky Team (board game) =

Two-player cooperative flight landing board game

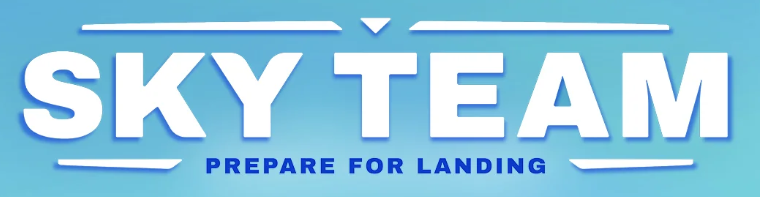
- Designers: Luc Rémond
- Illustrators: Eric Hibbeler; Adrien Rives
- Publishers: Le Scorpion Masqué; 999 Games; ADC Blackfire Entertainment; Geekach Games; Hachette Boardgames USA; Kaissa Chess & Games; Kosmos; Lavka Games; Lucky Duck Games; Reflexshop; Tabletop KZ; YOKA Games
- Publication: 2023; 3 years ago
- Players: 2
- Playing time: 15 minutes
- Age range: 12+

Sky Team is a two-player board game where participants act as pilot and co-pilot to safely land an airplane. It was designed by Luc Rémond and published by Le Scorpion Masqué in 2023.

== Development ==
According to an interview with Polygon, Luc Rémond originally developed Sky Team during the COVID-19 lockdowns as a single-player game, with the two-player communication aspects being added after game testing following the lockdown's lift. The game was published by the Québécois publisher Le Scorpion Masqué, who involved flight commander Robert Piché in the development of one of the game's scenarios. The game debuted in 2023 and was featured at gaming conventions such as Essen Spiel, Gen Con, and Pax Unplugged.

== Gameplay ==
In Sky Team, players work together as a pilot and co-pilot to navigate a commercial airliner through various landing scenarios. Each player rolls dice at the start of each round hidden from the other player. The game requires silent coordination to allocate the dice to slots representing components of a plane, simulating the management of an aircraft's axis, speed, flaps, landing gear, and communication with the control tower. The objective is to adjust these components over multiple rounds so that the plane lands safely at the arrival airport. Sky Team ends in failure if the plane stalls, overshoots, or collides with other planes from the mismanagement of these components.

== Reception ==
Sky Team garnered significant attention and praise during its showcase at Gen Con 2023, as reported by Polygon. The game was highlighted for its originality, engaging mechanics, and successful integration of a real-world flight experience into the board game format. Charlie Theel, writing for Polygon, described the game as a "wonderful modern board game that balances amusement with simulation" and stated that it was "one of 2023’s best board games, one that is singular and unlike anything else in the hobby".

Sky Team was the winner of Dicebreaker's 2023 Tabletop Award for Best Board Game for its "thrillingly unique theme that combines with tight, captivating gameplay for one of the most original cooperative board games in years." The game was later featured in Dicebreaker's list of the "Best Board Games 2024", curated by Alex Meehan. It was also the winner of Board Game Quest's 2023 Best Cooperative Game award and the 2024 Spiel des Jahres.
