= Dragomino =

Children's tile-laying board game

- Designers: Bruno Cathala, Marie Fort, Wilfried Fort
- Illustrators: Christine Deschamps, Maëva da Silva
- Publishers: Blue Orange Games
- Publication: 2020; 6 years ago
- Players: 2–4
- Playing time: 15–20 minutes
- Age range: 5+
- Website: blueorangegames.eu/en/games/dragomino/

Dragomino is a children's tile-laying board game designed by Bruno Cathala, Marie Fort, and Wilfried Fort and published by Blue Orange Games. It is based on Kingdomino.

It won the 2021 Kinderspiel des Jahres.

== Gameplay ==
Each player is a dragon-rider scouting for dragons and begins the game with one base landscape tile consisting of desert terrain and snow terrain. The six types of landscape tiles are desert, forest, mountain, prairie, snow, and volcano. Each turn, the player executes two actions: visit a place, which requires the player to select one of four available tiles; and show a discovery, which requires the player to connect the new tile to their board.

Once this is done, the player checks for connections between the edges of the new tile and those already part of the board. Those with different landscapes result in no action, whereas those with a matching landscape allow the player to take a dragon egg token of the corresponding type, denoted by the colour, for each match. The player then flips the dragon egg token to reveal either a baby dragon or an empty shell. This is then placed at the location of the match.

A baby dragon is worth 1 point, whereas an empty shell has no value but allows the player to obtain the mother dragon token. This token grants the player the first action in the subsequent turn, but may be taken by another player in the same turn. Eggs differ in the probability of having a baby dragon, with red eggs (volcano) most likely and yellow eggs (desert) least likely.

The game ends when all landscape tiles have been taken. Players count the number of baby dragons they have, and the player with the mother dragon token gets a bonus point.

== Reception ==
In a review for Board Game Quest, Jason Kelm states that the game has "fantastic art", particularly for the unique dragons and their diversity. Naomi Laeuchli also stated that the "artwork ... is where the game truly shines" in her review for Casual Game Revolution, and specifically mentioned the "unique and adorable pictures for each dragon".

Kelm also stated that young children may be confused by the two types of green tiles in the game, and the use of the mother dragon to change the starting player each round.
