= Loopin' Louie =

Children's game

He's Just PLANE Outta Control!
- Box Cover
- Designers: Carol Wiseley
- Publishers: Milton Bradley
- Publication: 1992; 34 years ago
- Years active: 5 and up
- Players: 2 to 4
- Setup time: 6 minutes
- Playing time: 10 minutes
- Chance: None
- Skills: Dexterity

Loopin' Louie, is an interactive electronic board game designed by Carol Wiseley and published by Milton Bradley in 1992. It was given the Kinderspiel des Jahres award in 1994. Although the game is designed for a maximum of 4 players, unofficial modifications were made by modders to increase the maximum number of players to eight and later to twelve with three planes. A Star Wars variation called "Loopin' Chewie" was produced by Hasbro in 2015 with three players of which an unofficial modification for six players exists.

== Gameplay ==
=== Assembly ===
The game requires a screwdriver to assemble a central crane tower with a figure of the titular Louie in a plane attached to the end of the crane. Up to four arms are connected to the tower, each with a canal, a barn, three chicken tokens and a lever (paddle). Two AA batteries are required for the motor to rotate the crane.

=== Rules ===
The object of the game is for players to press their respective levers to keep Louie in the air to stop him from knocking the chicken tokens into the canals. Players need to time their lever presses carefully. If Louie hits a chicken token on the barn, it falls down the canal. The player that has at least one chicken token remaining is the winner.

== Reception ==
In Germany, the game is also known as a drinking game. The Wall Street Journal describes it as one of Germany´s most popular drinking games and mentioned in 2014: "In Germany, a country with 81 million people, Looping Louie has sold more than 1.3 million copies since 2006—far more than in any other country".
