= Chicken Cha Cha Cha =

Board game

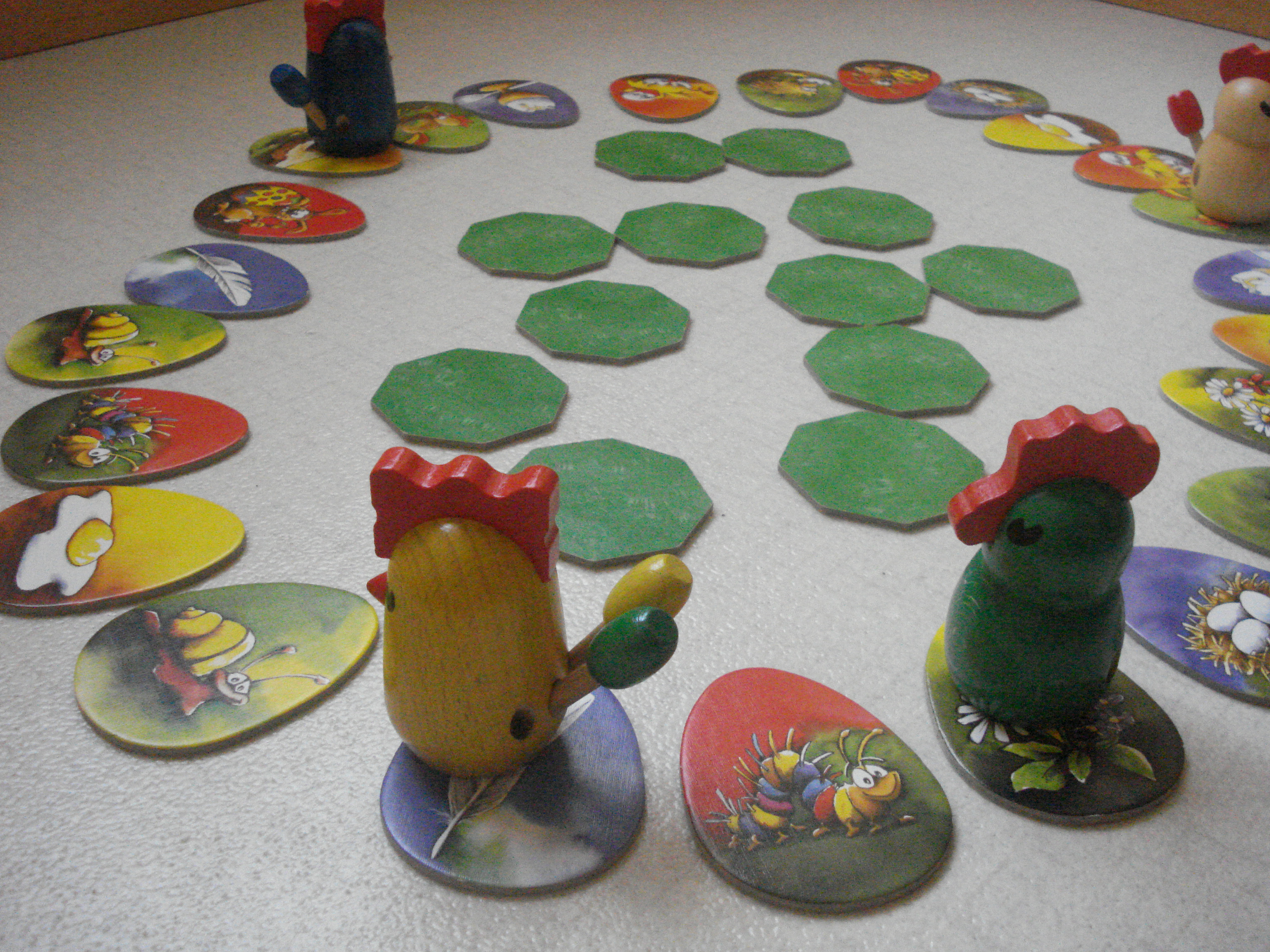
A game of Chicken Cha Cha Cha in progress

Chicken Cha Cha Cha (original German name: Zicke Zacke Hühnerkacke) is a board game for two to four players from four years onwards. It was designed by Klaus Zoch and self-published. It was illustrated by Doris Matthäus. The game was awarded the special prize for children's games in the Spiel des Jahres competition in 1998.

== International releases ==
The game was released in several languages.

- German: Zicke Zacke Hühnerkacke by Zoch Verlag
- English: Chicken Cha Cha Cha by Rio Grande Games
- French: Pique Plume by Gigamic
- Spanish: ¡Cocorico Cocoricó! by Devir
- Dutch: Jakkiebak! Kippenkak! at 999 Games
- Finnish: Kanaset by Tactic
- Hungarian: Csupa Csupasz Tyúkeszű by Piatnik
- Polish: Skubane Kurczaki by Egmont
- Korean: 치킨차차 by Koreaboardgames

== Description ==
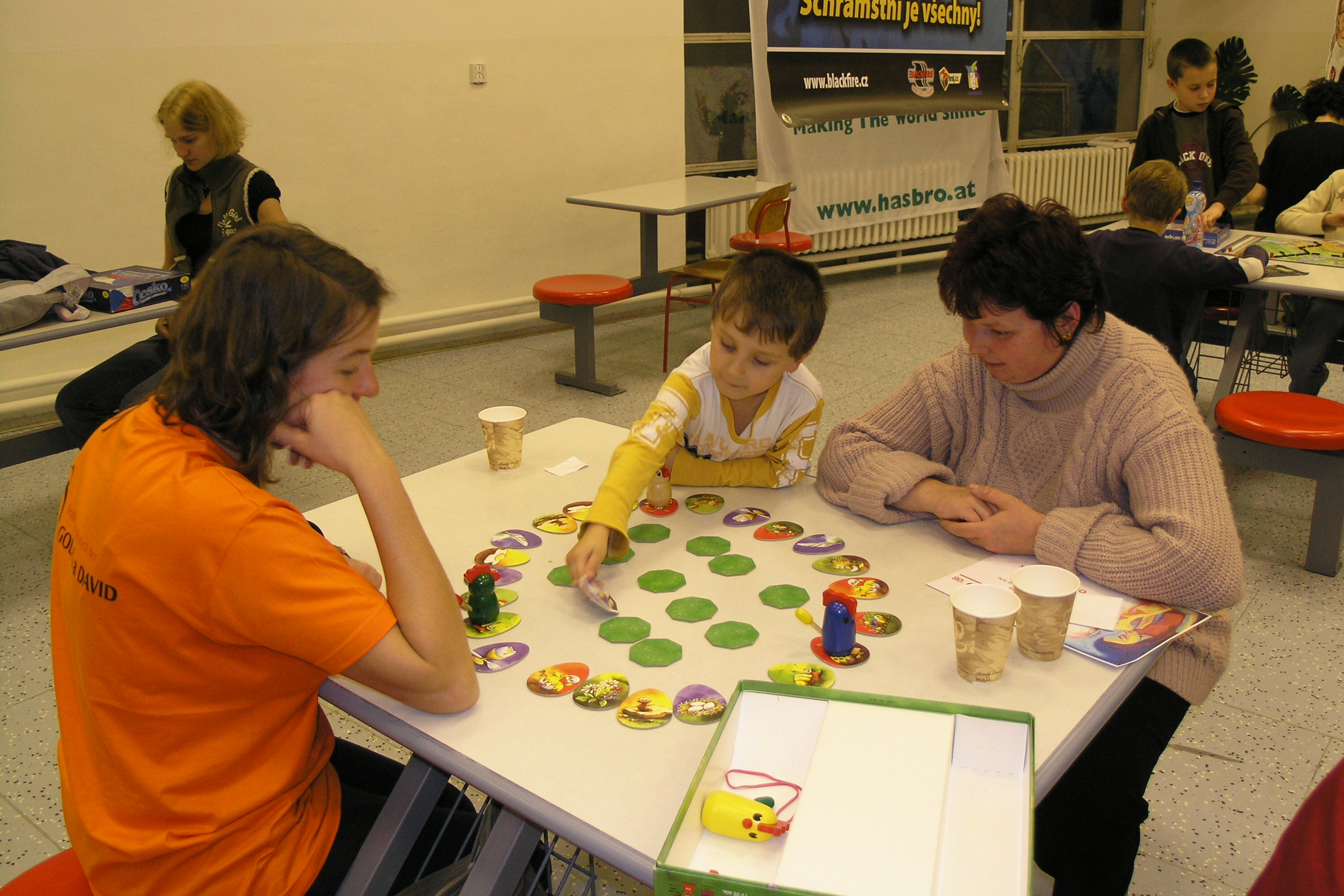
Playing

The game consists of 24 egg-shaped plates with twelve pictures of chickens, rabbits, hedgehogs, flowers and other things to be found at a henhouse, two plates of every design, and twelve octagonal plates with the same illustrations as the egg-shaped plates. These octagonal plates are placed in the centre of the board, face down, and shuffled. The egg-shaped plates are then shuffled and placed in a ring around the octagonal plates, face up. Each player gets a specifically coloured chicken, which has a tail feather of the same colour. The chickens are placed at equal distances on the ring around the board.

On a player's turn, he/she chooses one of the octagonal plates and turns it face up. If it's the same illustration as on the egg-shaped plate in front of the player's chicken, the chicken moves to that plate and the player's turn continues. If it's a different illustration, the player's turn ends. The octagonal plates are then turned back face down. If a player's chicken is directly behind another player's chicken, he/she must find the illustration in front of the other player's chicken. If this succeeds, his/her chicken jumps over the other player's chicken and takes all of its feathers. The player who first gets all feathers of every chicken wins the game.

The game is based on Concentration and is thus suitable for both children and adults, especially after the third or fourth round.
