= 2021 in games =

This page lists board and card games, wargames, miniatures games, and tabletop role-playing games published in 2021. For video games, see 2021 in video gaming.

== Games released or invented in 2021 ==
- Ark Nova
- Cascadia
- Coyote & Crow
- Digimon Card Game
- Field Guide to Memory
- Jiangshi: Blood in the Banquet Hall
- Living Forest
- Murder Mystery of the Dead
- Oath: Chronicles of Empire and Exile
- Radlands
- Stardew Valley: The Board Game
- Summoner Wars: Second Edition
- Thirsty Sword Lesbians
- Unfathomable
- Wanderhome
- What Next?

== Deaths ==
Date	Name	Age	Notability
February 11	Rowena Morrill	76	Artist who contributed to role-playing games
February 13	Dave Nalle	61	Ragnarok Press
March 20	Ford Ivey	72	NERO International
April 19	Robin Wood	67	Role-playing game artist
April 20	Roland J. Green	76	Dragonlance novelist
May 1	Richard Halliwell	62	Warhammer
June	Ora Coster		Co-founder of game company Theora Concepts
July 16	Stephen Hickman	72	Role-playing game artist
August 12	Blair Reynolds	59	Role-playing game artist
August 13	Steve Perrin	75	Role-playing game designer
September 14	Reuben Klamer	99	Redesigned The Game of Life
September 25	Terry K. Amthor	62	Role-playing game designer
October 21	Jarosław Musiał	59	Role-playing game artist
December 6	Chris Achilléos	74	Illustrator who contributed to tabletop games

== See also ==
- List of game manufacturers
- 2021 in video gaming
