= Finca (game) =

Board game

Finca is a board game published by Hans im Glück. Players collect fruit by stepping around a windmill and then selling the fruit in specific combinations to the various towns on the game board.

== About ==
Finca was designed by Wolfgang Sentker and Ralf zur Linde, and was published in 2009. It is suggested to be played with two to four players, and takes approximately 45 minutes to play. Finca is targeted for ages 8 and up.

== Honors ==
- 2009 Golden Geek Best Family Board Game Nominee
- 2009 Lys Grand Public Finalist
- 2009 Spiel des Jahres Nominee
- 2010 Boardgames Australia Awards Best International Game Nominee

== Details ==
Finca's game board displays the Mediterranean island of Mallorca. Each player tries to harvest and deliver their almonds, grapes, lemons, and oranges. To move these goods, players must move workers on a traditional windmill. Players load their goods onto an old donkey cart, travel the island, and sell wherever necessary. The objective of the game is to distribute the crops as effectively as possible to be able to deliver faster than your opponents.

== Publishers ==
Finca was published by the following:

- Albi
- Devir
- Filosofia Édition
- Giochi Uniti

== See also ==
- Finca
