= Isle of Skye: From Chieftain to King =

Tile-laying board game

- Box cover
- Designers: Alexander Pfister, Andreas Pelikan
- Illustrators: Klemens Franz
- Publication: 2015; 11 years ago
- Players: 2–5
- Playing time: ~60 minutes
- Age range: 8+

Isle of Skye: From Chieftain to King is a tile-laying board game designed by Alexander Pfister and Andreas Pelikan that was published in 2015. It uses the Isle of Skye as its setting, with players representing clan chieftains each vying to build a kingdom.

== Gameplay ==
Each player assumes the role of a clan chieftain with the goal to expand their realm and starts with a castle, shield, a scoring token, and an income of 5 gold coins. Three landscape tiles are drawn and arranged in front of the upright shield. Behind the shield, an ax token is placed adjacent to the landscape tile the player intends to discard, and at least 1 gold coin is placed adjacent to each of the other two tiles; this represents the price the player associates to that tile. Once everyone has completed this step, the players remove their shield, revealing their choices. This phase of the game is typically very quick.

The auction phase begins, proceeding clockwise from the starting player, with each player able to purchase one of the landscape tiles from an opposing player at the price established by the opposing player. To end the round, any landscape tiles remaining in front of a player must be purchased by the player. All purchased landscape tiles are placed in the player's clan territory, with the restriction that landscapes must match on the edges of abutting tiles.

Scoring for each round is based on a randomly determined set of criteria. These are established by four scoring tiles drawn randomly from the set of 16 and assigned in order to the slots marked 'A', 'B', 'C', and 'D' on the scoring board. The first round is scored according to the criteria on the tile in position 'A', the second round on the tile at position 'B', and so on for later rounds.

At the end of the game, each player receives victory points for each tile in their clan territory containing a scroll icon. These award 1 victory point each for broch, cattle, farm, lighthouse, each pair of sheep, each pair of ships, and each pair of whiskey barrels. These award 2 victory points if they occur in a completed area. Finally, 1 victory point is earned for every five gold pieces. If there is a tie, the player with the most leftover gold pieces wins.

== Expansion sets ==
The 2017 Isle of Skye: Journeyman expansion set adds new player boards modifying the auction phase, and a pawn for each player that traverses the player's kingdom to activate tiles.

A mobile app version of the game was scheduled for release by Digidiced in early 2018.

== Reception ==
Andy Matthews, in a review for Meeple Mountain, states that the game has simple mechanics with a "colorful and detailed" design that is "clever and well balanced". Writing for T3, Matthew Bolton stated that the game is reminiscent of Carcassonne.

In his list of "Best 15 board games for adults in 2021" for GamesRadar+, Benjamin Abbott states that Isle of Skye: From Chieftain to King is "one of the most enjoyable board games for adults".

== Awards ==
It also received the Board Game Quest Award for "Best Strategy/Euro Game". The UK Games Expo awarded it the Best Boardgame in 2016.

Isle of Skye: From Chieftain to King won the 2016 Kennerspiel des Jahres. This was the second successive year the design team of Andreas Pelikan and Alexander Pfister won the Kennerspiel, following the 2015 Kennerspiel des Jahres won for the game Broom Service.
