= Enchanted Forest (game) =

Board game

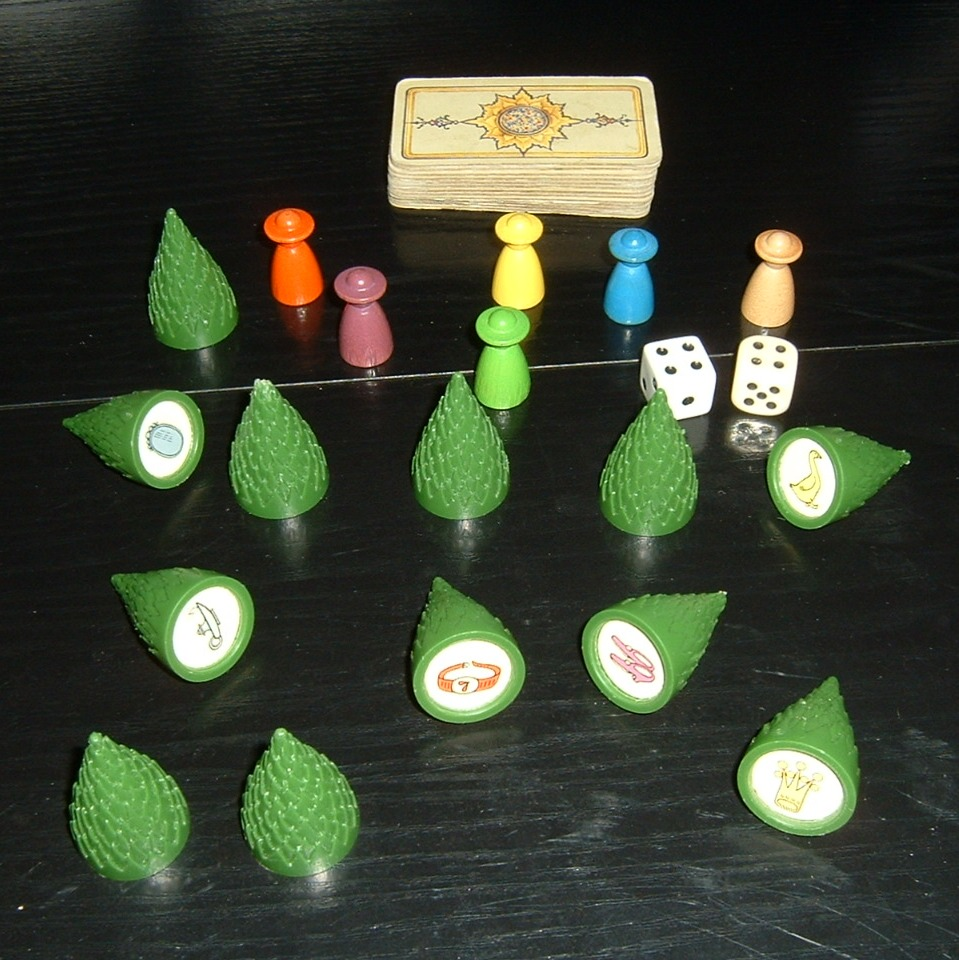
- Playing pieces from the original Sagaland (1981)
- Players: 2-6
- Playing time: 30-60 minutes

Enchanted Forest is a board game designed by Alex Randolph and Samuel Etchie in 1981, that requires players to remember the locations of fairytale treasures. The first edition of the game was published by Ravensburger in Germany in 1981 under the original name Sagaland.

== Gameplay ==
Before gameplay commences, the scene is set by a king wanting to find an heir to the throne, as in his old age, he has borne no children. Through the years, he has heard about the magical and mythical treasures that lie hidden in the Enchanted Forest below his large castle. He, therefore, proclaims that whoever finds three of these treasures for him will succeed him. From here on in, gameplay begins.

The board consists of a village (the starting place), the Enchanted Forest itself, and the castle to which players will reveal hidden treasures to the king. Each space is a circle and, depending on the edition of the game, the trees that contain pictures of the treasures on their bottom faces will be placed at specifically coloured circles (generally blue or noted by a tree symbol). There are a maximum of six playing pieces, and each treasure depicted on the bottom of the thirteen trees corresponds to a card. These thirteen cards are placed face downward at the castle, except the top card (the treasure the king is currently seeking), which is face up.

Movement is focused around throwing two dice. According to the general rule, each dice throw outcome is considered a separate move. For example, a 5 and 3 could be consider as either 8 in one direction, or 5 in one direction and 3 in the other. As each player throws the dice, their aim is to land on a circle that corresponds to a tree. Once a player lands on that space by the end of their move, they may look under the tree and must remember the treasure found there.

Once a player knows where the currently sought treasure is, they should make his way to the castle. By landing on another specific circle, that player can then guess where the treasure is. If correct, the player keeps the top card, and the next is turned over. However, if wrong, the player must replace the tree and immediately return to the village.

Once a player gains three treasure cards, that player wins, and the game is over.

== Editions ==
=== Sagaland ===
- 1981 - Sagaland (German)
- 1994 - Sagaland (German 2nd Edition)

=== Enchanted Forest ===
- 1982 - Enchanted Forest(English)
- 1986 - Den Förtrollade Skrogen (Swedish)
- 1987 - Enchanted Forest (English)
- 1990 - Enchanted Forest (English 2nd Edition)
- 1990 - Fabuleux trésors (French)
- 1994 - Enchanted Forest (English 3rd Edition)
- 1994 - Η Χωρα του Παραμυθιου (Greek)
- 1996 - Il Regno delle Fiabe (Italian)
- 1996 - Sprookjesland (Dutch)
- 1997 - The Wizard of Oz (English)
- 2007 - Efteling Sprookjesspel (Dutch 2nd Edition)
- 2010 - Sprookjesboom Spel (Dutch 3rd Edition)
- 2010 - Disney Rapunzel Enchanted Forest Game (English/German/French/Dutch/Italian/Spanish/Portuguese)
- 2014 - Filly Butterfly: Sagaland (French/German/Italian 3rd Edition)
- 2021 - Raya's Journey: An Enchanted Forest Game
- 2022 - Disney Princess Enchanted Forest Sagaland

== Reception ==
Alan R. Moon reviewed Enchanted Forest for Games International magazine, and gave it 4 stars out of 5, and stated that "Enchanted Forest is an example of elegant simplicity. It is a must for a gamer's collection."

== Awards ==
- Spiel des Jahres Recommended in 1981
- Spiel des Jahres in 1982
