= Camel Up =

2014 board game

Camel up
- Box cover of Camel Up
- Designers: Steffen Bogen
- Publishers: Pegasus Spiele
- Players: 2 to 8
- Setup time: 5 minutes
- Playing time: 30 minutes
- Chance: Medium
- Age range: 8 and up
- Skills: Strategy

Related games
- Wits and Wagers

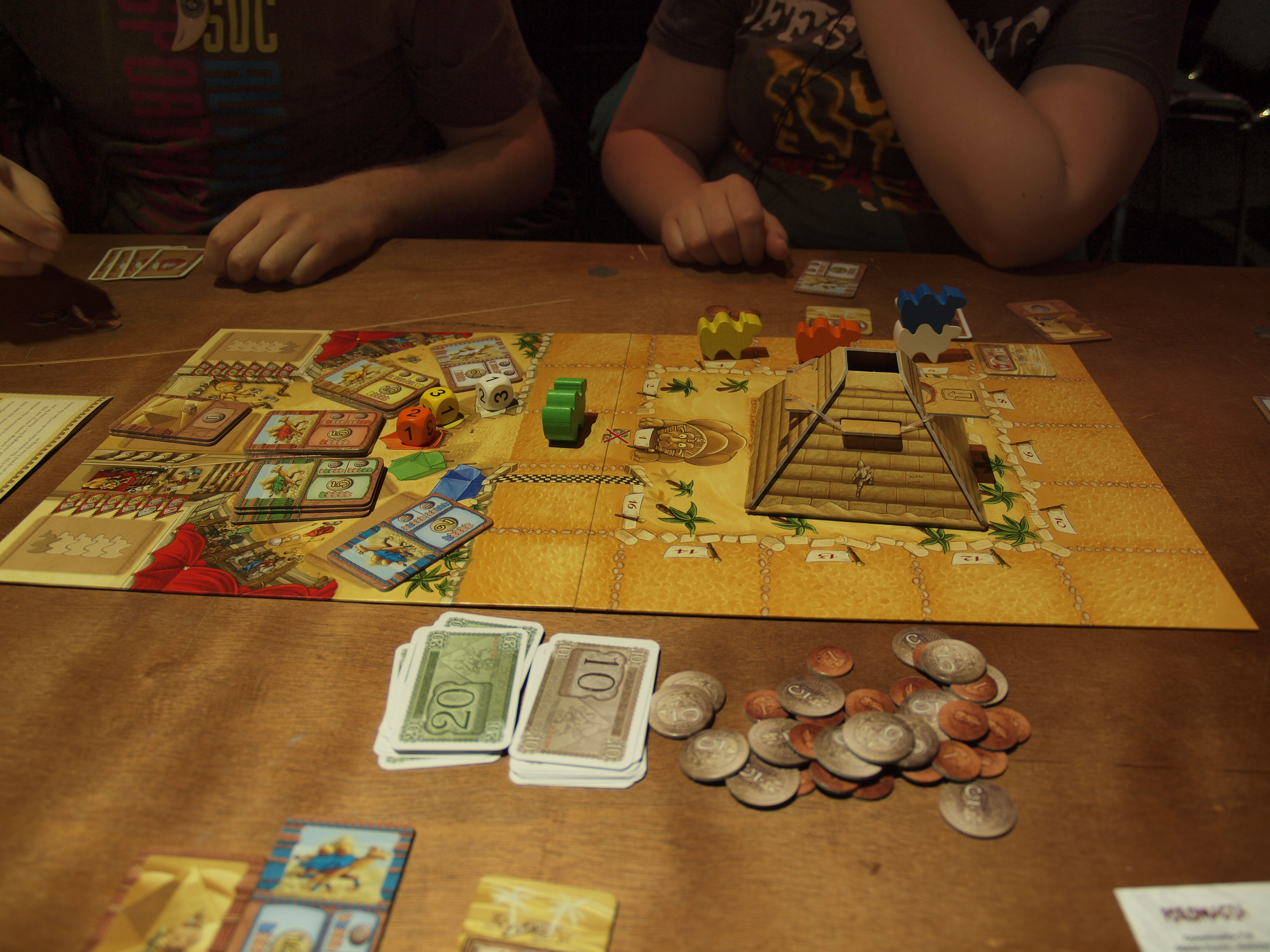
A game of Camel Up during play.

Camel Up is a board game for two to eight players. It was designed by Steffen Bogen and illustrated by Dennis Lohausen, and published in 2014 by Pegasus Spiele. Players place bets on a camel race in the desert; the player who wins the most money is the winner of the game. Camel Up won the Spiel des Jahres in 2014.

In 2015, an expansion called Camel Up: Supercup was released, allowing the game to be played with up to 10 players. A mobile app was also released in 2015 for Android and iOS devices.

At Essen 2018, a German board game convention, Eggertspiele released a second edition of the game with new artwork by Dennis Lohausen and Chris Quilliams, and revised game rules.

In 2021, a spinoff called Camel Up: Off Season was released.

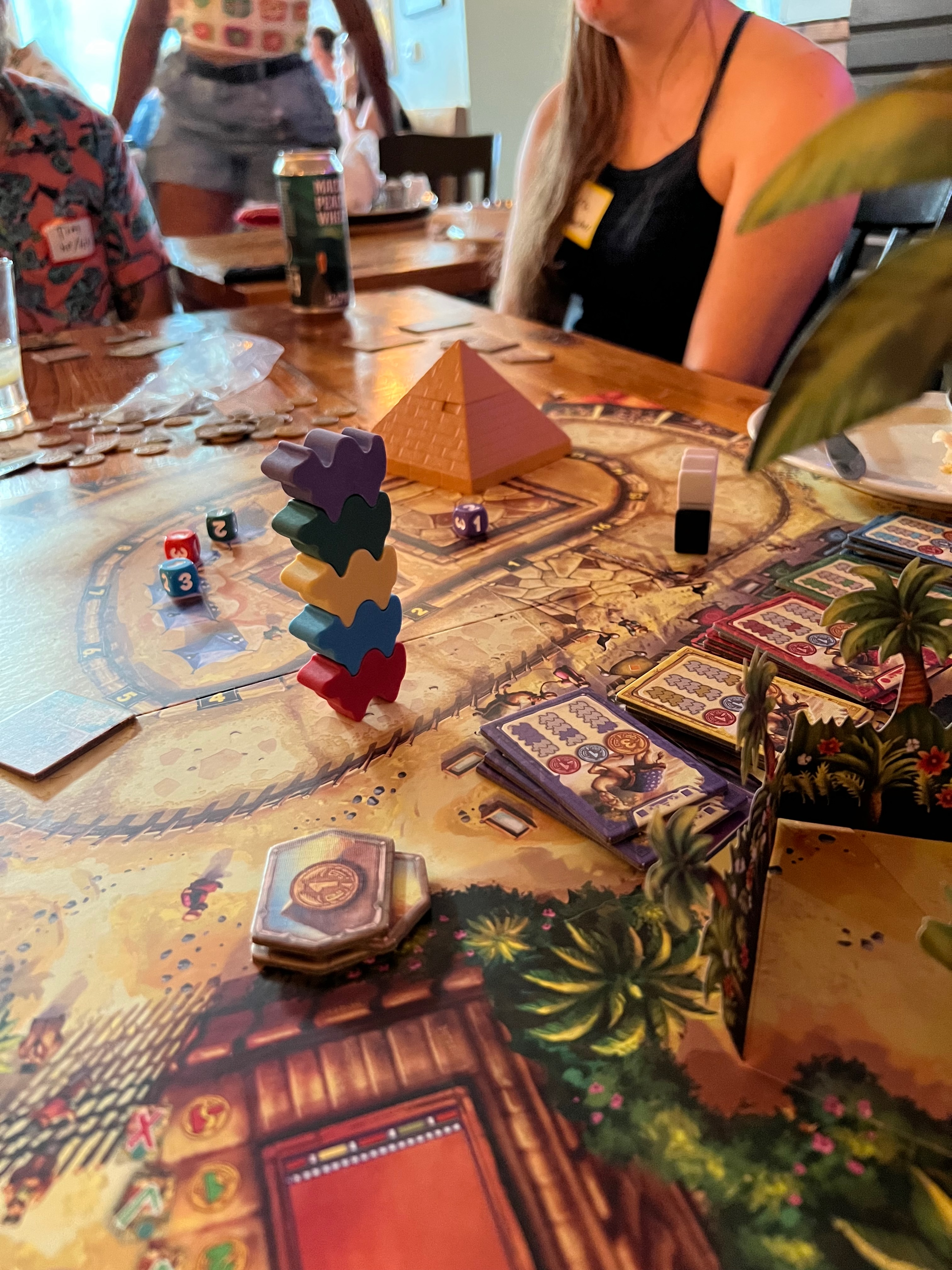
Second Edition game of Camel Up showing all competing camels stacked. Note oasis pop-up in right foreground.

== Awards ==
- 2014 Spiel des Jahres winner
