= Um Reifenbreite =

Board game

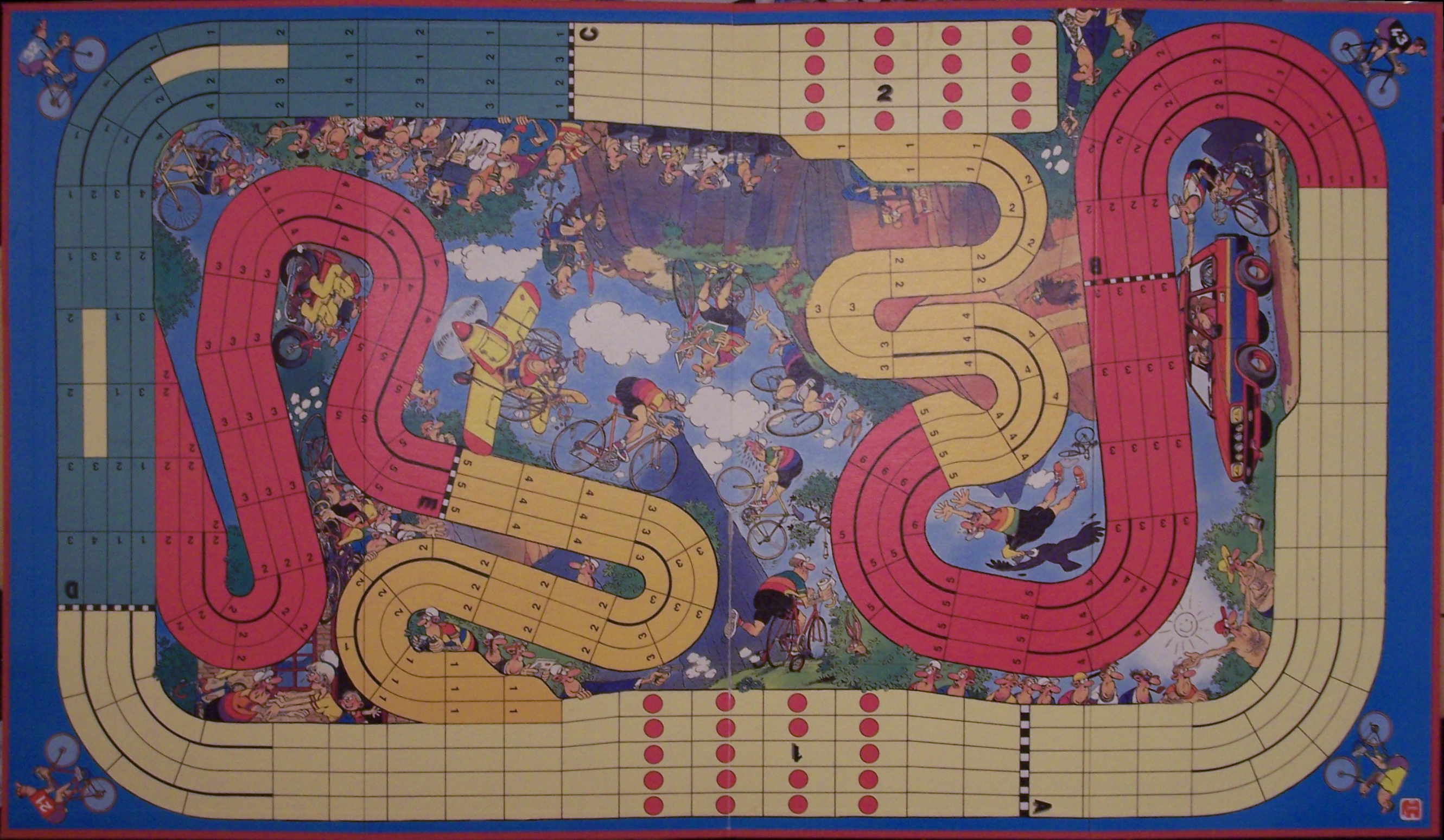
- Designers: Rob Bontenbal
- Illustrators: Jan van Haasteren
- Publishers: Jumbo Games
- Players: 2 to 4
- Playing time: 60 minutes
- Age range: 8 years and up

Um Reifenbreite is a bicycle racing themed board game for two to four players. It was invented by Rob Bontenbal.

== Awards ==
- Spiel des Jahres Game of the Year 1992
- Deutscher Spiele Preis 1992 2nd place

== Reviews ==
- Strategy Plus
