= Pictures (board game) =

2019 board game

- Box cover
- Designers: Daniela and Christian Stöhr
- Publishers: PD-Verlag; Rio Grande Games
- Players: 3 to 5
- Playing time: 20 to 30 minutes
- Age range: 8 and up

Pictures is a 2019 designer board game by Daniela and Christian Stöhr. It won the 2020 Spiel des Jahres.

In the words of T3 magazine, players "recreate an artsy picture using a bunch of weird components".

== Reception ==
The game won the 2020 Spiel des Jahres. The jury stated that "Each set provides the player with a different challenge and so there is a huge incentive for experimentation." The reviewers additionally praised the engagement and described the materials as "chosen cleverly".
