= Village (board game) =

Board game released in 2011

Box Cover of Village

Village is a historical-themed euro-style board game with a focus on resource management for 2-4 players, released in 2011. It is designed by Inka Brand and Markus Brand.

The game won the 2012 Deutscher Spiele Preis and Kennerspiel des Jahres awards.

== Gameplay ==
In Village, players control the fate of a family and oversee their rise to prominence in their local village. Players begin the game with 4 family members and must manage resources, time, and the actions of other players to score the most ‘prestige points’ to win the game.

The concept of death plays a major part in Village, with time being a spendable commodity. After spending a certain amount of time, players must choose a family member to pass away, beginning with their ‘oldest’ family members. Upon dying, family members are either immortalised in the village chronicle (which awards prestige points) or buried in anonymous graves.

Each round of Village, a limited and varied number of resource cubes are placed on each of the game’s action spaces. Players take turns to pick up a cube and perform the corresponding action. The following actions are available:

- Family - the player may add another family member to his supply. A total of 11 family members may be achieved throughout the game
- Crafts - the player may spend time and resources to craft different goods which benefit the player in different ways
- Grain Harvest - the player is awarded with bags of grain, the number dependent on which goods he has
- Market - all players may sell any goods/grain they have to customers at the market for prestige points
- Church - the player can send a family member to the village church, potentially being awarded prestige points for doing so
- Council Chamber - the player may place a family member in the council chamber. This costs goods and time but awards prestige points and other rewards
- Travel - the player can send a family member travelling to nearby villages. This costs goods, time and resource cubes but can yield prestige points and other rewards
- Well - a miscellaneous action that can be performed at any time. Players can pay 3 identical resource cubes to perform any of the above listed actions

The game ends once either all the spaces in the village chronicle are occupied or all the anonymous graves are filled. The players tally up their prestige points from their various activities with the highest score winning the game.

== Expansions ==
In 2013, the first expansion for the game was released - Village: Inn. The expansion adds two new buildings to the game. The brewery allows players to craft a new type of goods, beer, while the inn allows players to influence villagers by spending beer or coins. 30 unique villager cards are included in the expansion, each with a different ability that benefits the player. The expansion also includes new customer tiles and the components to allow for a 5th player, alongside additional game pieces to accommodate the extra player.

In 2014, the second expansion for the game was released - Village: Port. The expansion replaces the travel action of the base game with a new action, sea travel. Upon activating the action, players can send their family members on ships to explore various islands. The players can then sell domestic goods, acquire foreign commodities, and dig up treasure chests. The expansion includes 15 unique captain cards who players must hire to pilot their ships. 4 new maritime-themed villager cards are included when combining both expansions. The expansion also includes new ‘life goal’ cards. Players are dealt two life goal cards at the beginning of the game and rewarded prestige points if they meet the requirements of the card at any point.

Multiple promos have also been released for the game:

- In 2012, a promo was released that adds 4 unique customer tiles to the base game
- In 2014, a second promo was released that adds 4 more unique customer tiles. One must be used in conjunction with Village: Inn and another with Village: Port
- In 2014, a promo was released that contained extra tiles for 5 popular board games. For Village, the tile was a unique treasure chest to be used with the Port expansion
- In 2019, a multi-game promo entitled ‘Super Power’ was published by board game publisher Pegasus Spiele. The promo consists of 30 cards, one for each game, and bestows on the owner a once-per-game special ability. However, the promo comes with the caveat that once the owner uses the card, they must gift it to another player in real life to be used in a future game. The card for Village allows the owner to pick up a plague cube without having to lose time

== Village: Big Box (2023) ==
In June 2022, it was announced that Village: Big Box would be released in early 2023. The Big Box edition includes the base game, both major expansions, and all released promos. In addition, the edition includes a new ‘Marriage’ expansion which introduces new tools and actions and allows a player’s family members to get married for extra bonuses. It also introduces a new solo mode with additional materials to support this.

Village: Big Box allows players to easily combine all extra material with the base game. This edition also features a new board design and completely new artwork, the latter of which sparked significant controversy among fans.

== Music ==
Viktor Schulz, an editor at Eggertspiele, a board game publisher which published Village, composed a song for the game. Published on YouTube, he describes it as 'the official song' for Village.
