= K2 (board game) =

Polish board game

- Designers: Adam Kałuża
- Illustrators: Jarek Nocoń
- Publishers: rebel.pl
- Publication: 2011
- Players: 1–5
- Setup time: approx. 5 minutes
- Playing time: 30–60 minutes
- Chance: Low
- Age range: 8 years and up
- Skills: Hand management
- Website: Rebel.pl page

K2 is a board game by Adam Kałuża in which players are challenged to climb the mountain of the same name. In 2012 K2 became the first Polish game to be nominated for a Spiel des Jahres award. It was also nominated for an International Gamers Award.

The game features a double-sided board with one side representing an easy ascent and the other a more difficult climbing route. There are also two types of weather conditions that you can use for the climb. This means there are four combinations of weather and board to set the game's difficulty level.

Each player has two climbers and gains points for the highest position that each one reaches as long as they survive. Players must maintain a minimum level of acclimatisation for each climber to ensure that they do not die on the mountain. This, along with movement up or down the mountain, is controlled by the playing of cards from each player's personal deck.

K2 can be played solo or with up to five players. When there are a number of climbers there is some level of interaction between players due to the limited space on the board. Each position has a stated number of climbers that can stop there meaning that it is possible to block the path upwards or downwards of opposing players.

The game has been praised for the emotional response it gains from players, including "moments of extreme tension". Reviews note that the theme of mountaineering is unique and interesting, while the game mechanics simulate climbing, with realistic scenarios. The variable difficulty level has received positive comments but the replayability of the game has been questioned.

Rebel.pl have released K2: Broad Peak as an expansion for K2. This gives players two challenges based on historical climbs of Broad Peak (formerly known as K3) by Polish mountaineers. They also produced a small expansion called The Avalanche. Kałuża's follow-up game, The Cave, debuted in 2013.
