= 2026 in games =

This page lists board and card games, wargames, miniatures games, and tabletop role-playing games published in 2026. For video games, see 2026 in video gaming.

== Deaths ==
Date	Name	Age	Notability
January 19	Jean Rabe	68	American novelist and tabletop game writer
June 1	John Blanche	77	British fantasy and science fiction illustrator for Games Workshop
November 4	Pierre Rosenthal	65	French role-playing game designer
November 15	Ken St. Andre	79	American fantasy game designer and author, best known for creating the fantasy role-playing game Tunnels & Trolls (T&T)
