= Magician's Kitchen =

Magician's Kitchen is a 2010 board game published by Drei Magier Spiele.

== Gameplay ==
Magician's Kitchen is a game in which players guide wobbling apprentice pawns across a booby‑trapped board to deliver magical ingredients to cauldrons and ultimately ignite the central fire, all while hidden magnets create unpredictable, chaotic stumbles.

== Reviews ==
- Black Gate
- Świata Gier Planszowych #25 (as "Mali uczniowie czarnoksiężnika")
