= Cascadia (board game) =

2021 board game

- Box cover
- Designers: Randy Flynn
- Illustrators: Beth Sobel
- Publishers: Flatout Games
- Publication: 2021
- Players: 1-4
- Playing time: 30-45 minutes
- Website: www.flatout.games#/cascadia/

Cascadia is a 2021 board game designed by Randy Flynn and published by Flatout Games. In Cascadia, players draft and add habitat tokens and matching wildlife tokens to score victory points based on various scoring conditions. Upon its release, Cascadia received critical success, with reviewers praising its components, accessibility, and strategy, but also noting its lack of player interaction. Cascadia won the 2022 Spiel des Jahres and the 2023 International Gamers Award for the Best solo game.

== Gameplay ==
In Cascadia, which is set in the Cascadia region of the Pacific Northwest, players select one of the four available combinations of habitat and wildlife tokens to add to their existing habitat tokens. If three or four wildlife tokens are identical, players may choose to replace the four wildlife tokens with new ones. Habitat tokens must be placed adjacent to an existing habitat token, whereas a wildlife token is placed on a habitat token with the matching terrain. After each turn, habitat and wildlife tokens are replenished; once all habitat tokens are used, the game ends, and players earn points based on contiguous habitat tile corridor groups and varying wildlife scoring cards with different scoring goals for each wildlife depending on their behaviour. For example, victory points are rewarded for bears if their wildlife tokens are grouped together, but foxes gain victory points based on a combination of prey species. The game also has additional scenarios and minor goal alterations.

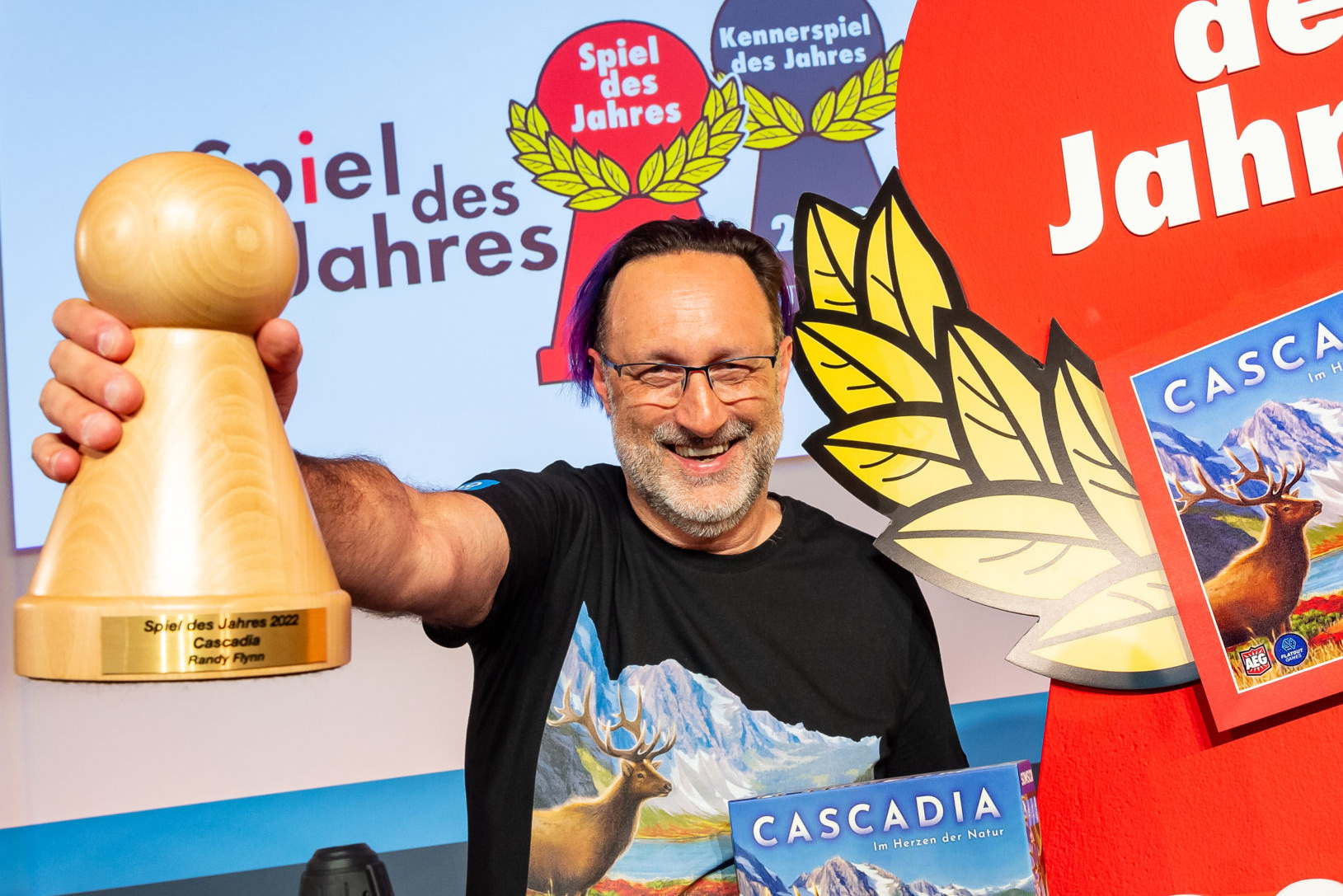
Randy Flynn in 2022

== Reception ==
Upon its release, Cascadia received critical success. Matt Thrower from IGN described the components as "simple", but praised the art, the simplicity of the rules, engagement, and replayability offered from the scenarios and goal alterations, arguing that "[these] offer fantastic variety and add a particular spice to solo play". However, he criticised the lack of player interaction. Reviewing from Paste Magazine, Keith Law considered it to be one of the best games of 2021, praising the combination of strategy, ease of play, replayability, solo mode, and the campaign-like scenarios. Similarly, a review from Tabletop Gaming also commented positively on the artwork, the strategy from the "exquisitely enjoyable puzzle experience", accessibility, and solo mode, but was critical of the lack of player interaction and downtime at higher player counts. The review also compared it to Calico, and described that it was "a little easier on the brain and therefore a tad more chilled". The game also appeared on a list of best 2022 games from Polygon, with the reviewers complimenting its components, replayability, and strategy due to a variety of ways to victory from "[creating] corridors, focusing on area control, and cornering endgame bonuses". Cascadia subsequently won the 2022 Spiel des Jahres, with the jury stating that "[the] two-part puzzle is especially successful, requiring players to find a good balance between matching landscape tiles and playing the right animal symbols. The modular rule cards give the game a high level of replayability, presenting players with new challenges every time, as well as an optional campaign mode". The game placed second in the 2022 Deutscher Spiele Preis.
