= Heinz Meister =

German board game designer

Heinz Meister is a prolific board game designer from Germany. He is credited as the designer of over 150 board games or game items. Only a few game designers from Germany such as Reiner Knizia, Wolfgang Kramer, and Michael Schacht are known to have more tabletop game design credits. Meister won the Kinderspiel des Jahres award for best children's game in 1995 with Karambolage and in 1992 for Galloping Pigs.
