= Just One (board game) =

2018 board game

- Standard edition box
- Designers: Ludovic Roudy, Bruno Sautter
- Illustrators: Éric Azagury, Florian Poullet
- Publishers: Repos Production
- Publication: 2018
- Players: 3-7
- Playing time: 20 minutes
- Age range: 8+

Just One is a cooperative party game for 3 to 7 players, designed by Ludovic Roudy and Bruno Sautter, illustrated by Éric Azagury and Florian Poullet, and published by Repos Production. In each round of the game, players write down a one word clue for the round's guesser. They must then attempt to guess the secret word based on the submitted clues with identical ones removed. Released in 2018, the game has been nominated for numerous awards.

== Gameplay ==
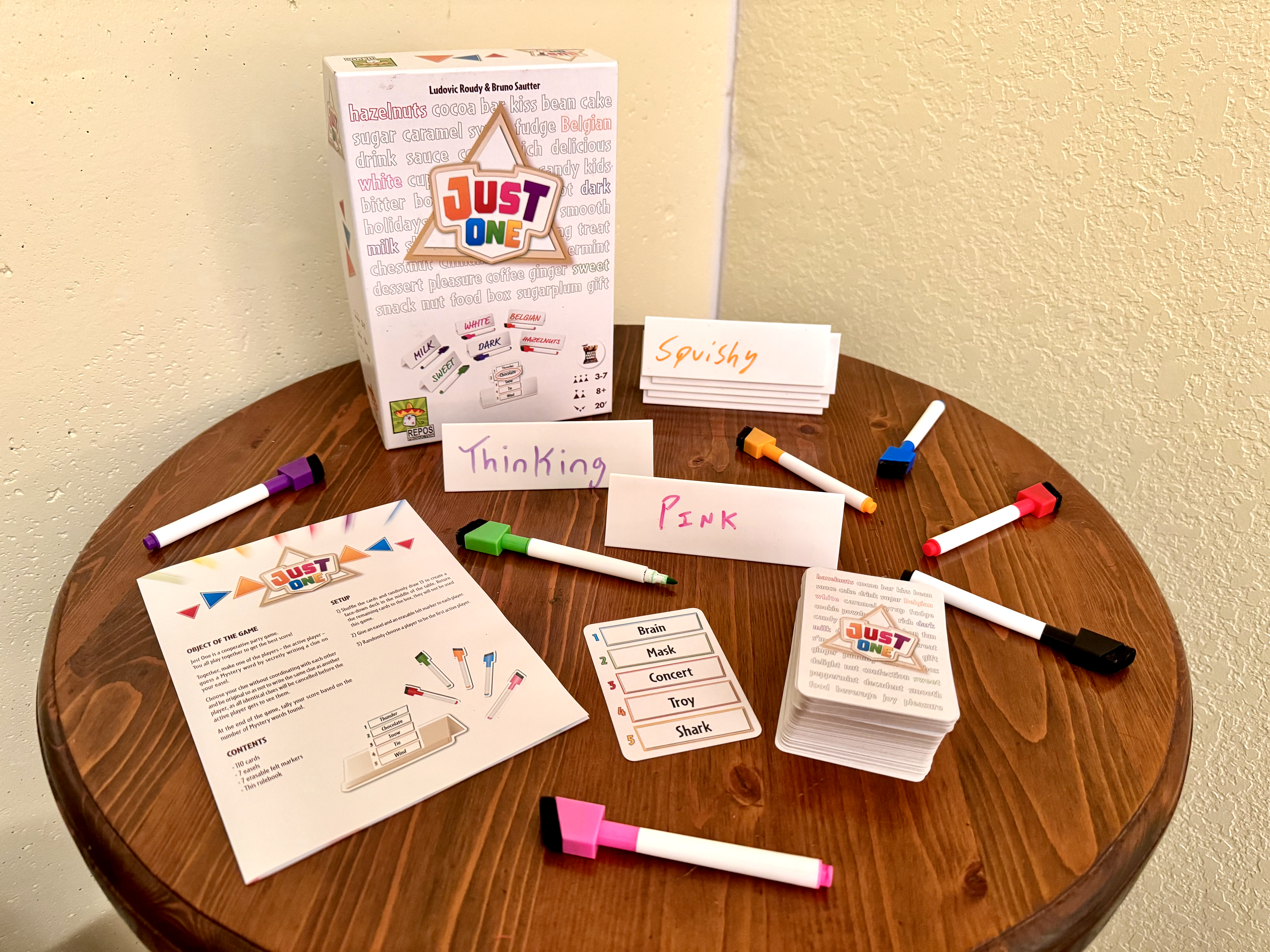
Game components

An example Just One round, with reasons for rejecting some clues for the word "Credit"

Just One is a cooperative board game for three to seven players. 13 cards are drawn before each game, forming the deck. On each round, one player is made the guesser, drawing a card, and, without looking at it, naming a number from one to five, which correspond to different keywords. All other players then read the chosen word and write one one-word clue on their whiteboard, hidden from others' views. All clues are revealed at once, with exact duplicates and very similar words being excluded.

The guesser then attempts to guess the keyword based on the clues shown to them. If the guess is correct, the group gains one point, while an incorrect guess leads to the next card in the deck being discarded. The guesser may also pass, proceeding to the next round without risking a discard or gaining any points. Whichever the case may be, a new round then begins, with a new player being made guesser. The game ends immediately if the deck is empty. The highest possible score is therefore 13 points.

== Development and release ==
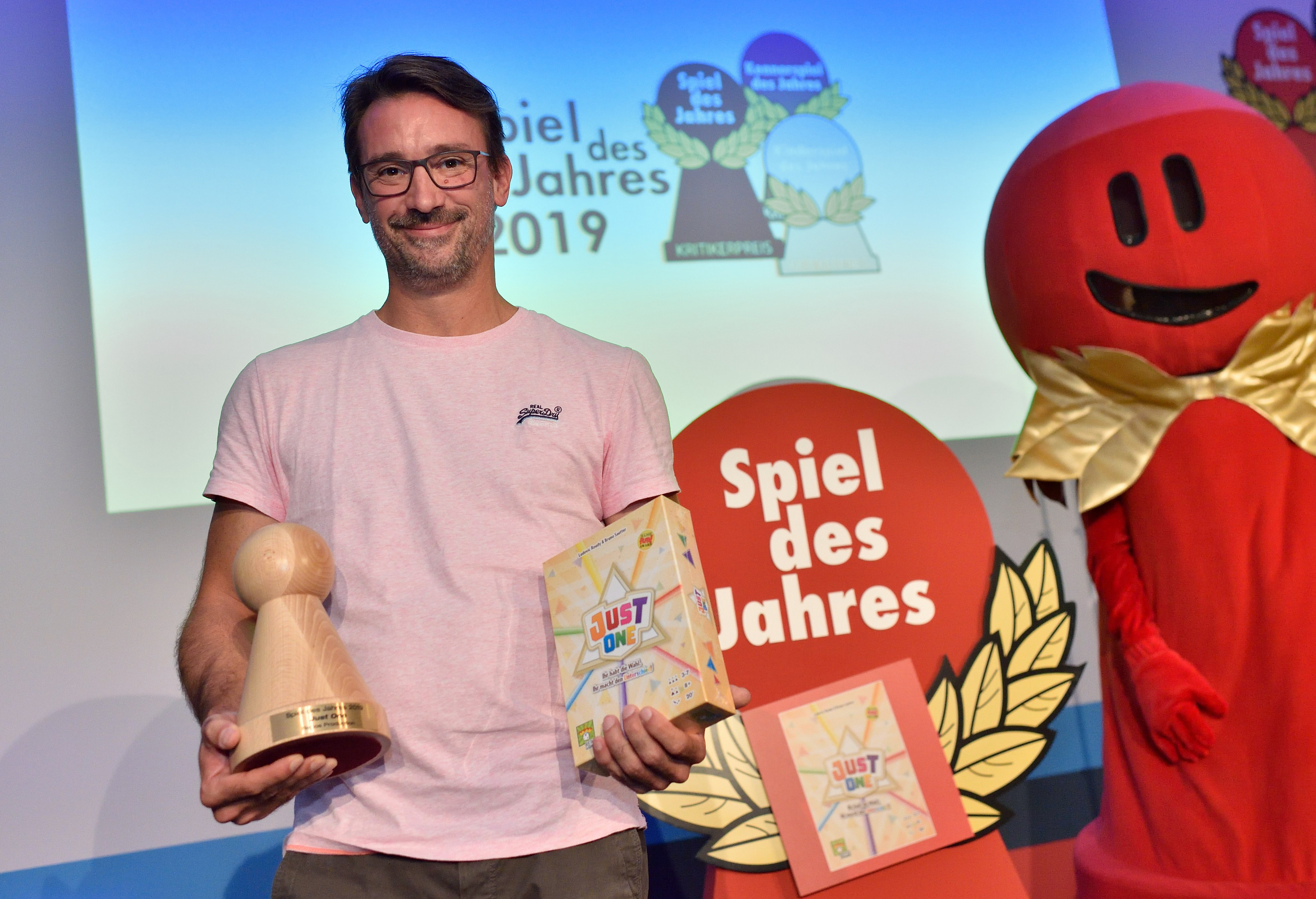
Sautter holding a copy of the game

Just One was created by designer duo Ludovic Roudy and Bruno Sautter, best known for the 2017 exploration board game The 7th Continent, which was received favorably. Artists Éric Azagury and Florian Poullet, who had previously worked on award-winning guessing game Concept, illustrated the game's cards and box art. Repos Publishing, a subsidiary of Asmodee, began releasing the game in 2018.

Sautter claimed that the motivation behind creating Just One was to make a game that "was so easy to learn that even his own mother-in-law would be fun". (Note: German: "das so einfach zu erlernen sei, dass es sogar seiner eigenen Schwiegermutter Spaß machen würde")

== Reception ==
The game received positive reviews from critics.

=== Awards ===
Just One has received nominations for numerous awards since its release. Some notable ones are below.

Year	Award	Category	Result	Ref.
2018	Golden Geek Awards	Best Cooperative Game	Nominated	
2018	Golden Geek Awards	Best Party Game	Nominated	
2019	Spiel des Jahres	Game of the Year	Won	
2019	International Gamers Award	General Strategy: Multi-player	Nominated	
