= Gift Trap =

Party board game

- Box cover of Gift Trap
- Players: 3-8
- Setup time: Approx. 5 minutes
- Playing time: 45-75 minutes
- Chance: Low
- Age range: 8 years and up
- Skills: Empathy, Intuition, Honesty, Memory, Social Intelligence & Emotional Intelligence

Gift Trap is a 2006 indie party board game, invented by Nick Kellet (based on an idea inspired by his eldest daughter in 2004). Gift Trap is billed as "The hilarious gift-exchange party game". Gift Trap relies on the players' personal knowledge of each other, requiring the matching of the right gift to the right person.

== Gameplay ==
Game tokens

Cards are dealt to the table depicting different gift items. Players use face-down tokens to mark the gifts they would give to each of the other players, and which gifts they would like to receive themselves. Tokens are then revealed, and players score according to the correlation of gifting and reception tokens.

== Development ==
Madhouse Creative created the packaging and brand identity for the game. Images used for the gift cards in the game were licensed using a Creative Commons Attribution license; Crowdsourcing was used to collect images for use in the game via both a photo contest and through the use of online websites such as Flickr.com. Winners received a free copy of the game along with having their names included in the game.

Gift Trap donated one copy to the charity Right To Play for every ten copies sold from the first production run of 10,000 games.

== Reception ==
Gift Trap It won a Major Fun Party Award from Bernie DeKoven in September 2006, and was featured on CBC Venture's show Dreamers & Schemers in December 2006. Reviews by Tom Vasel, Bruno Faidutti, Scott Nicholson and Greg Schloesser helped create early awareness for Gift Trap in the run up to its first holiday season.

In 2007 Gift Trap won Party Game of the Year in France by Bruno Faidutti and Best New Party Game 2008 and placed in the Games 100 by Games magazine in the USA. In 2009 Gift Trap won the Spiel Des Jahres: Special award: Party Game.

Gift Trap has been translated into eight languages. In 2010 the game entered its sixth production run and added Chinese, Russian, Greek and Japanese editions.
