= Kingdomino =

Board game

- Designers: Bruno Cathala
- Illustrators: Cyril Bouquet
- Publishers: Blue Orange Games (2016)
- Players: 2–4
- Playing time: 15–20 minutes
- Chance: Moderate
- Skills: Strategy, tactics, logic

Kingdomino is a 2016 tile board game for 2-4 players designed by Bruno Cathala and published by Blue Orange Games. In this 15-20 minute, family-oriented game, players build a five by five kingdom of oversized domino-like tiles, making sure as they place each tile that one of its sides connects to a matching terrain type already in play. The game was critically successful and won the 2017 Spiel des Jahres award, and was followed by several spin-offs and expansions.

== Gameplay ==
Scoring a 141-point 5×5 Kingdomino grid with Middle Kingdom and Harmony rules (126 points without)

In the game, players take turns choosing domino-like tiles and adding them to their kingdoms. Like traditional Dominoes, each tile has one or two different ends, which in this case also show different landscapes, and possibly a number of crowns on it. Choosing a tile with the most crowns gives a player last choice in the next round for choosing a tile, and vice versa - choosing the worst tile now ensures the first choice in the following round.

In the Harmony variant, players using every tile score 5 extra points: this can occur only if the castle covers a black square above, leaving equal numbers of black and white squares (a tile covers one of each colour) as in the mutilated chessboard problem

When a tile is placed next to other tiles of the same landscape, they form a larger property. Each kingdom can be no larger than a 5x5 grid of landscapes. The game ends when the tiles run out, and then each property is scored based on how big it is, multiplied by the number of crowns in it. The player with the most points in all their properties wins.

There is also a two player variant of the game which allows players to form a larger 7x7 grid of tiles.

Kingdomino is considered by reviewers to be an accessible entry point into strategy board games, with its 15–20 minute playing time and its familiar game mechanics which bear similarity to Dominoes.

== History ==
The first version of Kingdomino was only available to families in the French Alps who paid for a week-long pass at the nearby ski resort.

== Reception ==
Kingdomino received positive reviews upon its release, and won the Spiel des Jahres award for the best board game of the year. In a 2017 article, The Guardian praised the combination of accessibility and depth of strategy, describing Kingdomino "the standout game of the past 12 months". Sam Desatoff IGN also praised the simplicity of rules, strategy and the engagement of the tile selection mechanic, stating that "every single fast-playing round into a mindgame of maximizing the points you can earn right now", but criticised the "analysis paralysis". A review in The Wirecutter praised the fun and engagement of the game, but criticised the interactivity and complexity of the rulebook.

== Spinoffs and expansions ==
In 2017, Blue Orange Games released Queendomino, a standalone board game which used a tile laying gameplay similar to the original, but added knights, dragons, a queen, and buildings to build. This was followed in 2018 by the release of Kingdomino Age of Giants, an expansion for both Kingdomino and Queendomino. In 2019, Kingdomino Duel was also released as a two player, roll and write version of the game. In 2021, a simplified version, Dragomino, was released, receiving positive reviews and won the Kinderspiel des Jahres award. Kingdomino Origins, a prehistoric-themed sequel, was released in the same year and introduced three modules. In 2025, a mobile and Steam video game based on the game is launched.
