= Broom Service (board game) =

Role selection board game

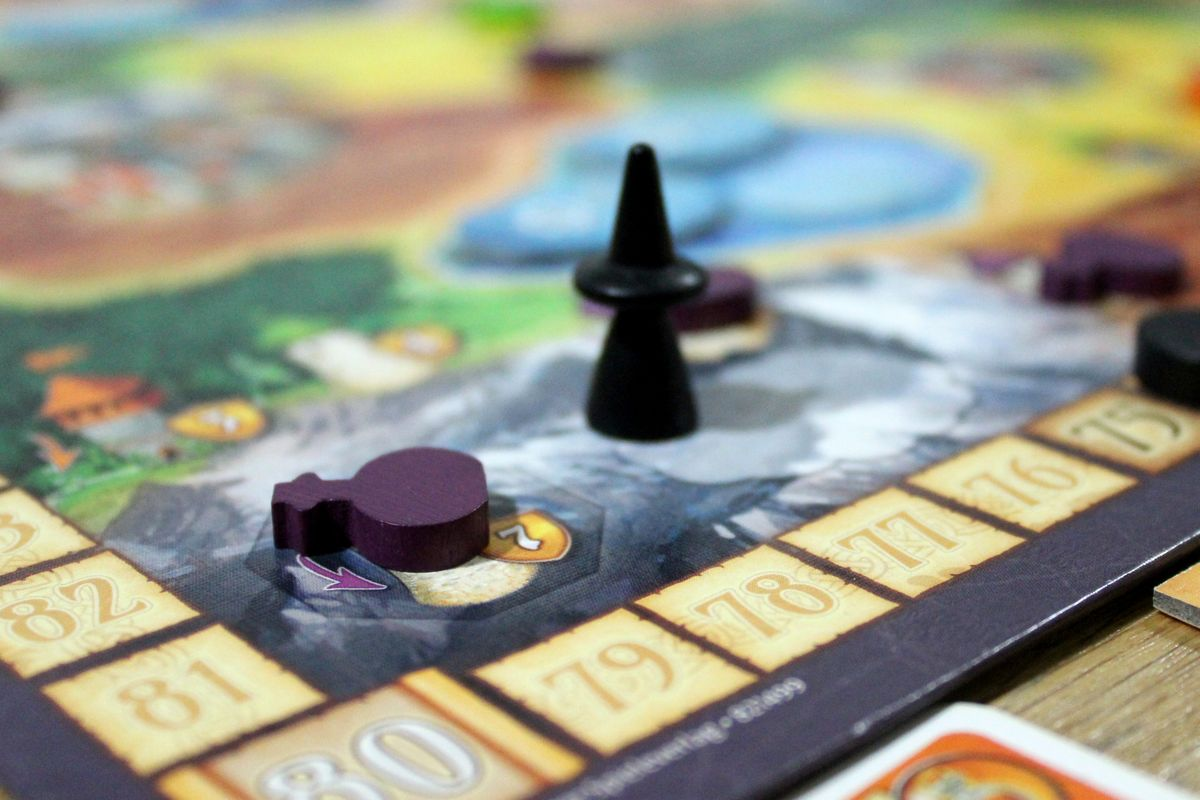
- A purple potion
- Designers: Andreas Pelikan and Alexander Pfister
- Illustrators: Vincent Dutrait
- Publishers: Ravensburger
- Publication: 2015; 11 years ago
- Players: 2–5
- Playing time: 30–75 minutes
- Age range: 10+

Broom Service is a role selection board game designed by Andreas Pelikan and Alexander Pfister, and published by Ravensburger. It won the 2015 Kennerspiel, the Spiel des Jahres connoisseurs game of the year award.

It is an adaptation of Pelikan's 2008 card game Witches' Brew. In 2016, a card game version was published as Broom Service: The Card Game.

== Gameplay ==
Players assume the role of druids, witches and potion gatherers. Each player receives an identical deck of 10 cards, each representing a role. A potion gatherer card allows the player to collect green, orange, or purple potions along the game board path. A witch card allows the player to move the player's pawn, and a druid card allows the player to deliver potions to a nearby tower of the same colour as the potion. Each card has a 'brave' and 'cowardly' option, which is chosen by the player when it is played.

There are seven rounds in a game, each of which has four turns and an event card that alters game play. Each round, players select four of their ten cards as their hand, and play occurs clockwise. The lead player of the round plays one of their cards and declares the option they have chosen. If the cowardly option is chosen, the player immediately takes the associated action, but if the brave option is chosen they must wait for other players to play their cards. Subsequent players may only play a card if it has the same name as the one played by the round's lead player, also declaring the option they have chosen; otherwise they pass their turn. The last player to play a card that turn and to declare the 'brave' option can perform the action associated with that option; all other players that chose 'brave' forfeit their action for that turn. This is repeated for each of the four cards in the hand for that round.

Players earn victory points by delivering potions to the towers, or by collecting clouds.

== Reception ==
In a review for Meeple Mountain, Kurt Refling states that the game is a "comfortable hour of scheming" and gave it his "highest recommendation".

In a review for Paste, Keith Law stated that the game was "visually appealing".
