= Reinhold Wittig =

German game designer (1937–2026)

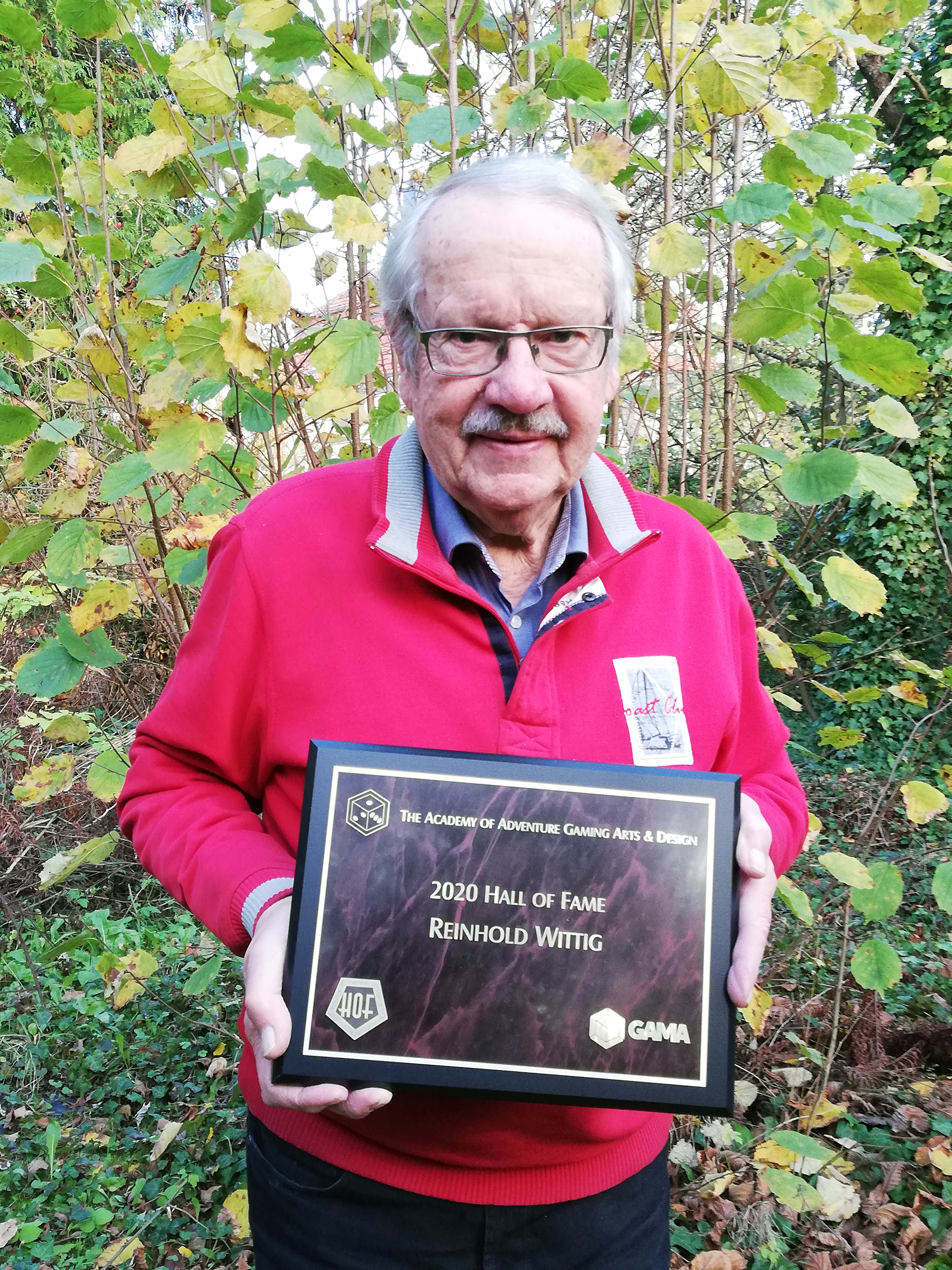
Wittig in 2020 holding the Academy of Adventure Gaming Arts & Design Hall of Fame Award

Reinhold Alex Wittig (2 January 1937 – 11 April 2026) was a German award-winning board game designer and geologist. He was credited as the designer of over 125 board games or game items.

Wittig was born in Göttingen on 2 January 1937 and died there on 11 April 2026, at the age of 89.
