= Arcs (board game) =

2024 board game

Conflict & Collapse in the Reach
- Designers: Cole Wehrle
- Illustrators: Kyle Ferrin
- Publishers: Leder Games
- Publication: 2024
- Genres: Space opera
- Players: 2-4
- Playing time: 60-120 minutes
- Chance: Medium
- Age range: 14+

Arcs: Conflict & Collapse in the Reach is a space opera board game designed by Cole Wehrle, illustrated by Kyle Ferrin, and published by Leder Games in 2024. In Arcs, players compete to gain the most points by fulfilling variable objectives, taking actions through a trick-taking system and using different dice to attack enemy starships, with each player possessing variable powers.

Following initial releases to Kickstarter backers, the base game and Arcs: The Blighted Reach Expansion, a large expansion which significantly modifies the base game into a three-act legacy campaign, were released to retail on October 1, 2024. The game received high praise on release.

== Gameplay ==
The base game of Arcs is a fast-paced strategy game set in the "Reach", an area of outer space. Players portray space faring societies, and attempt to win by obtaining galactic supremacy, gaining points by fulfilling various objectives called "ambitions", which include gathering resources from the various planets depicted on the board and waging war. Each game is played over five "chapters", or rounds, and begins with a randomized setup.

A large amount of gameplay revolves around trick-taking using action cards. This begins each round with one player, who has the 'initiative', leading by placing a card onto the table from their hand and taking actions based on the card's suit, and other players following based on the number on that card, sometimes being restricted into copying the same action as a result. Some cards allow more actions to be taken, with a base number of 1 actions per turn and extra actions allowed if resources, which are also used to score points, are spent. The player who leads is able to declare an ambition, determining how players score points in that round, but in doing so drops the number on their played card to zero, meaning that others can easily overtake them in the turn order. Available court cards enable players to customize their personal gameplay through individual powers, and can be stolen by other players.

Players fight with starship pieces which can be in three states; healthy, damaged or off the board, effectively allowing them two points of damage. Three types of dice are used for different types of attack on the board, with blue dice offering low damage but no risk, red dice being more aggressive but coming with significant risk, and orange dice which enable the theft of resources but at a high risk. The attacking player can choose to distribute damage among their own ships while concentrating damage on individual enemy ships, thus encouraging players to play aggressively.

=== The Blighted Reach Expansion ===
Arcs: The Blighted Reach Expansion is a day-one expansion of the base game which turns it into a three-session campaign with changing rules. At the beginning of the campaign, players are given a choice between two "fates", some of which introduce new systems to the game which affect all players and which can change between each game of the campaign if that player chooses to do so. The board state is retained between each game in the campaign. The full campaign is said to take about six hours of play and is designed to be replayed.

== Development ==
Wehrle has stated that after the completion of the design of his 2021 game Oath: Chronicles of Empire and Exile, he "was filled with all sorts of odd ideas that didn't fit into that game", and "wanted to stay in the space but design something new," making a more "narratively chunky" game. He was inspired by roguelike games.

Initially marketed during development as Arcs: Collapse and Conflict in the Void, the game was announced on October 3, 2021. At this point, Wehrle described it as a "short campaign game" playable in 2 to 4 sessions for 3 to 4 players and with a total run time of five hours maximum. In February 2022, Wehrle stated that the game would have "40 to 50" different objective cards to pursue, leading to "tens of thousands of different possible game states", including secret objectives, with the result of each game having a direct impact on the setup of the next.

On May 3, 2022, A Kickstarter campaign was scheduled for May 24 until June 14 that year, with shipment to backers estimated to begin in December 2023. Unlike Wehrle's 2018 game Root, players of Arcs were expected to have starting identities rather than asymmetric factions, and unlike Oath, the game world would be reset after three games of the campaign.

On May 17, 2022, Leder Games announced that it planned to separate the campaign section of Arcs from its replayable base game, instead marketing the campaign as an expansion; Wehrle cited potential future struggles in marketing Arcs as a big-box experience, as well as the need to provide an "arcade mode" for players to understand the game better before beginning an "overwhelming" campaign as the main reasons for this change. In doing this, the game could also be designed with the intention to add further expansions in the form of add-on modules by their other designers. He designed the campaign expansion as a "three-act structure", in which the acts were individual playthroughs that each flowed into the next game through analog "procedural generation". Wehrle intended for the game to operate in a similar way to games such as Twilight Imperium and Eclipse, though with significantly quicker games of 60–90 minutes.

The Kickstarter campaign earned over $532,000 in its first five hours when launched. In March 2023, while Arcs was in its early access development stage, Wehrle stated that the game would feature a two-player mode, requiring a restriction of the size of the map, alteration of how cards were drawn and change to how players gained resources and scored points. The game's full retail release was expected in September 2024, though it was eventually released on October 1 that year. On release the expansion unusually costed more than the base game, at $100.

== Reception ==
Arcs received high praise from critics. Rob Wieland of Forbes praised the game for its speed compared to Twilight Imperium, Eclipse and Star Wars: Rebellion. He remarked that the base game was "one that's stayed in the conversation with my friends long after we’ve tried it out," and compared the start of each game to "a Star Wars cold open", with players feeling as though they were "the head of a big space bureaucracy". Bell of Lost Souls compared the game to "if Warhammer 40,000 stopped pretending it wasn't as goofy and silly as it is" and called it a "space opera". In July 2024, Luis Aguasvivas of NPR listed Arcs as one of the best games of the year thus far. Polygon awarded it the Polygon Recommends badge, stating that its expansion was "completely over the top in all the best ways, and there's nothing yet released quite like it", and it was "a magnificent design that deserves recognition as one of 2024's best releases." Matt Thrower of IGN gave the game a 10/10 "masterpiece" rating, writing that the game was successful in its attempt to "balance challenging strategic elements with the classic fun of negotiation and dice-rolling", and that it was "an awesome thing to behold, carving a story arc of its own right through the annals of board game design". Smithsonian ranked it as one of the best board games of 2024, writing that "Arcs takes the sweep of grand space-opera-themed games like Twilight Imperium or Star Wars: Rebellion, but it lets players finish a round in an hour or two instead of 12".

== See also ==
- Root, Pax Pamir, John Company and Oath: Chronicles of Empire and Exile, other board games designed by Wehrle.
