= Kingmaker scenario =

Endgame situation in game theory

In game theory, a kingmaker scenario in a game of three or more players is an endgame situation where a player who is unable to win has the capacity to determine which player among others will win. This player is referred to as the kingmaker or spoiler. In competitive games, the kingmaker can leverage this ability to force a draw or can make game decisions to favor a player of their choosing. This situation can be undesirable in games where politics aren’t intended to determine a winner.

== Gladiator example ==
Consider this simple game: Three gladiators are playing, with strengths 3, 4, 5. In each turn, each gladiator must engage another, and they begin combat. The result of combat is that the weaker player is eliminated, and the stronger player loses strength equal to that of the weaker player. For example, if "5" attacks "3", "3" will die and "5" will have strength 2. The winning gladiator is the last one standing. Each round of combat eliminates one gladiator, so there will be two rounds of combat. The first round of combat will eliminate one participant and weaken the other to a strength no greater than 2. The nonparticipant's strength is at least 3, so they are guaranteed to win the second round of combat, and the entire contest. Therefore, the game collapses: The winning gladiator is the one not involved in the first battle. Hence, the gladiator whose turn comes first is the kingmaker. They must be involved in the first battle, hence cannot win, but with the liberty of choosing their opponent in that battle, can elect either of the other two players to be the winner of the contest.

== Forced stalemate ==
Consider a game with three or more players where there is a possibility of the game ending in a draw and for each player this outcome has greater utility than the game ending in their loss. Suppose two players reach an endgame where each player is capable of taking actions to win the game. However, a third player who is no longer capable of winning can take actions to prevent one of the other two players from winning but in doing so will effectively grant the win to the other player. This third player faced with no possibility of victory maximizes their utility by leveraging their role as kingmaker by proposing a deal that if any player does not agree to draw the game the kingmaker will allow their opponent to win, forcing all players into a situation where their outcomes are either to lose or draw. If both players decline, the player who would win first will win unimpeded so whoever is set to win second is incentivized to accept immediately thus placing the player set to win first into a situation where they are also incentivized to accept the draw. This situation is common in tournament play where regardless of specific rules, a draw if possible will almost always dominate a guaranteed loss by preventing the relative standing of opponents from increasing. This has parallels in peace negotiations where a treaty can be backed by the threat of involvement against the violator.

== In practice ==
Because they allow the outcome of the game to be determined by a player of (presumably) inferior strategy, kingmaker scenarios are usually considered undesirable, although to some extent they may be unavoidable in strategy games. Of course the argument can be made that this means the winner, chosen by the kingmaker, played with the additional restriction of not annoying the other players as much, presumably a more difficult task. In these games, the game mechanics, players' outcomes and strategies are often so interconnected that to eliminate all possibilities of this situation is almost impossible.

In tournament situations where, for instance, only a few teams proceed to the next round, a player who is already guaranteed to proceed can experience a situation similar to a kingmaker. They can sometimes influence which of the remaining players comes in second (when 2 players proceed). For such a player it can be profitable to make sure the weakest player proceeds, because this reduces their competition in subsequent rounds; however, this is often seen as undesirable because it conflicts with the concept that the strongest few are allowed to proceed to the next round. Different games deal with the kingmaker problem in different ways:

- In the 2002 board game Puerto Rico, players conceal their victory point totals. This makes it unclear (unless players are especially attentive) which player is in the lead.
- By introducing randomness, games can make sure that everyone in the game still has a chance of winning the game, no matter how bad their situation may be. Obscuring victory points can also accomplish this, for not knowing whether one can still win can have the same effect as still having a chance to win. For example, in the group stages of tournaments such as the FIFA World Cup, the final set of games in the group are often played at the same time. This results in fewer situations where one team has no chance of proceeding.
- Games can have rules that eliminate players who have no chance of winning the game, so they can not influence the game further (poker and Risk are examples of this).
- Games, especially in a tournament setting, can attribute value to places other than the first place. The potential kingmaker would be able to play for their own benefit even if they can no longer win. In the example of the gladiators, if the gladiator with strength 4 has to be involved in the first round, they will choose the gladiator with strength 3 as opponent instead of being indifferent.
- Most games prohibit—with penalties greater than match loss (for example, ostracism, disqualification)—questionable or unsportsmanlike conduct geared toward effecting a kingmaker scenario.
  - Stalling, or intentionally slowing game play in timed games, for personal advantage or to that of a currently leading player, is normally treated as unsportsmanlike conduct.
  - The use of revokes, or intentional rules violations, in trick-taking card games, to void a round and effect a kingmaker scenario is discouraged by use of severe penalties. In tournaments, doing this can be classified as cheating.
- In the later rounds of a Magic: The Gathering tournament, the rules permit a player to concede defeat for any reason other than bribery. Many players follow a practice of conceding to anyone who has a strong chance of winning one of the eight playoff spots, thereby avoiding as far as possible even the appearance of engaging in unsportsmanlike collusion with any party in preference over any other.
- In chess, the FIDE handbook recommends drawing lots such that players of the same national chess federation do not meet in the last few rounds. In the Candidates Tournament for example, players of the same national federation are made to play each other in the first round.
- In Catan, as resources can be freely traded between players, there are several scenarios where the traded cards may immediately lead to a player winning on their turn. The official Catan National Tournament rules section 1.1.5 states that "[the player is] prohibited from intentionally giving another player a win."

Other games may explicitly encourage a kingmaker scenario. An example of this is the television series Survivor, where the last seven to ten contestants voted out form a jury that chooses a winner from the final two contestants. Game designer Cole Wehrle has defended the practice of kingmaking, arguing that kingmaking offers a "powerful narrative tool". Wehrle argues that since the practice of kingmaking encourages players to consider their relationship with other factions in the game, it allows players to tell complex stories and consider the broader consequences of their actions—for instance, a player must consider whether betraying another faction would lead to that faction choosing another player to win later. Wehrle acknowledges that this goes against typical notions of fairness that are expected in games, but argues that storytelling may take precedence over fairness in some designs. Wehrle used these ideas in several of his designs, including Root, John Company, and Oath.

== See also ==
- Spoiler effect
