= Star Wars: Rebellion =

Star Wars: Rebellion may refer to:

- Star Wars: Rebellion (video game), a 1998 strategy game also known as Supremacy
- Star Wars: Rebellion (comics), a 2006 comic book series
- Star Wars: Rebellion (board game), a 2016 strategy board game

== See also ==
- Star Wars Rebels, a television series
- Rebel Alliance, the rebellion in the Star Wars universe
