= Return of a King =

2013 history book by William Dalrymple

Return of a King: The Battle for Afghanistan
- First edition cover
- Author: William Dalrymple
- Language: English
- Subject: First Anglo-Afghan War
- Genre: Nonfiction
- Publisher: Bloomsbury Publishing
- Publication date: 2013
- Publication place: United Kingdom
- Media type: Print (hardcover and paperback)
- Pages: 608
- ISBN: 978-1408818305
- OCLC: 846544925
- Preceded by: Nine Lives: In Search of the Sacred in Modern India

Return of a King: The Battle for Afghanistan is a 2013 history book about the First Anglo-Afghan War written by Scottish historian William Dalrymple and published by Bloomsbury.

== Background ==
During the making of the book, Dalrymple went to Kabul to make use of Afghanistan's national archives, local secondhand booksellers and remnants of private libraries abandoned by aristocratic owners. This allowed him access to epic poems composed immediately after the First Anglo-Afghan War. He used these sources to reconstruct insider accounts of Afghan leaders that are not generally known to British audiences.

== Summary ==
Return of a King is an account of the First Anglo-Afghan War, which was fought between the British East India Company and Afghanistan. The conflict resulted in the near complete destruction of an entire British army, with 4,500 British and Indian soldiers, plus 12,000 of their camp followers dying during a disastrous retreat. It was the first major conflict of the Great Game, a 19th-century competition for power and influence in Asia between the United Kingdom and the Russian Empire.

== Reception ==
Jason Burke of The Observer wrote, "Return of a King is perhaps the most directly relevant to the present day. The author spent time in both Afghanistan and Pakistan during its research and elaborates on the obvious parallels with the current situation," Barnaby Rogerson in The Independent says "Return of a King is not just an animated and highly literate retelling of a chapter of early 19th-century British military history, but also a determined attempt to reach out and influence the politicians and policy-makers of our modern world. The parallels between the disastrous British occupation of Afghanistan in 1839, and the post 9/11 occupation of Afghanistan by the US and some of its NATO allies, are so insistent that they begin to sound like the chorus of a Greek tragedy."

Rupert Edis in The Sunday Telegraph said: "As well as going deep into dangerous parts of Afghanistan and Pakistan to research his book, Dalrymple has recovered some remarkable new Afghan and Indian sources. We see beyond the stereotypes of treacherous Afghan 'fanatics' to the complex and remarkable individuals some of them were." Max Hastings in The Sunday Times described the book as "Dazzling... Dalrymple is a master storyteller, whose special gift lies in the use of indigenous sources, so often neglected by imperial chroniclers... Almost every page of Dalrymple’s splendid narrative echoes with latter-day reverberations." Cole Wehrle, designer of Pax Pamir, praised the book for its "gripping narrative style and incredible archival range".

However, Pakistani-British historian Farrukh Husain, writing in The Frontier Post, criticized the book for having an orientalist perspective and for not properly sourcing its claims.

== Awards and honours ==
Return of a King won the 2015 Hemingway Prize and the 2015 Ryszard Kapuściński Award. It was also a finalist for the 2013 Samuel Johnson Prize, the Duff Cooper Prize and the Hessell-Tiltman Prize.
