= Zenobia Award =

Award for historical board games

The Zenobia Award is an award given to board games with a historical focus that awards designers from underrepresented groups in the industry, including games by women, people of color, and LGBT people. The award was first founded in 2020 by a number of industry experts including board game designer Cole Wehrle and Dr. Christienne Hinz of Southern Illinois University Edwardsville, who is its director. It is named after Zenobia, a queen of the Palmyrene Empire who attempted to gain control of the Roman Empire.

== Organisation ==
Relevant entries must be tabletop games which “tackle some historical subject - political, social, cultural, scientific, economic, military, or other”. Contestants must come from underrepresented sociopolitical, cultural and gender groups or feature one member of their design team from one of these groups, and designs must be themed after a period of human history or tackle a political, social, cultural, scientific, economic or military topic. They must not require roleplay or a referee, they must be analog, and they must have a play length at or below two hours.

Finalists are selected by a blue-ribbon panel of experts in the tabletop game industry, including academics, journalists, and tabletop influencers. These have included co-designer of Twilight Struggle Jason Matthews, COIN wargame series creator Volko Ruhnke, and Oath: Chronicles of Empire and Exile and Pax Pamir designer Cole Wehrle. The finalists are then assigned a mentor and given access to resources and tools to improve their work before the winners are chosen. Each awards, eight finalists are selected from which three games are given the award. At its first inception, winners of the award received up to $4,000 in funding as well as direct publisher mentorship on their prototype of the game. The second edition of the awards offered a $1,000 cash prize as well as the same amount as a travel grant to a convention of their choice, with runners up receiving a $500 prize.

The award runs in accordance with its Derby House Principles which dedicate it to promoting inclusion and diversity in wargaming, helping underrepresented people into positions of power, and reassessing and improving its own apparatus according to community concerns.

== Impact ==
Multiple board games which competed in the first Zenobia awards have since been published, including Dutch Resistance: Orange Shall Overcome, Rising Waters, and Tindaya. As of November 2024, Molly House, Publish or Perish: Wiñay Kawsay, and Kartini: From Darkness To Light, all competitors, are also due to be published.

== Winners and finalists ==
Table key
‡	Indicates winners

Year	Game	Designer	Historical theme	Ref.
2021	Tyranny of Blood ‡	Akar Bharadvaj	Caste system in India (1700–1947)	
2021	Winter Rabbit ‡	Will Thompson	Cherokee economy and the Br'er Rabbit (early 16th century)	
2021	Wiñay Kawsay ‡	Alison Collins	Machu Picchu (1911–2012)	
2021	Molly House	Jo Kelly	Molly houses in London (early 18th century)	
2021	From Darkness to Light	Sherria Ayuandini	Indonesian independence movement (late 1800s-early 1900s)	
2021	Liberation - Haiti	Damon Stone	Haitian Revolution (1789–1794)	
2021	Orange Shall Overcome!	Marcel Köhler	Nazi occupation of the Netherlands (1940–1945)	
2021	The Season	Lauren Ino	Women in Regency era England (1811–1820)	
2024	The Porters ‡	Lucas Cockburn, Neco Cockburn, Alex Goss	Unionisation of Black porters on Canadian railways (20th century)	
2024	Silencio	Luis Salas	Missing family members due to Mexican cartels	
2024	Melaka: the Forgotten Empire	Effendy Norzaman	Sultanate of Melaka	
2024	Aguirre			
2024	House of Wisdom			
2024	Obraje			
2024	An Outstreched Hand			
2024	The Pursuit of Aguinaldo			
2024	Sabotage The Raj			
