= James Rattray =

British soldier and artist (1818–1854)

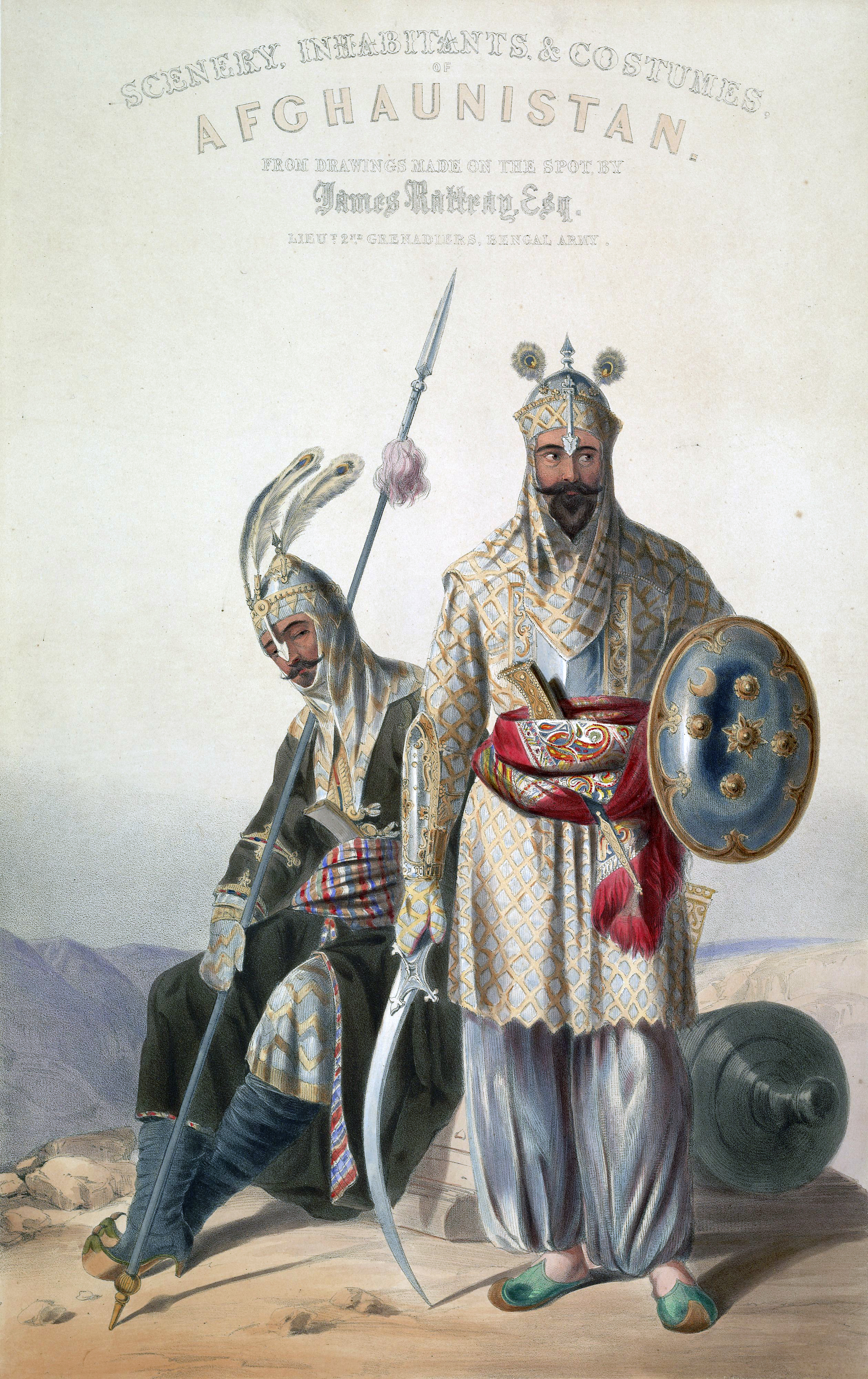
Frontispiece of his book Afghaunistan published in 1847

James Rattray (1818 – 24 October 1854) was a British soldier and artist.

At the time of making his notable sketches, he was a 2nd Lieutenant in the 2nd Grenadiers, Bengal Army, serving in Afghanistan.

== Early life ==
James Rattray was born in Daventry, Northamptonshire, England. His parents were Charles Rattray M.D. (1779–1835), a physician of Northamptonshire, and Mariane Freeman (1788–1866).

== Education ==
He had a good command of Persian and could speak directly with the local people.

== Career ==
Rattray began his career as a soldier. He was commissioned as a 2nd Lieutenant on 5 Dec 1838, the date he sailed out of Gravesend on the Severn, a West Indiaman bound for India. This ship was abandoned at sea (mid Atlantic) later that same year on 29 December 1838, with 16 ft. of water in her hold on a voyage from Miramichi in Canada for Bristol.

He followed and served alongside Charles Rattray (1810–1841), his older brother by 8 years, who was a Captain in the same period in Afghanistan.

He spent some time in the Hindustan. Rattray was part of a combined force known as the Army of the Indus. He was a Lieutenant in the 2nd Grenadiers, Bengal Army. He took part in the First Anglo-Afghan War, from 1839 to 1842.

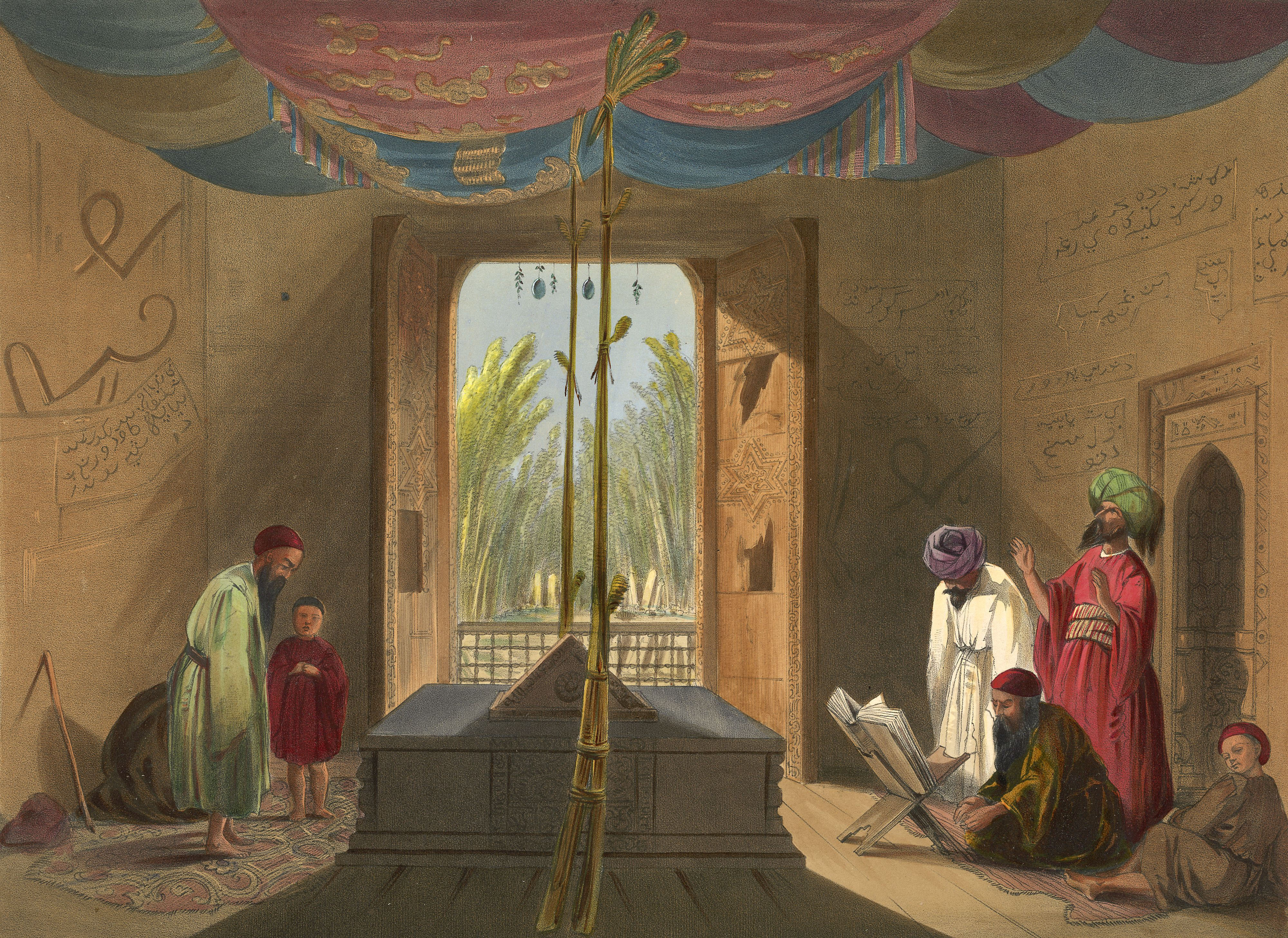
Tomb of Sultan Mahmud of Ghazni in 1839–40

He was in Ghazni in 1839–40. The picture, right, depicts the final resting place of Mahmud of Ghazni. The artist in Rattray was in love with this particular spot (Tomb of Sultan Mahmud of Ghazni) and viewed it as one of the most charming places in Afghanistan.

His brother, Lieutenant Charles Rattray, 20th N.I. (Native Infantry) acting as Major Eldred Pottinger's assistant, was assassinated on 3 November 1841 on duty at Lughmani, near Charikar, in the Kabul valley.

James was in Khandahar in December 1841.

He helped man the rearguard during the army's 1842 retreat from Kabul from Kabul to Peshawar. They entered the Khyber Pass from Jamrud. Their mission to take the fortress of Ali Masjid, popularly known as the Key of the Pass, which dominated the road and was garrisoned by Dost Mohammed's troops. Rattray had scarcely completed sketching, "when suddenly a report was heard, and, to my utter astonishment, walls and bastions composing the fortress blew up simultaneously in the air, like a whirlwind of sand; and so completely was it swept off from the summit of the mountain, that when the dense cloud cleared away not a vestige of the building remained."

Rattray undertook several tours of the region, after leaving the Army.

Another brother Captain Thomas Rattray (1820–1880) raised the 1st Bengal Military Police Battalion in April 1856, at Lahore, later re-named the 45th Rattray's Sikhs.

== Death ==
He died on 24 October 1854, at age 36, at Dorundah, Nagpore, India. On his death he was a Captain in the Indian Army. He died a bachelor, leaving no heirs. The executor of his estate was his brother Major David Rattray (1814–1874) of the Devonshire Militia, residing in Tiverton, Devon.

== Collections ==
His works are in the following collections:

- British Library
- National Army Museum

== Book ==
He is the author of Scenery, Inhabitants & Costumes, of Afghaunistaun from drawings made on the spot by James Rattray. Artist: James Rattray 1818–1854, Lithographer: Robert Carrick, Published by Day & Son in 1847. A second edition was published the next year in London: by Hering & Remington, 137 Regent street, 1848.

The artist dedicated this collection to the Kandahar Force that he belonged under the command of Major-General Sir William Nott, G.C.B., and the British and Indian Army officers who participated in the war.

His sketches and drawings were made into Lithographs mainly by the lithographer and engraver Robert C. Carrick. Other lithographers were Edmund Walker Plate nos. 2, 19, 20, 22, 24, and 25; landscape artist and lithographer William L. Walton Plate nos. 13 and 18, and Plate no. 21 by Frederick William Hulme, all employed by the publisher.

W. L. Walton was a landscape artist, working in London, who exhibited between 1834 and 1855. He also made the lithographic plates for General Sale's Defence of Jalalabad (c. 1845).).

Among the subscribers for the publication were Prince Albert, and several Rattray family members, including Capt. Charles Rattray, Pol. Agt., Turkestan; Capt. Rattray R.N.; Capt. D. Rattray, Prince Albert's Light Infantry; Lieut. T. Rattray, BNI.

Each colour plate is accompanied by a lengthy explanatory texts (commentaries), delving into detailed vivid depictions of the people, their clothing, habits, occupations. Topics relating to historical and ethnohistorical interest are described, such as the forms of worship at tombs and mosques, and the imperial rituals of the Dorranis. Verbatim excerpts of some of these texts can be found on the British Library website.

== In popular culture ==
Several works by Rattray are used in the second edition of the board game Pax Pamir, designed by Cole Wehrle, in which players assume the role of local leaders in Afghanistan after the fall of the Durrani Empire.

== Gallery ==
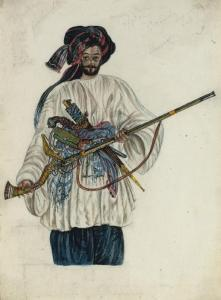
Mir Alam a Coistaunee Warrior, as sketched by Rattray c.1840

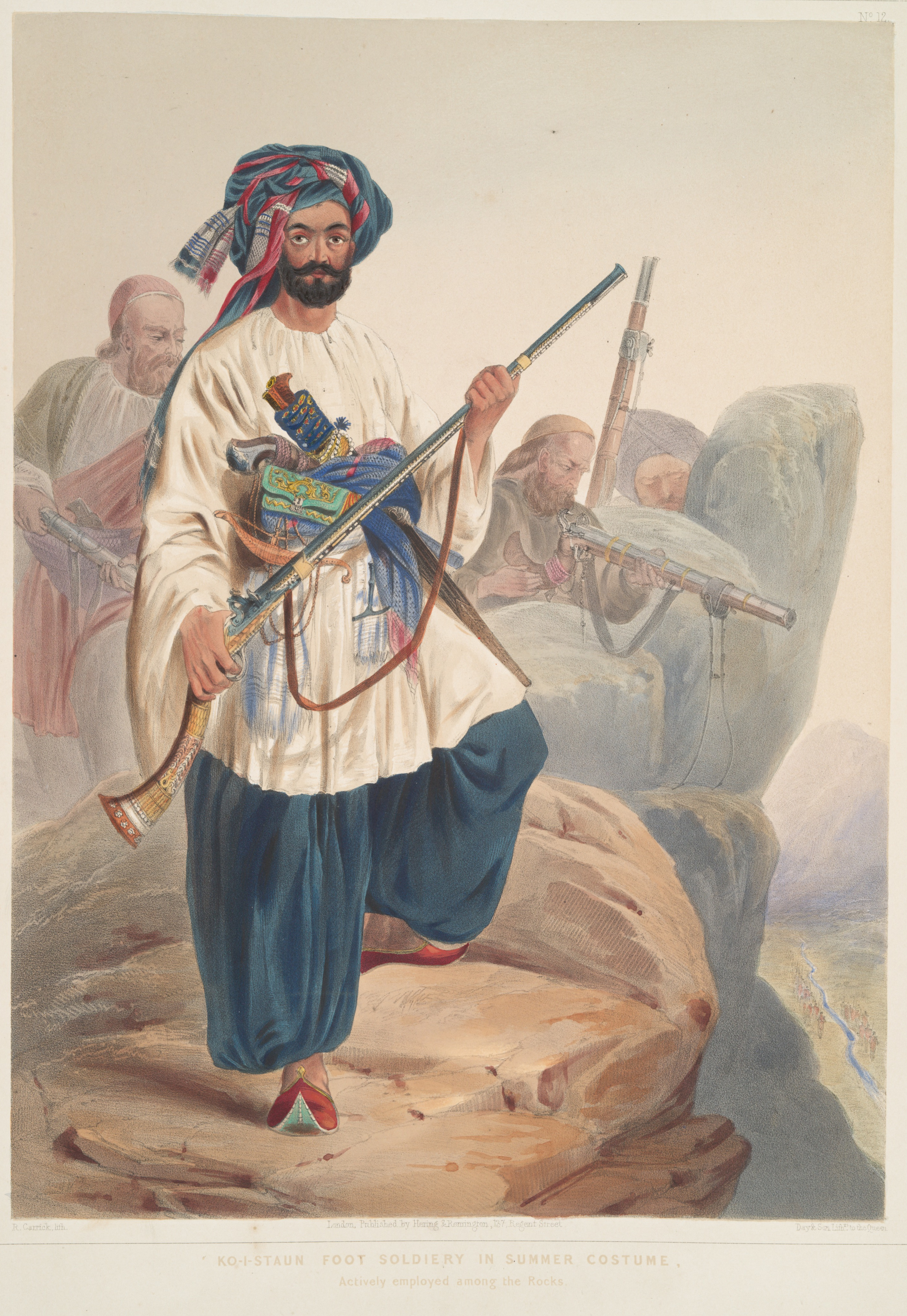
The Lithograph of the same portrait by Robert Carrick c.1847

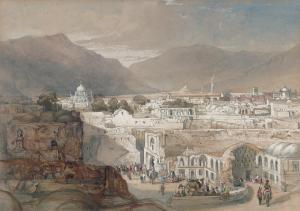
Interior of the City of Kandahar, as drawn by Rattray in Dec. 1841

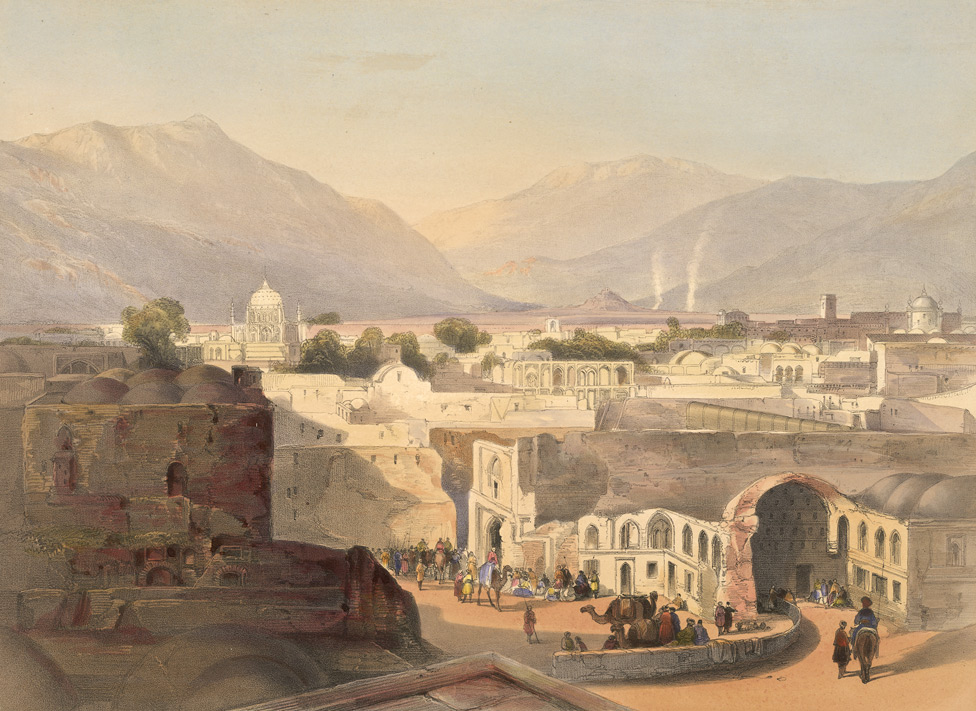
The subsequent Lithograph made by Robert Carrick c.1847

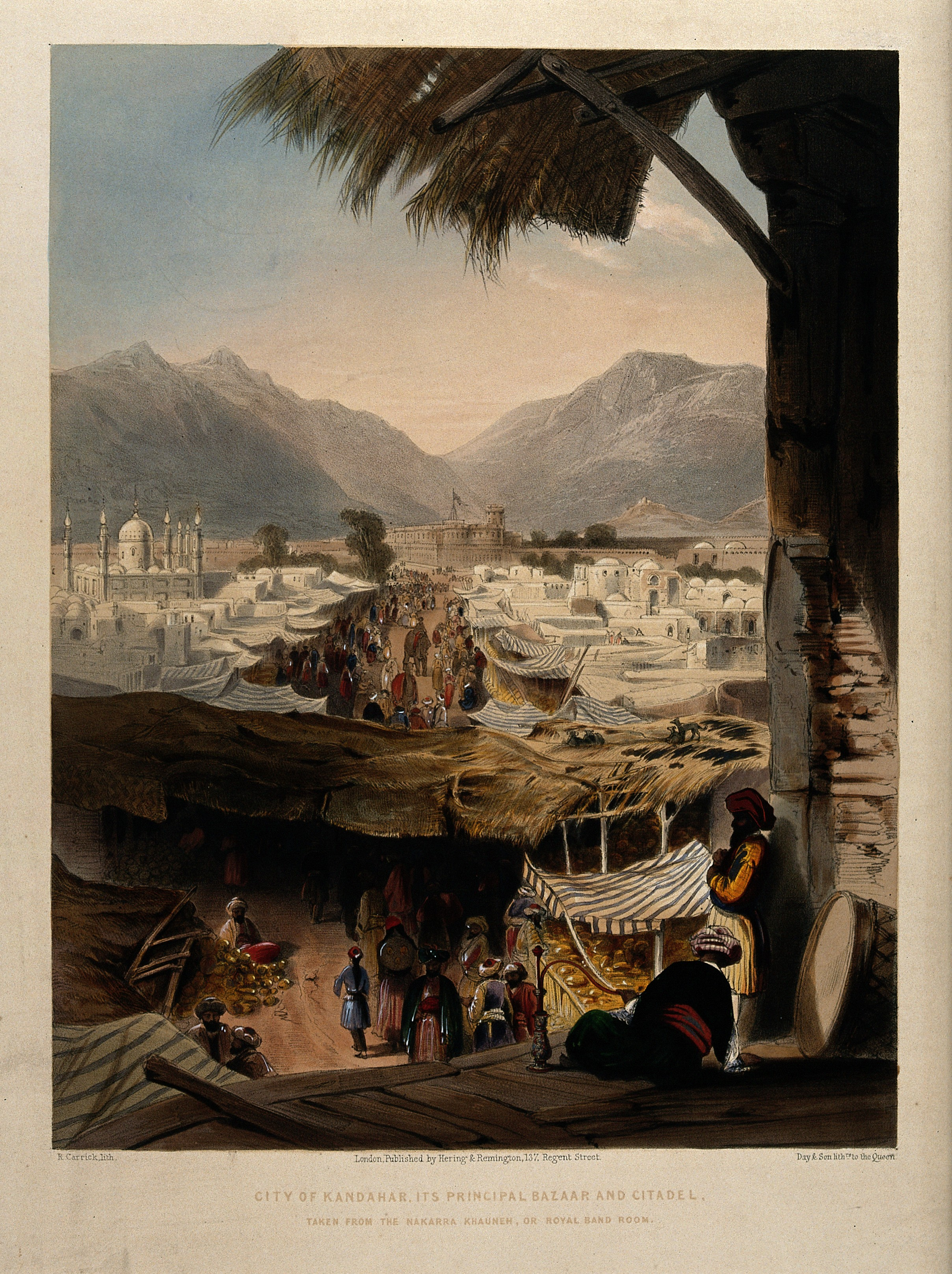
City of Kandahar, its principal bazaar and citadel, taken from the Nakkara Khauna from Lieutenant James Rattray, Afghanistan

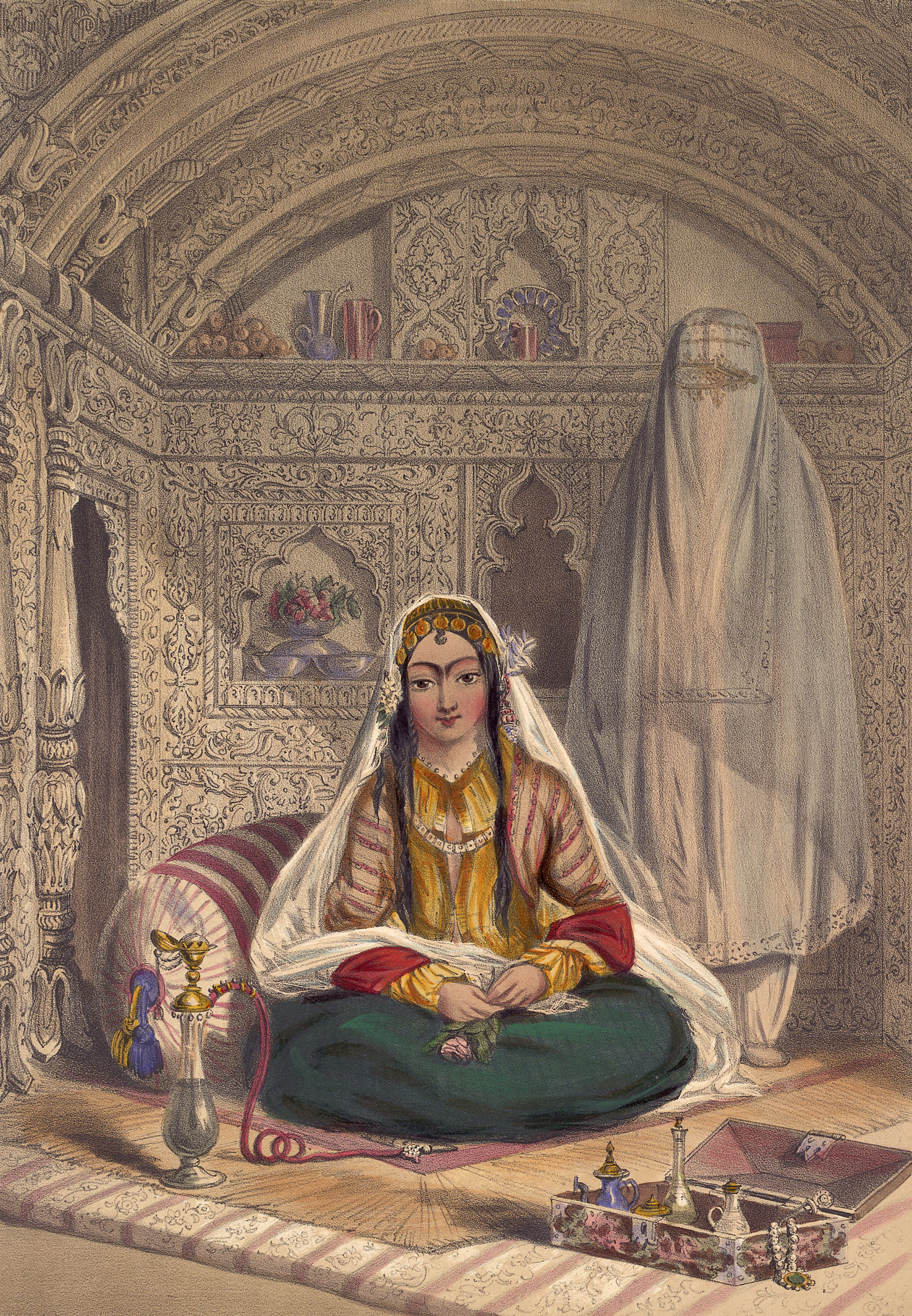
Ladies cabul by James Rattray, 1848

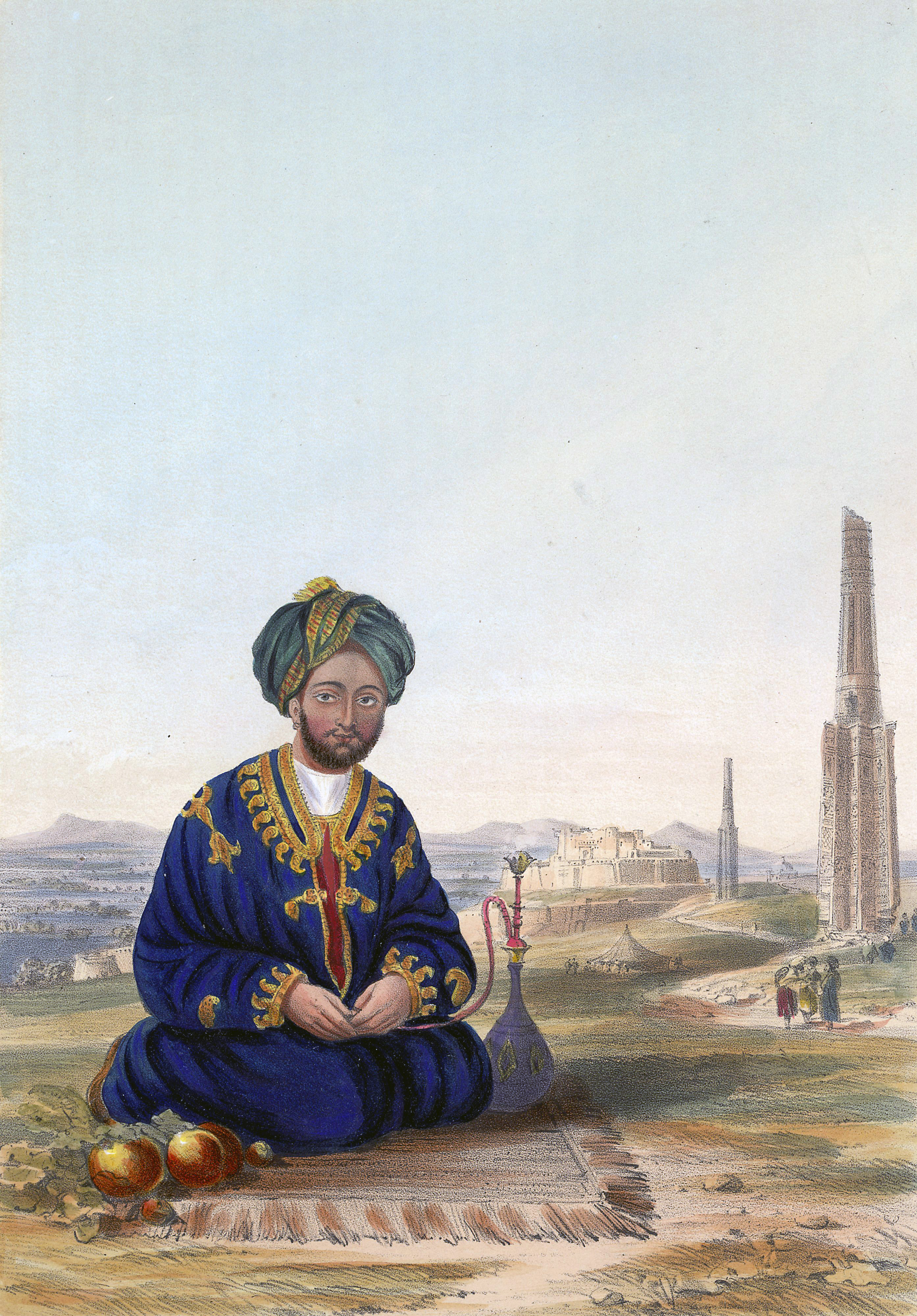
Hyder Khan of Ghazni in 1839-42 by James Rattray

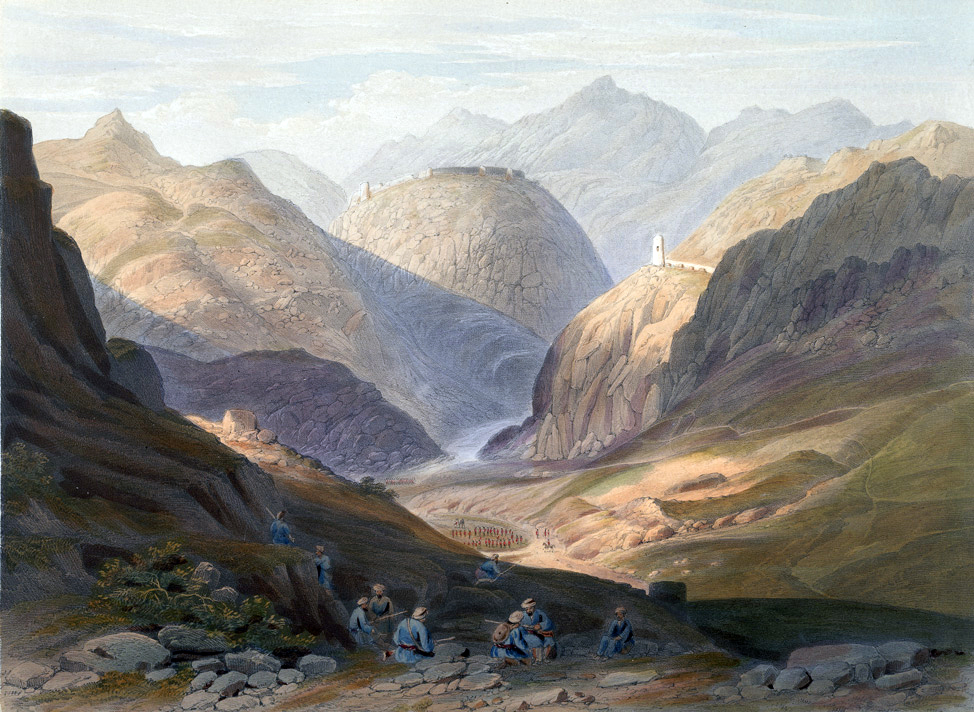
The Khyber Pass with the fortress of Alimusjid, lithograph by James Rattray, 1848
