= 2019 Origins Award winners =

The following are the winners of the 45th annual (2019) Origins Award:

== Academy Awards ==
Category	Winner	Company	Designer(s)
Game of the Year	Root	Leder Games	Cole Wehrle
Best Board Game	Root	Leder Games	Cole Wehrle
Best Card Game	The Mind	Pandasaurus Games	Wolfgang Warsch
Best Family Game	The Tea Dragon Society Card Game	Renegade Game Studios	Steve Ellis (II), Tyler Tinsley
Best Collectible Game	KeyForge	Fantasy Flight Games	Richard Garfield
Best Role-Playing Game	Vampire: The Masquerade	Modiphius Entertainment	Kenneth Hite
Best Role-Playing Game Supplement	Dungeons & Dragons: Mordenkainen's Tome of Foes	Wizards of the Coast	
Best Miniatures Game	Necromunda	Games Workshop	
and also	Star Wars Legion	Fantasy Flight Games	
Best Game Accessory	Dungeons & Dragons: Black Dragon Trophy Plaque	WizKids	

== Fan Favourites ==
Category	Winner	Company	Designer(s)
Fan Favourite Board Game	Root	Leder Games	Cole Wehrle
Fan Favourite Card Game	The Mind	Pandasaurus Games	Wolfgang Warsch
Fan Favourite Family Game	Echidna Shuffle	Wattsalpoag Games	Kris Gould
Fan Favourite Collectible Game	KeyForge	Fantasy Flight Games	Richard Garfield
Fan Favourite Role-Playing Game	Vampire: The Masquerade	Modiphius Entertainment	Kenneth Hite
Fan Favourite Role-Playing Game Supplement	Dungeons & Dragons: Mordenkainen’s Tome of Foes	Wizards of the Coast	
Fan Favourite Miniatures Game	Star Wars Legion	Fantasy Flight Games	
Fan Favourite Game Accessory	Dungeons & Dragons: Monster Cards	Gale Force Nine	

== Academy of Adventure Gaming Arts & Design Hall of Fame ==
The academy enlisted two designers and games in Academy of Adventure Gaming Arts & Design Hall of Fame.

- Gerald Brom, Writer/Illustrator
- Vladimír Chvátil, Designer/Co-founder Czech Games Edition
- Mage Knight Board Game
- Apples to Apples

== Rising Star Award ==
Jamey Stegmaier won a new award of Rising Star.
