= KeyForge =

Card game

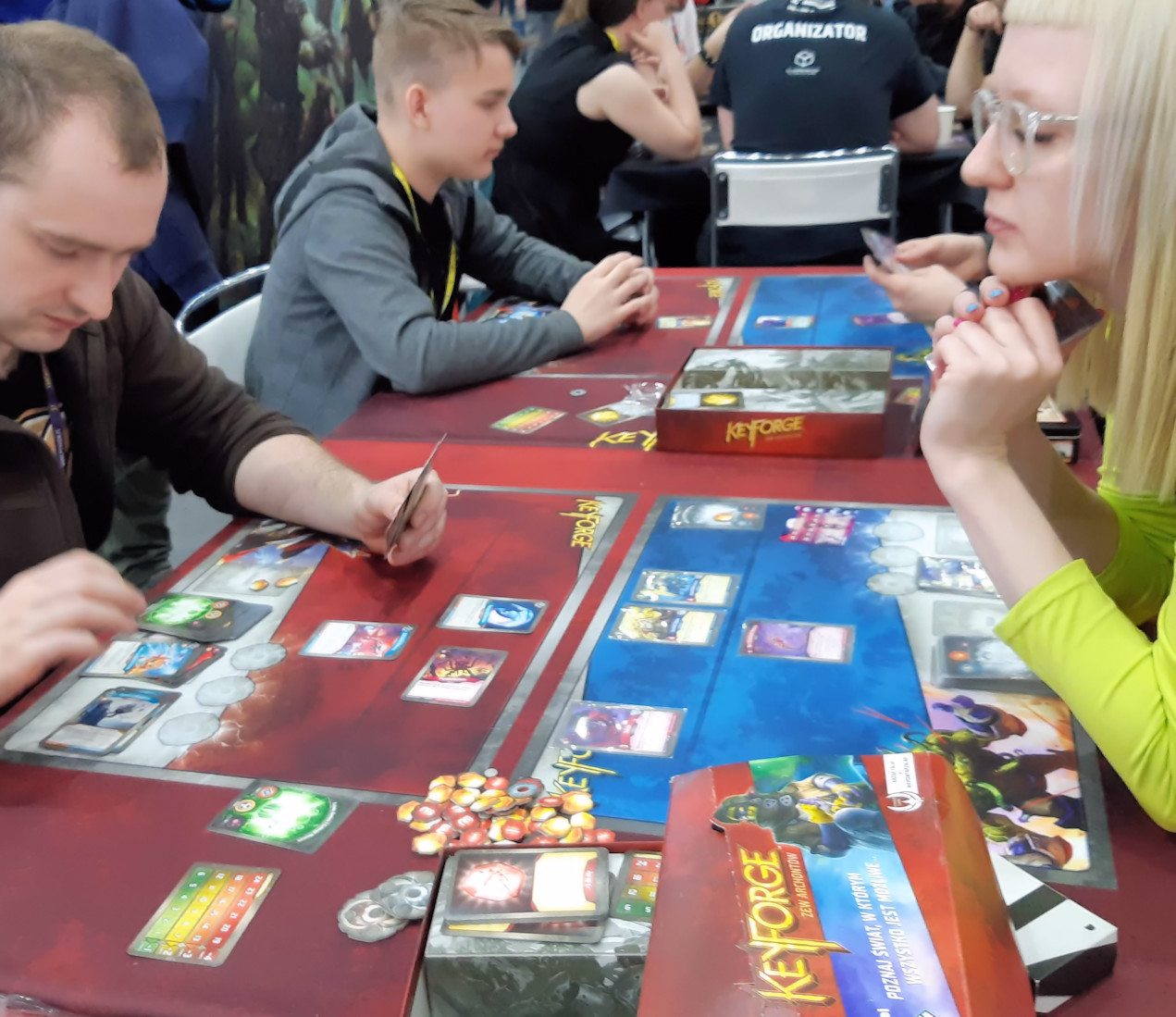
- KeyForge being played at the Pyrkon 2019 in Poznań, Poland
- Designer: Richard Garfield
- Publisher: Ghost Galaxy
- Release date: November 15, 2018; 8 years ago
- Type: Unique Deck Game
- Players: 2
- Age range: 14+
- Playing time: 30 to 45 minutes
- Chance: Moderate
- Website: www.keyforging.com

KeyForge is a unique-deck card game designed by Richard Garfield and published by Ghost Galaxy. It was released in 2018 and was originally published by Fantasy Flight Games. The latest KeyForge set titled Draconian Measures was released in May 2026.

== Gameplay ==
KeyForge is a two-player game, with each player using a single deck of cards to play creatures, artifacts, actions, and upgrades. The game's aim is to gather enough Æmber (pronounced "amber") to forge three keys before the opponent does the same. Creatures can collect Æmber and fight one another, while artifacts provide unique effects. Actions are used and discarded, and upgrades are attached to creatures to improve their abilities.

Each card in KeyForge is associated with a House, with each deck containing cards from three Houses. At the beginning of each player's turn, that player declares a House – they may then only play, use, or discard cards belonging to that House. Unlike similar card games such as Magic: The Gathering and Android: Netrunner, cards do not typically require a cost to be paid such as the expenditure of mana or credits. Instead, a player may play and use as many cards on their turn as they wish, provided the cards belong to the declared House.

Each deck features a unique card back with the name of an Archon. Decks are intended not to be modified after purchase. This is intended to reduce card trading and selling so that "net decking" (the process of researching and recreating more powerful decks) is made more difficult or impossible.

KeyForge uses a variety of tokens to track gameplay resources like Æmber, damage, power, keys, and status effects. You can obtain them through official starter sets, third-party upgrade packs, or specialized card sets.

While KeyForge was originally designed as a 2-player card game, an official "Vault Assault" format for 3 to 5 players is supported. However, this format requires a set of Boon cards (available for purchase through Ghost Galaxy) to be used for a start-of-round drafting mechanic.

KeyForge has many different unique formats, both officially supported by Ghost Galaxy in organized play and in community-driven events. Official Organized Play uses three core formats (Sealed, Archon, and Alliance) as detailed in the KeyForge Tournament Rules & Guidelines. Ghost Galaxy also details more formats for their side events in the KeyForge Alternative Formats Guide.

== Sets ==
New cards are released through expansion sets. Each set features 7 Houses, which vary from set to set. Houses used in previous sets may be reintroduced, or completely new Houses are added.

Set	Release date	New cards	Houses	Extra card
Call of the Archons	November 15, 2018	370	Brobnar, Dis, Logos, Mars, Sanctum, Shadows, Untamed	
Age of Ascension	May 30, 2019	204	Brobnar, Dis, Logos, Mars, Sanctum, Shadows, Untamed	
Worlds Collide	November 8, 2019	297	Brobnar, Logos, Mars, Saurian, Shadows, Star Alliance, Untamed	
Mass Mutation	May 29, 2020	258	Dis, Logos, Sanctum, Saurian, Shadows, Star Alliance, Untamed	
Dark Tidings	March 12, 2021	278	Logos, Sanctum, Saurian, Shadows, Star Alliance, Unfathomable, Untamed	The Tide
Winds of Exchange	September 15, 2023	262	Brobnar, Ekwidon, Mars, Sanctum, Saurian, Star Alliance, Unfathomable	Token Creature
Grim Reminders	March 1, 2024	244	Brobnar, Ekwidon, Geistoid, Mars, Star Alliance, Unfathomable, Untamed	
Æmber Skies	September 2024	208	Brobnar, Dis, Ekwidon, Geistoid, Logos, Mars, Skyborn	
Tokens of Change	February 2025	84	Dis, Geistoid, Logos, Redemption, Shadows, Skyborn, Untamed	Token Creature
Prophetic Visions	July 2025	200+	Dis, Logos, Redemption, Sanctum, Saurian, Shadows, Star Alliance, Untamed	Prophecy
Crucible Clash	September 2025	50+	Brobnar, Dis, Mars, Sanctum, Saurian, Skyborn, Untamed	Archon Power
Draconian Measures	May 2026	150+	Ekwidon, Geistoid, Mars, Ouboros, Shadows, Skyborn, Unfathomable	
Shattered Reality	2027		Brobnar, Mars, Ouboros, Shadows, Star Alliance, Unfathomable, Untamed	
Mirror Vault	2027			

Tokens of Change had fewer new cards when compared to other sets, partially because the Redemption house contains 39 cards from previous sets' other houses.

== Development ==
KeyForge was announced at Gen Con on August 1, 2018. An announcement trailer and accompanying introductory article explaining the game were published to the Fantasy Flight website, citing a launch date in the fourth quarter of 2018. Pre-orders for the KeyForge: Call of the Archons starter set and Archon deck were made available the same day, as well as PDF copies of the rulebook. It was also announced that KeyForge tournaments and events would be sanctioned through Fantasy Flight's Organized Play program, details of which were later announced on the Fantasy Flight Organized Play mini-site.

In the game's rulebook, Garfield wrote about the origin of the game, expressing his desire to see "sealed deck and league play" formats return to popularity. He described the contrast between KeyForge and other trading card games as:

like the difference between exploring a jungle and walking in an amusement park (...) In the amusement park experts are telling you how to play the game, the safest strategies, and what net decks to use. In the jungle you have the tools you have.

Garfield claimed that he had wanted to create KeyForge for 10 years before release, but the printing technology central to the idea was not yet available.

KeyForge was released November 15, 2018, with prerelease events taking place earlier in the month. On the same day the KeyForge Master Vault app and website were launched to help players keep track of decks.

In September 2021, Fantasy Flight announced that KeyForge development was going "on hiatus", explaining that the deckbuilding algorithm had broken and the company was unable to generate new decks. The announcement added that a sixth set, Winds of Exchange, would be released once they had rebuilt the system "from the ground up".

On June 22, 2022, it was announced that Ghost Galaxy, a new company by Fantasy Flight founder Christian Petersen, had acquired KeyForge from Fantasy Flight Games. Ghost Galaxy ran a Gamefound campaign to fund the release Winds of Exchange in September 2022. The campaign raised over US$1 million.

== Master Vault ==
KeyForge uses its own collective database to manage deck ownership called the Master Vault. Creating an account through Keybringer will allow players to scan the QR code included on the deck list card (also known as "discovering") and register the deck to the database under their own personal account. This utility also allows players to manage deck ownership, trade decks with friends, buy a "deck clone" which is an exact replacement of the deck, or legally share decks with friends for use in tournaments.

== KeyForge Online ==
On September 9th, 2026, Yellow King announced the development of an official online client titled KeyForge Online. While a fan-made browser client called The Crucible Online has been maintained for years, KeyForge Online will be the first official digital client partnered with Ghost Galaxy. It is estimated to be released in 2028. The crowdfunding campaign through Gamefound went live on November 12, 2026.

A public pre-alpha demo which includes a basic tutorial was released by Yellow King shortly after the campaign went live. Popular Twitch streamer Kripparrian praised the gameplay and performance of the demo despite the game being in such an early state.

== Organized Play ==
KeyForge Organized Play (OP) is managed by Ghost Galaxy, the publisher of KeyForge. Official OP typically consists of store championships, Vault Tours, and KeyForge Celebration (World Championships). Winners of these events receive "deck accolades", which are badges granted to the winning decks (viewable in the KeyForge Master Vault). Any deck clone printed after the accolade is granted will include the badge printed on each playable card in the deck.

Vault Tours are premiere events held internationally. They are open to all players and all decks. Any tournament-legal set can be used. The winner and runner-up in each format earn an invite to the World Championships at KeyForge Celebration.

World Championships are held at the KeyForge Celebration event in Roseville, MN, USA. All attendees can play in the Open events, while official World championships are invite-only.

== Spin-off media ==
In 2020, an anthology of science fantasy short stories set on the Crucible was released called Tales from the Crucible.

Also in 2020, Fantasy Flight Games released an expansion for their generic tabletop roleplaying game Genesys called Secrets of the Crucible, based on the setting created in the KeyForge game.

== Reception ==
IGN described the game as "a bold new idea and a vastly different kind of game format", but questioned the randomization model, speculating that "people won’t be spending tons of money on single rare cards, but that may have been replaced with spending tons of money on random deck boxes in the hopes of getting lucky with a great card combination." Polygon called the game "remarkable" in a hands-on demo and suggested that it "has its work cut out for it just in establishing a marketplace presence."

Upon release, the game was well received. Tom Vasel of The Dice Tower said the decks in the initial core set "feel balanced" and praised the unique aspects of the game and the gameplay.

KeyForge won both the Fan and Academy selected Best Collectible Card Game awards at the 2019 Origins Awards.
