= Star Wars: Rebellion (video game) =

1998 Star Wars video game

Star Wars Rebellion
- Developer: Coolhand Interactive
- Publisher: LucasArts
- Director: Scott Witte
- Designer: Scott Witte
- Composers: Peter McConnell; Michael Land; Clint Bajakian
- Platform: Windows
- Release: NA: March 25, 1998; EU: 1998
- Genres: Real-time strategy, 4X
- Modes: Single-player, multiplayer

Star Wars Rebellion (known as Star Wars Supremacy in the United Kingdom and Ireland) is a real-time strategy 4X game released in 1998 by LucasArts and set in the fictional Star Wars expanded universe.

== Reception ==
Reception

Aggregate score
Aggregator	Score
GameRankings	50%

Review scores
Publication	Score
CNET Gamecenter	8/10
Computer Games Strategy Plus	4.5/5
Computer Gaming World	3/5
EP Daily	5/10
Game Informer	5.5/10
GameSpot	4.5/10
Jeuxvideo.com	16/20
Next Generation	2/5
PC Gamer (US)	60%
PC PowerPlay	88%

The game received poor reviews according to the review aggregation website GameRankings. Next Generation stated, "LucasArts should start looking more closely at what it slaps the Star Wars brand on, as consumers will be less likely to forget or forgive."

According to PC Data, the game was the U.S.' 18th-best-selling computer game during the January–November 1998 period.

The game won the award for "Most Disappointing Game of the Year" at GameSpot's Best & Worst of 1998 Awards. It was also nominated for "The Underachiever Award" at IGN's Best of 1998 Awards, which ultimately went to Trespasser.

Rebellion has been more positively remembered in retrospect, with PC Gamer noting it is a "pretty effective Star Wars story generator" with compelling grand strategy elements. Game Rant also notes the game as for its rich Star Wars digital encyclopedia, unique for its time.

Macworld saw LucasArts' 2006 game Star Wars: Empire at War as a successor to Rebellion. Ars Technica notes that the Fantasy Flight's Star Wars: Rebellion board game is loosely based on the computer game.
