= Leder Games =

American board game company

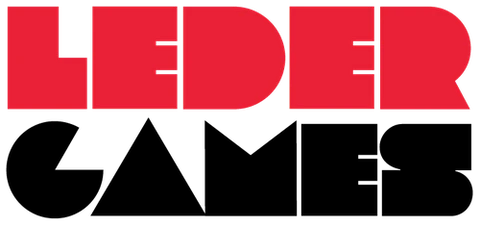
- Industry: Tabletop games
- Founded: 2014; 12 years ago
- Founder: Patrick Leder
- Products: Root; Oath: Chronicles of Empire and Exile
- Website: ledergames.com

Leder Games is a board game developer owned by Patrick Leder and based in Saint Paul, Minnesota, United States. It is best known for publishing asymmetric games such as Root and Oath: Chronicles of Empire and Exile, which were both designed by Cole Wehrle. As of 2023, board games released by the company have usually been illustrated by Kyle Ferrin.

== History ==
Leder Games was founded by Patrick Leder in 2014. Leder had been involved in board game design in his free time since 2001, obtained degrees in English and psychology at Hamline University, and quit his database programming job at Macalester College in 2016 to work on the company.

On 13 January 2026, Cole Wehrle and Kyle Ferrin announced that they would leave Leder Games to form a new company, Buried Giant Studios.

== Business model ==
Leder Games relies on the Kickstarter platform as both a funding and marketing tool. It focuses on releasing fewer, larger games in order to build anticipation, rather than releasing a large number of games each year. Distinct from many board game companies, the business does not use a contract worker model, instead building a team of more permanent and higher paid employees.

== Games ==
Leder Games' titles abide by a naming format of four letters.

=== Vast (2015) ===
In 2015, the company released their first game, Vast: The Crystal Caverns. In the game, a knight attempts to slay a dragon in a cave, with players able to play as the dragon, knight, an army of goblins, a thief, or the cave itself. It was the first game by the company to be funded by a Kickstarter campaign, initially asking for $40,000 but eventually raising $150,000. A second printing of the game raised $500,000 on the platform.

The original game was followed by Vast: The Mysterious Manor, Vast: The Fearsome Foes, and Vast: Haunted Hallways.

=== Root (2018) ===
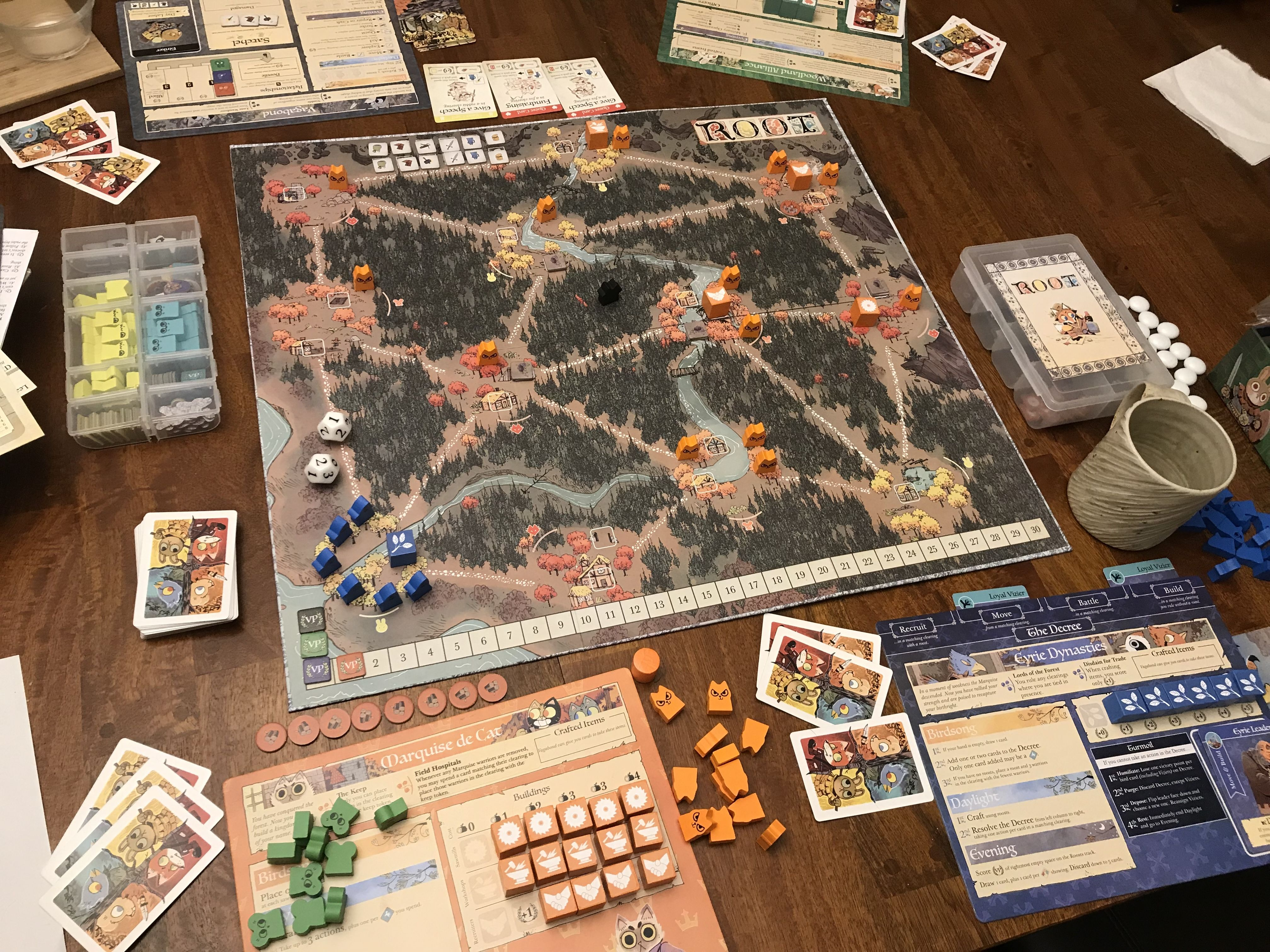
A game of Root

In 2018, Leder Games released Root: A Game of Woodland Might and Right, the first to be designed by Wehrle. It was followed by four main expansions from 2018 to 2022:

- Root: The Riverfolk Expansion (2018)
- Root: The Underworld Expansion (2020)
- Root: The Clockwork Expansion (2020)
- Root: The Marauder Expansion (2022)

A digital edition created by Dire Wolf Digital was released in 2020, and a role-playing game based upon the original game was released in 2021. Patrick Leder's Path, an open world board game that takes place in the same universe as Root, was in development in December 2022.

=== Oath (2020) ===
Oath: Chronicles of Empire and Exile is a game about intergenerational power struggles, developed by Wehrle since 2018 and released by Leder Games in 2020. In 2022, Wehrle announced that Leder Games was designing an expansion for the game.

=== Fort (2021) ===
Designed by Grant Rodiek, Fort is a deck-building game themed around children competing to build the best fort. It was rethemed from the 2018 game SPQF published by Rodiek's Hyperbole Games, originally depicting a kingdom of forest animals inspired by Ancient Rome.

The game was nominated at the 2021 SXSW Gaming Awards for Tabletop Game of the Year. Dicebreaker noted that it "fosters social interactions and emotions above everything else."

=== Ahoy (2022) ===
A pirate themed board game designed by Greg Loring-Albright, Ahoy involves four separate factions, two of whom fight over control of the expanding ocean map, while the others gain points by picking up and delivering cargo.

Dicebreaker touted the game as a "beginner-friendly" version of Root, being significantly faster and lighter but "lack[ing] the brutal politicking and long-term strategy that made Root such a standout." Game Informer listed the game as one of the best board games of 2022.

=== Arcs (2024) ===
Arcs is a space opera themed quasi-4X campaign game designed by Wehrle in which players compete to rebuild a dying empire. During design, a focus was placed upon quick games that each procedurally generate the next, creating an arc of three acts in which player powers begin symmetrically but diverge over time.

The Kickstarter campaign for the game earned over $532,000 in its first five hours and was expected to be delivered to backers in December 2023, with a retail version to follow. Polygon noted that Arcs is part of a trend of attempting to streamline board game campaigns for more rapid play, alongside games such as Legacy of Yu.

== Awards ==
=== Origins Awards ===
- Game of the Year 2019 – Root, designed by Cole Wehrle
- Best Board Game 2019 – Root, designed by Cole Wehrle
- Fan Favourite Board Game 2019 – Root, designed by Cole Wehrle

Origins awards won by Leder Games were later returned in 2020 due to concerns about the Game Manufacturers Association and support for the BIPOC community.

=== SXSW Gaming Awards ===
- Tabletop Game of the Year 2019 – Root, designed by Cole Wehrle

=== American Tabletop Awards ===
- Complex Games 2019 – Root, designed by Cole Wehrle

=== Charles S. Roberts Awards ===
- Best Science-Fiction or Fantasy Board Wargame 2021 – Oath: Chronicles of Empire and Exile, designed by Cole Wehrle

=== Golden Geek Awards ===
- Most Innovative Board Game 2021 – Oath: Chronicles of Empire and Exile, designed by Cole Wehrle
