= Republic of Rome (game) =

1990 strategy board game

- Designers: Don Greenwood; Richard Berthold; Robert Haines
- Publishers: (1990) Avalon Hill; Jeux Descartes (2009) Valley Games
- Players: 3 to 6 (solitaire and two-player rules also included)
- Setup time: 15 minutes
- Playing time: 3 hours – several days
- Chance: Medium
- Age range: 14 and up
- Skills: Diplomacy, Strategic thought

The Republic of Rome is a strategy board game, designed by Don Greenwood, Robert Haines, and Richard Berthold, and released by Avalon Hill in 1990. It takes place in the Senate of the ancient Roman Republic. The rights are now owned by Valley Games.

== Gameplay ==
Republic of Rome covers the period from 264 B.C. to 43 B.C. Three scenarios cover the Early Republic (roughly the era of the first and second Punic Wars), Mid Republic (the era of the Gracchi), and Late Republic (the time of the Roman civil wars and Julius Caesar). Each player represents a faction in the Roman Senate, with a collection of senators rated for their oratorical and military skills, popularity with the people of Rome, and most importantly, political influence. The goal of the game is to have one of one's senators amass enough Influence to be declared "Consul for Life," or, barring that, have one's faction have most total Influence when the maximum number of game turns have been played.

Within the game, Rome is threatened by foreign enemies and potential popular unrest. The heart of the game involves players managing the state's affairs in a series of mock Senate sessions, wherein proposals are made and voted on to elect officers of the Senate (the Consuls and Censor, and in times of extreme emergency, a Dictator) and governors of provinces, spend money to raise or disband legions and fleets, appoint leaders to fight Rome's enemies with said military force, enact land reforms to mollify the populace, and prosecute Senators for putative ethical lapses, among other things. While pursuing their own individual goal of increasing their faction's Influence, the players must co-operate to insure that Rome is not overwhelmed by foreign threats, popular unrest, or bankruptcy, causing Rome to fall and all players to lose (although if a player's faction is in rebellion against Rome they may win in such a situation). Within this framework, the players use diplomacy, alliances, persuasions, prosecutions, graft, bribery, murder and even conspiracies to advance their cause.

The three scenarios are differentiated by the nature of the foreign threats to Rome (in the Early Republic the state faces existential crises from foes like Carthage, while in the Late Republic Rome's enemies are weak and wars become opportunities for personal advancement by ambitious generals), by the availability of various Law cards that can be played and which illustrate the erosion of Republican tradition (allowing, for example, senators to retain their own personal armies or govern multiple provinces by proxy), and by the presence of Statesman cards representing specific famous senators of the time who have special abilities within the game.

What separates Republic of Rome from many other games is the extent to which the players have to cooperate in order to win. If a player is too selfish or too obviously becomes powerful, he will be put down by the others. If there is not enough cooperation between all players, the game wins and all players lose. No one player can win the game without negotiating alliances and using other diplomatic skills.

Another remarkable aspect is its great realism. The makers have chosen to make a complex game that would resemble as much as possible the political intrigues in the Senate (the citizen assemblies were intentionally ignored). Professional historians have noted the educational use of the game. The main concession to easier game play is the distinction between a consul who has to stay in Rome and a consul who has to fight foreign wars. As a result of this realism/complexity, a game can last for several hours, even more than one evening.

== Reception ==
In 1991 it won the Origins Award for Best Pre-20th Century Boardgame of 1990.

== Reviews ==
- Strategy Plus #3
- Strategy Plus #6
- Casus Belli #62

== 2009 version ==
The Avalon Hill company was taken over by Hasbro in 1998 and Republic of Rome went out of print. However, in June 2009, Canadian company Valley Games announced that it would redesign and rerelease the classic game before the end of the year.

The 2009 Valley Games reprint of Republic of Rome has come under a heavy degree of criticism for the number of rulebook and component (board and card) errors, some of which have a direct impact on play. The company has made no commitment to correcting the errors, though they have issued errata notes. Some reviewers of the new edition describe the production as "disappointing", and it has caused the value of previous editions of the game to rise.
