= John Company (board game) =

2017 board game by Cole Wehrle

- Cover for the second edition
- Years active: 2017 (first edition); 2022 (second edition)
- Genres: Economic
- Players: 1–6
- Playing time: 1 1/2–4 hours
- Chance: High
- Skills: Strategy, negotiation

John Company is a board game designed by Cole Wehrle, originally released in 2017 by Sierra Madre Games with a second edition in 2022 by Wehrlegig Games. The game concerns the fortunes of the British East India Company (EIC), nicknamed "John Company", as it trades with India and China, raises armies, and influences Parliament. One to six players take the role of families who co-operatively run the Company for profit, while competing against each other to acquire the most prestige.

John Company was well reviewed and Smithsonian magazine put the second edition on their list of the best board games of 2022.

== Gameplay ==
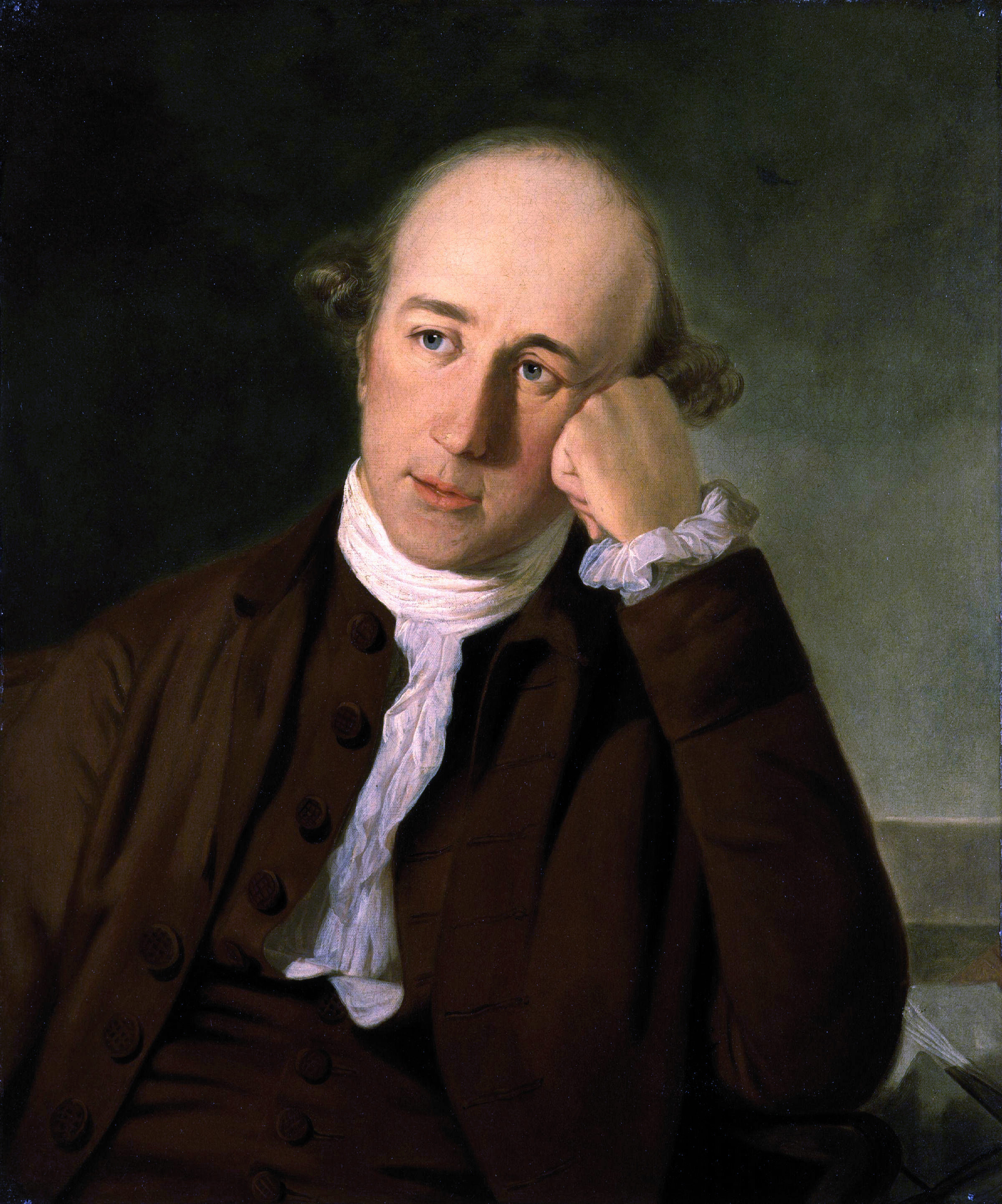
Warren Hastings was the governor of the Bengal Presidency and commander-in-chief of the EIC's army. A detail from this portrait is used on the game's President of Bengal card.

John Company is played on a board displaying a map of India, rewards for employees who retire, and information about the Company and the game state. Each player represents a family owning shares in, or having members working for, the East India Company. During setup, players receive random bonuses such as money, positions in the Company, having influence on the Prime Minister, and a set of five promise cards, which they may use when negotiating; if another player uses a promise card, the player whose card it is must fulfill the promise if they can. Promises include small loans and consent for nepotism during hiring.

Each turn, players may take a single action for the family, such as sending members to work in India, buying shares in the Company, purchasing luxuries, or setting up their own factories and shipyards. Then, the Company fills empty positions. Not all Company employees may be hired for every role; for instance, only army commanders are eligible to become the new Director of Military Affairs. Apart from this, any player's family member can be appointed to any position as long as players controlling a majority of shares in the Company agree and there is no nepotism (hiring members of one's own family) without unanimous agreement.

After family members are appointed to the Company offices, they may act. Some of these jobs affect the Company's workings; for instance, the Chairman may issue debt and the Manager of Shipping may buy new ships. Other positions, such as Presidents and army commanders, affect India. They are allowed to hire regiments and mercenaries to invade regions of the map or put down unrest. Each area also has a number of empty spaces for orders, which simulate trade. If the players invade a region of India, they may gain loot and prestige but run the risk of family members being killed or disgraced; if they trade, both the player and the Company will profit. If the players have appointed a Superintendent of Trade in China, they may also harvest opium from India and sell it in China. All these actions are carried out by die rolling; although it is possible to buy more dice, there is always a risk of failure.

India is not passive; each turn, a number of events occur, a system influenced by the event deck in Republic of Rome. Indian kingdoms may invade each other or rebel against the Company, a leader may become stronger, or the players may receive an unexpected windfall. Storms may also damage or destroy ships.

At the end of each turn, Parliament meets. Firstly, the Prime Minister player selects a law to vote on. Laws may benefit all players by offering extra actions, help some at the expense of others, or be generally harmful. Players are allowed to discuss which law to choose and then negotiate for support. If the law passes, it takes effect immediately and the Prime Minister player gains prestige; if not, the player who voted against the law becomes the new Prime Minister.

=== The London Season ===
The first phase of every turn represents the London Season, in which prominent members of British society gather in London. First, players roll to see which of their office holders age or retire to Britain, becoming pensioners. Then, each player may use their family's accumulated wealth to buy country houses for their pensioners to retire to. In addition, there is a row of prestige cards available. A players whose pensioner retired this turn may take one; these provide bonuses and occasional restrictions. For instance, control of a rotten borough provides the player with extra votes in Parliament, and blackmail cards have strong negative effects if used on other players; spouses offer various benefits, including discounts on retirement.

Retiring to more valuable properties gains players more victory points. Players also gain victory points for achievements such as passing laws or conquering Indian kingdoms, and for having the most power, which takes different forms and may be manipulated throughout the game. Usually, shares in the Company are also worth points; however, if the Company goes bankrupt, shares are worth negative victory points and a card is drawn to see what consequence the players suffer.

=== Advanced scenarios ===
The basic scenario, which begins in 1710, is five rounds long. Advanced scenarios begin in 1758 (5 rounds), 1813 (4 rounds), and 1710 (8 rounds, simulating the EIC's entire history). These are longer, have different setup to simulate history at that time, and have advanced rules, including the ability for players to deregulate the Company and set up and buy shares in rival companies. There is also a mode with an automated opponent, in which one to two players compete against the Crown's interest in the Company.

== Theme ==
In the rulebook, Wehrle describes the game as "a frank portrait of an institution that was as dysfunctional as it was influential", discussing imperialism, globalization, and how these affected Britain. He also states that it "attempts to tell one small part of the origin story of the British Empire" and show how "decent people can do some truly evil things to advance their own prospects".

In an essay published ahead of the second edition Kickstarter, he described it as concerned with the imperial imaginary – how people and institutions view themselves – and influenced by Frantz Fanon's description of how empire changed not only geopolitical facts but relationships between people.

Other influences on the game design included John Keay's The Honourable Company, Sashi Tharoor's Inglorious Empire, and The Anarchy by William Dalrymple, as well as history books by Barbara Harlow, Mia Carter, Margot Finn, Kate Smith, Jean Sutton, Kirti N. Chaudhuri, Christopher Bayly, Philip J. Stern, and Lucy Sutherland. Wehrle also cites the theoretical works Benedict Anderson's Imagined Communities, Saree Makdisi's Making England Western, and Edward Said's Culture and Imperialism in the rulebook. Wehrle has described John Company as a meditation on Culture and Imperialism's remarks on Mansfield Park and as an attempt to popularize the history of imperialism as a challenge to historical amnesia.

== Historical background ==
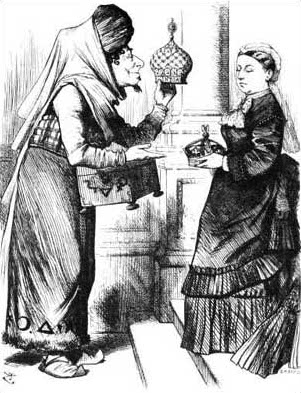
A Punch cartoon by John Tenniel from 1876, showing the Prime Minister Benjamin Disraeli dressed as the evil wizard Abanazar, offering to exchange crowns with Queen Victoria. This cartoon is used on the Parliament Exposed! card, with a note that the period's racism affected even anti-colonial positions.

Players of John Company will consider some of the issues that affected the historical EIC between 1710 and the 1860s. For instance, they must decide whether or not to try to conquer the Indian kingdoms; if they do, they may install a Governor-General, and traffic the opium they control to China. Players may hire Indians to assist them; these include Sikhs, the Jagat Seth family, Awadh, Arcot, Orissa, the Nizam of Hyderabad, and a Rajput prince. Meanwhile, Indians may revolt against the Company; in the real world, this was a factor in the EIC's downfall, due to the Indian Rebellion of 1857.

The exact setup rules depend on the scenario the players choose, reflecting the historical fortunes of India and the EIC. For the 1710 or long 1710 scenarios, the Company has no debt, weak armies, and no ships. If the game starts in 1758, the Calico Acts will already have been passed, there is a governor in Bengal, the Company is already in debt, and Mysore and Bombay are stronger than in 1710. For an 1813 scenario, the Company has larger armies and more ships, while Bombay is weaker but the Punjab stronger.

The laws players consider voting on also reflect historical fact. One card in the deck represents the Calico Acts; historically, these banned imports of cotton (as the EIC had been doing) and helped the rise and industrialization of the British cotton industry. If passed, the game card simulates this by reducing Company profits and allowing players to buy extra workshops while rewarding those who already have them; it also has support in Parliament, which reflects how MPs represented local economies dependent on textiles, while the rents of many Lords were connected to the wool industry. The Writer Privileges law, on the other hand, has less support in Parliament, but allows the players to gain extra money from trading in India, and makes future votes to deregulate the Company easier; a historical note on the card explains that reducing restrictions led to cheaper prices for Indian goods in Britain, which led to more support for deregulation. Players may also debate whether to recruit sepoys (Indian soldiers), extend the franchise (reducing the value of rotten boroughs and making it more expensive to buy votes), or provide relief for famines in India. These reflect issues Britain and the EIC faced in the 18th and 19th centuries, such as the expansion of the franchise, inclosure acts, and famines in India.

One of the game's topics is the relationship between the EIC's actions in India and British culture then and now, and how reliant Britain was on its empire. For example, if the Company is successful, players will have more money and votes with which to influence Parliament; but whether it is or not, its violent actions will inevitably affect its own culture.

=== Art ===
John Company, like Pax Pamir, uses period paintings and illustrations in several places. The office holder cards are illustrated with portraits of people who held the particular post, such as Warren Hastings on the President of Bengal card and Robert Abercromby on the President of Bombay card and the first edition box cover.

Blackmail and spouse cards are illustrated by caricatures, as is a dial used by the Prime Minister player, and incidental art throughout. The rulebook is illustrated with cartoons, including two by James Gillray commenting on the impeachment trial of Warren Hastings in the House of Commons for his actions while governor of Bengal. Meanwhile, one of the Company Failure cards depicts New Crowns for Old, a Punch cartoon by John Tenniel depicting the prime minister, Benjamin Disraeli, as the evil Abanazar from Aladdin. The card text notes that although the cartoon criticizes Disraeli's ambitions, it also shows how racism was present throughout Victorian society, even in anti-imperialist contexts.

The box art is mainly red. The bottom half depicts a factory in India, while the top half shows a detail from Thomas Rowlandson's A Gaming Table at Devonshire House (1791), in which wealthy Georgians including Henrietta Ponsonby, Countess of Bessborough; her sister Georgiana Cavendish, Duchess of Devonshire; and George, Prince of Wales (later George IV), gambling at the dice game hazard, likely at Devonshire House on Piccadilly in Westminster. Although the two pictures are very different in topic and style, the juxtaposition implies that they are two faces of a single historical reality. The art on the inside of the box lid shows the signing of an alliance between the EIC and Madhavrao II, peshwa of the Maratha Empire, against the Tipu Sultan.

However, not all of the art is Western. The rulebook includes a painting by the Indian artist Venkatchellum depicting Indian and EIC troops marching together c. 1790, and the tiles used to determine events in India were designed and painted to resemble ganjifa tiles.

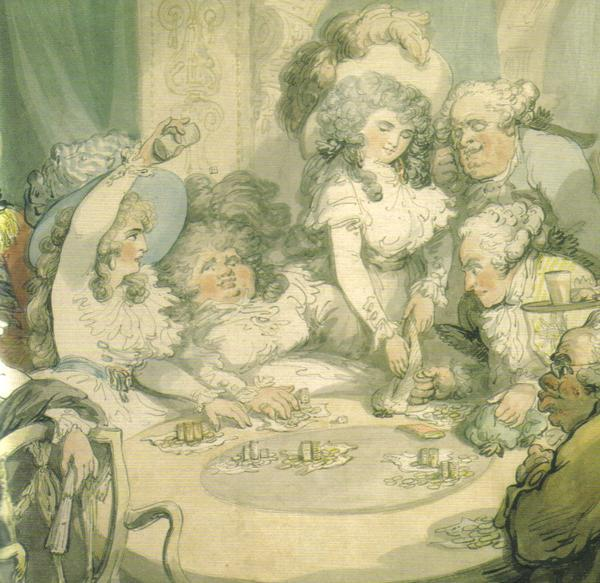
A detail from Thomas Rowlandson's A Gaming Table at Devonshire House (1791). A detail of this picture is used as part of the box design.

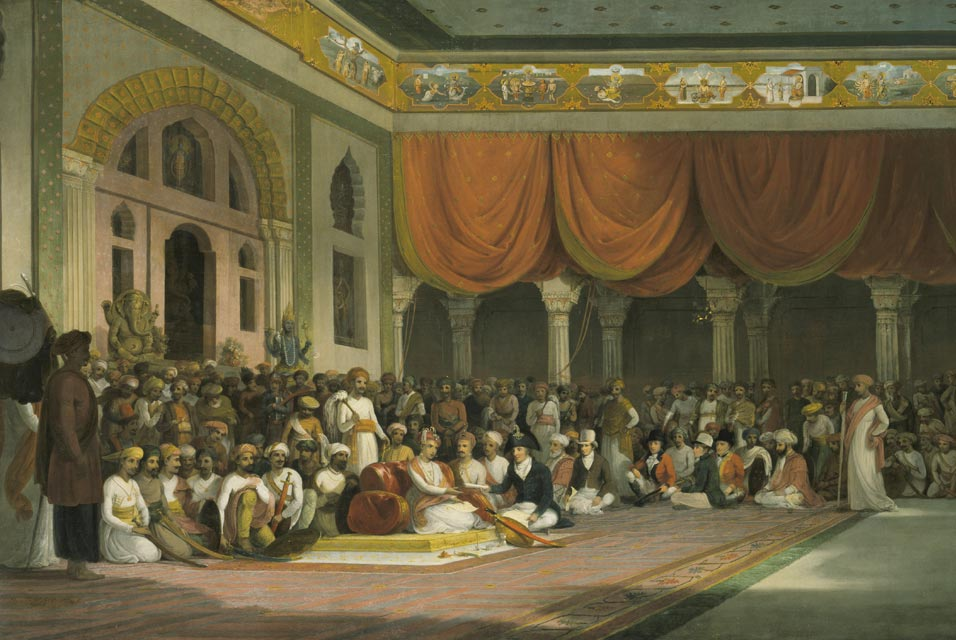
Sir Charles Warre Malet, Concluding a Treaty in 1790 in Durbar with the Peshwa of the Maratha Empire by Thomas Daniell decorates the interior of the box top.

=== The game as historical fiction ===
Wehrle attempted to present the game from a satirical point of view. He describes the game as "essentially ... historical fiction", manipulating the historical record for aesthetic effect, and in the rulebook he recommends the novels Dombey and Son by Charles Dickens and Vanity Fair and The Newcomes by William Makepeace Thackeray to help players understand the game's milieu. In addition, the spouses are all drawn from 19th century British literature, similar to the inclusion of the Harry Flashman card in Pax Pamir. They include Mr Rochester of Jane Eyre, Becky Sharp and Joseph Sedley of Vanity Fair, Lady Newcome of The Newcomes, Esther Summerson of Bleak House, Lady Glencora and Violet Effingham of the Palliser novels by Anthony Trollope, John Thorpe of Northanger Abbey, and Mr Collins of Pride and Prejudice. In addition, one of the ship tokens shows the Obra Dinn.

== Release history ==
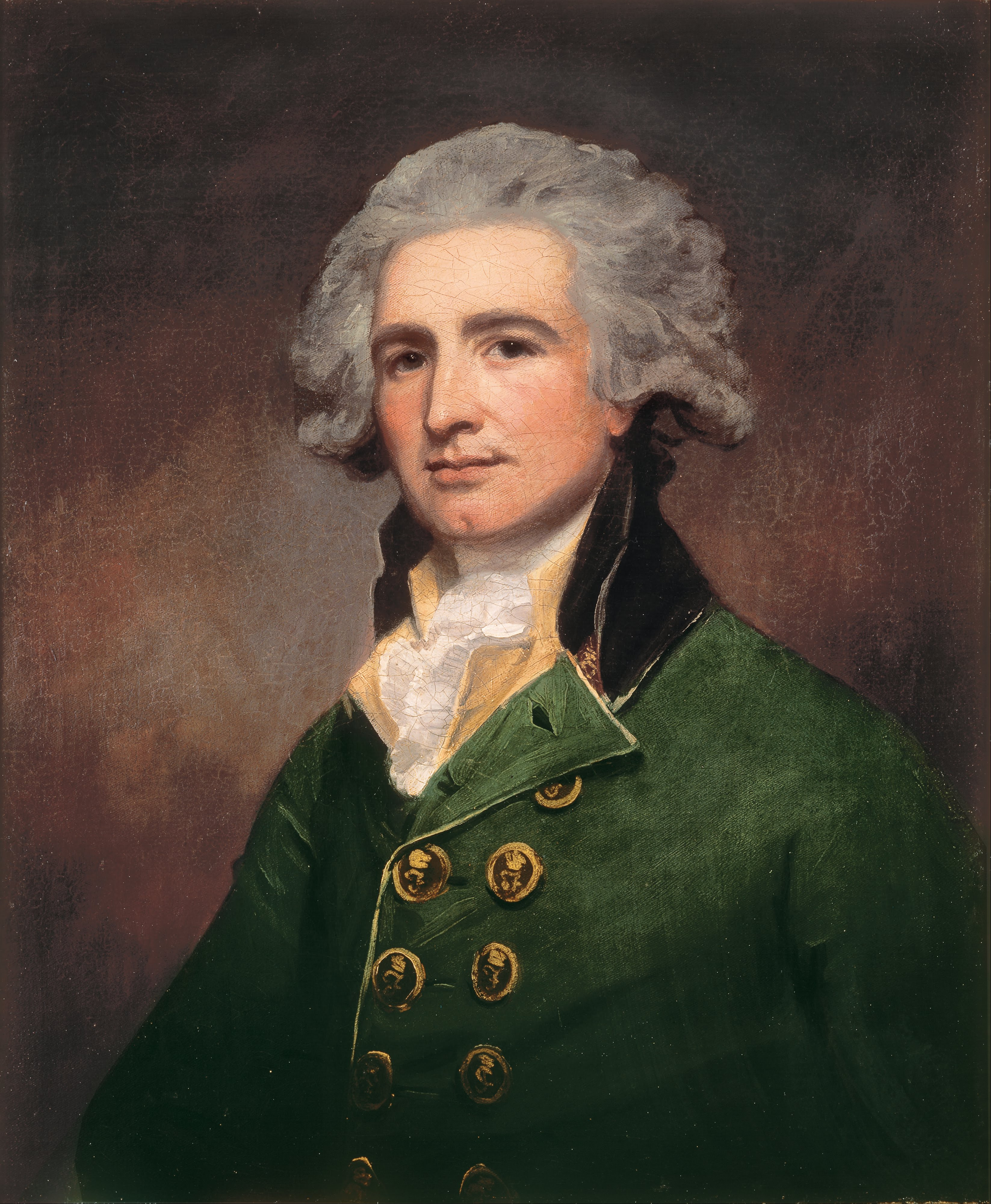
Portrait of Robert Abercromby, Governor of Bombay and Commander-in-Chief, India. Details from this portrait by George Romney were used as the cover image for the first edition box, and in both editions' President of Bombay cards.

Wehrle began developing the game in 2009, inspired by playing the Avalon Hill game Republic of Rome and a wish for more games about institutional history. However, this design did not work. After further attempts failed in 2011 and 2013, he tried again in 2016 and succeeded. The first edition was published in 2017 by Sierra Madre Games, who had published the first edition of his first game, Pax Pamir, and its expansion Khyber Knives. This edition had a portrait of Robert Abercromby on the front.

After finishing the second edition of Pax Pamir, Wehrle and his brother Drew began revising it for re-release by their own company, Wehrlegig Games. Originally, the planned changes were small, but as development continued they grew to affect the core of the design. The game made its public debut at the 2020 San Diego Historical Games Convention. On March 30, 2021, Wehrlegig launched a Kickstarter for the second edition (and a reprint of Pax Pamir Second Edition), with a target of US$50,000; by March 31, more than $330,000 had been pledged; ultimately, the Kickstarter raised nearly $800,000. The game was re-released in 2022.

== Reception ==
EJ Insight described the second edition as "not an easy game to understand or play" and stated that the rulebook could have been better written, but also called it "unique", "exciting", and "highly educational". Dan Thurot noted that the emphasis on negotiation makes the Company's dealings harder to ignore and discussed how the excitement of dice throwing helps players understand the game's darker themes. He also compared it to what Robert Southey called oikophobia, a drive to expand, and contrasted John Company's examination of the past with Roger Scruton's distaste for self-examination and cultural critique. He concluded that it was "audacious" and "marvelous and multilayered". Charlie Theel called it a "magnificence" and the best game of 2022, with emotional complexity and a rich strategic puzzle. He noted Wehrle's emphasis on distancing the players from the events of the game so they could better appreciate it, and likened his approach to that of a historical wargame designer. Slate called the game Wehrle's "magnum opus", but described its subtext as "horrific" and stated that many players were uncomfortable with the game. Tom Brewster mentioned the same issue in a Shut Up & Sit Down video review; Brewster said that though he considered John Company "a great work of art", it provoked powerful reactions and that around 50% of the people he had played it with never wanted to play it again.

Smithsonian magazine named it one of their best games of 2022, describing it as not for "beginners—or anyone uncomfortable with mixing play with dark historical themes", but "beautifully crafted". It also noted that although many board games have been faulted for glorifying colonialism, John Company engaged with this criticism; it compared the game to Spirit Island.

It was nominated for Best Early Modern Wargame in the 2022 Charles S. Roberts Awards and for four awards in the 2022 Golden Geek Awards, organized by BoardGameGeek, in the categories Most Innovative, Heavy Board Game, Thematic Board Game, and Best Artwork & Presentation.

== See also ==
Other games designed by Wehrle:

- Oath: Chronicles of Empire and Exile
- Pax Pamir
- Root
