= Cole Wehrle =

American board game designer

- Education: University of Texas
- Occupation: Board game designer
- Years active: 2015–present
- Employer: Buried Giant Studios
- Notable work: Pax Pamir; Root; John Company; Oath; Arcs
- Website: wehrlegig.com

Cole Wehrle is an American board game designer and academic. He has designed the board games Root, Oath: Chronicles of Empire and Exile, and Arcs at Leder Games, and he co-owns Wehrlegig Games with his brother, designing the historical games Pax Pamir, John Company and co-designing Molly House.

== Education ==
Wehrle gained a degree in Journalism and English at Indiana University before going to graduate school at the University of Texas, gaining a PhD there in 2017, for which his dissertation was titled "The Narrative Dimensions of Empire: Time and Space in the British Imperial Imaginary, 1819–1855". Wehrle earned a doctorate in the literature of British colonialism.

== Career ==
While studying at the University of Texas, Wehrle began developing his first game, Pax Pamir, about Afghanistan during the fall of the Durrani Empire, inspired by Pax Porfiriana, set during the Mexican Revolution (1910–1920). Pax Pamir was published in 2015 under Sierra Madre Games, with Wehrle working with Phil Eklund to do so, as he did for the first edition of John Company in 2017. He subsequently designed the 2016 game An Infamous Traffic about the opium wars of China, in which he "believes he achieves the payoff by juxtaposing sobriety with absurdity."

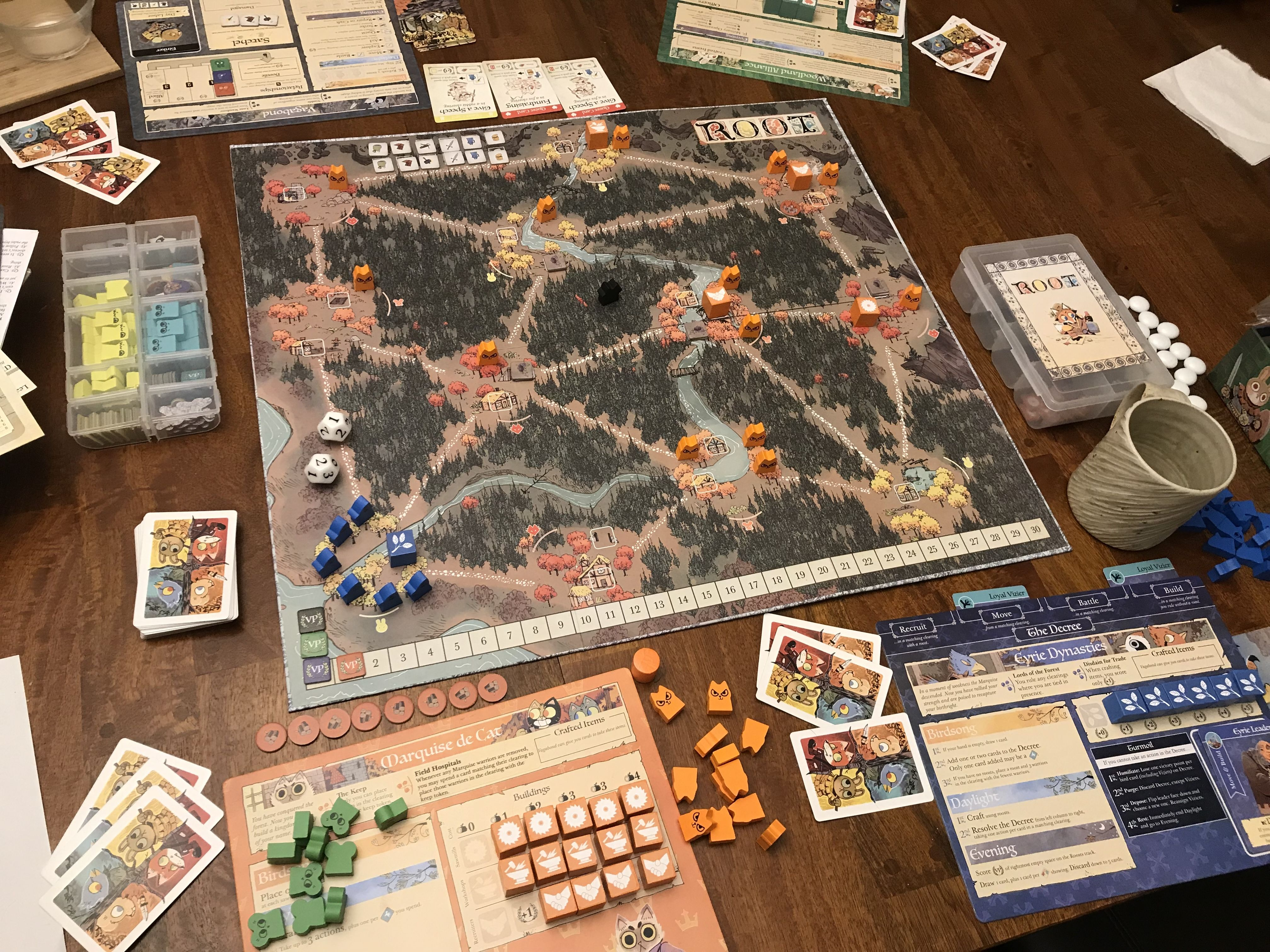
A game of Root

Root, Wehrle's first game with Leder Games, was crowdfunded in 2017 and published the following year. He designed Root as a "simulation of political and economic warfare of a struggle for the hearts and minds of the people" which is "radically asymmetric" in which "Each side plays by different rules and aims at different goals; they virtually play different games. Root is based on the COIN series of war games – a series of extremely complex simulations of counterinsurgency warfare." A reviewer for the New York Times said that "I'm going to make this sound really weirdly intellectual, but let me just say that Cole Wehrle has a designer diary where he explains how the idea of this game came from his graduate studies into Foucauldian biopower."

A new version of Pax Pamir: Second Edition was released in 2019 as the first release from Wehrlegig Games. Wehrlegig then published a second edition of John Company, having obtained $787,000 in funding for the game; Slate called it Wehrle's "magnum opus". Following the release, Wehrlegig Games announced that the company would expand to publish other designers' works in the historical board game subgenre, and Wehrle cofounded the Zenobia Award in 2020, intended to highlight and support underrepresented designers in the industry.

Wehrle designed the 2021 game Oath: Chronicles of Empire and Exile after first pitching the game in 2018, inspired in part by Reiner Knizia's game Medici. Matt Jarvis in a review of Oath on Dicebreaker said that "unlike designer Cole Wehrle’s breakout hit Root, all of the players have the same set of options and actions – for the most part – at their disposal. [...] Cole Wehrle has added another masterpiece to his already gleaming collection of games that are as interesting around the table as they are on it." Dan Jolin in a review of Oath said that "Those drawn in by Kyle Ferrin's awesomely evocative and characterful artwork – think The Dark Crystal by way of Richard Scarry – might be put off by designer Cole Wehrle's almost highbrow yet generic terminology (that wordy subtitle is a big tip-off)."

Leder Games launched a Kickstarter in 2022 to fund Wehrle's space opera strategy board game Arcs. In 2024 he released Zenobia Award runner-up Molly House under Wehrlegig Games, about molly houses and queer culture in Georgian England, for which he aided Jo Kelly in design.

On January 13, 2026, Wehrle announced his amicable departure from Leder Games to found his own tabletop game company Buried Giant Studios together with Kyle Ferrin (illustrator of Root, Oath, and Arcs, among other games), Wehrle's brother Drew, and Ted Caya. Leder Games also decided to sell Oath and Arcs IPs to Buried Giant, but retained the ownership of Root.

== Design philosophy ==
Wehrle takes an academic and directly political approach to board game design, and has stated that he is "not interested in whether or not a game is fun", instead electing to focus upon his games being "compelling" in an emotional sense. On the topic of fun, he further says "we're not trying to make the game fun. We're trying to make the game good." He has considered some of his games, notably John Company, as satire. He has also stated that board game aesthetics, "like the rules that structure their play, are essentially political in that they organize the relationship between the players. [...] For, if games structure play, so too do they structure feeling." Wehrle has taken action to support representation and diversity within the industry, publishing games from designers who are minoritised.

== Ludography ==
- Pax Pamir, 2015
- An Infamous Traffic, 2016
- John Company, 2017
- Root, 2018
- Pax Pamir: Second Edition, 2019
- Oath: Chronicles of Empire and Exile, 2021
- John Company: Second Edition, 2022
- Arcs, 2024
- Molly House, 2024
