= Oath: Chronicles of Empire and Exile =

2021 asymmetric board game

Oath
Chronicles of Empire and Exile
- Designers: Cole Wehrle
- Illustrators: Kyle Ferrin
- Publishers: Leder Games
- Publication: 2021; 5 years ago
- Players: 1-6
- Playing time: 45-150 minutes
- Chance: Medium
- Age range: 10+

Oath: Chronicles of Empire and Exile is an American board game designed by Cole Wehrle, illustrated by Kyle Ferrin, and published by Leder Games in 2021.

Oath is set in a fantasy land similar to that of The Dark Crystal and The Chronicles of Prydain. Players with asymmetric roles compete on a neoprene modular map to either defeat or win as the Chancellor. The events and winner of each game influence the events of the games that follow; Oath is part of an increase in the release of games that have a legacy or campaign structure. The game is focused on fantasy politics and crisis, and intentionally includes kingmaking and metagaming aspects.

Upon its release, Oath received positive reviews. An expansion for the game, Oath: New Foundations, is in development.

== Gameplay ==
In Oath, 1-6 players compete, taking upon the role of individuals who are trying to rule a fantasy land. Every player has the same major actions; they may search the deck, muster troops, trade favor and secrets (the two main currencies in the game), recover relics and banners, campaign militarily against enemies, and travel across the board. These actions are limited by a player's Supply, which changes based on the size of their army. Through the use of the almost 200 Denizen cards that can be picked up throughout the game, players are given access to unique powers.

The game has three different asymmetric player roles; the sole Chancellor that inherits their power from the previous game, the Exiles that oppose the Chancellor, and the Citizens who have common interests with the Chancellor but must attempt to seize power from them to win. The Chancellor player begins with significant control over several of eight sites which are divided between three regions: the Cradle, the Provinces and the Hinterland. Exile characters can become Citizens, usually through the Chancellor offering them citizenship. The Chancellor can also banish Citizens to turn them back to Exiles if the correct conditions are met, and Citizens also have the possibility to banish themselves if it is in their own interest.

Oath has eight rounds, though a die roll decides whether the game ends at the end of the fifth round onward; the Chancellor, if they continue to fulfil their goal (their oath), may roll a die three times from turn five until turn eight, increasing their chances to roll the target number each turn and win as Oathkeeper. Different rules and victory conditions also apply between Exiles and Citizens. Exiles can attempt to usurp the oath themselves as a Usurper, or can pick up a Vision card to enable a secret victory goal, winning as a Visionary. Separately, a Citizen may only win by fulfilling the Chancellor's oath more effectively, becoming a Successor. Often, the game will end with a losing player forced to be a kingmaker for the other players, often decided through informal deal making and metagaming.

Each game is shaped by the actions of the previous winner, though this is not a scripted campaign and has no defined endpoint. This includes replacing six Denizen cards each game, and changing the modular map of sites each game. As such, actions extend beyond individual games into longer campaigns and this causes alliances and factions to continue game-to-game. For games with only one or two players, Oath includes an automated version of the Chancellor, the Clockwork Prince.

== Development ==
The game was in development since 2018. Wehrle sought in the production of Oath to place narrative value as a priority, and to remove any predetermined scenarios so that every element of the game could be altered. His experience of second hand board games during childhood, such as Squad Leader and other Avalon Hill board games, often from second hand shops with missing pieces, as well as HeroQuest and Chancellorsville, led him to want to design a board game that had a "more resonant echo"; he wanted each box to have a tangible history without the player destroying parts of it, as was the norm in many legacy games. Other inspirations for Wehrle in terms of Oath included Imperium, Barbarian, Kingdom and Empire, and Blood Royale, a role-playing game. He has also noted that his idea for Oath's campaign mechanism came from his altering of the game Pax Porfiriana, using a house rule to change it into a campaign itself. Wehrle wrote about his development of the game in a series of design diaries, in which he often wrote about "empire" and the historical, political and imperial strategies played by the game's different roles.

In 2022, Wehrle announced that Leder Games was in the early development stages of an expansion for Oath. This expansion, named Oath: New Foundations and originally anticipated for November 2025, is expected to feature new mechanics and a new single-player mode.

== Kickstarter ==
A Kickstarter campaign for the game was launched in January 2020 to fund its production, with a single pledge level of $90. Backers who pledged this amount received a journal to chronicle their sessions as well as metal favor coins and resin secret tokens, which were sold separately to the public upon the game's full release. It met its funding goal of $50,000 quickly.

== Reception ==
Oath received generally positive reviews. Dicebreaker wrote of the game's "small, thoughtful details" and "evocative world and deep strategy". Polygon described the game as "an elaborate role-playing game wearing the clothes of a complex strategy title", and later praised the game for its neoprene game board. In 2021, Gamereactor complimented its production and design, but also wrote of the game's steep learning curve, niche target audience, and "convoluted to follow" Clockwork Prince solo mechanic. IGN listed the game as one of the best strategy board games in 2022.

Tabletop Gaming compared Ferrin's artwork for the game to The Dark Crystal, calling it "evocative and characterful." Gábor Zoltán Kiss in the Hungarian Journal of English and American Studies has described Oath's fantasy world as similar to Lloyd Alexander's The Chronicles of Prydain pentalogy.

Kiss has noted that the game treats its victory points and its ending unconventionally, and that this can "enhance the experience of playing together." He has stated; "The constant changing of roles, or the mere possibility of it, adds a great deal of tension to the game; and when the change actually happens, it is experienced as an emotional climax", and he also identified the appearance, acquisition, and play of Vision cards and the end-game Oathkeeper–Successor dynamic as emotional peaks within the game. He said that "the game itself functions as a sandbox, an inventory of possibilities between board and denizens, operational rules and victory conditions, where players can experiment with the elements of the system to bend the game’s history towards themselves, and thus write its own chronicle."

There has been some criticism of the randomised ending mechanism from players, which Wehrle has defended by stating that its unpredictability encourages risk-taking. Kiss has also noted that the differing win conditions make the state of the board difficult to read.

== Awards ==
- 2021 Golden Geek Award for 'Most Innovative Board Game'
- 2021 Tabletop Gaming Award for 'Best Board Game of 2021'
- 2021 Dice Tower 'Best Game from a Small Publisher' nominee
- 2022 SXSW Gaming Awards' 'Tabletop Game of the Year' nominee
- 2022 American Tabletop Awards' 'Complex Games' award nominee.

== See also ==
- Root, Pax Pamir, and John Company, other board games designed by Cole Wehrle
