= Pax Pamir =

2015 board game by Cole Wehrle

- Pax Pamir Second Edition box cover
- Years active: 2015 (first edition), 2019 (second edition)
- Genres: Strategy game, Wargame
- Players: 1-5
- Playing time: 1-2 hours
- Skills: Hand management, strategy, politics

Pax Pamir is a board game for 1 to 5 players originally designed by Cole Wehrle and Phil Eklund, released in 2015 by Sierra Madre Games. Its second edition was solely designed by Wehrle and published in 2019 by Wehrlegig Games. It concerns the Russian, British, and Durrani empires struggling for dominance in Afghanistan, with players assuming the role of local leaders. Pax Pamir received positive reviews upon its release and was nominated for several awards.

== Gameplay ==
The board of Pax Pamir is a map of Central Asia; there is also a market from which cards are bought, and each player has their own tableau of cards, called a court. The map, covering the area from the Caspian Sea to northern Afghanistan and the Punjab, is divided into six areas. Players may place two kinds of pieces on the map: cylinders representing spies and local tribes, and blocks representing imperial power. Upright blocks represent armies, while blocks laid on their side represent roads between regions, which allow armies to move.

Cards in the market are arranged in six columns; freshly drawn from the deck, they are placed in the most expensive empty column, but as other cards are bought, they move to the cheaper columns on the left. Players pay for cards by placing coins on all the cards leading up to the one they buy; for instance, to buy a card in the 3-cost column, they place one coin each on the cards in the 0-cost, 1-cost, and 2-cost columns. When they buy a card, however, they gain all the coins on the card they buy.

Pax Pamir has several types of cards: court cards, event cards, dominance check cards, and a separate deck of cards used in solo play. Court cards are the most common type of card. They are purchased by players and held in hand until played into the player's "court" tableau. Once played, they may have an immediate effect, such as placing pieces on the map, along with providing players with additional action options and, in some cases, special abilities. For example, playing a court card from the Military suit might provide the immediate effect of placing two army blocks on the map and give the player the ability to order armies to march and do battle.

Event cards have a variety of effects that may differ depending on whether the card is purchased by a player or discarded at the end of a round.

Dominance check cards determine when scoring takes place during the game. There are 4 dominance check cards in the game.

Players are not wholly independent of each other but are grouped into three coalitions, supported by and ostensibly working for the Russian, British, and Durrani. Loyalty to a coalition is temporary; it is possible to switch from one to another, and certain cards and actions increase a player's standing with the empire they are allied with. This is relevant when a dominance check occurs: players examine the map to see if any empire has more blocks than the others. If one does, members of its coalition receive victory points, with more favored players gaining more. Otherwise, players with the most cylinders in play gain points.

The game includes a solo mode with an automated opponent, the Wakhan, whose actions are determined by cards.

== Theme ==
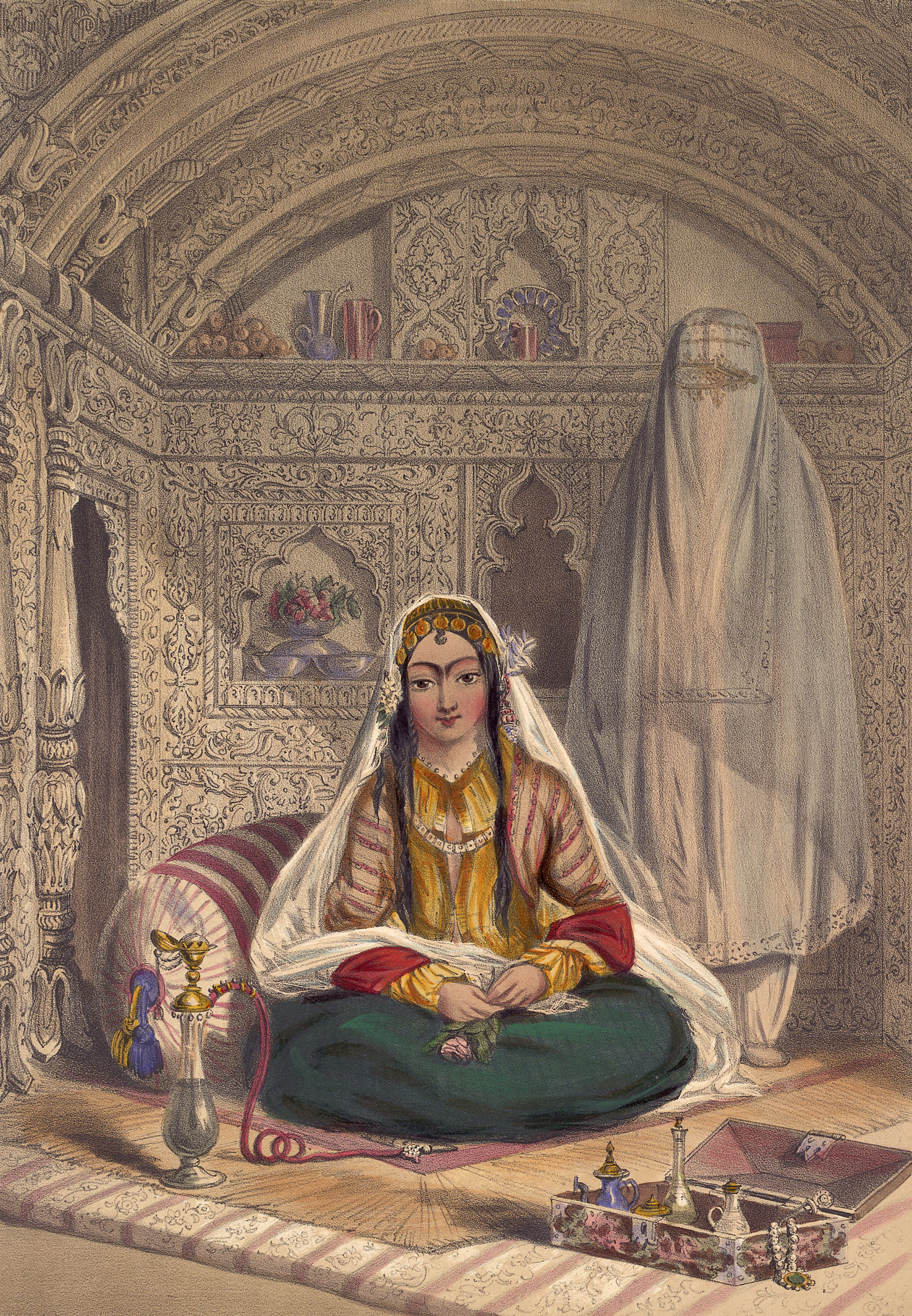
"Ladies of Caubul", an 1848 lithograph by James Rattray showing Shakar Lab, wife of a former governor of Bamiyan. This art is used in the second edition's automated opponent cards.

Pax Pamir is based on Central Asia, beginning in 1823, after the fall of the Durrani Empire. Cards mostly represent individual people, including Afghans such as Dost Mohammed Khan and foreign adventurers such as Vasily Perovsky, but some represent places, institutions, or groups of people. There are cards for the Ark of Bukhara, opium fields, qanats, the East India Company's India Pattern musket, Russian surveyors, British armies in India, and Durrani nobles; there is also one for the literary character Harry Flashman. Research for the game included various popular and scholarly books, such as Peter Hopkirk’s The Great Game, William Dalrymple’s Return of a King, Faiz Muhammad Kateb’s Siraj al-Tawarikh (a history of Afghanistan), and work by Malcolm Yapp, Christopher Bayly, and Frederick Cooper.

Wehrle designed the game to interest players in the topic of empire, and to express a postcolonial viewpoint centered on Afghans. The first paragraph of the rulebook states:

"Western histories often call this period "The Great Game" because of the role played by the Europeans who attempted to use Central Asia as a theater for their own rivalries. In this game, those empires are viewed strictly from the perspective of the Afghans who sought to manipulate the interloping ferengi for their own purposes."

The game’s art is another way of communicating the setting, and almost every card has unique art. Most of the second edition's art was taken from the work of James Atkinson and James Rattray, who had been present in Afghanistan when the game is set. However, it also uses the work of Indian and Persian artists to add to the cosmopolitanism of the art styles. This extends to the box cover, which is purple, a color Wehrle describes as connected to Afghan political power.

== Development history ==
Wehrle began developing the game in 2012, influenced by Pax Porfiriana, which concerned the rule of Porfirio Díaz in Mexico. The first edition was published in 2015 by Sierra Madre Games, co-designed by Phil Eklund, the company's owner and one of the designers of Pax Porfiriana. Described as the second game in the "Pax" series, it was packaged in a small box and used cards for the map. The cover used an 1878 cartoon by John Tenniel for the satirical magazine Punch, showing Amir Sher Ali Khan standing between a lion and bear symbolizing Britain and Russia, with the caption "Save Me From My Friends!" It was published just after Britain invaded Afghanistan, beginning the Second Anglo-Afghan War. Sierra Madre Games released an expansion, Khyber Knives, in 2016.

In 2017, Wehrle began working on a second edition with himself as sole designer. It was published in 2019 by Wehrlegig Games, a company comprising himself and his brother Drew. Differences compared to the previous edition include a larger box, and updated components including redesigned cards and a cloth map.

== Reception ==
The first edition of Pax Pamir was nominated for several awards, including the Golden Geek Award for Best Card Game for the first edition. A Vice article about the cancelled GMT wargame Scramble for Africa mentioned it as a game that took history as a theme while acknowledging the complexity of colonialism and its impact on the modern world. A short essay written by Eklund that was included in the box, titled "A Defense of British Colonialism", was criticised and removed in subsequent printings.

The second edition was nominated for the Golden Geek Awards for Board Game of the Year, Best Strategy Board Game, and Most Innovative Board Game. In addition, Wargamer listed it as one of the best wargames from 2010 to 2020, and Dicebreaker named it one of their games of the year. Reviewers described the second edition as fast-moving and simple to learn, but with a high degree of player interaction and complexity, allowing clever tactics. Some also described it as easier to understand than the first edition. The art and components were also praised. However, some said that it was not for players who disliked harsh games, as players had many opportunities to betray each other.

Referring to its political and historical themes, Colin Campbell of Polygon called it "a long way from the expand and exterminate basis of many colonization-era games", and Dan Thurot of Dicebreaker said that it called for empathy, showing the meaning of living in a land fought over by outside invaders. Adam Factor of Sprites and Dice stated that the game presents a view of history as fluid and conditional rather than a series of grand events.

Pax Pamir has been well received as a solo game. It ranked number 37 in the BoardGameGeek 2024 People's Choice Top 200 Solo Games poll.

== See also ==
- John Company, Root, and Oath: Chronicles of Empire and Exile – other games designed by Cole Wehrle
