= Star Wars: Rebellion (board game) =

2016 strategy board game

The Epic Conflict Between the Galactic Empire and the Rebel Alliance
- Star Wars: Rebellion box art
- Designers: Corey Konieczka
- Publishers: Fantasy Flight Games
- Publication: 2016
- Genres: Board game
- Players: 2–4
- Setup time: 30 minutes
- Playing time: 180–240 minutes (3-4 hours)
- Chance: Medium (Dice, Cards)
- Skills: Strategy; Card Management
- Website: Star Wars: Rebellion

Star Wars: Rebellion is an asymmetrical strategy board game designed by Corey Konieczka and published by Fantasy Flight Games in 2016. The game's setting is inspired by the original Star Wars trilogy. Players control either the Galactic Empire or the Rebel Alliance. Each player pursues a different path to victory, with the Galactic Empire playing seeking to find the Rebel Alliance player's base and destroy it, while the Rebel Alliance player attempts to avoid detection by the Galactic Empire and sabotage their efforts. The game received highly positive reviews and won numerous awards.

== Game overview ==
Star Wars: Rebellion lets players re-enact the "epic conflict" between the Rebel Alliance and the Galactic Empire. Players take control of various prominent characters from the Star Wars saga, sending them on secret missions and leading troops in combat across the galaxy.

The two factions have different strategies and objectives. The Rebel Alliance is vastly outnumbered and cannot survive a head-on fight; instead, it must remain hidden and rely on subterfuge, guerrilla tactics, and diplomacy to undermine the Empire. The Rebels win the game by gaining enough support to start a full-scale galactic revolt and overthrow the Empire.

The Galactic Empire is a vast, tyrannical regime that rules many systems throughout the galaxy with an iron fist. The Imperials can easily build terrifying weapons of war in large quantities. Although their forces are many, their only chance of extinguishing the spark of rebellion is to spread throughout the galaxy, quell uprisings, and search for the hidden Rebel base. They win the game by finding where the Rebel base is located and conquering it.

== Gameplay ==
Each game round is split up into three phases:

1. The Assignment Phase - Each player, starting with the Rebel player, assigns their leaders to missions.
2. The Command Phase - Each player takes turns revealing missions or activating systems to move units.
3. The Refresh Phase - Each player retrieves all their leaders back to their leader pool, draws two mission cards, the Imperial player draws two probe cards, the Rebel player draws an objective card, the time marker advances one, and units are deployed. The Rebel player moves their reputation marker towards the time marker by completing objectives.

If, usually during the command phase, a system contains both Rebel and Imperial units in either the ground or space arenas or both, then combat takes place until both arenas contain only one side's units. Combat involves rolling dice to determine hits and playing tactic cards to perform additional actions in attack and in defense.

The game ends with:

1. An Imperial player victory by them conquering the Rebel base's system, or
2. A Rebel player victory by having the reputation marker and time marker in the same space of the time track.

== Components ==
- A Game Board (split in 2 halves)
- Various cards used for player objectives, missions, actions, tactics, and searching for the rebel base
- Faction mats for each player
- Plastic miniatures representing the Imperial and Rebel fleets
- Cardboard standees representing faction leaders
- Various cardboard markers used to represent and track damage, destroyed systems, faction loyalty, character status, and game progression
- Custom dice used during in-game combat
- A Rules Reference and a Learn to Play booklet

== Expansions ==
The first expansion to Star Wars: Rebellion was Rise of the Empire, released in 2017. This expansion focused on adding characters, units and missions from Rogue One; the expansion also overhauled the combat system known as the new Cinematic Combat system. The expansion was nominated for the 2017 Golden Geek Best Board Game Expansion.

== Awards ==
The game has received multiple awards and honors:

- 2016 UK Games Expo Award for best Board Games with Miniatures.
- Golden Geek Board Game of the Year Nominee
- Golden Geek Best 2-Player Board Game in 2016. Winner
- 2017 Goblin Magnifico Nominee
- 2016 Tric Trac Nominee
- 2016 International Gamers Award - General Strategy: Two-players Nominee
- 2016 Cardboard Republic Immersionist Laurel Nominee
- 2016 Best Science Fiction or Fantasy Board Game Nominee

== Reception ==
The game has received positive reviews. Ars Technica has noted that the game "has a vibrant game system at its core", Polygon has described it as an "epic game, faithful to the spirit of the original films" and "is worth your time" and BGL has mentioned that the game "delivers the most complete Star Wars experience in board games". Meeple Mountain have also positively commented that the "Star Wars: Rebellion not only fits the theme, it NAILS it". As of January 2022, Star Wars Rebellion is ranked among the top ten games on BoardGameGeek, with a mean rating of 8.4/10 according to 26,000 ratings.
