= List of Game of the Year awards (board games) =

List of board games that have won a Game of the Year award

Game of the Year (GotY) is a title awarded annually by various magazines, websites, and game critics to deserving tabletop games, including board games and card games. Many publications award a single "Game of the Year" award to a single title published in the previous year that they feel represents the pinnacle of gaming achievement that year.

== Organizations ==
Organizations and publications that award Game of the Year awards for board games include:

- Two truths and a trash
- Årets spel (Sweden)
- As d'Or / Golden Ace
- BoardGameGeek
- Deutscher Spiele Preis
- Dicebreaker
- Games (magazine)
- Gry-Planszowe.pl / Gra Roku (Poland)
- Le Diamant d'Or
- Origins Award
- Premio JdA (Spain)
- Premio Ludopedia (Brazil)
- Spiel des Jahres
  - Kennerspiel des Jahres
  - Kinderspiel des Jahres
- Spiel Portugal (Portugal)

== Awards ==
=== American Tabletop Awards ===
These are winners of the American Tabletop Awards, a US-based board game award selected by a committee of board game media creators for games released in the previous calendar year.

Early Gamers These are winners in the Early Gamers category, a category for games targeted at people new to board games.

Year	Winner	Designer(s)	Publisher
2025	Captain Flip	Remo Conzadori, Paolo Mori	PlayPunk
2024	Blob Party	Pam Walls	WizKids
2023	boop.	Scott Brady	Smirk & Laughter Games
2022	Happy City	Toshiki Sato, Airu Sato	Gamewright
2021	Abandon All Artichokes	Emma Larkins	Gamewright
2020	Draftosaurus	Antoine Bauza, Corentin Lebrat, Ludovic Maublanc, Théo Rivière	Ankama
2019	Catch the Moon	Fabien Riffaud & Juan Rodriguez	Studio Bombyx

Casual Games These are winners in the Casual Games category, a category intended for gamers of all experience levels.

Year	Winner	Designer(s)	Publisher
2025	The Gang	John Cooper, Kory Heath	Thames & Kosmos
2024	Sea Salt & Paper	Bruno Cathala, Théo Rivière	Bombyx, Pandasaurus Games
2023	Turing Machine	Fabien Gridel, Yoann Levet	Le Scorpion Masqué
2022	Cubitos	John D. Clair	Alderac Entertainment Group
2021	The Crew: The Quest for Planet Nine	Thomas Sing	KOSMOS
2020	ShipShape	Rob Daviau	Calliope Games
2019	The Quacks of Quedlinburg	Wolfgang Warsch	North Star Games

Strategy Games These are winners in the Strategy Games category, a category for games that have additional "complexity, planning requirements, and duration" compared to Casual Games.

Year	Winner	Designer(s)	Publisher
2025	Let’s Go! To Japan	Josh Wood	Alderac Entertainment Group
2024	Thunder Road: Vendetta	Dave Chalker, Brett Myers, Noah Cohen, Rob Daviau, Justin D. Jacobson, Jim Keifer, Brian Neff	Restoration Games
2023	Planet Unknown	Ryan Lambert, Adam Rehberg	Adam’s Apple Games, LLC
2022	Cascadia	Randy Flynn	Flatout Games, Alderac Entertainment Group
2021	Calico	Kevin Russ	Flatout Games
2020	Wingspan	Elizabeth Hargrave	Stonemaier Games
2019	Chronicles of Crime	David Cicurel	Lucky Duck Games

Complex Games These are winners in the Complex Games category, a category intended for "longer-form games that typically appeal to more experienced players".

Year	Winner	Designer(s)	Publisher
2025	Fromage	Matthew O’Malley, Ben Rosset	Road To Infamy Games
2024	The White Castle	Isra C., Shei S.	Devir
2023	Carnegie	Xavier Georges	Pegasus Spiele
2022	Lost Ruins of Arnak	Elwen, Mín	Czech Games Edition
2021	Dominations: Road to Civilization	Éric Dubus, Olivier Melison	Holy Grail Games
2020	The Taverns of Tiefenthal	Wolfgang Warsch	North Star Games
2019	Root	Cole Wehrle	Leder Games

=== As d'Or / Golden Ace ===
These are winners of the As d'Or Award, which is awarded to the best board game of the year submitted at the Cannes International Game Festival.

Year	Category	Winner	Designer(s)	Publisher
2023	As d'Or Jeu de l'année	Akropolis	Jules Messaud	Gigamic
2022	As d'Or Jeu de l'année	7 Wonders: Architects	Antoine Bauza	Repos Production
2021	As d'Or Jeu de l'année	MicroMacro: Crime City	Johannes Sich	Edition Spielwiese
2020	As d'Or Jeu de l'année	Oriflamme	Adrien Hesling, Axel Hesling	Studio H
2019	As d'Or Jeu de l'année	The Mind	Wolfgang Warsch	Oya
2018	As d'Or Jeu de l'année	Azul	Michael Kiesling	Plan B Games
2017	As d'Or Jeu de l'année	Unlock!	Cyril Demaegd et Thomas Cauët et Alice Carroll	Space Cowboys
2016	As d'Or Jeu de l'année	Mysterium	Oleg Sidorenko et Oleksandr Nevskiy	Libellud
2015	As d'Or Jeu de l'année	Colt Express	Christophe Raimbault	Ludonaute
2015	As d'Or Jeu de l'année Grand Prix	Five Tribes	Bruno Cathala	Days of Wonder
2015	As d'Or Jeu de l'année Enfant	La Chasse aux Gigamons	Karim Aouidad, Johann Roussel	Elemon Games
2015	As d'Or Jeu de l'année Prix du Jury	Loony Quest	Laurent Escoffier, David Franck	Libellud

=== Board Game Quest Awards ===
These are winners of the Board Game Quest Game of the Year Award. This award is presented by the Board Game Quest editorial team, a United States-based board game media outlet, to the best board game of the year.

Year	Winner	Designer	Publisher
2023	Thunder Road: Vendetta	Brett Myers, Dave Chalker	Restoration Games
2022	Foundations of Rome	Emerson Matsuuchi	Arcane Wonders
2021	Oath: Chronicles of Empire and Exile	Cole Wehrle	Leder games
2020	Lost Ruins of Arnak	Elwen and Mín	Czech Games Edition
2019	Wingspan	Elizabeth Hargrave	Stonemaier Games
2018	Root	Cole Wehrle	Leder Games
2017	Clans of Caledonia	Juma Al-JouJou	Karma Games
2016	Terraforming Mars	Jacob Fryxelius	Stronghold Games
2015	Pandemic Legacy	Rob Daviau, Matt Leacock	Z-Man Games
2014	Five Tribes	Bruno Cathala	Days of Wonder
2013	Nations	Rustan Håkansson, Nina Håkansson, Einar Rosén, Robert Rosén	Lautapelit.fi

=== Deutscher Spiele Preis ===
The Deutscher Spiele Preis (German for "German Game Prize") is a prestigious award for board games started in 1990 by the German magazine Die Pöppel-Revue, which collects votes from the industry's stores, magazines, professionals and game clubs. The results are announced every October at the Spiel game fair in Essen, Germany. The Essen Feather is awarded at the same ceremony.

Year	Winner	Designer(s)	Publisher
2024	Forest Shuffle	Kosch	Lookout Games
2023	Planet Unknown	Ryan Lambert, Adam Rehberg	Strohmann Games
2022	Ark Nova	Mathias Wigge	Feuerland Spiele [de], Campstone Games
2021	Lost Ruins Of Arnak	Mín & Elwen	Czech Games Edition
2020	The Crew	Thomas Sing	Kosmos
2019	Wingspan	Elizabeth Hargrave	Stonemaier Games
2018	Azul	Michael Kiesling	Plan B Games
2017	Terraforming Mars	Jacob Fryxelius	Stronghold Games
2016	Mombasa	Alexander Pfister	
2015	The Voyages of Marco Polo	Simone Luciani, Daniele Tascini	Hans im Glück Verlags-GmbH
2014	Russian Railroads	Helmut Ohley, Leonhard "Lonny" Orgler	Hans im Glück Verlags-GmbH
2013	Terra Mystica	Jens Drögemüller, Helge Ostertag	Feuerland Spiele
2012	Village	Inka Brand, Markus Brand	Pegasus Spiele
2011	7 Wonders	Antoine Bauza	Repos Production
2010	Fresco	Marcel Süßelbeck, Marco Ruskowski, Wolfgang Panning	Queen Games
2009	Dominion	Donald X. Vaccarino	Hans im Glück Verlags-GmbH
2008	Agricola	Uwe Rosenberg	Lookout Games
2007	The Pillars of the Earth	Michael Rieneck, Stefan Stadler	Kosmos
2006	Caylus	William Attia	Ystari Games
2005	Louis XIV	Rüdiger Dorn	Ravensburger Spieleverlag GmbH
2004	Saint Petersburg	Bernd Brunnhofer	Hans im Glück Verlags-GmbH
2003	Amun-Re	Reiner Knizia	Hans im Glück Verlags-GmbH
2002	Puerto Rico	Andreas Seyfarth	Ravensburger Spieleverlag GmbH
2001	Carcassonne	Klaus-Jürgen Wrede	Hans im Glück Verlags-GmbH
2000	Taj Mahal	Reiner Knizia	alea
1999	Tikal	Michael Kiesling, Wolfgang Kramer	Ravensburger Spieleverlag GmbH
1998	Tigris and Euphrates	Reiner Knizia	Hans im Glück Verlags-GmbH
1997	Löwenherz	Klaus Teuber	Goldsieber Spiele
1996	El Grande	Richard Ulrich, Wolfgang Kramer	Hans im Glück Verlags-GmbH
1995	The Settlers of Catan	Klaus Teuber	Franckh
1994	6 nimmt!	Wolfgang Kramer	AMIGO Spiel + Freizeit GmbH
1993	Modern Art	Reiner Knizia	Hans im Glück Verlags-GmbH
1992	Flying Dutchman	Klaus Teuber	Parker Brothers
1991	Master Labyrinth	Max J. Kobbert	Ravensburger Spieleverlag GmbH
1990	Hoity Toity	Klaus Teuber	F.X. Schmid

=== Diamond Climber Awards ===
These are winners of the Diamond Climber Awards, awarded to the best board games of the year by Meeple Mountain, a United States-based board game media outlet. Even though the nominees of 2021 were revealed they haven't announced the winner. No 2022 nominees were given

Year	Category	Winner	Designer(s)	Publisher
2020	Game of the Year	Calico	Kevin Russ	Flatout Games
2020	Best Heavy Strategy / Euro Game	On Mars	Vital Lacerda	Eagle-Gryphon Games
2020	Best Two Player Game	The Shores of Tripoli	Kevin Bertram	Fort Circle Games
2020	Best Solo Game	Under Falling Skies	Tomáš Uhlíř	Czech Games Edition
2020	Best Co-op Game	Gloomhaven: Jaws of the Lion	Isaac Childres	Cephalofair Games
2020	Best Family Game	Calico	Kevin Russ	Flatout Games
2020	Best Light Game	Village Green	Peer Sylvester	Osprey Games
2020	Best Artwork	On Mars	Vital Lacerda	Eagle-Gryphon Games
2019	Game of the Year	Wingspan	Elizabeth Hargrave	Stonemaier Games
2019	Best Gateway Game	Tiny Towns	Peter McPherson	Alderac Entertainment Group
2019	Best Family Game	Tiny Towns	Peter McPherson	Alderac Entertainment Group
2019	Best Artwork	Wingspan	Elizabeth Hargrave	Stonemaier Games
2019	Best Two Player Game	SHŌBU	Jamie Sajdak, Manolis Vranas	Smirk & Laughter Games
2019	Best Thematic Game	Horrified	Prospero Hall	Ravensburger Spieleverlag GmbH
2019	Best RPG	Star Crossed	Alex Roberts	Bully Pulpit Games
2019	Best Light Game	Point Salad	Molly Johnson, Robert Melvin, Shawn Stankewich	Alderac Entertainment Group
2019	Best Euro Game	Paladins of the West Kingdom	Shem Phillips	Renegade Game Studios
2019	Best Co-op Game	Horrified	Prospero Hall	Ravensburger Spieleverlag GmbH
2018	Game of the Year	Root	Cole Wehrle	Leder Games
2018	Best Gateway Game	Reef	Emerson Matsuuchi	Next Move Games
2018	Best Thematic Game	Who Goes There?	Anthony Coffey, Jesse Labbe	Certifiable Studios
2018	Best Euro Game	Coimbra	Flaminia Brasini, Virginio Gigli	eggertspiele
2018	Best RPG	Kids on Bikes	Jonathan Gilmour, Doug Levandowski	Renegade Game Studios
2018	Best Filler Game	The Mind	Wolfgang Warsch	Nürnberger-Spielkarten-Verlag
2018	Best Family Game	Drop It	Bernhard Lach, Uwe Rapp	KOSMOS
2018	Best Co-op Game	Chronicles of Crime	David Cicurel	Lucky Duck Games
2018	Best Artwork	Root	Cole Wehrle	Leder Games

=== Dice Tower Annual Awards ===
The Dice Tower (a website, podcast and video network founded by Tom Vasel) has been announcing awards since 2007.

=== ENnie Awards ===
The annual ENnie Awards (previously known as the Gen Con EN World RPG Awards) are annual, fan-based awards for role-playing game products and publishers hosted at Gen Con in Indianapolis, Indiana. The name of the award is derived from the EN World website that hosted the awards from their inception in 2001 until 2018, and retains the name, although is no longer part of EN World. The ENnies were created by Russ Morrissey and Eric Noah and were run and owned by Morrissey until 2018.

=== Jogo do Ano ===
These are winners of the Jogo do Ano, awarded to the best board games of the year submitted to Spiel Portugal.

Year	Winner	Designer(s)	Publisher
2023	Carnegie	Xavier Georges	Quined Games
2022	Imperial Steam	Alexander Huemer	Capstone Games
2021	Imperial Struggle	Ananda Gupta, Jason Matthews	GMT Game
2020	Barrage	Tommaso Battista, Simone Luciani	Cranio Creations
2019	Root	Cole Wehrle	Leder Games
2018	Lisboa	Vital Lacerda	Eagle-Gryphon Games
2017	Great Western Trail	Alexander Pfister	Stronghold Games
2016	Mombasa	Alexander Pfister	eggertspiele & Pegasus Spiele
2015	La Granja	Michael Keller and Andreas Odendahl	Spielworxx
2014	Nations	Rustan Håkansson, Nina Håkansson, Einar Rosén and Robert Rosén	Lautapelit.fi
2012	Keyflower	Sebastian Bleasdale and Richard Breese	R&D Games
2011	Ora et Labora	Uwe Rosenberg	Lookout Games
2010	Troyes	Sébastien Dujardin, Xavier Georges and Alain Orban	Z-Man Games
2009	Maria	Richard Sivél	Histogame
2008	Agricola	Uwe Rosenberg	Lookout Games
2007	Brass	Martin Wallace	Eagle-Gryphon Games
2006	Imperial	Mac Gerdts	eggertspiele

=== Games magazine ===
The winners of Games magazine's Game of the Year award are chosen by Games editors.

Year	Game of the Year	Designer(s)	Publisher
2014	Garden Dice/The Card Expansion	Doug Bass	Meridae Games
2013	Trajan	Stefan Feld	Ammonit Spiele
2012	Tikal II: The Lost Temple	Wolfgang Kramer and Michael Kiesling	Asmodée Editions
2011	Jump Gate	Matt Worden	Matt Worden Games
2010	Small World	Philippe Keyaerts	Days of Wonder
2009	Tzaar	Kris Burm	Rio Grande Games
2008	Pillars of the Earth	Michael Rieneck and Stefan Stadler	Mayfair Games
2007	Vegas Showdown	Henry Stern	Avalon Hill
2006	Australia	Wolfgang Kramer and Michael Kiesling	Rio Grande Games
2005	BuyWord	Sid Sackson	Face2Face Games
2004	New England	Alan Moon and Aaron Weissblum	Überplay
2003	DVONN	Kris Burm	Rio Grande Games
2002	Evo	Philippe Keyaerts	Eurogames-Descartes USA
2001	Aladdin's Dragons	Richard Breese	Rio Grande Games
2000	Torres	Wolfgang Kramer and Michael Kiesling	Rio Grande Games
1999	Fossil	Klaus Palesch	Rio Grande Games
1998	Quoridor	Mirko Marchesi	Great American Trading Co.
1997	25 Words or Less	Bruce Sterten	Winning Moves
1995	Sharp Shooters	Jeffrey Breslow, Howard J. Morrison, Rouben Terzian	Milton Bradley
1994	Myst	Robyn Miller and Rand Miller |Broderbund	University Games
1993	Inklings		Mattel
1992	Pipeline	Ryan Courtney	Playco Hawaii
1991	Trumpet	Phil Orbanes Sr.	International Games

=== Golden Geek Award (2020 onwards) ===
After the 2019 Golden Geek Awards, it was decided to replace "Board Game of the Year", "Best Strategy Board Game" and "Best Family Board Game" with "Light Game of the Year", "Medium Game of the Year" and "Heavy Game of the Year". Splitting it into 3 different categories.

Year	Light	Medium	Heavy
2022	Cat in the Box: Deluxe Edition	Heat: Pedal to the Metal	Carnegie
2021	Cascadia	The Crew: Mission Deep Sea	Ark Nova
2020	MicroMacro: Crime City	Lost Ruins of Arnak	Gloomhaven: Jaws of the Lion

=== Golden Geek Award (Till 2019) ===
The BoardGameGeek Golden Geek Award was originally presented at the BGG.CON event in November, but is currently announced annually in March. The winners of the Golden Geek are selected by the nomination and voting of the user community of BoardGameGeek.com website.

Year	Winner	Designer(s)	Publisher
2019	Wingspan	Elizabeth Hargrave	Stonemaier Games
2018	Root	Cole Wehrle	Leder Games
2017	Gloomhaven	Isaac Childres	Cephalofair Games
2016	Scythe	Jamey Stegmaier	Stonemaier Games
2015	Pandemic Legacy: Season 1	Matt Leacock, Rob Daviau	Z-Man Games
2014	Splendor	Marc André	Space Cowboys
2013	Terra Mystica	Helge Ostertag, Jens Drögemüller	Feuerland Spiele
2012	Eclipse	Touko Tahkokallio	Lautapelit.fi
2011	Dominant Species	Chad Jensen	GMT Games
2010	Hansa Teutonica	Andreas Steding	Argentum Verlag
2009	Dominion	Donald X. Vaccarino	Rio Grande Games
2008	Agricola	Uwe Rosenberg	Lookout Games
2007	Shogun	Dirk Henn	Queen Games
2006	Caylus	William Attia	Ẏstari Games

=== Gra Roku ===
Gra Roku is a Polish award (the name of the award literally means "Game of the Year" in Polish) awarded since 2004 by the Gry-Planszowe.pl portal.

=== Le Diamant d'Or ===
Each year a list of around fifty “expert” management games known as eurogames, chosen and tested by a large number of pre-selectors, brings out eight games among which the Golden Diamond jury establishes a ranking and devotes the prize to the best game of the year category expert to their favorite.

Year	Diamant d'or	Diamant d'argent	Diamant de bronze
2022	Ark Nova	Coffee Traders	Imperial Steam
2021	Beyond the Sun	Praga Caput Regni	Bonfire
2020	Crystal Palace	On Mars	Barrage
2019	Underwater Cities	Newton	Prehistory
2018	Project Gaia	Lisboa	Spirit Island
2017	Great Western Trail	Terraforming Mars	Yokohama
2015/16	Mombasa	Tuscany	The Gallerist

=== Mensa Select ===
These are the winners of Mensa Select Award, for the five best board games of the year submitted to Mensa Mind Games.

Year	Winner	Designer(s)	Publisher
2023	Trekking Through History	Charlie Bink	Underdog Games
2023	Mille Fiori	Reiner Knizia	Devir Games
2023	Gartenbau	David Abelson, Alex Johns	25th Century Games
2023	Akropolis	Jules Messaud	Hachette Boardgames
2023	boop	Scott Brady	Smirk & Dagger Games
2022	Atheneum: Mystic Library	L'Atelier	Renegade Game Studios
2022	Genotype: A Mendelian Genetics Game	John Coveyou, Paul Salomon, Ian Zang	Genius Games LLC
2022	Life of a Chameleon	Nathan Jenne, Jake Jenne	Last Night Games
2022	Miyabi	Michael Kiesling	HABA
2022	Shifting Stones	J. Evan Raitt	Gamewright
2021	Bermuda Pirates	Jeppe Norsker	FoxMind Games
2021	ClipCut Parks	Shaun Graham, Scott Huntington	Renegade Game Studios
2021	Gates of Delirium	Jordan Goddard, Mandy Goddard	Renegade Game Studios
2021	Gridopolis		Gridopolis Games
2021	Ishtar: Gardens of Babylon	Bruno Cathala, Evan Singh	IELLO USA
2021	Kodama 3D	Daryl Andrews, Erica Bouyouris	Indie Boards and Cards
2021	Mental Blocks	Jonathan Gilmour, Micah Sawyer	Pandasaurus Games
2021	Stripes	Maxine Ekl	Breaking Games
2021	Village Pillage	Peter C. Hayward, Tom Lang	Jellybean Games
2021	WHO KNOWS WHO		Digby Doo
2019	Architects of the West Kingdom	Shem Phillips, S J Macdonald	Renegade Game Studios
2019	Gizmos	Phil Walker-Harding	CMON
2019	Gunkimono	Jeffrey D. Allers	Renegade Game Studios
2019	Planet	Urtis Šulinskas	Blue Orange Games
2019	Victorian Masterminds	Antoine Bauza, Eric M. Lang	CMON
2015	Trekking the National Parks	Charlie Bink	Bink Inc LLC
2015	Letter Tycoon	Brad Brooks	Breaking Games
2015	Lanterns: The Harvest Festival	Christopher Chung	Renegade Game Studio
2015	Dragonwood :A Game of Dice & Daring	Darren Kisgen	Gamewright Inc.
2015	Castles of Mad King Ludwig	Ted Alspach	Bezier Games
2014	Euphoria	Jamie Stegmaier	Stonemaier Games
2014	Gravwell: Escape from the 9th Dimension	Corey Young	Cryptozoic Entertainment
2014	Pyramix	Tim Roediger	Gamewright
2014	Qwixx	Steffen Benndorf	Gamewright
2014	The Duke	Jeremy Holcomb	Catalyst Game Labs
2013	Forbidden Desert	Matt Leacock	Gamewright
2013	Ghooost!	Richard Garfield	Iello
2013	Kerflip	Damon Tabb	Creative Foundry Games
2013	Kulami	Andreas Kuhnekath	Foxmind Games
2013	Suburbia	Ted Alspach	Bezier Games
2012	Coerceo	Erik Gortzen	Coerceo Company
2012	Iota	Gene Mackles	Iota
2012	Mine Shift	John Forte, Jr	Mindware
2012	Snake Oil	Jeff Ochs	Snake Oil, LLC
2012	Tetris Link	(uncredited)	TechnoSource
2011	Instructures	Jane Mathews	Jane's Games
2011	Pastiche	Sean D MacDonald	Gryphon Games
2011	Pirate vs Pirate	Max Winter Osterhaus	Out of the Box
2011	Stomple	Greg Zima	GaZima Games
2011	Uncle Chestnut's Table Gype	Paul E Nowak and Christopher Nowak	Eternal Revolution
2010	Anomia	Andrew Innes	Anomia Press
2010	Dizios	Nicholas Cravotta	MindWare
2010	Forbidden Island	Matt Leacock	Gamewright
2010	Word on the Street	Jack Degnan	Out of the Box
2010	Yikerz!	(uncredited)	Wiggles 3D Incorporated
2009	Cornerstone	Matt Mette	Good Company Games
2009	Dominion	Donald X. Vaccarino	Rio Grande Games
2009	Marrakech	Dominique Ehrhard	Fundex
2009	Stratum	Jose' L Navas	Family Games America, Inc
2009	Tic-Tac-Ku	Mark Asperheim and Cris Van Oosterum	Mad Cave Bird Games
2008	AmuseAmaze	Ethan Goffman	HL Games
2008	Eye Know	Paul Berton and George Sinclair	Wiggles 3D Inc
2008	Jumbulaya	Julie Archer and Karl Archer	Platypus Games
2008	Pixel	Ariel Laden	Educational Insights
2008	Tiki Topple	Keith Meyers	Gamewright
2007	Gemlok	Donald Meyer	Pywacket Games
2007	Gheos	Rene' Wiersma	Z-Man Games
2007	Hit or Miss	Garrett J. Donner, Brian S. Spence, and Michael S. Steer	Gamewright
2007	Qwirkle	Susan McKinley Ross	MindWare
2007	Skullduggery	K. Allegra Vernon	Outset Media Games
2006	Deflexion (aka Khet)	Luke Hooper, Michael Larson, and Del Segura	Deflexion
2006	Hive	John Yianni	Smart Zone Games
2006	Keesdrow	Donald Meyer	Pywacket
2006	Pentago	Tomas Floden	Mindtwister USA
2006	Wits & Wagers	Dominic Crapuchettes	North Star Games
2005	DaVinci's Challenge	Paul Micarelli	Briarpatch
2005	Ingenious	Reiner Knizia	Fantasy Flight Games
2005	Loot	Reiner Knizia	Gamewright
2005	Niagara	Thomas Liesching	Rio Grande Games
2005	Zendo	Kory Heath	Looney Labs
2004	10 Days in Africa/USA	Alan Moon and Aaron Weissblum	Out of the Box
2004	Basari	Reinhard Staupe	Out of the Box
2004	The Bridges of Shangri-La	Leo Colovini	Uberplay Entertainment
2004	Rumis	Stefan Kogl	Educational Insights
2004	Yinsh	Kris Burm	Rio Grande Games
2003	Blokus	Bernard Tavitian	Educational Insights
2003	Cityscape	Sjaak Griffioen	Out of the Box
2003	Fire & Ice	Jens-Peter Schliemann	Out of the Box
2003	Octiles	Dale Walton	Out of the Box
2003	TransAmerica	Franz-Benno Delonge	Rio Grande Games
2002	Curses!	Brian Tinsman	Play All Day Games
2002	Dvonn	Kris Burm	Rio Grande Games
2002	The Legend of Landlock	Edith Schlichting	Gamewright
2002	Muggins!	(uncredited)	Muggins Math
2002	Smart Mouth	Theo Coster, Ora Coster, and Theora Design	Binary Arts
2001	Brainstrain	DJ Calhoun	Chuckle Games Company
2001	Dao	Jeff Pickering and Ben VanBuskirk	Playdao.com
2001	Metro	Dirk Henn	Queen Games
2001	Shapes Up!	(uncredited)	Educational Insights
2001	The Poll Game	Eric Martin and Jeff Snow	Thepollgame, LLC
2000	3 Stones	Andy Daniel	Enginuity Games
2000	Finish Lines	Joan Moravick	Games For All Reasons
2000	Imaginiff	Jack Lawson and Andrew Lawson	Buffalo Games
2000	Time's Up!	Peter Sarrett	R&R Games
2000	Zertz	Kris Burm	Schmidt International/Rio Grande Games
1999	Apples to Apples	Matthew Kirby	Out of the Box
1999	Bollox (Bōku)	Rob Nelson	Cadaco
1999	Doubles Wild	Andy Daniel	Enginuity Games
1999	Fluxx	Andrew Looney	Looney Labs
1999	Quiddler	Marsha Falco	Set Enterprises
1998	Avalam	Philippe Deweys	Great American Trading Company
1998	Cube Checkers	Gillespie and Rolling	DCP Limited
1998	Kram	Mark Blazczyk	Du Botting Originals
1998	Spy Alley	William Stephenson	Spy Alley Partners
1998	Wadjet	Dee Pomerleau	Timbuk II
1997	Hattrick!	Björn Holmér	US Games Systems
1997	Quoridor	Mirko Marchesi	Great American Trading Company
1997	Rush Hour	Nob Yoshigahara	Think Fun (Binary Arts)
1997	Sagarian	Jason Yearout	Sagarian
1997	Stops	Don Kimball	Stops
1996	Pirateer	Scott Peterson	Mendocino Game Company
1996	Quadwrangle	Maureen Hiron	Great American Trading Company
1996	Rat-a-Tat Cat	Ann and Monty Stambler	Gamewright
1996	6 nimmt!	Wolfgang Kramer	US Games Systems
1996	Touche'	Wayne Bobette	Wayne Bobette Enterprises
1995	Continuo	Maureen Hiron	US Games Systems
1995	Duo	Maureen Hiron	US Games Systems
1995	Quixo	Thierry Chapeau	Great American Trading Company
1995	The Great Dalmuti	Richard Garfield	Wizards of the Coast
1995	Word Spin Scramble		Geospace Products Co, Inc
1994	Char	Frank Bechter	Bechter Productions, Inc.
1994	Chung Toi	W. Reginald Chung	House of Chung Enterprises
1994	Down Fall		Western Publishing, Inc.
1994	Magic: The Gathering	Richard Garfield	Wizards of the Coast
1994	Pyraos (aka Pylos)	David G. Royffe	Great American Trading Co.
1993	Farook	Stewart M. Lamle	Amuse, Inc.
1993	Inklings		Mattel
1993	Overturn	Ron and Pat Dubren	Pressman
1993	Quadrature	Mark Steere	Mark Steere Games
1993	Quarto!	Blaise Muller	Gigamic
1992	Kinesis	Adam Byer	Cherry Street Games
1992	Q4		Abalone Games Corp
1992	Terrace	Anton Dresden	Siler/Siler Ventures
1992	Traverse	Michael Kuby, John Miller	Educational Insights
1992	Why Not?	Herman Erikson	Our Game Company
1991	Clue: The Great Museum Caper	John Labelle, Thomas and Dave Rabideau	Parker Brothers
1991	Lapis	Suzanne Gautier	Pango, Inc
1991	Master Labyrinth	Max J. Kobbert	International Playthings
1991	Pyramis	Murray J. Gould, James R. Longacre	Abalone Games Corp
1991	Set	Marsha J. Falco	Set Enterprises
1990	Abalone	Michael Lalet, Laurent Levi	Abalone Games Corp
1990	Scattergories		Milton Bradley
1990	Taboo	Brian Hersch	Milton Bradley
1990	TriBond	Ed Muccini, Tim Walsh, Dave Yearick	Big Fun A Go-Go
1990	Trivial Pursuit: Genus Edition	Scott Abbot, Chris Haney	Parker Brothers

=== Origin Awards ===
The Origins Awards are American awards for outstanding work in the game industry. They are presented by the Academy of Adventure Gaming Arts and Design at the Origins Game Fair on an annual basis for the previous year; for example, the 1979 awards were given at the 1980 Origins. Categories for the Origins award can vary from year to year, and there is not a "Game of the Year" per se.

The Origins Award is commonly referred to as a Calliope, as the statuette is in the likeness of the muse of the same name. Academy members frequently shorten this name to "Callie".

=== Premio JdA ===
This award is for Game of the Year in Spain, "Premio al Juego de mesa del año" (Premio JdA), by an independent jury of game industry representatives.

Year	Winner	Designer	Spanish publisher
2023	SCOUT	Kei Kajino (梶野 桂)	Gen X Games
2022	Hibachi	Marco Teubner	Arrakis Games
2021	Kingdom Builder	Donald X. Vaccarino	Devir
2020	La Tripulación	Thomas Sing	Devir
2019	El Dorado	Reiner Knizia	Ravensburger
2018	Azul	Michael Kiesling	Plan B - Asmodee
2017	Dice Forge	Régis Bonnessée	Morapiaf
2016	Pandemic Legacy	Rob Daviau & Matt Leacock	Devir
2015	Colt Express	Christophe Raimbault	Ludonaute - Asmodee
2014	Jaipur	Sébastien Pauchon	GameWorks - Asmodee
2013	Las Leyendas de Andor	Michael Menzel	Devir
2012	Santiago de Cuba	Michael Rienack	Ludonova
2011	La Isla Prohibida	Matt Leacock	Devir
2010	Fauna	Friedemann Friese	Homoludicus
2009	Dixit	Jean-Ñouis Roubira	Morapiaf
2008	Agricola	Uwe Rosenberg	Homoludicus
2007	Los pilares de la Tierra	Michael Rieneck & Stefan Stadler	Devir
2006	Exploradores	Reiner Knizia	Devir
2005	¡Aventureros al tren!	Alan R. Moon	Edge Entertainment

=== Spiel des Jahres ===
These games are winners of the Spiel des Jahres, a German board game award widely considered the most prestigious in the industry.

Year	Winner	Designer	Publisher
2025	Bomb Busters	Hisashi Hayashi	Pegasus Spiele
2024	Sky Team	Luc Rémond	Cosmos / Scorpion Masqué
2023	Dorfromantik	Michael Palm, Lukas Zach	Pegasus Spiele
2022	Cascadia	Randy Flynn	Flatout Games, AEG, Kosmos
2021	Micromacro: Crime City	Johannes Sich	Edition Spielwiese
2020	Pictures	Daniela Stöhr and Christian Stöhr	PD-Verlag and Rio Grande Games
2019	Just One	Ludovic Roudy and Bruno Sautter	Repos Production
2018	Azul	Michael Kiesling	Next Move/Plan B Games
2017	Kingdomino	Bruno Cathala	Blue Orange Games
2016	Codenames	Vlaada Chvátil	Czech Games Edition
2015	Colt Express	Christophe Raimbault	Ludonaute
2014	Camel Up	Steffen Bogen	Eggertspiele
2013	Hanabi	Antoine Bauza	Asmodée Éditions
2012	Kingdom Builder	Donald X. Vaccarino	Queen Games
2011	Qwirkle	Susan McKinley Ross	MindWare
2010	Dixit	Jean-Louis Roubira	Libellud
2009	Dominion	Donald X. Vaccarino	Rio Grande Games
2008	Keltis	Reiner Knizia	Kosmos
2007	Zooloretto	Michael Schacht	Abacus Spiele
2006	Thurn and Taxis	Andreas Seyfarth and Karen Seyfarth	Hans im Glück
2005	Niagara	Thomas Liesching	Zoch Verlag
2004	Ticket to Ride	Alan R. Moon	Days of Wonder
2003	Alhambra	Dirk Henn	Queen Games
2002	Villa Paletti	Bill Payne	Zoch Verlag
2001	Carcassonne	Klaus-Jürgen Wrede	Hans im Glück
2000	Torres	Wolfgang Kramer and Michael Kiesling	Ravensburger
1999	Tikal	Wolfgang Kramer and Michael Kiesling	Ravensburger
1998	Elfenland	Alan R. Moon	Amigo Spiele
1997	Mississippi Queen	Werner Hodel	Goldsieber
1996	El Grande	Wolfgang Kramer and Richard Ulrich	Hans im Glück
1995	The Settlers of Catan	Klaus Teuber	Kosmos
1994	Manhattan	Andreas Seyfarth	Hans im Glück
1993	Call My Bluff	Richard Borg	F.X. Schmid
1992	Um Reifenbreite	Rob Bontenbal	Jumbo
1991	Drunter und Drüber	Klaus Teuber	Hans im Glück
1990	Hoity Toity	Klaus Teuber	F.X. Schmid
1989	Café International	Rudi Hoffmann	Mattel
1988	Barbarossa	Klaus Teuber	Altenburger und Stralsunder
1987	Auf Achse	Wolfgang Kramer	F.X. Schmid
1986	Top Secret Spies	Wolfgang Kramer	Ravensburger
1985	Sherlock Holmes: Consulting Detective	Raymond Edwards, Suzanne Goldberg and Gary Grady	Kosmos
1984	Railway Rivals	David Watts	Schmidt Spiele
1983	Scotland Yard	Werner Schlegel, Dorothy Garrels, Fritz Ifland, Manfred Burggraf, Werner Scheerer and Wolf Hoermann	Ravensburger
1982	Enchanted Forest	Alex Randolph and Michel Matschoss	Ravensburger
1981	Focus	Sid Sackson	Parker Brothers
1980	Rummikub	Ephraim Hertzano	Intelli
1979	Hare and Tortoise	David Parlett	Ravensburger

==== Kennerspiel des Jahres ====
These are winners of Kennerspiel des Jahres, an expansion of the German Spiel des Jahres board game award starting in 2011. It translates to "connoisseur/expert game of the year" and is meant for more experienced gamers.

Year	Winner	Designer(s)	Publisher
2025	Endeavor: Deep Sea	Carl de Visser and Jarratt Gray	Frosted Games, Board Game Circus, Burnt Island Games, Grand Gamers Guild
2024	Daybreak	Matt Leacock and Matteo Menapace	Schmidt Spiele
2023	Challengers!	Johannes Krenner, Markus Slawitscheck	1 More Time Games, Z-Man Games
2022	Living Forest	Aske Christiansen	Pegasus Spiele, Ludonaute
2021	Paleo	Peter Rustemeyer	Hans im Glück
2019	Wingspan	Elizabeth Hargrave	Stonemaier Games
2018	Die Quacksalber von Quedlinburg	Wolfgang Warsch	Schmidt Spiele
2017	EXIT: The Game	Inka Brand and Markus Brand	Kosmos
2016	Isle of Skye: From Chieftain to King	Andreas Pelikan and Alexander Pfister	Mayfair Games
2015	Broom Service	Andreas Pelikan and Alexander Pfister	alea, Ravensburger
2014	Istanbul	Rüdiger Dorn	Pegasus Spiele
2013	Legends of Andor	Michael Menzel	Fantasy Flight Games
2012	Village	Inka Brand and Markus Brand	Pegasus Spiele
2011	7 Wonders	Antoine Bauza	Repos Production

==== Kinderspiel des Jahres ====
The Kinderspiel des Jahres is awarded annually to the best children's game by a jury of German game critics. This award is to children's games what the Spiel des Jahres is to family games.

2001 was the first year that the Kinderspiel des Jahres was officially awarded. Prior to that year, it was a subcategory of the Spiel des Jahres awards known as the Sonderpreis "Kinderspiel" ("Special Prize for Best Children's Game"). Since the intent behind both awards is the same, it is customary to refer to the 1989–2000 Sonderpreis winners as having won the Kinderspiel des Jahres.

Year	Winner	Designer(s)	Publisher
2025	Top the cake	Wolfgang Warsch	Schmidt Spiele
2024	The Magic Keys	Markus Slawitscheck und Arno Steinwender	Game Factory / Happy Baobab
2023	Mysterium Kids	Antonin Boccara, Yves Hirschfeld	Libellud, Space Cow
2022	Magic Mountain	Jens-Peter Schliemann, Bernhard Weber	Amigo
2021	Dragomino	Bruno Cathala, Marie Fort, Wilfried Fort	Pegasus games
2020	Speedy Roll	Urtis Silinskas	Piatnik
2019	Valley of the Vikings	Marie and Wilfried Fort	Haba
2018	Funkelschatz	Lena und Günter Burkhardt	Haba
2017	Ice Cool	Brian Gomez	Brain Games
2016	My First Stone Age	Marco Teubner	--
2015	Spinderella	Roberto Fraga	--
2014	Geister, Geister, Schatzsuchmeister!	Brian Yu	--
2013	Der verzauberte Turm	Inka Brand and Markus Brand	--
2012	Schnappt Hubi!	Steffen Bogen	--
2011	Da ist der Wurm drin	Carmen Kleinert	--
2010	Diego Drachenzahn	Manfred Ludwig	--
2009	Das magische Labyrinth	Dirk Baumann	--
2008	Wer war's?	Reiner Knizia	--
2007	Beppo der Bock	Klaus Zoch and Peter Schackert	--
2006	Der schwarze Pirat	Guido Hoffmann	--
2005	Das Kleine Gespenst	Kai Haferkamp	--
2004	Spooky Stairs	Michelle Schanen	--
2003	Viva Topo!	Manfred Ludwig	--
2002	Maskenball der Käfer	Peter-Paul Joopen	--
2001	Klondike	Stefanie Rohner and Christian Wolf	--
2000	Arbos	Martin Arnold and Armin Müller	--
1999	Kayanak	Peter-Paul Joopen	--
1998	Chicken Cha Cha Cha	Klaus Zoch	--
1997	Leinen los!	Alex Randolph	--
1996	Vier zu mir!	Heike Baum	--
1995	Karambolage	Heinz Meister	--
1994	Loopin' Louie	Carol Wiseley	--
1993	Ringel-Rangel	Geni Wyss	--
1992	Galloping Pigs	Heinz Meister	--
1991	Piraten-Abenteuer	Wolfgang Kramer	--
1990	My Haunted Castle	Virginia Charves	--
1989	Gute Freunde	Alex Randolph	--

== See also ==
- Board game
- Lists of awards
- List of game awards
- Board game awards
