= 2020 in games =

This page lists board and card games, wargames, miniatures games, and tabletop role-playing games published in 2020. For video games, see 2020 in video gaming.

== Games released or invented in 2020 ==
- Calico
- Oceans
- Tellstones: King's Gambit
- Undaunted: North Africa
- Eclipse: Second Dawn for The Galaxy
- Hansa Teutonica: Big Box

== Game awards given in 2020 ==
- Barrage won the Spiel Portugal Jogo do Ano.

== Deaths ==
Date	Name	Age	Notability
January 29	Kim Eastland	67	Game designer for TSR
February 17	Scott Palter		Founder of West End Games
March 24	Albert Uderzo	92	Comics artist who also illustrated tabletop games
March 27	Brian Blume	70	Co-founder of TSR
May 12	Frank Bolle	95	Comics artist with many Choose Your Own Adventure credits
May 18	Neil Rabens	90	Co-designer of Twister
May 25	Arnold Hendrick		Designer and developer of RPGs, board games and video games
June 28	Jim Holloway		Role-playing game artist
September	Martin McKenna	51	Artist for Games Workshop
October 23	Lenard Lakofka		Influence on Greyhawk

== See also ==
- List of game manufacturers
- 2020 in video gaming
