= 1991 in games =

This page lists board and card games, wargames, miniatures games, and tabletop role-playing games published in 1991. For video games, see 1991 in video gaming.

== Games released or invented in 1991 ==
- Advanced Civilization
- Amber Diceless Roleplaying Game
- Car Wars: The Card Game
- Cosmic Encounter (Mayfair Games version, originally released in 1977 by Eon Games)
- Dark Conspiracy (role-playing game)
- Drunter und Drüber
- Falsies
- Formula Dé
- Greyhawk Wars
- HeroQuest Kellar's Keep (expansion)
- HeroQuest Return of the Witch Lord (expansion)
- History of the World
- Icehouse
- Midway
- Millennium's End (role-playing game)
- MindTrap
- More Dirty Minds
- Nightmare (later renamed Atmosfear)
- Outpost
- Rave
- Reich Star (role-playing game)
- Set
- Space Fleet
- Starship Command
- Tales from the Floating Vagabond (role-playing game)
- Tantrix
- Tichu
- Time Lord (role-playing game)
- Ultra Marines
- Vampire: The Masquerade

== Game awards given in 1991 ==
- Spiel des Jahres: Drunter und Drüber
- Deutscher Spiele Preis: Master Labyrinth
- Origins Awards:
  - Best Roleplaying Rules: Vampire: The Masquerade
  - Best Pre-20th Century Boardgame: Blackbeard
  - Best Modern-day Boardgame: East Front
  - Best Fantasy or Science Fiction Boardgame: Cosmic Encounter
  - Best Roleplaying Supplement: GURPS Time Travel
  - Best Roleplaying Adventure: Horror on the Orient Express (for Call of Cthulhu)
- Games: Trumpet

== Significant game-related events in 1991 ==
- White Wolf, Inc. was founded.

== See also ==
- 1991 in video gaming
