= Hues and Cues =

2020 party game

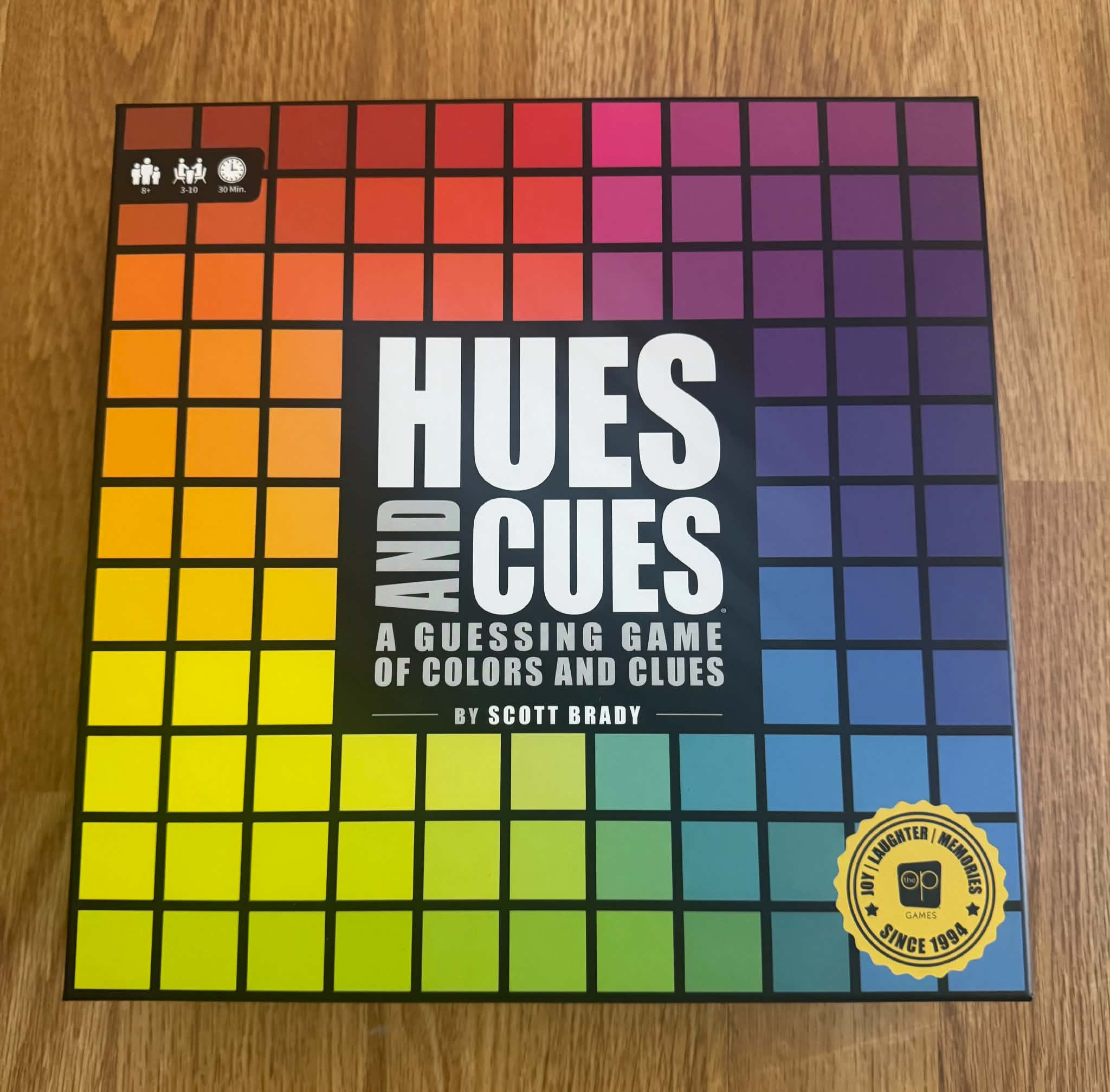
- Designers: Scott Brady
- Publishers: The Op Games
- Publication: 2020; 6 years ago
- Genres: Deduction game; Party game
- Players: 3–10
- Playing time: 30 minutes
- Age range: 8+

Hues and Cues is a deduction party game designed by Scott Brady and published by The Op Games in 2020. Players take turns giving 1–2 word hints to get other players to guess a specific color on a game board of different 480 hues.

== Publishing history ==
The design of Hues and Cues was inspired by Scott Brady's experience working in the printing industry and the abstract ways customers would describe color. It was published in early 2020 by The Op Games after a meeting with Brady at the Origins Game Fair.

== Gameplay ==
Hues and Cues is played with a color map game board of 480 hues, and a deck of cards that each have four hues and their corresponding locations on the board. Each round, a player is chosen to be the "cue giver" and they draw a card from the deck, choose one of the colors on the card, and give a one-word cue to describe it. Other players take turns guessing the color in clockwise order, indicating their guess by placing one of their game tokens on a colored square on the game board. Only one player token can occupy a colored square. Once all players have made a guess, the cue giver then gives a zero, one, or two-word clue, and players make a second guess in counterclockwise order using another game token. Cues cannot include basic color names or the words "light" or "dark".

Once all guesses have been made, the cue giver reveals the color by placing a 3x3 scoring frame onto the board so that the chosen color is in the center. Points are awarded to the cue giver based on the number of tokens within the frame. Players receive points for the proximity of each of their tokens to the chosen color. The game ends when each player has acted as the cue giver a set number of times, and the player with the most points is the winner.

== Reception ==
Nicole Lee, writing for The Guardian, described Hues and Cues as the "best game for large groups," noting its simplicity to learn and enjoyable gameplay. In an article for Polygon, Clayton Ashley described Hues and Cues as "an immensely fun party game that’s sure to provoke strange discussion."

John Kaufeld wrote in Game Trade Magazine that the game was "unique" and well-suited for large groups, but noted that he believed it to be inaccessible for those with color blindness or visual impairments due to the game's reliance on color as a game mechanic. Scott Brady clarified in a comment on BoardGameGeek that Hues and Cues was successfully playtested with color deficient players to ensure that the hues were differentiable to people with various vision types.

Hues and Cues was received an Early Gamers Recommendation by the American Tabletop Awards in 2021.
