= Ark Nova =

2021 zoo-building board game by Mathias Wigge

- Box cover
- Other names: Arche Nova
- Designers: Mathias Wigge
- Illustrators: Loïc Billiau; Dennis Lohausen
- Publishers: Feuerland Spiele; Capstone Games
- Publication: 2021 (Feuerland Spiele); 2022 (Capstone Games)
- Genres: Strategy
- Players: 1–4
- Playing time: 90–150 minutes
- Age range: 14+
- Website: www.feuerland-spiele.de/spiele/arche-nova/

Ark Nova (Arche Nova) is a zoo-building, card-driven, engine-building board game for one to four players, designed by Mathias Wigge with illustrations by Loïc Billiau and Dennis Lohausen. It was first published by Feuerland Spiele in 2021 and released in English by Capstone Games in 2022.

Players develop modern zoos by building enclosures, playing animal cards, and supporting conservation projects around the world. Its central mechanism uses five Action cards whose strength shifts over the course of play, creating an action-selection system in which players balance immediate zoo growth, Appeal, and long-term Conservation goals.

Upon release, Ark Nova was widely praised by critics and won major awards including the Deutscher Spiele Preis and the Golden Geek Award for Best Heavy Game of the Year; it was also recommended for the Kennerspiel des Jahres. Later developments included the expansion Ark Nova: Marine Worlds and the digital adaptation Ark Nova Digital.

== Development and publication ==
Wigge developed Ark Nova after years as a hobby gamer and competitive Magic: The Gathering player. He has said that he wanted to create a game specifically suited to his own group's tastes: an optimization-focused Eurogame built around a zoo theme he had liked since childhood. He worked on the design during night shifts for more than a year before showing it to friends, and later said that his background in card games shaped how he thought about balance and variance in the game's large deck of unique cards.

When Feuerland Spiele took on the design, the game was streamlined to reach a broader audience, but the large deck of unique cards remained central to the finished product; Wigge later said that the published version even incorporated cards that might otherwise have been saved for an expansion. Feuerland published the original German-language edition, Arche Nova, in 2021. Capstone Games announced the English-language edition in October 2021 for release in February 2022, and the English rulebook credited Feuerland Spiele and Capstone Games as co-publishers.

The published edition credits Billiau and Lohausen as illustrators. Its visual design combines animal photography on many Animal cards with icon-based Sponsor, Conservation, and Action cards, while each player develops a separate zoo map that fills with enclosures and buildings over the course of play.

== Gameplay ==
In Ark Nova, players build and develop modern zoos while advancing on the Appeal and Conservation tracks. Play proceeds in turns, with periodic Breaks that interrupt play for income and upkeep when the break token reaches the end of its track.

Each player manages five Action cards: Cards, Build, Animals, Association, and Sponsors. The strength of an action depends on the slot the card currently occupies, from 1 on the left to 5 on the right. After a card is used, it returns to the first slot and the other cards shift one space to the right, so unused actions become more powerful over time; X-tokens and upgraded Action cards can further increase what a player can do on a turn.

Players expand their zoos by building enclosures and other structures on their zoo maps, then playing Animal cards that meet the available space and icon requirements. Sponsor cards add special abilities or end-game scoring opportunities, while the Association action is used to gain partner zoos, universities, reputation, and access to conservation projects. Together, these systems create card combinations and engine-building strategies that can emphasize Appeal, Conservation, or a mix of both.

The game ends if, at the end of a turn or during a Break, a player's Appeal and Conservation markers meet or pass one another. If this happens at the end of a turn, the other players each take one final turn; if it happens during a Break, all players take one final turn. After final scoring cards and other end-game effects are resolved, each player determines a target number from the Conservation track, compares it with their Appeal value to calculate victory points, and the player with the highest total wins, with ties broken by the number of Conservation projects supported.

== Later developments ==
Capstone Games later published Ark Nova: Marine Worlds, an expansion for the base game, and Dire Wolf Digital released Ark Nova Digital as a cross-platform adaptation in 2025.

== Critical reception ==
Reviews praised Ark Nova for its strategic depth, its shifting Action-card system, and the way its mechanisms tied zoo development to conservation themes. Critics also highlighted its broad range of card combinations and the tension created by balancing short-term efficiency with long-term scoring opportunities. Keith Law, writing for Polygon, called it "an incredible game in just about every dimension", while The New York Times's Wirecutter described it as "remarkably elegant".

Criticism tended to focus on the game's accessibility, length, and relatively limited direct interaction between players. Law argued that it was less approachable than Wingspan, despite admiring its design, while Wirecutter noted that its scale could be daunting for new players. Other reviewers pointed to a substantial rules overhead, long teaching times, and slower pacing at higher player counts, even while praising the game overall.

Coverage of the game often positioned it alongside other heavyweight strategy titles, especially Terraforming Mars, and treated it as a major entry in that part of the hobby. Later retrospective reviews continued to discuss it as a prominent modern euro-style design rather than a short-lived release.

== Awards and honours ==
Ark Nova won the 2021 Golden Geek Award for Heavy Game of the Year, appeared on the 2022 Kennerspiel des Jahres recommendation list, and won the 2022 Deutscher Spiele Preis.

The Spiel des Jahres jury described the game as thematically accessible despite its difficulty, and said that its more than 200 cards and timing mechanism gave it considerable depth.
