= Donald X. Vaccarino =

American board game designer

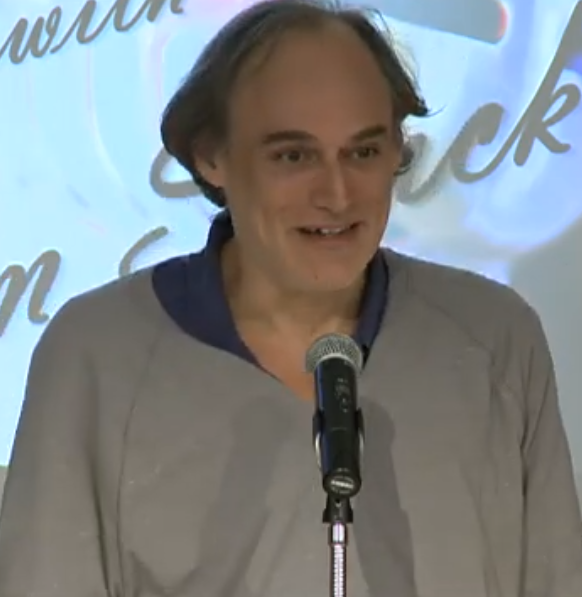
- Reading poetry at the San Francisco Public Library in 2022
- Born: 1969 (age 56–57)

Donald X. Vaccarino (born 1969) is an American game designer. He published the card game Dominion in 2008, which won the Spiel des Jahres award along with many others, and has had 16 expansions. (Note: Two of the expansions, Cornucopia and Guilds, were later combined into one.) A 17th expansion, Dominion: Arcana, was listed as upcoming in 2026. Dominion and its expansions had sold more than 2.5 million copies worldwide, as of 2017. His 2012 game Kingdom Builder also won the Spiel des Jahres award.

With Dominion, Vaccarino is credited with pioneering the genre of deck-building games. Dominion has been studied academically as a test-bed for how evolving game rules can create balanced play.

== Life and work ==
Vaccarino worked as a full-time programmer at age 16, before becoming self-employed as a game designer around 1994. Vaccarino was influenced by Magic: The Gathering and was credited with contributing to the game in the Comprehensive Rules of Magic. Vaccarino's games have been published by companies including Rio Grande Games and Queen Games.

== Selected works ==
Vaccarino's published works include:

- 2008: Dominion
- 2009: Dominion: Intrigue
- 2009: Dominion: Seaside
- 2010: Dominion: Alchemy
- 2010: Dominion: Prosperity
- 2011: Dominion: Cornucopia
- 2011: Dominion: Hinterlands
- 2011: Nefarious
- 2011: Nitroplus Card Masters
- 2012: Dominion: Dark Ages
- 2012: Kingdom Builder
- 2012: Monster Factory
- 2012: Gauntlet of Fools
- 2012: Android: Infiltration
- 2012: Kingdom Builder: Nomads
- 2013: Dominion: Guilds
- 2013: Kingdom Builder: Crossroads
- 2014: Temporum
- 2014: Piña Pirata
- 2014: Greed
- 2015: Dominion: Adventures
- 2016: Dominion: Empires
- 2016: Kingdom Builder: Marshlands
- 2017: Temporum: Alternate Realities
- 2017: Kingdom Builder: Harvest
- 2018: Dominion: Nocturne
- 2019: Dominion: Renaissance
- 2020: Dominion: Menagerie
- 2020: Winter Kingdom
- 2022: Dominion: Allies
- 2022: Dominion: Plunder
- 2024: Dominion: Rising Sun
- 2025: Moon Colony Bloodbath
- 2026 (expected): Dominion: Arcana

== Personal life ==
Vaccarino lives in California with at least two daughters.

== See also ==
- List of game designers
- List of Game of the Year awards (board games)
