= Mombasa (board game) =

2015 euro-style board game

- Designers: Alexander Pfister
- Publishers: eggertspiele Pegasus Games; R&R Games
- Players: 2 to 4
- Playing time: 75–150 minutes
- Chance: Low
- Skills: Resource management, strategy

Mombasa is a 2015 Euro-style board game by Alexander Pfister. The theme is the rivalry of four trading companies in Africa. Players buy shares in the companies and expand them to their advantage, aiming to build the most valuable portfolio. Game mechanics include deck building and worker placement. Mombasa won the 2016 Deutscher Spielepreis.

== Game play ==
The game is played on a board depicting a map of Africa and runs over seven rounds. Each player has a similar hand of cards and two bonus markers. To start a round, players simultaneously select cards to be active this turn. Players then take turns either to use active cards of one type or to place a bonus marker. Turns continue around the table until all pass.

The cards are of several types. Goods cards depict 1 to 4 bananas, coffee or cotton. They are used either to purchase new cards or to advance along a company track to earn shares, cash and other bonuses. Exploration cards, also valued from 1 to 4, add trading posts to the map, increasing a company's share price and giving various rewards to the player. Bookkeeper cards expand a player's library and merchant cards generate diamonds, both of which count towards the final score. Initially, each player has three slots for active cards. Collecting books and diamonds can open two further slots. Share cards appear later in the game; they allow no action but increase the player's score.

Bonus markers are placed on worker placement spaces on the board to claim various benefits. Majority spaces advance the player with the most valuable goods or exploration cards along a company track. Tile spaces give an extra card for the next round. Other spaces allow a player to buy or sell cards for cash, or to claim the right to play first next round.

After each round, players retrieve some of the cards they used in earlier rounds using a unique mechanic. Each active card is moved to one of several resting piles, after picking up just one of the resting piles. After seven rounds, each player values their shares, books, diamonds and cash; the richest player wins.

== Release and awards ==
Mombasa was developed by Austrian game designer Alexander Pfister as Afrika 1830 and won the 2011 Hippodice Spieleclub game designer competition. It was released in 2015 by eggertspiele and distributed by Pegasus Spiele. It was awarded first place in the 2016 Deutscher Spielepreis.
