= Board game awards =

This list of board game awards is an index to articles that describe notable awards given to creators of board games. It also gives articles related to chess and go competitions.

== Game awards ==
Award	Country	Sponsor	Description
Charles S. Roberts Awards	United States	World Boardgaming Championships	Excellence in the historical wargaming hobby
Deutscher Spiele Preis	Germany	Die Pöppel-Revue	"Gamers' games" with particularly good or innovative gameplay
Dragon Awards	United States	Dragon Con	Excellence in various categories of science fiction, fantasy, and horror novels, movies, television, and games
Essen Feather	Germany	Deutscher Spiele Preis	Games with well-written rules
Games 100	United States	Games World of Puzzles	Several categories for which "best" games are determined
International Gamers Award		International Gamers Awards	Strategy board games and historical simulation games
Ion Award	United States	SaltCON board game convention	Excellence in game design
Origins Awards	United States	Origins Game Fair	Outstanding work in the game industry
Schweizer Spielepreis	Switzerland	Schweizer Spielmesse	Family games, children's games and strategy games
Spiel des Jahres	Germany		Top-quality games in the German market
Zenobia Award	United States		Historical games by designers from underrepresented groups, with a financial reward and mentorship by industry leaders for the winner

== Players ==
=== Chess ===
- Grandmaster (chess) Awarded by Switzerland-based FIDE. The highest title a chess player can attain
- Geography of chess – National federations and championships recognized by FIDE
- World Chess Championship
- World Junior Chess Championship

=== Go ===
- List of professional Go tournaments
- List of top title holders in Go

== See also ==
- Lists of awards
- List of game awards
- List of Game of the Year awards (board games)
