= Rave (board game) =

1991 board game

Rave is a board game that was created by WOW Enterprises in 1991. The game is based on the subcultural dance movement of the early 1990s.

The game was created by Patrick Treloar (MD of Wow Enterprises) and designed by The Style Bandits (amongst others). It contains a section designed by Jamie Hewlett of Gorillaz and Tank Girl fame and the Weird Studio Bunch from Worthing. It went on to sell over 20,000 copies until it was withdrawn from the shelves by WH Smith when the store was made aware of its overtly adult content. Treloar has described Rave as "the world's 'first acid house board-game'".

The idea of the game was to drive around looking for fliers and energi [sic] tablets. Once the player had accumulated enough energi tablets, they could then proceed to their rave and dance, until they collected all three sections of the WOW Triptych.

WOW Enterprises are now engaged in the design and creation of an MMORPG based around the game.

== See also ==
- Rave
- Church of the Subgenius
- Dance Music
