= List of game awards =

This list of game awards is an index to articles about notable awards given for games. Separate lists cover video game awards, board game awards, Game of the Year awards for video games and Game of the Year awards for board games

== List ==
Award	Country	Sponsor	Description
As d'Or	France	Festival International des Jeux	Various categories
Charles Roberts Awards Hall of Fame	United States	Charles S. Roberts Award Committee	Military strategy games and simulations
Charles S. Roberts Award	United States	Charles S. Roberts Award Committee	Excellence in the historical wargaming hobby
Diana Jones Award	United States	Diana Jones committee	Can be awarded to a person, product, publication, company, organization, event or trend – anything related to gaming
Dragon Awards	United States	Dragon Con	Science fiction or fantasy games in various media. See also List of Dragon Award nominees.
ENnie Awards	United States	Gen Con	Fan-based awards for role-playing game products and publishers
Game Chef	United States	Game Chef	Role-playing game designers
Golden Geek Award	United States	BoardGameGeek	Board gaming
Gotland Game Conference	Sweden	Campus Gotland	Best student game / computer animation
Indie RPG Awards	United States	Andy Kitkowski, John Kim	Creator-based awards for Indie role-playing games and supplements
International Gamers Award	Germany	International Gamers Awards	Strategy board games and historical simulation games
Jeu de l'année	France	Association de Promotion et d'Evaluation des Jeux	Outstanding parlour games
Magic: The Gathering Hall of Fame	United States	Magic: The Gathering Pro Tour	Most successful Magic: The Gathering Pro Tour players
Oppenheim Toy Portfolio Award	United States	Joanne Oppenheim, Stephanie Oppenheim	Review of children's media by child development experts
Origins Award	United States	Academy of Adventure Gaming Arts and Design, Origins Game Fair	Outstanding work in the game industry
Parents' Choice Award	United States	Parents' Choice Foundation	Best products for children of different ages and backgrounds, and of varied skill and interest levels.
Spiel des Jahres	Germany	Spiel des Jahres	Excellence in game design, promoting top-quality games in the German market
Swedish Game Awards	Sweden	KTH Royal Institute of Technology	Video game development competition

== See also ==
- Lists of awards
- Board game awards
- List of Game of the Year awards (board games)
- List of Game of the Year awards
- List of video game awards
