= The Crew (card game) =

2019 cooperative Science Fiction card game by Thomas Sing

- Designers: Thomas Sing
- Illustrators: Marco Armbruster
- Publishers: Kosmos
- Publication: 2019
- Genres: co-operative, trick-taking
- Players: 3–5
- Playing time: 20 minutes
- Website: thamesandkosmos.com

The Crew: The Quest for Planet Nine is a trick-taking cooperative card game for 2–5 players designed by Thomas Sing and released in 2019. The Crew is played across 50 'missions' where players aim to win tricks based on their task cards, but can only communicate limited information while doing so. Upon its release, The Crew received critical success and won numerous awards. Two major sequels have been realeased: The Crew: Mission Deep Sea, released in 2021, and The Crew: Journey to the Ends of the Earth, released in 2026. In 2024, The Crew: Family Adventure was released, providing a simpler, family-friendly version of the game.

== Gameplay ==
The Crew is a co-operative, trick-taking, limited communication game with four card suits, numbered one to nine, and a separate trump suit, numbered one to four. During each round, the player with the highest trump is designated as the commander, and opens a trick. Other players must play another card matching the trick, if possible. At the end of the round, the player with the highest valued card matching the trick of the starting card wins, unless a trump was played, in which case the highest trump wins. In most rounds (or "missions"), players are assigned a number of task cards - the commander picks the first task (if there is more than one) and players consecutively choose a remaining task. The task cards correspond to the four normal suits, so one player might be tasked with winning the card "pink 4", another with winning "green 9". If a trick contains a player card matching the task card of one player, he/she must win the corresponding player card. The round ends as a victory for all players when all task cards are won; however, if a matching player card is won by another player, all players immediately lose the round, and it must be replayed.

In The Crew, players may not communicate with each other throughout the game about their cards, except by revealing one of their cards along with a communicator token, which may be placed at the top, middle or bottom depending on whether the card is the highest, only or lowest card of the suit.

The game contains a logbook with 50 missions progressively increasing in difficulty. Some missions alter communication rules, require task cards to be finished in a particular order, or introduce other special conditions to win instead of task cards. The game is only "won" when all 50 missions have been completed.

== Reception ==
The Crew received positive reviews upon its release. Space.com listed it as one of the best space-themed board games, and stated that it had "a truly unique plot and challenges". Rachel Kaufman from the Smithsonian Magazine also praised the game's co-operative, "family friendly" mechanics, and considered it to be suitable for "fans of traditional trick-taking card games who want something new", but criticised the theme. The replayabilility offered by the missions, which become increasingly difficult, was positively commented by multiple reviewers, including Nicole Brady, a member of the American Tabletop Awards, and Matt Basil. Matt Jarvis from the Dicebreaker also listed the game as one of the best co-operative games, praising the "difficulty escalation" for the missions, and replayability, and compared the limited communication mechanic to The Mind, but stated that it "expands upon it to provide a greater challenge". The game also received several accolades, including the 2020 Kennerspiel des Jahres award, with the jury stating that in the game players "gradually come to appreciate the subtleties of the genre and are challenged in an original way", the Deutscher Spiele Preis award, and the American Tabletop Award for Best Casual Game.

Reviewing for TechRaptor, Andrew Stretch recommended the game for players who enjoy the trick-taking mechanism, but critiqued its appeal for those who want to have "an entertaining experience", and considered the gameplay as restrictive. He concluded that "it will be few and far between sessions when you have anything more exciting to play".

== Reimplementation ==
In 2021, The Crew: Mission Deep Sea was released as a sequel to the original game, replacing the original task cards with 96 different task cards with difficulty ratings, along with 32 new missions. Reviewing for the Paste Magazine, Keith Law criticised the theme, but enjoyed that the game allowed to "craft your own challenges using the difficulty rating system", concluding that it was somewhat better than the original. The Smithsonian Magazine also considered it to be superior compared to the original. Polygon listed the sequel as one of the best board games, and commended the new task cards as well as innovation. The game was also recommended for the 2021 Best Casual Game for the American Tabletop Awards.

In 2024, The Crew: Family Adventure was released as a family version of the original game, simplifying the missions and targeting at a younger audience.

In 2026, The Crew: Journey to the Ends of the Earth was released as the third major installment to the series. The game includes 104 task cards, and the gameplay follows a "quest" format in which you progress through 25 different stages, moving spaces in a logbook depending on the difficulty of the completed task.
