= Lost Ruins of Arnak =

2020 board game

- Box cover
- Designers: Mín & Elwen
- Illustrators: Ondřej Hrdina, Milan Vavroň, Jiří Kůs, František Sedláček
- Publishers: Czech Games Edition
- Publication: 2020
- Players: 1 to 4
- Playing time: 30 to 120 minutes
- Age range: 12 and up
- Website: czechgames.com

Lost Ruins of Arnak is a 2020 board game by the husband-wife duo Michal "Elwen" Štach and Michaela "Mín" Štachova. It won Game of the Year in the 2020 Board Game Quest Awards as well as the 2021 Deutscher Spiele Preis.

== Gameplay ==
Lost Ruins of Arnak uses a combination of deck-building and worker placement mechanics for its core gameplay. The game is played over 5 rounds. During each round players take turns choosing various actions. On their turn, players can manage their cards, send their archeologists to discover new sites, dig at already explored ones, overcome guardians, or research.

Discovering new sites extends the set of possible dig sites, but it also awakens a guardian, which can result in penalty during scoring. Digging rewards players with treasures and resources that can be used for further progress. Research provides players with different bonuses and increasingly more victory points as they advance on the research track. Each player starts with the same set of cards, which can be upgraded over the course of the game. Most cards can be played just for their effects, while some actions require players to use cards in addition. After the final round players add up their points coming from different sources. The player with the most points wins the game.

A solo variant is also featured, utilizing a set of cards as an artificial opponent, which lets players experience the game alone.
