= Klaus Teuber =

German board game designer (1952–2023)

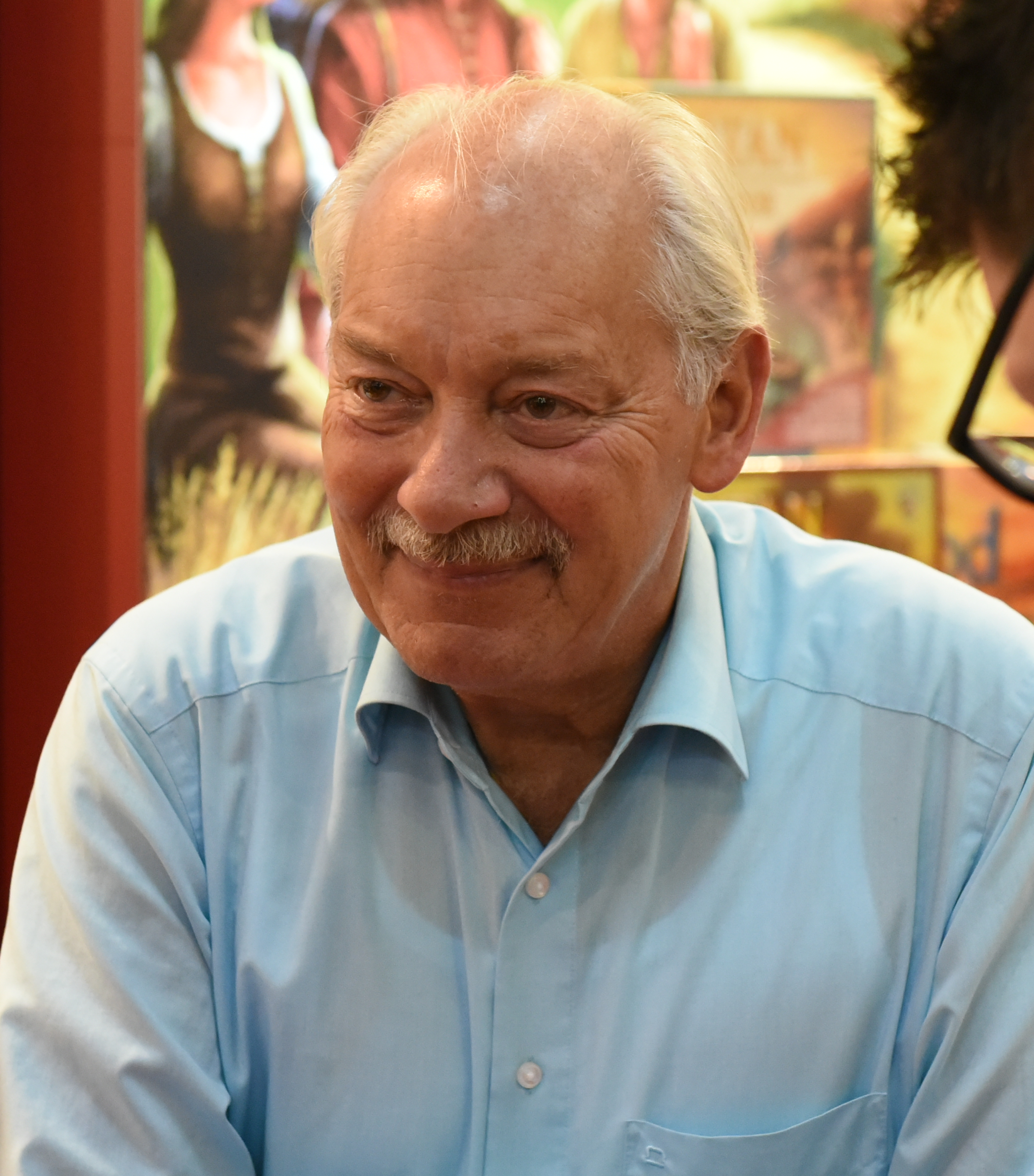
- Teuber in 2017
- Born: Klaus Wilhelm Heinrich Teuber; 25 June 1952; Rai-Breitenbach, Breuberg, West Germany
- Died: 1 April 2023 (aged 70)
- Occupations: Dental technician; game designer
- Known for: Board game developer
- Works: Barbarossa (1988); Adel Verpflichtet (1990); Drunter und Drüber (1991); The Settlers of Catan (1995)

Klaus Wilhelm Heinrich Teuber (25 June 1952 – 1 April 2023) was a German board game designer best known as the creator of Catan. Originally working as a dental technician, he began designing games first as a hobby then as a full-time career.

Four of his games won the prestigious Spiel des Jahres (Game of the Year) award: Barbarossa (1988), Adel Verpflichtet (1990), Drunter und Drüber (1991) and The Settlers of Catan (1995). The latter sold over 40 million copies, was translated into 40 languages and spawned a family of expansions and versions. Teuber founded the games company Catan GmbH in 2002, and his sons now direct the family business.

Teuber was inducted into the Origin Awards Hall of Fame by the AAGAD (Academy of Adventure Gaming Arts & Design) in 2004. In 2010, he received a special As d'Or in recognition of his lifetime achievement at the Festival International des Jeux in France.

== Early life ==
Teuber was born in 1952 in the village of Rai-Breitenbach, West Germany, under the Breuberg castle. As a child, he played games with model soldiers. He later wrote that his favourite subject in school was geography – he enjoyed making maps – followed by history and chemistry. Teuber returned to gaming as a young husband and father during his military service.

At the age of 11, Teuber was given the board game Romans vs. Carthaginians. Teuber graduated from high school and did military service, then studied chemistry, then completed his intermediate diploma (receiving a degree in chemistry), then joined his father's 65-employee dental laboratory business which fell into large problems, and his father fell ill.

== Barbarossa ==
"When I had trouble in my former profession and needed a mental vacation, I read a book about witches and decided to make a game that follows the story first. Each development of game, I wanted to experience the world of the novel."

Teuber worked as a dental technician for the business Teuber Dental-Labor near Darmstadt, but he was not happy in this work. In the 1980s, he designed his first game, Barbarossa, inspired by the fantasy trilogy, The Riddle-Master, by Patricia A. McKillip. In the game, players make sculptures out of modelling clay, and try to guess what the objects represent. After working on the game for seven years, Teuber finally showed Barbarossa to a publisher.

== The Settlers of Catan ==
In 1991, Teuber started designing The Settlers of Catan, inspired by the history of Viking settlers in Iceland. He took four years to develop the island-settling game; his major breakthrough was when he introduced hexagonal tiles instead of using squares to represent wood, ore, brick, wool, and wheat. Catan has been credited with launching a new more "social" era for board games, introducing bargaining and bartering among players as part of the strategy to win.

In 1999, he sold the dental laboratory, which he had taken over from his father.

The commercial success of Catan allowed Teuber to become a full-time game designer in 1998. The family game business was incorporated as Catan GmbH in 2002 and his sons Benjamin and Guido are directors while his wife Claudia and his daughter also have roles as bookkeeper and tester.

The popularity of Catan continued to grow, eventually translated into 40 languages, with multiple expansions, geographically themed versions, a card game, a version for young children, a video game, and online versions, as well as a novel and other spinoffs. For the development of the video game adaptation of Catan, Teuber created a Microsoft Excel spreadsheet with "elaborate logic chains and probability matrices" so that the developers could determine the effects of each action on gameplay.

In 2020, sales of Catan surged during the first five months of the global COVID-19 pandemic, as board games became popular during the worldwide lockdown. As of 2023, more than 40 million copies of Catan have been sold worldwide.

Despite the success of Catan, Teuber was described as remaining down-to-earth. In 2023, Dan Zak wrote in The Washington Post, "Among hobbyists and gamers he was revered like a rock star, but he looked and acted and sounded like a man who tinkered with stuff in his basement...He was, at heart, a hobbyist." When Teuber was asked why he thought Catan was so popular, he said it may have been due to a "good balance between strategy and luck".

== Death ==
Teuber died on 1 April 2023 at age 70, after a brief illness.

== Games (selection) ==
For a more complete list, see catan.com's ludography 1988–2024

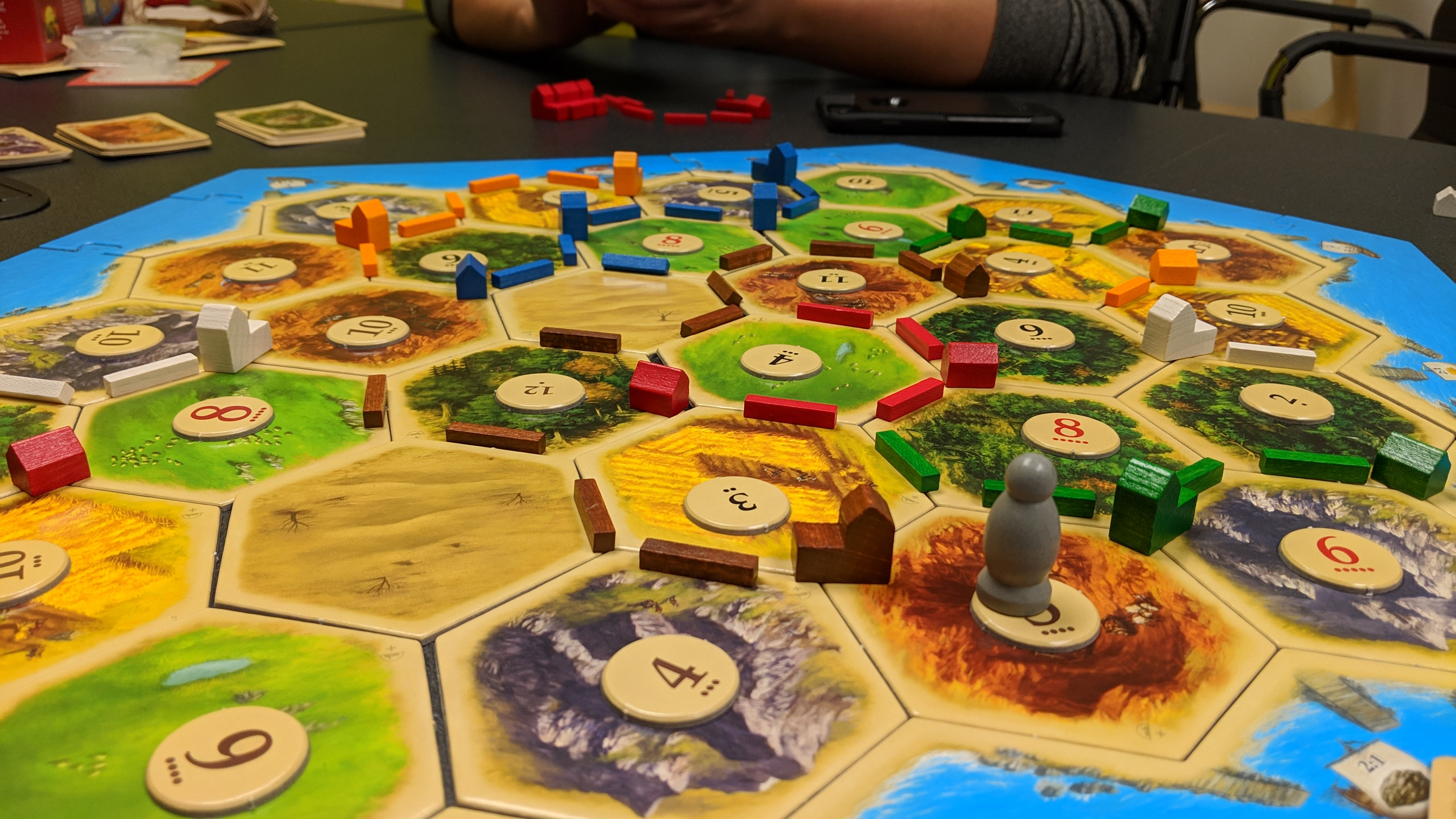
Catan game board

- Barbarossa (1988)
- Timberland (1989), a German-style board game based on woodland management that came in ninth in the Deutscher Spiele Preis (German Game Prize).
- Adel Verpflichtet (1990) (Fair Means or Foul, Hoity Toity, Hook or Crook). It was published in the American market by Avalon Hill in 1991, making it an early German-style board game import.
- Drunter und Drüber (1991) (reworked as Wacky Wacky West in 2010).
- Catan (1995) (Die Siedler von Catan, The Settlers of Catan) and its many expansions and versions such as the 2007 video game.
- Entdecker (1996).
- Löwenherz or Domaine (1997)
- Pop Belly (1999)

== Game of the Year ==
Teuber won the award Spiel des Jahres (Game of the Year) a total of four times: for Barbarossa in 1988, Adel Verpflichtet (Hoity Toity) in 1990, Drunter und Drüber (Wacky Wacky West) in 1991, and Die Siedler von Catan (The Settlers of Catan) in 1995.

== See also ==
- Going Cardboard, (documentary; includes an interview with Teuber)
