= Reich Star =

Tabletop science fiction role-playing game

- Cover art by Ken Richardson
- Designers: Simon Bell, Ken Richardson
- Publishers: Creative Encounters
- Publication: 1990
- Genres: Alternate history
- Systems: Custom

Reich Star is a science fiction/alternate history role-playing game published by Creative Encounters in 1990.

== Description ==
Reich Star is an alternate history role-playing game set in 2134, almost two hundred years after World War II was won by the Axis powers. Nazi Germany and Imperial Japan subsequently ruled the world before moving out into space in the 22nd century, where they have enslaved technologically inferior alien races.

Players create characters who are part of a resistance movement, seeking to overthrow the Nazi regime. Characters can be mercenaries, smugglers, explorers and other character classes. Characters receive a limited pool of Luck Points that can be spent to temporarily increase an attribute such as Strength when needed.

The book also covers history, notable persons, and technology.

== Publication history ==
Reich Star was designed by Ken Richardson and developed by Simon Bell.

== Reception ==
In his 1990 book The Complete Guide to Role-Playing Games, game critic Rick Swan did not think the game mechanics were especially innovative, "but they're clearly explained and quite thorough." Swan liked the concept of the game and concluded by giving it a solid rating of 3 out of 4, saying, ""Designers Ken Richardson and Simon Bell have a lot of fun with the premise, producing a solid science fiction RPG in the process. Reich Star is just about as realistic as a Roger Corman movie, but in the hands of an experienced referee, it can be just as exciting."

Stewart Wieck reviewed Reich Star in White Wolf #24 (Dec./Jan., 1990), rating it a 3 out of 5 and stated that "Reich Star, though hindered by a mediocre game system, definitely deserves attention because of its classy treatment of a delicate and interesting subject matter."

In an article about alternate history games in Issue 105 of Polyhedron, Roger E. Moore pointed out that alternate history games involving changes to already fictional settings, such as a new Star Trek timeline, were less compelling than an alternate history where the timeline diverged from real events. Moore held up Reich Star as an example of this, writing of the Nazi-dominated future, "This possibility is quite intriguing, but it was founded on a change in real events, not a fictional future divergence in history, and is thus innately more interesting than the latter."
