= Drunter und Drüber =

Board game

- Box cover
- Designers: Klaus Teuber
- Illustrators: Franz Vohwinkel
- Publishers: Hans im Glück
- Players: 2 to 4
- Playing time: 30 to 45 minutes
- Age range: 9 years and up

Drunter und Drüber (German: [ˈdʁʊntɐ ʊn ˈdʁyːbɐ], lit. "under and over", fig. "haywire") is a multiplayer board game invented by Klaus Teuber, first published in 1991 in Germany by Hans im Glück. A second edition was released in 1994 by Hans im Glück and featured art by Franz Vohwinkel. The game was repackaged and rethemed as the western game Wacky Wacky West in 2010.

== Gameplay ==
Players take on the role of the people of Schilda and work to build a new town after they burned down their old one. Buildings are already completed and each player is secretly assigned one of six types of buildings, that each appear five times on the board. Buildings closer to the center of the board have a higher point value. Each player is given an identical set of vote cards that are worth varying degrees of yes or no. Every turn, players lay down tiles of streets, rivers, and town walls which add on to existing pieces. Buildings can be covered by tiles, but when someone attempts to build over an outhouse everyone votes on whether to allow it or not. If there are more negative votes, the tile does not get played. Each player tries to keep his or her buildings uncovered. The game ends when all the pieces have been placed or all players pass consecutively; then everyone tallies their score from their remaining buildings on the map and the player with the highest score wins.

== Awards ==
- Spiel des Jahres Game of the Year 1991
- Deutscher Spiele Preis 1991 3rd place

== Reviews ==
- Review by Doug Adams
- Review by Debbie Pickett
- Review from Sumo, Issue 5, June 1991
