= Barbarossa (board game) =

1988 clay-shaping board game

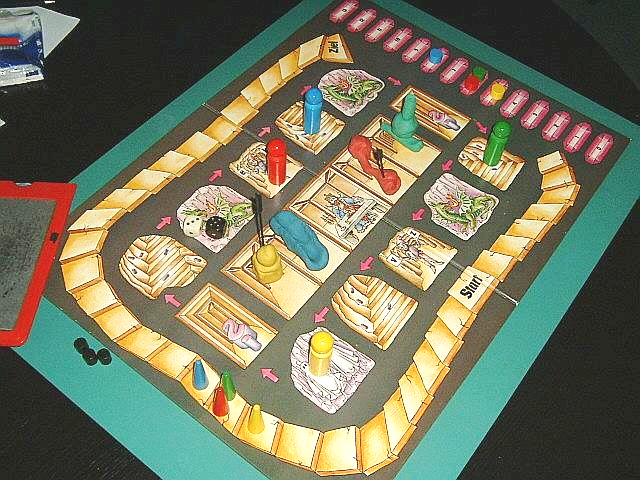
- Designers: Klaus Teuber
- Publishers: Kosmos; Rio Grande Games
- Players: 3–6
- Setup time: 5 minutes
- Playing time: 60 minutes
- Chance: Medium
- Age range: 16 +
- Skills: Sculpture, Logic

Barbarossa is a clay-shaping German-style board game for 3 to 6 players, designed by Klaus Teuber who based it off The Riddle-Master trilogy by Patricia A. McKillip, it was published in 1988 by Kosmos in German and by Rio Grande Games in English. Barbarossa won the 1988 Spiel des Jahres award.

== Gameplay ==
The game is played on a circular board, with three tracks running around it. Around the outside are the scoring track and the elfstone (money) track. Further in there is a circular track with twelve marked spaces on it, and in the center there is a space for sculptures. Later editions of the game change the shape of the board but not its contents.

At the start of the game, each player chooses two objects from a list provided and creates clay sculptures of each, and places them in the middle of the board. Each player places on the board three tokens: a magician, a witches' hat and an Elfstone. The hats are placed on the scoring track; the elfstones are placed on the elfstone track, and the magicians are placed on the space marked "A". Each player receives three curse tokens.

Players then take turns as follows: They may begin either by rolling a six-sided die and moving their magician that many spaces, or by forfeiting their roll and instead spending elfstones to move. After they roll or spend elfstones, what happens next depends on the space they land on:

Elfstone (4)
The player gains one elfstone - this is recorded by moving their elfstone token one space forward along the elfstone track. Players may not gain more than 13 elfstones.
Dragon (3)
Each other player gains one point - this is recorded by moving their hat token one space forward along the scoring track
Ghost (1)
Each other player gains two points.
Dwarf (2)
The player may ask an opponent for a letter from the name of their object. The player can specify which letter - e.g. "first", "second" or "last". The opponent writes down the letter and passes it to the player. If the player asks for a letter which is not in the name of the object, they are given an empty sheet of paper.
Question mark (2)
The player may ask two sets of questions about the opponents' objects. The player asks (out loud) one opponent a yes–no question. The opponent must (truthfully) answer "Yes", "No", "Possibly", or "I Don't Know". The player may continue to ask questions until the answer is "No". The player then asks a second set of questions, again until they get the answer "No". The two sets of questions do not have to be about the same object, or to the same opponent. The player then has an opportunity to guess any object, by writing down their guess and passing it to the opponent. If the guess is wrong, the opponent says "No". If it is correct, they say "Yes" and the player sticks a flag into the object's sculpture.
The first player to correctly guess an object gets 5 points, and the second gets 3. The opponent whose object is guessed either gains or loses points, depending on how many players are playing and how many objects have already been correctly guessed.

At any point, a player may spend a curse token to either ask a player for a letter (as if they had landed on a dwarf) or to guess an object (as if they had landed on a question mark, but without the questions). Once a player has spent their first three curse tokens, and five curse tokens have been spent, they may take three more tokens - so any given player may spend six tokens during the course of the game.

When a player reaches the end of the scoring track, or when 13 (3-4 players) or 17 (5-6 players) flags have been placed, the game ends. Each player loses two points for each of their objects which only got one flag, and five points for each of their objects which did not get any flags. The player with the highest score wins.

== Reception ==
The game won the 1988 Spiel des Jahres award. The jury was critical of the components, but praised the engagement and puzzle mechanisms, stating that "[of] course, ancient guessing game traditions hover over the game idea. But Klaus Teuber gives it all a completely new, unique appeal with the guessing tasks to be modeled out of modeling clay and with the thoroughly successful linking to a board game".

== Reviews ==
- Casus Belli #39 (Aug 1987)
