= Great Western Trail (board game) =

Wild West-themed board game

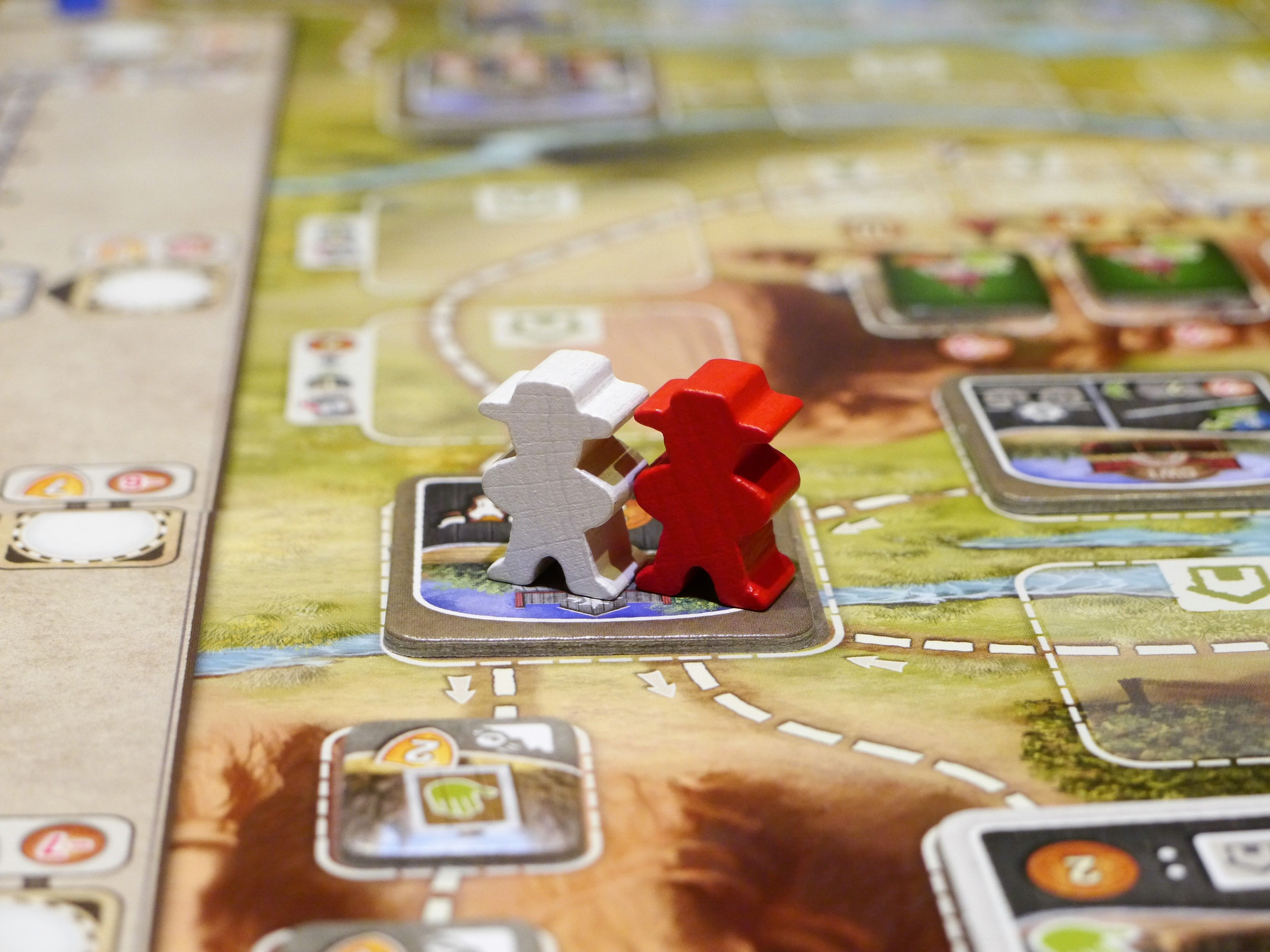
- Designers: Alexander Pfister
- Illustrators: Andreas Resch, Chris Quilliams (second edition)
- Publication: 2017; 9 years ago
- Players: 2–4 (1–4, second edition)
- Playing time: 75–150 minutes
- Age range: 12+

Great Western Trail is a board game designed by Alexander Pfister for two to four players, which was published in 2017 by Eggertspiele. It is a complex and strategic Eurogame loosely themed on the American frontier and the original Great Western Cattle Trail, in which players engage in the transportation and delivery of cattle. A second edition, for one to four players, was published in 2021.

The game is also known in other languages as 그레이트 웨스턴 트레일 (Korean), Great Western Trail: La Gran Ruta del Oeste (Spanish), A nagy western utazás (Hungarian), グレート ウエスタン トレイル (Japanese), Great Western Trail: Aventură prin Vestul Sălbatic (Romanian), Великий западный путь (Russian).

== Gameplay ==
The gameplay combines "hand management, action selection, and strategic movement", with the object being to accumulate victory points, which can be achieved by various means. It takes about 75 to 150 minutes to play. In addition to the gameboard, each player has a dedicated side board on which are displayed the turn details (top), auxiliary actions (left), the player's certificates (right), and workers (centre). Each player draws a hand of cattle cards and places their herder and train meeples at the starting locations.

Each turn, a player executes the steps as depicted in the turn details area. First, their herder is moved a number of spaces along the game board, up to the maximum indicated. The space on which it lands indicates further actions the player may take, such as erecting buildings on the trail, buying or selling cattle, engaging in trade, or hiring staff. If the player passes over hazards, teepees, or certain buildings owned by opposing players, they must pay a fee in coins. At the end of each turn, the player draws a number of cards from their personal stack to regain their hand limit.

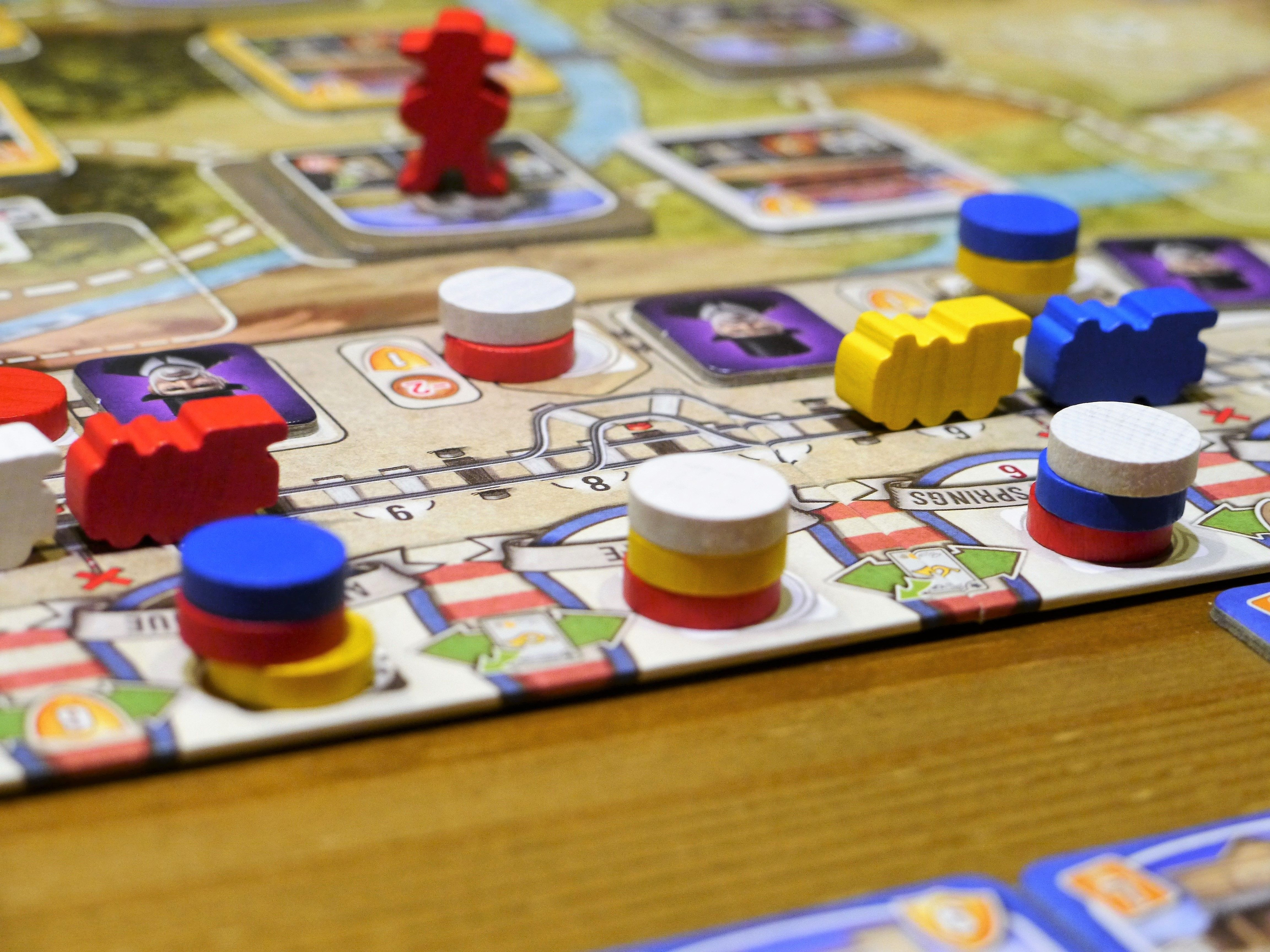
The delivery track

The game progresses as the players advance along the trail toward Kansas City. Upon reaching this destination, five actions are executed: the trading areas are re-stocked, two worker supply areas are filled, the cattle are delivered, and finally, the cattle are loaded onto trains for shipment "further into the wild west". Delivery of cattle is accomplished by a player submitting cattle cards in their hands; they receive coins to the value of the sum of the points on the unique cattle cards they have delivered, plus any certificates on their player board that they choose to spend. Shipment of cattle can be made to any city along the track having a value no higher than the value obtained in the delivery phase. The player takes a piece from their board and places it on the selected space. Removal of this piece from the player board enables them to use one of a new action, a larger certificate capacity, greater movement, or larger hand size.

Placing pieces in adjacent cities may earn the player various rewards or penalties including victory points. Cattle cards earn a player a range of victory points, the value printed on each card.

Analysis of the gameplay identifies three broad strategies, depending on the player's principal focus for scoring victory points: collecting and delivering cattle, adding buildings to the board, or advancing their train and upgrading stations. However successful play generally requires some attention to be given to all three areas, and hybrid strategies combining two of these approaches can also be successful.

== Expansions ==
A number of expansions have been released:

- Promo Station Master Tiles (2017): Two new stationmaster tiles given away with issue #95 of the French board game magazine Plato Magazine.
- The Eleventh Building Tile (2017): A new building tile that was given away as part of the Deutscher Spiele Preis 2017 goodie box.
- At the Poker Table (2018): A poker-themed expansion.
- Rails to the North (2018): Adds an expanded rail system.
- 13th Building Tile (2019): Adds a new double-sided building tile.

== Second edition ==
A second edition of the game was published in 2021. It featured new artwork and includes updated game boards made of two layers to prevent components from slipping. Tile and card backgrounds were updated for better contrast to make it "easier to distinguish their icons", and some board colours were made brighter. Rules for a solitaire mode were added based on those created by a fan of the first edition of the game.

The second edition also eliminated "the notion of Native Americans as the invisible enemy" by removing teepees as hazards, replacing them with bandits, and adding ethnic and gender diversity to the workers that can be hired.

Further themed editions, based on the same game mechanics but with different artwork and game boards, are planned for 2022 ('Argentina') and 2023 ('New Zealand').

== Reception ==
In a review for Meeple Mountain, Andrew Plassard stated that Great Western Trail is a "well-designed game with multiple paths to victory" and lots of variation. He said that one drawback is the "difficulty of developing a strategy" given the numerous options available to the player. Tom Mendelsohn, in his review of the game for Ars Technica, states that it is "an absolute delight" to play once the players have learned the extensive rules.

Tahsin Shamma, in a review for Board Game Quest, states that Great Western Trail is an amazing, complex game and that a first-time play "is best with 2 players, but later games are more exciting with 3–4 players". Shamma also stated that the game's components are utilitarian, but the art and iconography is impressive. He scored the game five out of five, highlighting its strengths as the tactical choices available to players, with play style varying each time according to the initial setup, and its drawbacks being its long playing time at first encounter, and a repetitive style when using only the basic setup. In early 2019, the game was also added to the Board Game Quest "Shelf of Greatness". Writing for Tabletop Gaming, Matt Jarvis said that the game "is a masterful amalgamation of deckbuilding, hand management, tile laying, building management, economic strategy and more", which "all comes together to offer an experience that is absolutely top-notch. Complex decisions are made easy to manage thanks to the flawless design and the brilliant theme shines through the gameplay".

In a review of the second edition of the game for Polygon, Keith Law states that it is his favourite complex game which "incorporates multiple ideas ... into one coherent package". He stated that the second edition has new artwork with "functional as well as aesthetic" changes from the first edition and that it also includes a solitaire version adapted from a version developed by "an avid fan of the original" version.

== Awards ==
The Game has been nominated for numerous awards, and was the 'Meeples' Choice' winner in 2016, Gouden Ludo 'Best Expert Game' and Jogo do Ano winner in 2017, and the UK Games Expo 'best board game (European style)' of 2018.
