= Starship Command (card game) =

Starship Command is a 1991 card game published by Inferno Games.

A sequel, Starship Command II, was later released. Both were subsequently reprinted, with new art, as Starship Commander 3rd Edition.

== Gameplay ==
Starship Command is a game in which players begin with five starships in their fleets and battle the other players.

== Reception ==
Ken Carpenter reviewed Starship Command in White Wolf Inphobia #51 (Jan., 1995), rating it a 4.5 out of 5 and stated that "This is one of the best products to hit the game scene in a while. It has the advantage of being portable, highly fun and totally self-contained. I said it before, and I'll say it again: NO BOOSTERS!"

== Reviews ==
- Dragon #204
