= Sea Salt & Paper =

Card game

- Publishers: Studio Bombyx
- Publication: 2022
- Genres: Card Game players=2-3
- Playing time: 30-45 minutes
- Age range: 8+

Sea Salt & Paper is a card game for 2 to 4 players. Designed by Bruno Cathala and Théo Rivière, the game uses a mixture of maritime and origami inspiration as its theme. The game was published in 2022 by Studio Bombyx. It is a simple hand management game where players assemble a hand and place cards for additional effects. The game is best suited to those aged 8 and over and a typical game runs around 30 minutes. The game is cited to be quick to learn and highly replayable.

== Gameplay ==
In Sea Salt & Paper, players collect cards and can score points by playing unique matching pairs, collecting sets of cards, or by playing multiplier cards that boost the values of a player's cards. The game ends when a player reaches either 30,35,or 40 points depending on the number of players (4/3/2 players).

== Reception ==
The game has received slightly mixed reception, with The Guardian describing it as one of the best new board games with "gorgeous origami sea life" artwork featured on the cards. User reviews, however, only rate the game a 7.1 out of 10 on the Board Game Geek forum.

It won Game of the Year in Casual Games for 2024 from The American Tabletop Awards.
