= David G. Watts =

Designer of Board games

David G. Watts is a Welsh games designer and publisher. Originally a school geography teacher at Milford Haven Grammar School, he designed Railway Rivals, his most popular game, to teach the geography of Wales and upon retirement published it under the imprint Rostherne Games. His games have been published worldwide with his greatest successes in Germany. Most use transportation as a theme but he has also designed abstract games, chess variants and a variety of race games.

== Games designed ==
Most games were initially issued as do-it-yourself kits. Several games were later published more professionally by Watts' company Rostherne Games, or by other commercial game companies.

- Railway Rivals (Rostherne Games, Games Workshop, Schmidt Spiele, Laurin, and Queen Spiele) (1973)
- The Peninsular War 1808-14 (1973)
- Marching to Richmond (1974)
- Trans-Clyde Game (1980)
- Pirate Island (Rostherne Games, and Schmidt Spiele) (1984)
- Bus Boss (1985)
- Slick! (1988)
- Stockbridge (1988)
- Send! (1990)
- Overdrafts (1990)
- Chessington (1990)
- Winchester (1990)
- Manchester (1991)
- Thataway (1992)
- Mine! (1993)
- English Civil War (1995)
- Scramble for Africa (1996)
