= Railway Rivals =

Board game

- The Games Workshop UK edition, 1985
- Designers: David G. Watts
- Publishers: Various publishers
- Players: 2–6
- Setup time: 10 minutes
- Playing time: 90 minutes
- Chance: Medium
- Age range: 10+
- Skills: Strategic thought

Railway Rivals is a railroad-themed board game that was originally published by Rostherne Games in 1973. A German language edition was released by Bütehorn in 1979, and a mass-market edition in the UK by Games Workshop in 1985. The game involves railway building and operations.

Rulebook of the 1979 UK edition published by Fairmount Simulation Gaming

== Description ==
Railway Rivals is a boardgame for 2–6 players, in which each is a railway owner, and is striving to build track in order to join up cities and deliver profitable loads.

== Gameplay ==
The game is in two stages; in the first part players draw tracks on the card using washable finetip pens (allowing the board to be cleaned for reuse). Players have a building allowance each turn; building through difficult terrain costs more moves. Players earn money for connecting cities to their railway network, and pay other players for connecting to or building alongside their track.

Once all cities are joined by railway tracks, the second part of the game starts. Players race their trains along the tracks between randomly chosen pairs of cities; just as in real life, players must pay other players to use elements of their track if they don't have a complete route of their own. The choice of routes raced is random; each city is used one or more times. Money is awarded to the trains that arrive first and second, and the player with the most money when all routes have been raced is the winner.

== Maps ==
Initially, the towns on the maps were indexed by the 36 numbers 11–66, allowing a town to be randomly generated by rolling two standard dice. Some towns could have more than one index number associated with them; for example, on maps that included London, it was usual for London to have 4 or even 6 index numbers to reflect its size. As Watts' experience increased, map design got more complex. It became standard for a map to have six "special runs" to destinations at the edges of the map, or special classes of town (for example, sea ports). In redesigns of some early maps, valleys were widened, to make it easier for more than one player to have a route along them. The building cost of going into or out of a hill was also reduced, again increasing competition for previously secure groups of towns.

The first digit of a town's number was considered its "sector" and in postal games GMs would ensure that in the racing phase each sector would see one race to each other sector and one to a special run, to ensure a uniform distribution of the races. In the game's late-1980s and early-1990s heyday, Watts appeared to target a more "gamer" than "family" audience, producing maps on larger hex sheets and with 52 towns indexed by cards rather than the 42 given by the towns + special runs. This led to games taking longer to complete; this appears to have been unpopular with the market, as from 1992 on new map designs in general went back to having 36 towns + special runs and using smaller hex sheets. At this point Watts began to make more use of "small towns", towns which shared their index number with one other town and only scored 3 points rather than 6 for the first player to connect to them; this seems to have been a compromise to allow him to encourage the development of historically occurring tracks without lengthening the game.

The original maps are now out of print. Nevertheless, hundreds of after-market maps have been developed for Railway Rivals (including one for Middle-earth), and they can be developed straightforwardly by enthusiasts. The results of games of Railway Rivals can be compared with the way that real railways developed in a particular area.

German edition Dampfross published by Schmidt Spiele in 1983

== Publication history ==
David Watts, a geography teacher, originally developed the game as a teaching aid to help students become familiar with the geography of industrialized countries and to demonstrate how geography and competition had resulted in railways being developed in some places but not others. He self-published the game through his own company, Rostherne Games, initially in kit form (hex sheets and colouring instructions) for several years before it was released in a boxed set by Fairmount Simulation Gaming. Watts also sold many individual laminated paper maps covering specific areas of England, Scotland, and India, together with brief instructions and the special dice required.

The German games company Bütehorn published a German-language edition in 1979 titled Dampfross (Steam Steed), and it was given a "Recommended" citation at Spiel des Jahres 1980. The game only sold 1,000 copies, and Bütehorn went bankrupt. Schmidt Spiele acquired the German-language license and Knut-Michael Wolf completely revised the rules. The new edition was released in 1983, and subsequently won the Spiel des Jahres in 1984, resulting in some complaints, since only new game releases are considered; the jury ruled that Schmidt's rules revisions so completely altered the game that the new edition was, in effect, a new game. Dampfross proved enormously popular, selling over 300,000 copies.

Following this success, Games Workshop published a UK edition of Railway Rivals, with a game board made of laminated card, and a map of Central England on one side and the Western USA on the other. Pens, dice and small plastic trains were also included.

Schmidt Spiele marketed several foreigh-language versions in other countries including a Dutch version, Tussen de Rails for Selecta Spel en Hobby, and a Swedish version, Rail, for Alga.

In 1992, a revised version of Dampfross was published by Laurin-Verlag; after Laurin was taken over in 1993, Queen Games continued to publish it.

In 1998 Watts sold the rights to all Rostherne Games to Theo Clarke.

== Reception ==
In Issue 35 of the UK magazine Games & Puzzles, John Deans commented, "It is a natural consequence of a completed game for players to compare their network with that actually in existence. Where the two coincide there is a certain satisfaction in 'being right' and where they do not discussion can arise of value in the developing of the players' grasp of this aspect of Geography. For this is the object of the Railway Rivals game and, while providing entertainment and excitement, they seem to succeed in this." Deans concluded by giving the game a rating of 4 out of 6.

In Issue 10 of Perfidious Albion, Charles Vasey reviewed the game variant set in Ireland and thought it was "a simple and accurate game which is good fun for all ages (it might not be a wargame but blood still flows!)" Vasey questioned the game's balance, since the west coast of Ireland was not very industrialized. Nonetheless, Vasey concluded, "though simple, the game often achieves the same results as occurred in real life. Fun."

In 1984, Brian Cresse reviewed the postal version of Railway Rivals for Imagine magazine, and stated that "Railway Rivals is, deservedly, one of the most popular postal games around, but has failed to gain an equivalent hold on the 'mass' of the games-playing public."

Writing in Issue 78 of Games (August 1986), Sid Sackson called it a "captivating railway game." Although Sackson noted the game can be played by two, "more is definitely merrier."

Games named Railway Rivals one of the Top 100 Games of 1986.

In Issue 33 of the French games magazine Casus Belli, Hal Héretour and J.M. Rubio Nevado pointed out that strategies for the two phases of the game were oppositional, saying, "The winner is always the one who has been able to reconcile the imperatives of the two phases. [In the first phase] we must build an effective network at the lowest cost for the rest of the game ... the second phase decides the fate of the game. You must carefully balance the price of the race, to be paid to your opponents, and the chances of success." Héretour and Nevado concluded on a positive note, writing, "Railway Rivals is a clear game (only four pages of rules), tactically very rich with twists and turns, with some hints of diplomacy. The more players, the better; nevertheless it is a fun game for two."

Rick Heli, writing for Spotlight on Games, called it "a rather satisfying game" and rated it 7 out of 10.

== Awards ==
- Spiel des Jahres 1980: Recommended Game
- Spiel des Jahres 1984: Winner of Game of the Year 1983

== See also ==
- Train game
