= Kingdom Builder =

2011 strategy board game

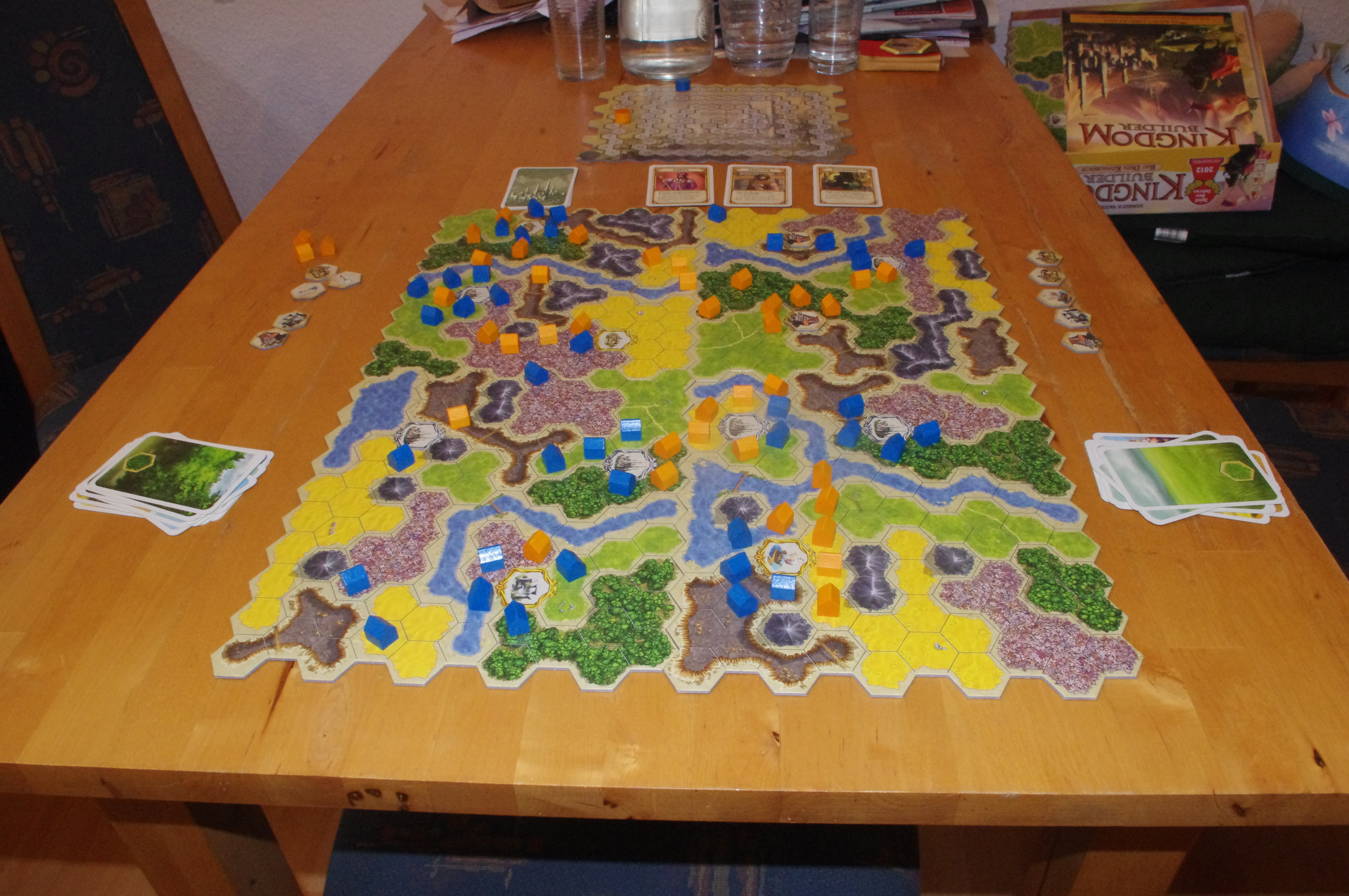
- Designers: Donald X. Vaccarino
- Illustrators: Oliver Schlemmer
- Publishers: Queen Games
- Publication: 2011; 14 years ago
- Players: 2–4 (5 with expansion)
- Playing time: 45 minutes

Kingdom Builder is a strategy board game designed by Donald X. Vaccarino, published in 2011 by Queen Games with illustrations by Oliver Schlemmer in German, British and international versions (English, French, Dutch, Spanish, German).

Kingdom Builder is a construction game in which each player creates a kingdom by placing settlers' houses in various locations. The winner of the game is the player with the most gold. However, the gold is only awarded at the end of the game, according to three sets of rules that were randomly revealed at the beginning. The rules are simple but each game is likely to play out differently due to the random selection of board sections (choosing four from eight) and scoring rules (choosing three from ten), the luck of the draw, and competition for resources. Upon its release, the game received the 2012 Spiel des Jahres (Game of the Year) and placed seventh place in the Deutscher Spiele Preis for 2012.

== Gameplay ==
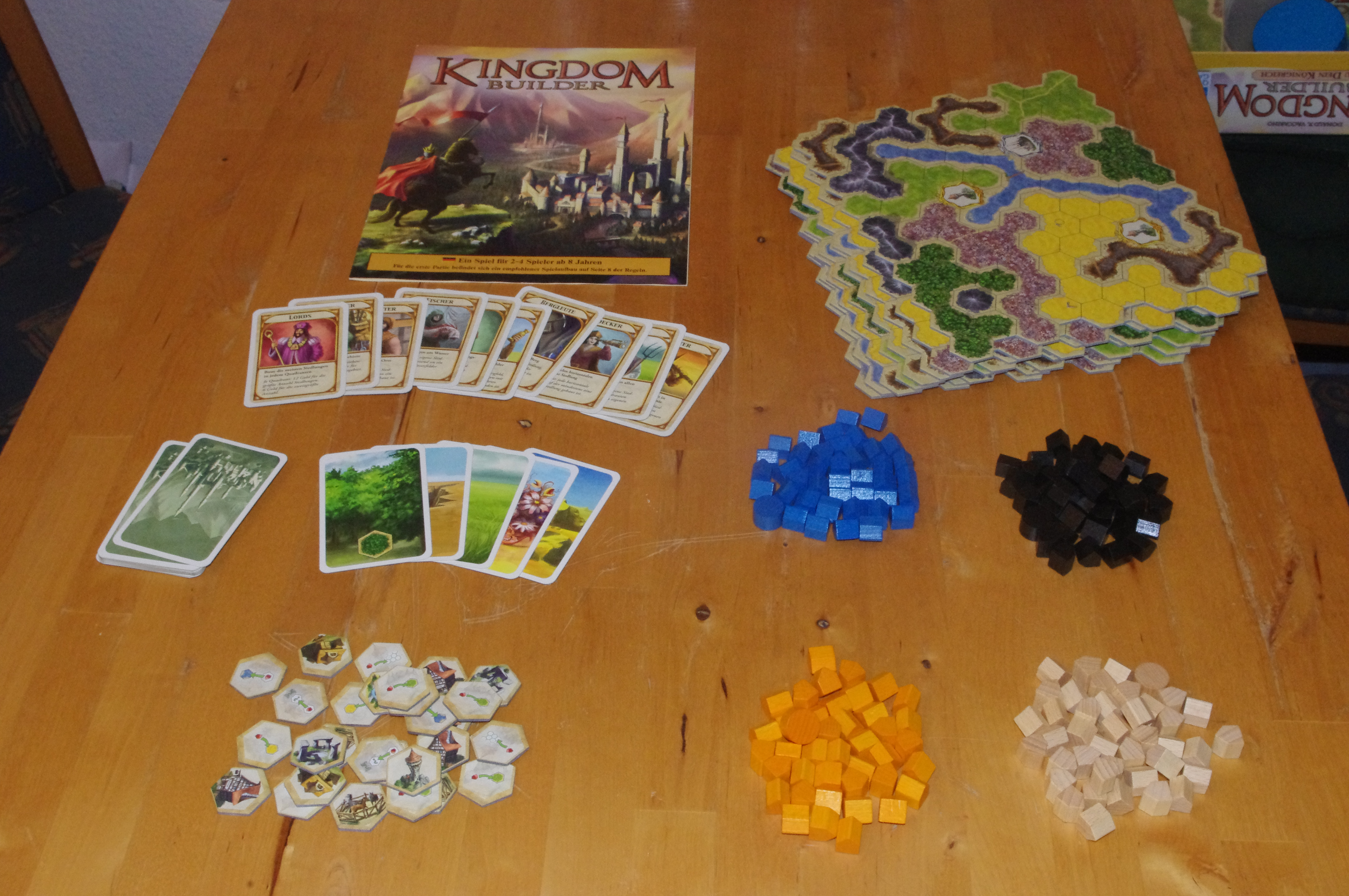
game material

The base game has eight different game board sections composed of 100 terrain hexagons each. Five terrain types are suitable for building: canyon, desert, flower field, forest and grass. Four terrain types are not suitable: castle, "location", mountain and water. At the start of the game four game board sections are selected at random and constructed to form a square game board. Three random Kingdom Builder cards are drawn and displayed, which explain the rules for earning gold in that particular game. For example, one Kingdom Builder card may award gold for settlements next to mountains, while another awards gold for settlements arranged in a horizontal line. Additionally, each player receives three gold for each Castle space adjacent to one or more of their settlements.

Each player's turn consists of:

- Mandatory Action: The active player displays their previously drawn terrain card and places three settlement tokens on unoccupied hexagons of that terrain type according to the building rules.
- Extra Action: For each location tile that a player has accumulated in previous rounds, they may perform an additional, special action authorized by each tile (namely, place an additional settlement or move an existing settlement) before or after the mandatory action.
- Collecting location tiles: Whenever a player builds a settlement adjacent to a location hexagon, they immediately take a location tile, if one is still available at that site and they have not already taken one from that particular site. The player must discard that tile if they ever move their settlements such that none are adjacent to that site.
- Completion of turn: The player discards their terrain card and draws a replacement card to study for their next turn.

The game ends at the completion of the round in which at least one player places their last settlement. Then each player totals their gold according to the several scoring methods. The player with the most gold wins.

== Expansions ==
Several expansions for Kingdom Builder have been released. They contain new game board sections, new locations and more ways for a player to expand their kingdom and receive gold during and at the end of the game.

- Nomads (2012): Contains four new game board sections featuring four new location types and the new Nomads spaces, which replace Castles. When a player builds next to a Nomads space, they get a random Nomad tile which provides a one-time extra action on their next turn. The expansion additionally contains three new kingdom builder cards and game pieces for a fifth player.
- Crossroads (2013): Contains four new game board sections featuring eight new location types, six task cards, 10 warrior pieces, and five ship, city hall, and wagon pieces. The new pieces are used via powers granted by the new locations tiles. The randomly drawn task cards provide additional ways for a player to earn gold, such as by surrounding a location or Castle space entirely with their own settlements.
- Marshlands (2016): Contains four new game board sections featuring four new locations types as well as the new Swamp terrain type, six new kingdom builder cards, and five new swamp terrain cards. This expansion also replaces Castles with Palace spaces, which each provide five gold to the player with the most settlements adjacent to that palace. The swamp terrain cards show two swamp hexes and three hexes of another terrain type, and the player may choose which to build. Additionally, the location spaces in this game provide stronger "bonus actions" to a player who has built next to both of that location's associated hexes.
- Harvest (2017): Contains four new game board sections featuring eight new locations, the new Silo spaces, and the new Farmland terrain type, six new kingdom builder cards, ten numbered settlement coins and two scout figures. The numbered settlement coins and scout figures are used as part of the new location powers. Players may play a settlement once a turn on any farmland space adjacent to an existing settlement. Additionally, after the game end, each player adjacent to a silo space may move three previously placed settlements or build three additional settlements (if they have them in their supply).

Additionally publisher Queen Games has produced three minor expansions, called "Queenies."

- Queenie 1: Capitol (2011): Expands the game with two "Capitol" game pieces that can modify Castle spaces, allowing players to score gold for settlements within two hexes of the capitols.
- Queenie 2: Caves (2012): Expands the game with four "Cave" pieces that are randomly placed on mountain spaces. Players may move a settlement adjacent to a cave space to another hex that is also adjacent to a cave.
- Queenie 3: Island (2014): Contains a smaller, unattached two-sided game board section. Each side has a castle space and a new location tile.

In 2014, Queen Games published a "Big Box" edition of Kingdom Builder containing the base game, the Nomads and Crossroads expansions, and the Capitol and Caves Queenies. In 2017, Queen Games published a second edition of the Big Box which additionally includes the Marshlands and Harvest expansions, and the Island Queenie.

== Reception ==
A board game review in The Wirecutter stated that the game is weaker than similar games in the genre, such as Catan and Carcassonne. A review at Ars Technica states that the game is easy to learn, but requires more "strategic thinking" than beginner-level games. A Finnish-Swedish version was released in 2012 by lautapelit.fi. The review described the game as simple, praising its engagement and scalability while critiquing the theme as abstract.

The game received the 2012 Spiel des Jahres (Game of the Year), with the jury praising its replayability and strategic challenges provided from variable starting positions, additionally stating that "The different starting positions and the importance of luck create new strategic challenges for the players." Deutscher Spiele Preis for 2012 listed it at number 7 out of 10 best games for that year. At BoardGameGeek, it has a rating of 7.0 out of 10 based on over 21,000 user ratings as of Feb 2022. The Big Box 2nd Edition, which includes all the expansions, has a rating of 8.1 out of 10 based on over 500 ratings as of Feb 2022. That's a Good Game feels Kingdom Builder "can be done in less than an hour, and because of its high replay value – we can play again and have a totally different experience."
