= Neil Rabens =

American inventor and artist

Neil Walter Rabens (June 27, 1929-May 18, 2020) was an inventor of the mat game Twister, along with Charles Foley.

== Early life ==
Neil Walter Rabens was born on June 27, 1929, in St. Paul, Minnesota

== Career ==
Neil Rabens was working as an artist and cartoonist when he and prolific game designer Chuck Foley were hired by Reynolds Guyer. Rabens and Foley began working at the Reynolds Guyer Agency of Design in St. Paul in the mid-1960s. Guyer worked with Rabens and Foley to expand on his idea for a game that he was working on, which he initially called "Pretzel", but as this title was already in use they changed the name to Twister, so Foley and Rabens applied for a U.S. patent on April 14, 1966. Rabens sketched the drawings that appeared on the patent as well as the original box for Twister.

Rabens also painted custom signs and murals, and worked as an author, writing and illustrating several children's books, and a musician he played guitar and banjo. Rabens continued for decades to receive letters in the mail asking for his autograph, and said that he could not help but shake his head in response.

== Personal life ==
Rabens served as a church deacon and taught classes for children, and Rabens and his wife were foster parents for 37 children of different backgrounds for more than a decade.

Rabens died in 2020.
