= Hoity Toity =

Board game

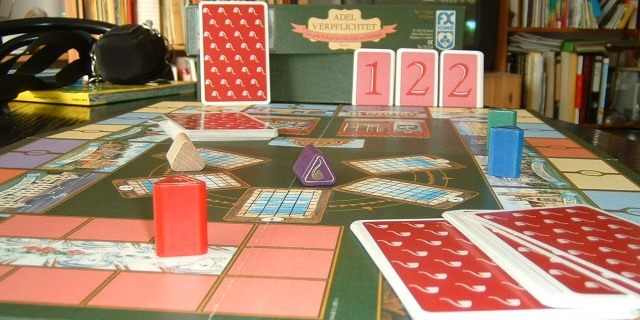
- Designers: Klaus Teuber
- Publishers: Überplay
- Players: 2 to 6
- Setup time: approx. 5 minutes
- Playing time: > 45 minutes
- Chance: Card shuffling
- Age range: 12 years and up
- Skills: Bluffing

Hoity Toity (German: Adel Verpflichtet, pronounced [ˈaːdl̩ fɛɐ̯ˈp͡flɪçtət], lit. 'Noblesse oblige') is a board game created by Klaus Teuber in 1990.

== Publication history ==
German game designer Klaus Teuber created Adel Verpflichtet in 1990, and it was published in Germany by F.X. Schmid. It was also distributed in the United Kingdom under the name Fair Means or Foul, and in the United States both under its German name and as By Hook or Crook. In 2008, Überplay re-released it in the United States using the name Hoity Toity. The game won several awards.

== Gameplay ==
The players in the game represent the members of the pretentious Antique Club who collectively wager which one of them can acquire, by purchase or theft, the most expensive collection of objets d'art in one day. Each member has at their disposal a detective and two thieves.

During each turn, each player must choose to either go to the auction house or go to the castle.

If a player goes to the auction house, the player can either bid on an item in a secret bid process, or send a thief. If only one thief is sent, the thief steals all the cash that was used for bidding. If more than one player sends a thief, then neither is able to steal the cash and the auction proceeds. The auctioned item then goes to the highest bidder.

If a player goes to the castle, the player has three options: exhibit the items collected thus far, which will enable the player to move around the board further towards the end; send a thief to steal something; or send the detective to arrest any thief who is present.

The player who completes a circuit of the board and arrives back in the club first is the winner.

== Reception ==
In the July 1990 edition of Games International, Adel Verpflichtet was featured as "Game of the Month". Brian Walker admired the components, calling them "absolutely top class: beautiful artwork, top quality card stock, and a first class board." He also lauded the element of bluff in the game, saying, "Like so many great games, you must know your opponents, for it is against them you are competing, not the game itself." He also called the movement system "both extremely clever and original." He concluded by giving the game a perfect rating of 10 out of 10, saying, "Believe me, this is a great game in every respect."

== Reviews ==
- Casus Belli #68
- Family Games: The 100 Best

== Awards ==
- 1990 Spiel des Jahres
- 1990 Deutscher Spiele Preis
