= Terraforming Mars (board game) =

2016 strategy board game

- Terraforming Mars box cover
- Designers: Jacob Fryxelius
- Illustrators: Isaac Fryxelius
- Publishers: FryxGames (2016)
- Genres: Board game
- Players: 1–5
- Setup time: 10 minutes
- Playing time: 120 minutes
- Chance: Low-medium (card draws)
- Skills: Strategy, tactics, logic

Terraforming Mars is a board game for 1 to 5 players designed by Jacob Fryxelius and published by FryxGames in 2016, and thereafter by 12 others, including Stronghold Games. In Terraforming Mars, players take the role of corporations working together to terraform the planet Mars by raising the temperature, adding oxygen to the atmosphere, covering the planet's surface with water and creating plant and animal life. The game incorporates elements of resource management, engine building, and strategic planning. Players compete to earn the most victory points, which are measured by their contribution to terraforming and to human infrastructure. These goals are achieved by collecting income and resources which allow them to play various projects, represented by cards that increase their income or resources, build infrastructure, or directly contribute to terraforming the planet. The game was received positively by fans and critics, and received numerous awards.

== Gameplay ==
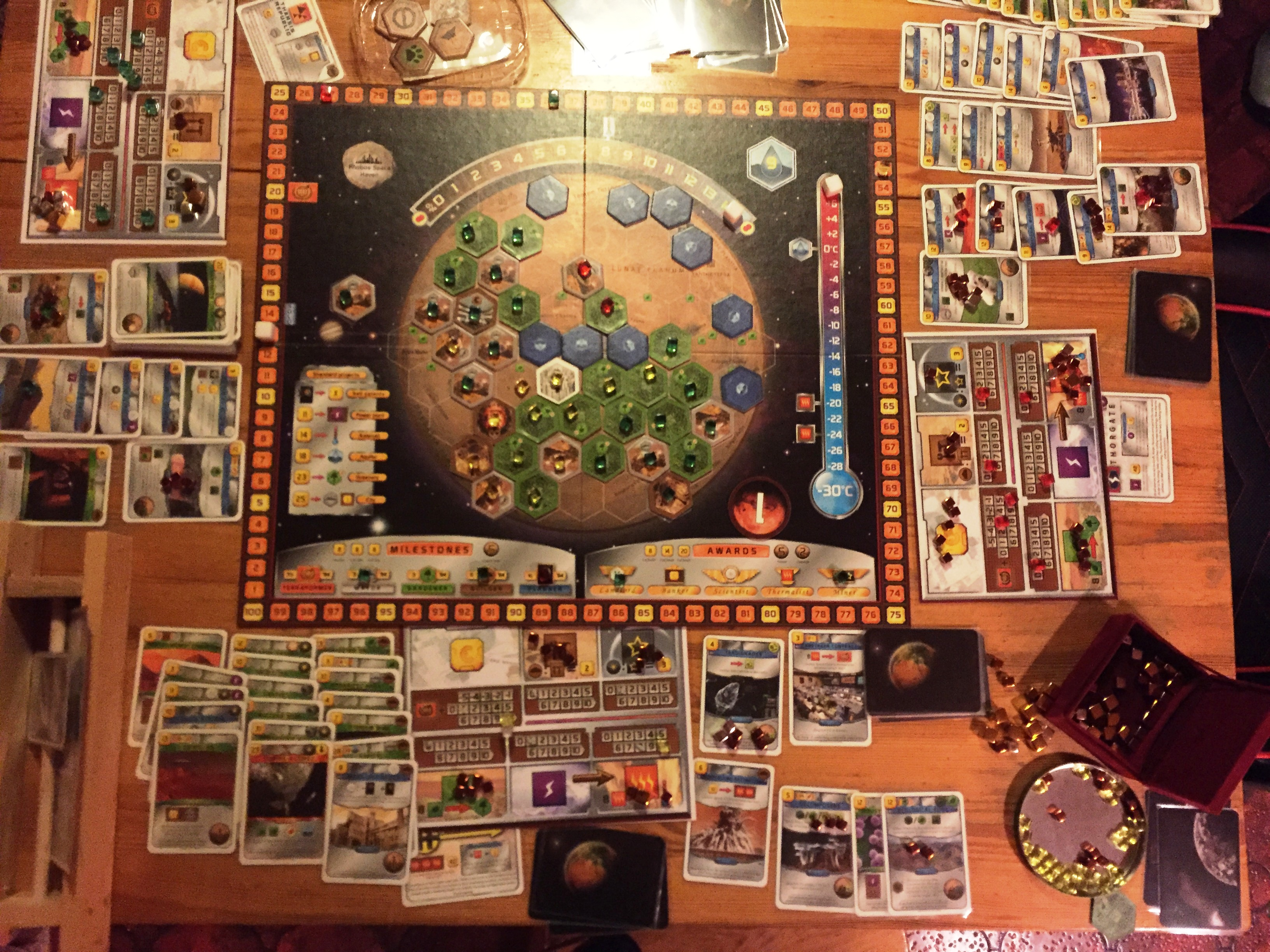
A game of Terraforming Mars that has just been completed

Players represent competing corporations who all have a stake in terraforming Mars. The game board depicts the planet's surface, which is represented by an array of 61 contiguous hexes. Each hex represents about 1% of Mars' surface area. Onto these hexes, players can place oceans, greeneries, cities, and other special tiles. The object of the game is for players to complete three terraforming conditions: raise the atmosphere's oxygen level to 14%; raise the temperature from −30 to +8 degrees Celsius; and cover 9% of Mars' surface by ocean (represented in-game as having 9 ocean tiles placed on Mars).

Players accomplish these goals by playing cards that represent various technologies or buildings used to terraform Mars. The game is played over a number of generations, each represented as one game round. A generation begins with players drawing cards, then players take turns performing actions (which can be playing cards, using the ability of a card already in play or paying for one of the several actions depicted on the board). Once all players have finished taking actions, players collect income and resources according to their production of the different resources, then the next generation begins.

Whenever a player performs an action that advances one of the terraforming conditions, the player's Terraforming Rating (TR) increases. A player's TR not only represents the victory points they have earned during the game, but is also added to a player's money income when collecting income and resources at the end of each generation.

The game ends at the end of any generation when the three terraforming conditions have been met. Then, players count up their points, which come from their final TR, cities and greeneries that they have placed on Mars, achievements they have claimed during the game and cards they have played, and the player with the highest score wins.

== Expansions and spin-offs ==
=== Expansions ===
Ten expansions have been released:

- Hellas and Elysium (2017), which adds a new double-sided board representing two new regions of Mars, with each region having its own terrain layout, milestones, and end-game achievements
- Venus Next (2017), which adds a new side-board representing Venus as a new terraforming opportunity and new Venus-related cards for the deck
- Prelude (2018), which adds Prelude cards that players take during setup to jump-start their production and terraforming
- Colonies (2018), which adds areas around the Solar System for players to colonize and travel to, providing alternative ways of getting resources without having to play cards
- Turmoil (2019), which adds a Martian government with several political factions, each with their own agendas, which players can influence to gain various bonuses
- Prelude 2 (2024), which adds 5 new corporation cards, 25 prelude cards, and 24 project cards
- Milestones and Awards (2024), which allows players to randomize 35 milestones and 35 awards
- Automa (2024), which provides a new solo player mode
- Amazonis & Vastitas (2024), which adds a new double-sided board representing two new regions of Mars, with each region having its own terrain layout, milestones, and end-game achievements, along with longer global parameters in one region; it also includes additional ocean and city/greenery tiles, a Standard Project tile, and a new Venus board
- Utopia & Cimmeria (2024), which adds a new double-sided board representing two new regions of Mars, with each region having its own terrain layout, milestones, and end-game achievements

=== Promos ===
Several seasonal promotional cards have been released that include new corporations, preludes, and project cards.

=== Card adaptation ===
Terraforming Mars: Ares Expedition, a simplified card game version of the original, released in 2021. A dice version was released October 2023. A legacy variant is scheduled for release.

Terraforming Mars: Ares Expedition was reviewed by Charlie Hall from Polygon, who described the game's multiple phases as interesting, but critiqued that it was "a smaller, mostly card-based game leaves behind a few vestigial remnants from the original" that still contained "redundant icons and concepts". Hall additionally criticised the components and rulebook. Reviewing from Ars Technica, Aaron Zimmerman stated that the game was a combination of Race for the Galaxy and the original title, and complimented the engagement and engine-building mechanics. Zimmerman considered that the game's player interaction was "arguably more" than the base game, and considered its components as superior.

=== Video game adaptations ===
A video game adaptation of Terraforming Mars, developed by Asmodee Digital, was released in October 2018. Matt Thrower of Strategy Gamer considered the adaptation to have "too many rough edges to recommend". However, in a list of Best Board Games On PC from the same site he later revised this opinion, saying "developer Asmodee Digital has stepped up the plate with a host of updates. And while the interface remains a bit obtuse, the game itself is shining as it should."

Zen Studios released a Terraforming Mars pinball table for Pinball FX on December 7, 2023.

== Inspiration ==
The base game rulebook acknowledges Kim Stanley Robinson and his Mars trilogy as "great inspiration" to the game. The example players in the rulebook are named Kim, Stanley and Robinson.

== Reception ==
Terraforming Mars received highly positive reviews following its release. Reviewing from Ars Technica, Aaron Zimmerman criticised the "serious art and component weaknesses", but praised the engine-building mechanism, the uniqueness of cards, and variable starting corporate cards, concluding that it is "a crunchy, engaging brain-burner with amazing theme". It was subsequently listed on Ars Technica as one of its 20 best games of 2016. Matt Thrower from IGN also commented positively on the game's replayability. Editors from Polygon stated that the card system was "gripping" and described the game arc was "gratifying"; Terraforming Mars was also listed as its runner up for best game of 2016 and best strategy game of 2016. Similarly, Popular Mechanics named Terraforming Mars as one of its 50 best games of the year. Vulture called it "the best high strategy game of 2016." In an article for The Guardian, Dan Jolin said that the projects "synergise in many different and rewarding ways", and stated that "isn't just a great science game, it's a great game full stop".

The game was nominated for the 2017 Kennerspiel des Jahres award for Best Strategy Game of the Year. It won Best Family/Adult Game at the 2017 Deutscher Spiele Preis. From 2019 to 2020, Terraforming Mars peaked as the 3rd ranked board game on BoardGameGeek.

The expansions to the game were also received positively. Hellas and Elysium and Venus Next were the two runners-up for the Golden Geek award for the best expansion to a game in 2017. Prelude has been received very well by critics for speeding up the beginning phase by giving each player extra abilities at the start of the game.

== Media tie-ins ==
In 2021, a tie-in novel based on the game by author Jane Killick called In the Shadow of Deimos was published by Aconyte Books. In 2022, a second novel titled Edge of Catastrophe was released by Jane Killick. In 2024, a third novel titled Shores of a New Horizon was released by M. Darusha Wehm.
