= Labyrinth (board game) =

Board game

- Manufacturers: Ravensburger
- Designers: Max Kobbert
- Publication: 1986
- Players: 2-4
- Age range: 7 and up
- Website: Official website

Labyrinth is a board game for two to four players, published by Ravensburger in 1986.

== Gameplay ==
The game board forms a maze built of both fixed and moving pieces. The players rearrange the maze to their advantage by moving a row of pieces in turn. Each player has one token, which they move in the maze. The player's goal is to collect treasures in the labyrinth and then return to their own starting position. The treasures appear in the cards that are dealt to the players in the beginning of the game.

The player is allowed to see only the card that shows their current destination. The player has to reveal the card when they reach the destination, and take a new card from their pile. The other players notice when the pile is empty, and then usually try to prevent the leading player from returning to the starting position. Advanced players also try to guess other players' destinations in order to make their proceeding more difficult or try to trap them in dead ends.

== History and related games ==
The game was designed by the German psychologist Max Kobbert and published by Ravensburger under the name "Das verrückte Labyrinth", which is a pun on the German words "verrücken" (displace) and "verrückt" (crazy), roughly translatable in English as "labyrinthal disorder". In English-speaking countries, the name was initially translated as "THE aMAZEing LABYRINTH", but the pun was dropped in subsequent versions.

Ravensburger has published a number of follow-on labyrinth games, starting with an advanced version of the game, Master Labyrinth, created by Kobbert in 1991. This version of the game won the 1991 Mensa Select award, the 1991 Deutscher Spiele Preis, and the Spiel des Jahres special award for "most beautiful game". It was followed by Junior Labyrinth (1995), a simplified version on a smaller board with fewer items to find; Secret Labyrinth (1998), a version on a circular board with simplified combat; the Labyrinth Card Game (2000); 3-D Labyrinth (2002), a version with a plastic 3D board; Lord of the Rings Labyrinth, a book/movie themed version; Labyrinth Treasure Hunt (2005), a version which features simultaneous play; and a dragon-themed version again called Master Labyrinth (2007).

In February 2008, videogame website DS-x2.com reported that dtp entertainment was planning a Nintendo DS version of the board game. Three months later, they included screenshots of the game, but ultimately it was never released.

In 2009-2010, the RIT CS department adopted the game for a freshman-level CS project in the Python programming language.

In July 2010, LEGO game Harry Potter Hogwarts (number 3862) was released that follows a similar game mechanic. Each player must collect one copy of each of four items and return to their start position. At the start of each player's turn the player rolls the dice to determine in what way they can change the layout of the board.

== Reviews ==
- Jeux & Stratégie #39
- Games #86
- Family Games: The 100 Best
