= Outset Media =

Canadian board games and puzzles company

Outset Media Corporation
- Type: Private
- Founded: British Columbia (1996)
- Founder: David Manga
- Headquarters: Warehouse in Brampton, Ontario and Buffalo, New York, Victoria, British Columbia, Canada
- Area served: Worldwide
- Key people: David Manga (CEO)
- Products: Games, Puzzles
- Number of employees: ~55
- Website: outsetmedia.com

Outset Media Corporation is a Canadian company that develops and distributes family entertainment products, specializing in board games, party games, card games, and jigsaw puzzles. In addition to developing its own games, Outset Media also distributes games and puzzles in Canada for United States–based companies.

== History ==
The company was founded in 1996 by 23-year-old university student David Manga, originally with the sole purpose of publishing and distributing a single board game called All Canadian Trivia. Development of the product was 16 months. The original edition of All Canadian Trivia was released in May 1997. While the Original edition went on to become a Canadian bestseller - breaking 100,000 copies sold in Canada, the French edition was a flop and sold less than 3,000 copies.

A limited print-run Millennium Edition of All Canadian Trivia was released in 1999. The game's creator embarked on a two-month guerilla marketing campaign across Canada to promote the game. David Manga was selected as one of a hundred young Canadians to watch in the new millennium by Maclean's magazine.

In 2002, Outset Media nearly closed its doors after its largest customer, Stewart House Publishing, a former gift division of book publisher McClelland & Stewart, ran into financial difficulties and went into bankruptcy. With nearly 50% of its annual revenue in bad debt and unrecoverable, Outset Media was bailed out with angel investments from family members and financing from the Royal Bank of Canada. Later that year, Outset Media added a new division, distributing other companies' games in Canada, when it began to distribute the line of "opoly" games from US-based Late for the Sky.

In 2003, Outset Media made its first appearance on the Profit magazine's annual ranking of Canada's Fastest-Growing Companies. The company would appear on the Profit 100 list for six consecutive years from 2003 to 2008.

== Professor Noggin's ==
Outset Media's most recognized brand is the Professor Noggin's series of educational card games. First published in 2002, the series now includes 39 different titles, and has garnered 14 international toy awards to date. Over 1,000,000 copies have been sold worldwide, and the series has been translated into French as "Professeur Caboche".

== Cobble Hill Puzzles ==
The Cobble Hill Puzzle Company is the sister company of Outset Media Corporation. The Cobble Hill brand is exclusively distributed by Outset Media in North America and has a worldwide distribution in 25 international markets. Cobble Hill big box puzzles are wholly made in the USA. The jigsaw puzzle, box board, and shrink film are 100% recyclable and the brand is considered environmentally friendly meeting all CONEG requirements, as well as meeting and exceeding all requirements by the CPSIA. The line includes 2000 piece, 1000 piece, 500 piece, 350 piece Family puzzles, 275 piece Easy Handling puzzles, 60 piece, Floor Puzzles and Tray Puzzles.

In 2018, Cobble Hill puzzles are used throughout the Sony Picture Classics film, Puzzle (2018 film), directed by Marc Turtletaub and written by Oren Moverman. Cobble Hill puzzles are used as props for the retail store and are widely seen in the Theatrical release poster, as well as throughout the Official Movie Trailer.

== Supplier of the Year ==
The Neighbourhood Toy Stores of Canada (NETS), a non-profit association representing independent toy retailers across Canada, has named Outset Media the "Supplier of the Year" six times (2004–2007, 2011, and 2013-2014), beating out companies such as Hasbro, Irwin Toy, Lego, Mattel, and Playmobil.

In 2013, Outset Media was named Supplier of the Year by the Canadian Gift Association (CGA), formerly CGTA. This is the first time CGA has awarded a company who isn't focused specifically on the gift industry.

== International partnerships ==
Outset Media has developed distribution partnerships with several European and American game and puzzle companies, including MindWare, Patch Products (now PlayMonster), Fat Brain Toys, Royal & Langnickel, Late for the Sky, SmartLab Toys, Pressman Toy Corporation, Goliath Games, Popular Playthings, Cheatwell Games, Maranda, Monkey Business Sports, Cobble Hill Puzzles, and D-Toys Puzzles.

The Canadian company had also partnered with American book publisher Simon & Schuster to launch authorized Nancy Drew board games and jigsaw puzzles.

== List of products ==
=== Games developed by Outset Media ===
- All American Trivia
- All Canadian Trivia
- American Trivia Family Edition
- Artifact, The Hunt for Stolen Treasure
- Beam Me Up
- Camper Damper
- Canada-Opoly
- Canadian Trivia Family Edition
- Charades In-A-Box
- Chicago Cribbage
- Conjecture
- Family Scavenger Hunt
- The Great Dragon Race
- Nancy Drew Collector
- Nancy Drew Mysteries Board Game
- Noggin Playground Preschool Games
- Pond Hockey-Opoly
- Professor Noggin's
- Quebec-Opoly
- Rhyme Thyme
- Silent But Deadly
- Skullduggery
- Ultimate Baseball Trivia
- Ultimate Hockey Trivia
- What?
- What? Girls Night Edition

=== Games licensed by Outset Media ===
- Car Tag
- Dung Deck
- Fart
- Humm Bug
- Kids Charades
- Know Your Partner
- MindTrap
- PickTwo
- Saucy Charades
- SideLinks
- Telepaths
- Them and Us
- Theories
- Word Thief

=== Games distributed in Canada by Outset Media ===
- 5 Second Rule
- Bed Bugs
- BuzzWord
- CrossCribb
- Farkle
- Horse-Opoly
- Malarky
- Q-Bitz
- Qwirkle
- Stratego
- What's Yours Like
- Word Shout
