= Cabo (game) =

Commercial card game

- Type: Draw and discard
- Players: 2–5
- Age range: 8+
- Cards: 52
- Playing time: 45 minutes
- Chance: Medium
- Website: https://beziergames.com/products/cabo

Cabo is a 2010 card game by Melissa Limes and Mandy Henning that involves memory and manipulation based on the classic Golf card game and is similar to Rat-a-Tat Cat (1995). The game uses a dedicated deck of cards with each suit numbered from 0 to 13, and certain numbers being marked as "Peek", "Spy" or "Swap". The objective of the game is for each player to minimize the sum of their own cards, four of which are played face-down to the table at the start of a round. Face-down cards may be revealed and swapped by card effects.

Cabo combines elements from shedding and matching type card games. It is similar to the traditional card game Golf and the 1995 Mensa Select award-winner Rat-a-Tat Cat.

Cabo can also be played with a standard playing card deck, and goes under names including Cambio, Pablo and Cactus.

== Gameplay ==
Each player is dealt 4 cards, face down. After each deal, players may peek at any 2 of their own cards.

In clockwise order, players do any of three things:

- pick a card from the draw pile, and either keep the card (placing one of their own cards on the discard pile) or discard it (if the card drawn and discarded is a choice card, the choice card can be used if so desired).
- pick a card from the discard pile and place one of their own cards on the discard pile
- call "Cabo"

Whenever a player discards cards from their hand, they may discard any number of cards of the same rank. If a player discards all of their cards they are considered safe and their value can not move from 0. If a player draws then discards a "choice" card, they may choose to use its ability, as follows:

- 7 or 8: the player may "peek" at one of their own cards
- 9 or 10: "spy" on one of another player's cards
- 11 or 12: swap any two cards on the table, of any player

When a player calls cabo, the other players each get one more turn and then everyone has to turn their hidden cards face-up, and lay down the cards from their hand. The player with the lowest score wins.

== Editions and variants ==
The second edition of Cabo, published by Bezier Games, was published in April 2019. It includes changes such as new artwork, modified rules, a scorepad, and four player reference cards. Rules modifications include:

- Plays 2–4 players (instead of 2–5)
- Cards taken from the discard pile remain face up for the rest of the game (instead of always keeping cards face down)
- Penalty for non-matching cards: Keep all cards including the one drawn — one more per additional cards that do not match (instead of no penalty)
- 10 point penalty for missing a cabo call (instead of 5)
- All players score the sum of their points; if the caller has (or is tied for) the lowest sum, they get 0 points (instead of the lowest player always receiving 0 points)
- The round ends after a call or when the deck runs out (instead of just when Cabo is called)
- Limit of one reset to 50 when your score = 100 exactly (instead of unlimited resets)

The third edition of Cabo, published by Shareful Games, LLC was published in February 2025, and is distributed in all of the Americas. It brings back the original artwork by Raleigh, NC artist, Adam Peele, clarified rules, and gameplay instruction cards in English, Spanish, and Portuguese. The third edition brings back 2–5 players to retain international consistency with Smiling Monster, the German license holder for Cabo. No other officially licensed publishers exist.

=== Silver ===
In August 2019, Bezier Games released Silver, a variant with additional rules modifications and a werewolf theme. Changes include:

- New artwork to reflect the theme
- Every card value features a different ability (instead of only Peek, Swap, and Spy on some cards)
- Plays 2–4 players
- Five cards in front of each player (instead of four)
- A penalty for failing to match cards in an exchange
- Four rounds of play in a game (instead of playing to 100 points)
- The lowest sum of points does not automatically score zero
- Removal of the kamikaze rule
- Removal of the 100-point rule

== Folk versions ==
The traditional card game of four-card golf is played with a standard deck of playing cards, and when played with "power cards" house rules it is the same as Cabo.

A simple version of the game played in Malaysia has the following power cards:

- A Jack allows a player to look at one of their own cards (without their opponent seeing it)
- A Queen allows a player to look at one of their opponent's cards (again without their opponent seeing)
- A King allows a player to swap one of their own cards with that of their opponent
- A Joker allows a player to change the positions of their opponent's cards

When a power card is drawn from the stock, it can either be used for its normal value or discarded to activate its power. (If a power card is drawn from the discards, it must be played as its number.)

John McLeod of Pagat.com speculates that these variants are Spanish in origin, as the game is recorded as being played by students in Spain, and many of its variant names are Spanish words (cambio meaning "exchange").
