= Terrace =

Terrace may refer to:

== Landforms and construction ==
- Fluvial terrace, a natural, flat surface that borders and lies above the floodplain of a stream or river
- Terrace, a street suffix
- Terrace, the portion of a lot between the public sidewalk and the street
- Terrace (earthworks), a leveled surface built into the landscape for agriculture or salt production
- Terrace (building), a raised flat platform
- Terrace garden, an element where a raised flat paved or gravelled section overlooks a prospect
- Terrace (geology), a step-like landform that borders a shoreline or river floodplain
- Terraced house, a style of housing where identical individual houses are cojoined into rows
- Terrace, the roof of a building, especially one accessible to the residents for various purposes
- Terrace, a sidewalk cafe
- Terrace (stadium), standing spectator areas, especially in Europe and South America, or the sloping portion of the outfield in a baseball stadium, not necessarily for seating, but for practical or decorative purposes
- Terraced wall, a wall which is divided into sections, as in, is not a single wall; they are terraced.

== Places ==
=== Settlements ===
- Terrace, British Columbia, a community in Canada
- Terrace, Utah, a ghost town in the Great Salt Lake Desert, US

=== Other places ===
- Mutual Street Arena, a defunct ice rink in Toronto, Canada, later a roller-skating rink called The Terrace
- St Joseph's College, Gregory Terrace, or just Terrace, a private Christian Brothers school in Brisbane, Queensland, Australia
- Terrace F. Club, a Princeton University eating club
- Terraces (Bahá'í), garden terraces at the Shrine of the Bab on Mount Carmel in Haifa, Israel
- The Terrace, Barnes, a street in the London Borough of Richmond upon Thames, UK
- The Terrace, Wellington, a major street in Wellington, New Zealand
- The Terrace (Greensboro, North Carolina), a facility at the Greensboro Coliseum Complex, US
- The Terrace (Somerville College, Oxford), a café and bar at the University of Oxford, UK

== Arts, entertainment, and media ==
- Terrace, a dome from the video game Super Mario Galaxy
- Terrace (board game), an abstract strategy game played on a terraced board
- Terrace (solitaire), a solitaire card game also called Queen of Italy
- Terrace melodic motion in music
- The Terrace, a 1963 Argentine film
- The Terrace, 1909, a painting by Milly Childers

== Other uses ==
- Tone terracing in phonetics

== People with the name ==
=== Given name ===
- Terrace Marshall Jr. (born 2000), American football player
- Terrace Martin (born 1978), American rap musician

=== Surname ===
- Herbert S. Terrace (born 1936), American psychologist
- Michael Terrace (1925–2018), American dancer and choreographer

== See also ==
- East Terrace, a street in Adelaide, Australia
- North Terrace a street in Adelaide, Australia
- South Terrace (disambiguation)
- West Terrace, Adelaide, a street in Australia
- West Terrace, Barbados, a populated place
