= Skullduggery (board game) =

Children's board game

- Box art and playing field
- Publishers: Outset Media
- Players: 2–4
- Playing time: 30 minutes
- Age range: Ages 8 and up

Skullduggery, is a children's board game designed to teach basic logic and strategy. It was created and illustrated by Allegra Vernon, Creative Director of Outset Media. The pirate-themed game is played on a tiled board, with tokens representing the players. The game uses pirates and gemstones as enemies to create obstacles, which lends to its name. Each player works to uncover four landmarks in order to complete a treasure map and race to the treasure.

The tile game was manufactured by Outset Media, the same company that distributes Qwirkle, another tile-based game, that also won a Mensa Select Mind Game Award in 2007. Only five awards are given each year by American Mensa.

== Awards ==
- Mensa Select
- National Parenting Center Seal of Approval
- Parent's Choice Recommendation
- Creative Child Magazine, Creative Toy Top Game of the Year Award
- Canadian Toy Testing Council, 3-Star Rating
