= Mindtrap (disambiguation) =

Mindtrap is a computer game.

Mindtrap may also refer to:

- MindTrap, a series of lateral thinking board games
- Cour'souvra, a fictional device in the Wheel of Time series
