= Bill Malarkey =

Bill Malarkey may refer to:

- Bill Malarkey (baseball) (1878–1956), American baseball player
- Bill Malarkey (politician) (1951–2020), Manx politician

== See also ==
- Malarkey (disambiguation)
