= Schogini Systems =

Indian software company

Schogini Systems Pvt Ltd
- Type: Private
- Industry: Software Development, Mobile Applications
- Founded: 1997
- Headquarters: Trivandrum, India
- Key people: Sreeprakash N
- Website: http://schogini.in/

Schogini Systems Private Ltd. is an ISO 9001:2008 Certified Software company that creates gaming and educational applications for iOS (iPhone, iPad), and Android. They develop E-commerce and electronics products. This company headquartered in Technopark, Trivandrum started operating since 1997, with US Incorporation since 2000 as Schogini, Inc.

An eco-alert app developed by this firm has received applause from the President of United States of America, Barack Obama.

One of their international interns, Unmesh, who won the AppAthon 'Silicon Valley Comes to UK' 2011 Competition was awarded by the British Prime Minister, David Cameron.

During a press meet they unveiled 2 apps: Chess, and Khet, to bring educational games to teenagers. The company was praised by the press for their out-of-the-box ideas of implementing few disaster alert apps for the domestic market.

Altruicity, an image processing and augmented reality app, is currently shortlisted and competing in the NYC Big Apps 3.0 contest.

Recently, Schogini Systems has successfully developed and tested an Augmented reality siren (ARS) that can detect dam fissures, can be used at unmanned railway crossings, and out at sea.

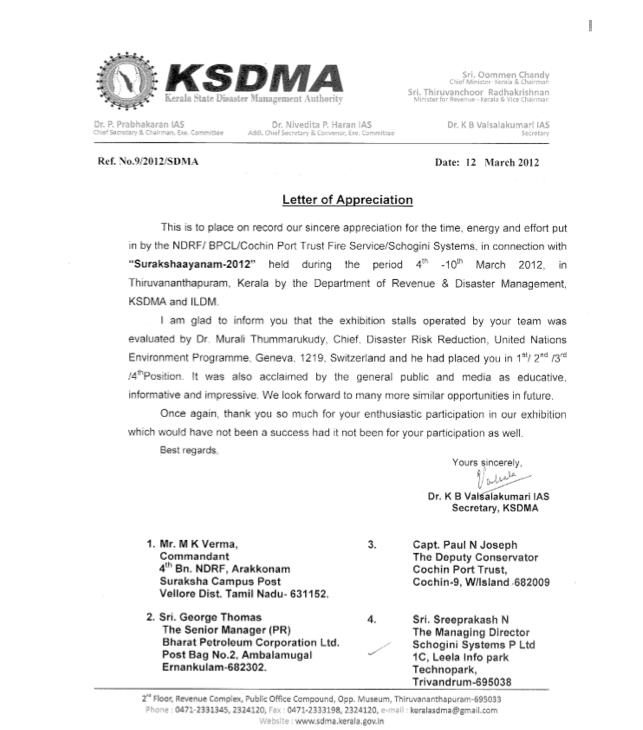
Letter Of Appreciation For Schogini Systems.

The mobile application showcased by the company at 'Surakshaayanam' — the international workshop on disaster reduction and contingency planning organized by Government of Kerala — can send warning signals to distant places, if a fissure is found on the surface. The solar-powered wireless system can be used as a mobile application and also as a separate equipment in strategic areas. In case of a major disaster, it is often difficult to find out the details of the victims. A QR code developed by the company can include the entire information about the victims and casualties.

Schogini Systems won the fourth place in 'Surakshaayanam'. The stall was evaluated by Dr. Murali Thummarukudy, Chief, Disaster Risk Reduction, United Nations Environment Programme, Geneva, 1219, Switzerland.

Schogini also partnered with Don Dailey, Larry Kaufman and Luke Hooper to implement Komodo 4, a top rated Chess engine.

Schogini Systems has appointed FIDE-ranked chess player Mohammed Salih, who is blind by birth, as their "Brand ambassador – Intelligent Interfaces".

As part of the new strategy, Salih challenged laser game Khet's inventor Luke Hooper for a game, at the Schogini office at Leela Inforpark, on the Technopark campus. Salih lost the match 1-0. Commenting on the game, Luke Hooper said that Salih had put up a brave fight before he lost the game, which lasted more than an hour.
