= Malarkey =

Malarkey may refer to:

== Persons ==
- Bill Malarkey (baseball) (1878-1956), American baseball pitcher
- Bill Malarkey (politician) (1951-2020), Manx politician
- Donald Malarkey (1921–2017), American soldier who fought in World War II
- Gary Malarkey (born 1953), former Australian rules footballer
- John Malarkey (1872–1949), American baseball pitcher
- Michael Malarkey (born 1983), American actor and singer
- Alex and Kevin Malarkey, authors of The Boy Who Came Back from Heaven, a 2010 Christian book

== Others ==
- Malarkey (board game), published by Parker Brothers
- XS Malarkey, an award-winning, not-for-profit comedy club in Fallowfield, Manchester
- The Malarkey, the 2009 winning entry in the National Poetry Competition
- Simple J. Malarkey, a caricature of Senator Joseph McCarthy in Walt Kelly's Pogo (comic strip)
- "No Malarkey!", a campaign slogan for Joe Biden's 2020 presidential campaign

== See also ==
- Malarky, a different board game
