= List of Mensa Select recipients =

Mensa Select is an annual award given by American Mensa since 1990 to five board games that are "original, challenging and well designed". The awards are presented at the annual Mensa Mind Games competition.

== Past winners ==
Year	Location	Winners
1990	New York, NY	Abalone; Scattergories; Taboo; Tribond; Trivial Pursuit: Genus Edition
1991	New York, NY	Clue: The Great Museum Caper; Lapis; Master Labyrinth; Pyramis; Set
1992	New York, NY	Kinesis; Q4; Terrace; Traverse; Why Not?
1993	New York, NY	Farook; Inklings; Overturn; Quadrature; Quarto
1994	New York, NY	Char; Chung Toi; Down Fall; Magic: The Gathering; Pylos
1995	New York, NY	Continuo; Duo (game); Quixo; The Great Dalmuti; Wordspin Scramble
1996	Atlanta, GA	6 nimmt! (also called Take 5!); Pirateer; Quadwrangle; Rat-a-Tat Cat; Touche
1997	Chicago, IL	Hattrick; Quoridor; Rush Hour; Sagarian; Stops
1998	Phoenix, AZ	Avalam; Cube Checkers; Kram; Spy Alley; Wadjet
1999	Seattle, WA	Apples to Apples; Bollox (Also called Boku); Doubles Wild; Fluxx; Quiddler
2000	Atlanta, GA	3 Stones; Finish Lines; Imaginiff...; Time's Up!; ZÈRTZ (in the GIPF project)
2001	Medina, OH	Brainstrain; Dao; Metro; Shapes Up!; Thepollgame
2002	Minneapolis, MN	Curses!; DVONN (in the GIPF project); Muggins; Smart Mouth; The Legend of Landlock
2003	Houston, TX	Blokus; Cityscape; Fire & Ice; Octiles; TransAmerica
2004	Chicago, IL	10 Days in Africa; Basari; Rumis; The Bridges of Shangri-La; YINSH (in the GIPF project)
2005	Tampa, FL	Da Vinci's Challenge; Ingenious; Loot; Niagara; Zendo
2006	Portland, OR	Deflexion (now called "Khet"); Hive; Keesdrow; Pentago; Wits and Wagers
2007	Pittsburgh, PA	Gemlok; Gheos; Hit or Miss (not to be confused with Hit or Miss, a solitaire card game); Qwirkle; Skullduggery
2008	Phoenix, AZ	AmuseAmaze; Eye Know; Jumbulaya; Pixel; Tiki Topple
2009	Cincinnati, OH	Cornerstone; Dominion; Marrakech; Stratum; Tic-Tac-Ku
2010	San Diego, CA	Anomia; Dizios; Forbidden Island; Word on the Street; Yikerz!
2011	Albany, NY	InStructures; Pastiche; Pirate versus Pirate; Stomple; Uncle Chestnut's Table Gype (Eternal Revolution)
2012	Herndon, VA	Coerceo; Iota; Mine Shift; Snake Oil; Tetris Link
2013	St. Louis, MO	Forbidden Desert; Ghooost!; KerFlip!; Kulami; Suburbia
2014	Austin, TX	Euphoria: Build a Better Dystopia; Gravwell: Escape from the 9th Dimension; Pyramix; Qwixx; The Duke
2015	San Diego, CA	Castles of Mad King Ludwig; Dragonwood; Lanterns: The Harvest Festival; Letter Tycoon; Trekking the National Parks
2016	Wheeling, IL	Circular Reasoning; Favor of the Pharaoh; New York 1901; The Last Spike; World’s Fair 1893
2017	Herndon, VA	Amalgam; Around the World In 80 Days; Clank!; Harry Potter: Hogwarts Battle; Imagine
2018	Denver, CO	Azul; Constellations: The Game of Stargazing and the Night Sky; Ex Libris; Photosynthesis; Raiders of the North Sea
2019	Wadsworth, OH	Architects of the West Kingdom; Gizmos; Gunkimono; Planet; Victorian Masterminds
2020	~~Irving, TX~~	No games selected
2021	Houston, TX	Bermuda Pirates; ClipCut Parks; Gates of Delirium; Gridopolis; Ishtar: Gardens of Babylon; Kodama 3D; Mental Blocks; Stripes; Village Pillage; WHO KNOWS WHO
2022	S. Portland, ME	Atheneum: Mystic Library; Genotype: A Mendelian Genetics Game; Life of a Chameleon; Miyabi; Shifting Stones
2023	Columbus, OH	Trekking Through History; Mille Fiori; Gartenbau; Akropolis; boop.
2024	Charlotte, NC	Abducktion; First in Flight: A Historical Aviation Board Game; In the Footsteps of Darwin; The Vale of Eternity; Wandering Towers
2025	Portland, OR	Agueda: City of Umbrellas; Diatoms; Farms Race Deluxe Edition; HUTAN; In the Footsteps of Marie Curie; Plundering Times; Treasure of the Dragons
