= Wadjet (board game) =

Board game

Wadjet is a board game similar to Clue that was published by Timbuk II in 1996.

== Description ==
Wadjet is a board game for 2–4 players based on the discovery of the Tomb of Tutankhamun by Howard Carter and Lord Carnarvon in 1923. The board game is set some months after the discovery, when Carter had removed some of the treasures from the tomb. Someone has stolen twenty-five of them from the base camp, and the players take on the roles of archaeologists who are trying to recover the treasures.

== Components ==
The game box holds:

- the game board
- four Expedition Records folders, and a pad of Expedition Records
- four busts of archaeologists
- decks of cards
- paper money
- two six-sided dice
- four pencils
- rulebook

== Gameplay ==
24 of the treasures are put into four tombs (6 per tomb). One treasure is sequestered away in a fifth tomb and becomes the treasure that must be found in order to win. Similar to the board game Clue, players accomplish this by entering the four tombs and finding the other treasures. Then by process of elimination, players can deduce which treasure lies in the 5th tomb. A player wins by accumulating at least $40,000 of treasures and correctly identifying which treasure is hidden in the 5th tomb.

== Publication history ==
Wadjet was designed by Dee Pomerleau and was published by Timbuk II in 1996.

== Reception ==
The reviewer from Pyramid #28 (Nov./Dec., 1997) stated that "In short, this is one of the most pleasant games to look at you'll ever come across. The setting is equally appealing: the Carter archaeological dig which discovered King Tut's tomb in 1923."

In a retrospective review written in 2014, the family game review site Growing Up with Games called the game "beautifully illustrated", and gave it a strong recommendation, saying, "Celebrate the discovery of the boy king’s tomb and dig up a vintage copy of Wadjet!"

== Awards ==
- At the 1998 Origins Awards, Wadjet and Successors (Avalon Hill) were tied as winners of Best Graphic Presentation of a Board Game of 1997.
- The game was selected as a 1998 Mensa Select recipient.
