= Rat-a-Tat Cat =

Card game

Rat-a-Tat Cat is a memory card game designed by Monty and Ann Stambler and published by Gamewright. It won a Mensa Select award in 1996. The Washington Post described it as "like poker for kids".

It is similar to the card game Golf that uses a standard 52-card deck, which also serves as the base for the 2010 card game Cabo.

== Cards ==
The game consists of a deck of cards: four sets of cards numbered from 0 through to 8, nine copies of the 9 card, and three of each of the action cards ("Peek", "Swap" and "Draw 2").

== Setup ==
Each player is dealt four cards that are placed, face down, in a row in front of him or her. Before the first turn, each player looks at the two outermost cards in their row. Alternatively, all players may choose to flip their outermost cards face-up. Players may not look at any cards during the game except through the use of a "Peek" card. The remaining cards form a draw pile, and the top one is turned over to form a discard pile (if this card is an action card, it is shuffled back into the draw pile and a replacement is dealt).

== Gameplay ==
The objective is to have the fewest points at the end of the game. The points are the total of all cards the player has at the end of the round. Therefore, players try to get rid of high-value cards and get low ones. Since cards are left face-down, memory is a very important part of this game. At the beginning of each round, players can look at their outer face-down cards before the first player takes a turn.

On his or her turn, the player takes a card. This can either be the top card of the discard pile (so long as it is not an action card), or the top card of the draw pile. When taking a card from the discard pile, the player must replace one of own face-down cards with that card, then put the replaced card face-up into the discard pile. When drawing a card from the draw pile, the player can choose to replace one of own face-down cards with that card, or put the drawn card directly into the discard pile.

Whenever the draw pile is exhausted, the discard pile is reshuffled and placed face-down.

Action cards may only be used when they are taken from the draw pile. They cannot be taken from the discard pile and do nothing if found among the face-down cards. After use, they are immediately put into the discard pile. If an action card is taken from the draw pile, it has the following effect:

- If a "Peek" card is drawn, the player may immediately look at one of his or her face-down cards.
- If a "Swap" card is drawn, the player may switch one of his or her cards with one of any other player's cards. However, the player is still not allowed to look at either card. This is the only action card whose activation is optional.
- If a "Draw 2" card is drawn, the player then draws another card from the draw pile and may use this card as if it were a normal turn. However, if it is a number card and is discarded, or if it is an action card and the player decides not to use it, the player then picks another card from the pile, and plays that as if it were a normal turn.

At the end of his or her turn, the player may choose to end the round by saying "rat-a-tat-cat". All other players get one more turn, and then all players count up their points. Any revealed action cards at the end of the round are put into the discard pile and replaced with drawn number cards from the draw pile.

Before the start of the game, the players can decide how the game ends. They may play for an agreed-upon length of time or number of rounds, after which the player with the fewest points total wins the game. The game may also be played such that when a player exceeds a certain points total, either the game ends immediately and the winner for the fewest points total is declared or that player is eliminated and the game continues until one player remains and is declared the winner.
