= Bōku =

Strategy board game

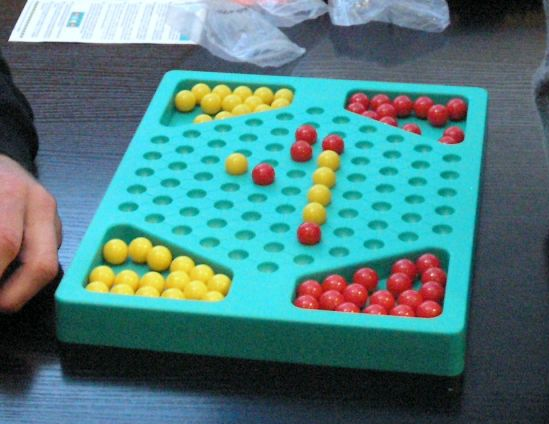
Bōku

Bōku is an abstract strategy board game played with marbles on a perforated hexagonal board with 80 spaces. The object of the game is to arrange five marbles in a row. The game has also been sold under the name Bollox, and later Bolix and won a Mensa Select award in 1999.

Invented by Rob Nelson, the former Portland Mavericks left-handed pitcher and creator of Big League Chew bubblegum. The idea for the game came to Nelson in 1991 when he was in London pitching for the Enfield Spartans. Along with good friend and owner of the Spartans Malcolm Needs they developed and marketed the game. Distributed by the London Games Company in Europe and Cadaco Toys in North America, for a time it enjoyed the position of being the best selling two player strategy games in both Harrods and Hamleys. The game was awarded a Mensa International Gold Star.

== Rules ==
Bōku belongs to the class of connection games ("n-in-a-row" games) similar to Gomoku or Connect Four. It has two main rules:

- the game is won by putting five marbles into a row
- if a player traps two of the opponent's marbles between two of their own, the player may remove one of the sandwiched marbles (and the opponent may not put a marble back into the same place on the next move).

== World championships ==
The official Boku world championships have been held as part of the Mind Sports Olympiad since 2000 in England. David M. Pearce (England) and Andres Kuusk (Estonia) have been World Champions six times. Martin Hõbemägi (Estonia) has won the title five times.

List of World Champions
Year	World Champion	Country
2000	David Glaude	Belgium
2001	Jan Palmgren	Sweden
2002	Ben Pridmore	England
2003	David M. Pearce	England
2004	David M. Pearce	England
2005	Joey Ho	Hong Kong
2006	David M. Pearce	England
2007	James Heppell	England
2008	David M. Pearce	England
2009	[Did not play]	[Did not play]
2010	David M. Pearce	England
2011	Andres Kuusk	Estonia
2012	Andres Kuusk	Estonia
2013	Andres Kuusk	Estonia
2014	Andres Kuusk	Estonia
2015	Martin Hõbemägi	Estonia
2016	Alain Dekker	South Africa
2017	Martin Hõbemägi	Estonia
2018	Martin Hõbemägi	Estonia
2019	Martin Hõbemägi	Estonia
2020	[Did not play]	[Did not play]
2021	[Did not play]	[Did not play]
2022	Martin Hõbemägi	Estonia
2023	Andres Kuusk	Estonia
2024	David M. Pearce	England
2025	Andres Kuusk	Estonia
