= Khet (game) =

Chess-like abstract strategy board game

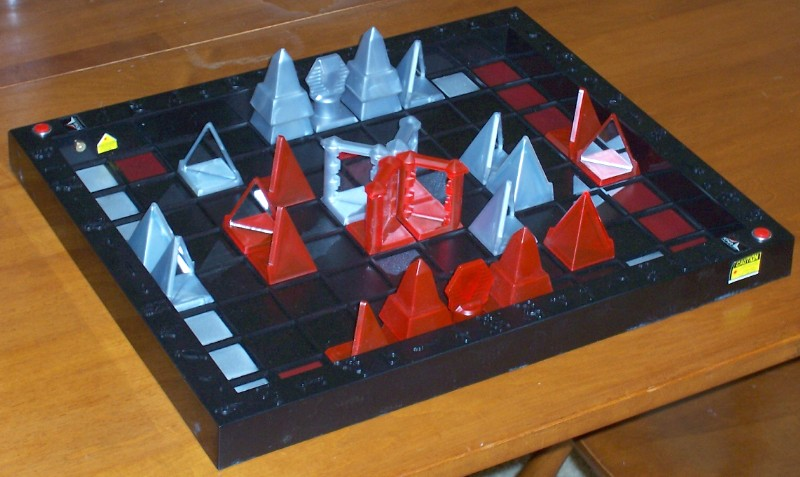
- Khet board with the Classic setup
- Designers: Luke Hooper, Professor Michael Larson, and Del Segura
- Publishers: Innovention Toys, LLC
- Players: 2
- Setup time: 5 minutes
- Playing time: 10-30 minutes
- Chance: None
- Age range: 3 and up
- Skills: Strategy

Khet is a chess-like abstract strategy board game that uses lasers, and was formerly known as Deflexion. Players take turns moving Egyptian-themed pieces around the playing field, firing their low-powered laser diode after each move. Most of the pieces are mirrored on one or more sides, allowing the players to alter the path of the laser through the playing field. When a piece is struck by a laser on a non-mirrored side, it is eliminated from the game.

== History ==
Professor Michael Larson and two students, Del Segura and Luke Hooper, designed the game as a class project at Tulane University. (Professor Larson is now at the University of Colorado.) The game was introduced to the public in the spring of 2005, and was first brought to prominence at the New York Toy Fair of that year. The game was first shipped in October 2005. The first Deflexion World Championship was held December 10, 2005 under the dome at the Massachusetts Institute of Technology. Registration was free, and the participants competed for cash and other prizes. Initially the game was branded as Deflexion, but when confronted with a trademark dispute the creators opted to rebrand and develop an Egyptian theme for the game.

Under the new name, Khet, the first Regional Championship took place in April 2006 at the Café du Monde in the New Orleans French Quarter. Twenty-four participants competed for a number of prizes. As a special bonus, the Eye of Horus beam splitter was unveiled at the very end, and used by each player in the championship game. Khet was also featured on an episode of the HGTV show "I Want That: Tech Toys". Footage from the New Orleans tournament was included in the broadcast.

In 2011 Innovention Toys filed a patent infringement case against MGA, Walmart and Toys "R" Us for producing the game Laser Battle. After Innovention won the case MGA and others appealed the decision where they still lost, but managed to drop the nonobviousness verdict. In 2017 a company called Thinkfun acquired the license for the now out of print Khet 2.0 and rebranded the game "Laser Chess", which kept the same rules, but introduced a sci-fi design.

=== Awards ===
Under its original name, Deflexion, the game was a Mensa Select Award winner. Under the name Khet, the game was one of five finalists for the 2007 Toy of the Year award.

== Gameplay ==
Each player starts the game with 14 playing pieces (12 in Deflexion) on a 10x8 board, arranged in one of several predefined configurations, and a laser. The board has some squares (right file, left corners) that are restricted to pieces of one side or the other, preventing the creation of impenetrable fortress positions. In the original game, the lasers were built into the gameboard; in the "Khet 2.0" version, the lasers are instead built into two extra Sphinx playing pieces, which can be rotated as a player's turn even though they cannot be moved from their starting positions. Scarab (formerly "Djed") and Pyramid pieces have mirrors (one on the Pyramid, and two on the Scarab) positioned such that when the laser beam strikes a reflective side, it reflects at a 90° angle. Players try to position pieces in a fashion that allows the laser beam to reflect into the opponent's Pharaoh, thus winning the game; however, they must also try to protect their own Pharaoh from being struck by the laser beam at the same time. On each turn, a player either moves a piece one square in any direction, or rotates a piece 90 degrees clockwise or counterclockwise. After moving, the player must fire their own laser, and any piece of either color hit on a non-reflecting side (with the exception of Anubis in Khet 2.0 being hit from the front) is removed from play.

The pieces in the game are:

Pharaoh (1 of each color)
The Pharaoh is the most important piece for each side. If hit with a laser, it is destroyed and its owner loses the game. Similar to a king in chess, the Pharaoh pieces are comparatively weak, and so are often not moved unless under duress.
Scarab/Djed (2 of each color)
Scarabs (formerly called Djeds) consist primarily of large, dual-sided mirrors. They reflect a laser coming in from any direction, and thus cannot be eliminated from the board. Also, unlike other pieces, Scarabs may move into an adjacent square even if it is already occupied, by switching places with the piece found there (whichever color it may be). Thus, they are the most powerful pieces on the board, but must be used with care, as a move that puts one side of the mirror in a favorable position may expose the player to attack using the opposite side of the same mirror.
Pyramid (7 of each color)
Pyramids have a single diagonal mirror, and form the primary mechanism for directing the path of the laser. They are vulnerable to a hit from two of the four sides, and must be defended lest the player lose their ability to build paths of any size.
Obelisk (2 in Deflexion, 4 in Khet 1.0, not in Khet 2.0)
Large pillars with no mirrored sides, these are vulnerable to attack from any direction, and therefore useful mostly as an emergency sacrifice to protect another piece (such as the Pharaoh). In Khet 1, each player starts the game with four obelisks each; a laser hit always removes an obelisk.
Anubis (2 in Khet 2.0 only)
Anubis replaced Obelisks in Khet 2.0; they have the advantage that, despite still being unmirrored, they are not affected by a laser strike on the front; they must be hit on the sides or rear in order to be eliminated.
Sphinx (1 of each color)
In Khet 2.0, the Sphinxes hold the lasers. They may not move (each player's is located at their closest right-hand corner) but may be rotated in place so as to fire down the rank instead of the file. A Sphinx is unaffected by laser fire, whether the opponent's or its own reflected back upon itself.

Three opening setups are most commonly used: Classic, which is the standard starting configuration, and is the best setup for one's first time playing; Imhotep, which is a variation on the Classic setup that introduces new defensive possibilities; and Dynasty, which has a fairly even mix of offense and defense, and moves quickly. However, any configuration agreed upon by both players can be used. In Deflexion, half the pieces were gold, and half were silver. When the company changed the name to Khet, the gold pieces were changed to red. In Deflexion, gold always goes first, and in Khet, silver always goes first.

Most new Khet players allow their opponents to "control" the game, and focus on attack or defense depending on the actions of their opponent. However, more experienced players often concentrate on quickly building up a strong defense, and then relentlessly attacking their opponent's pieces, aiming ultimately to reach the Pharaoh. Some take this strategy even farther, and spend almost the entire game focusing on creating an impenetrable defense, simply waiting for their opponent to make a fatal mistake, or to leave themselves open to allow a quick strike at their Pharaoh. As in chess, three-fold repetition of the position is a draw. The average game lasts approximately 10 minutes, however a game between experienced players may take much longer.

== Expansions ==
Two expansions have been released for the game. The Eye of Horus beam splitter expansion adds a new piece that is similar to a Djed, but which splits the beam. When a beam strikes the beam splitter, half bounces off at a right angle, as with the other mirrored pieces, while the other half continues on directly through the mirror, thus creating two beams out of one and adding a new strategic element to the game. Eye of Horus beam splitters are available in gold and silver, for those who own the old Deflexion game, and in red and silver, for those who own the newer Khet game. With the expansion pack, each player receives one beam splitter, which replaces one of their Djeds.

On May 15, 2008 an expansion called "Tower of Kadesh" was released. It adds a 3D element into the game by adding a second level to the game board. The base of the tower has four mirrors that bring the laser up to the top of the tower. In addition to moving a piece horizontally or rotating it, players may move a piece vertically up to or down from the tower, or may move or rotate the tower itself.

In January 2011, a new edition of Khet called "Khet 2.0" was released. Along with updating the appearance of the pieces, The 4 obelisks were replaced with 2 new Anubis pieces, which are able to absorb the beam if hit from the front. The wall surrounding the board was removed, which contained the laser emitter, and the Sphinx piece was introduced which cannot move but can be rotated into one of two positions. The expansions released for Khet 1.0 are not compatible with Khet 2.0, however, "The Eye of Horus 2.0" was also released in 2011.

== Video game versions ==
A multi-player, cross platform iPhone, iPad and Android app was developed for Khet 2.0 by Schogini Systems of India and Innovention Toys. The AI engine for the app was developed by Don Dailey, the creator of the Komodo Chess Engine. This version also seems to have had crossplay with Facebook in some way. The IOS versions of Khet seem to be unavailable in the AppStore for the newer versions as of August 2023.

The Steam version was created by BlueLine Game Studios and has the first digital implementation of the Beam Splitter expansion.

- Khet 2.0 for Windows, Mac, and Linux on Steam with the Beam Splitter expansion as DLC)
- Khet 2.0 for iPhone (crossplay between IOS versions and Android version)
- Khet 2.0 for iPad (crossplay between IOS versions and Android version)
- Khet 2.0 for Android (crossplay with the IOS versions)
- Khet for Second Life
