= Da Vinci's Challenge =

Board game

Da Vinci's Challenge is a board game distributed by Briarpatch.

== Background ==
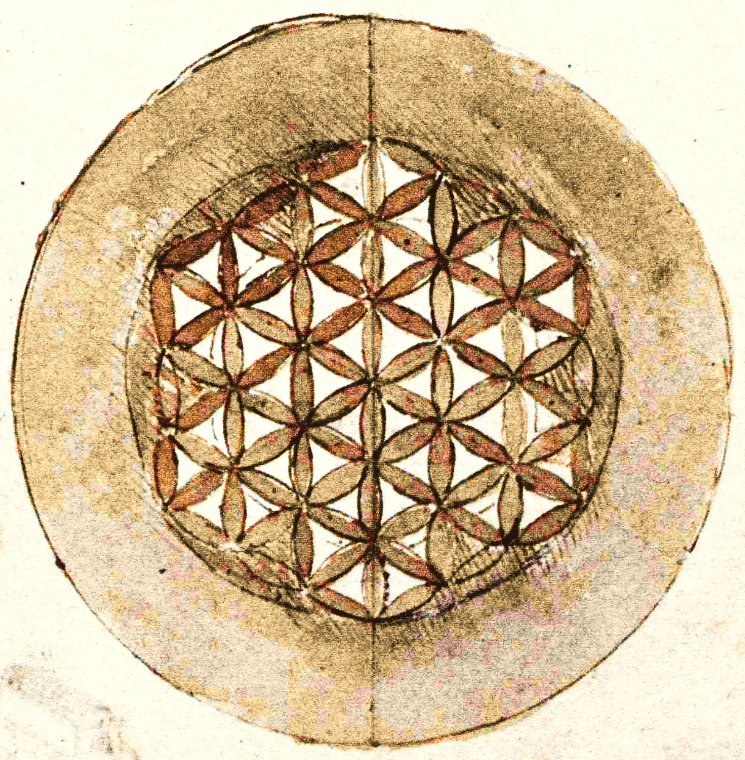
Drawing by Leonardo da Vinci (Codex Atlanticus, fol. 309v, detail)

Da Vinci's Challenge is a game of patterns inspired by a geometric construction drawn by Leonardo da Vinci. The player's objective is to score the most points by using pieces to create patterns worth different point values. This is complicated because patterns can overlap. Pieces can also be used to block the opponent from creating patterns. The game ends when no more patterns can be made by either side. The player with the highest score is the winner.

== Awards ==
It won a 2005 Mensa Select Award.
