= Pirateer =

1978 board game by Scott Peterson

(originally Privateer)
- Manufacturers: Mendocino Game Company
- Designers: Scott Peterson
- Illustrators: Mark Ferrari
- Publication: 1978; 48 years ago as Privateer; 1995; 31 years ago as Pirateer
- Genres: Board game
- Players: 2-4
- Playing time: 15 minutes
- Age range: 8 years or older

Pirateer is a spatial board game for two to four players created by Scott Peterson in 1978. The game was originally named Privateer, before being published by the Mendocino Game Company in 1995. The name of the game is apparently a combination of privateer and pirate.

Pirateer, The Game of Outrageous Fortune, 1997

== Gameplay ==
The objective of the game is for a player to either: return the centrally located treasure to their home port, or to capture all of their opponents' three ships, using movement restricted by dice rolls (two six-sided dice), obstacles, trade winds, and currents.

The theme of the game is for each player to assume the role of a different band of three ships, with their own port and flag.

== Setup ==
Each player chooses a set of pieces with one flag (Skull and Crossbones, Fleur-de-lis, Crescent and Star, or Spanish Cross) and places their ships on the 3 spaces next to the anchor square at their harbor (one square in from the end). The treasure coin is placed on "Skull Island" in the middle of the board.

== Movement ==
Both dice are rolled for movement. Each die equals the number of spaces a ship can be moved in one direction. One ship can be moved twice at right angles, twice in the same direction, or twice in opposite directions. Direct rolls can also be used to move two ships in one direction each. Ships cannot move more than one direction for each die, nor can they cross other ships. Players must use both dice. If movement with both dice is not possible, one die must be used. If no movement is possible, play is forfeited.

There are also "tradewinds". The tradewinds are 20 dark, wavy squares which run the length of the board diagonally on opposite sides of Skull Island. Ships can move diagonally within the tradewinds or, with the lines of the board from the tradewinds. Ships cannot move diagonally from the tradewinds, nor can they jump across the tradewinds with a move from one die.

When a ship takes the treasure, its movement becomes limited. A treasure ship can move directly toward its harbor, or parallel to the length of its harbor. A treasure ship cannot move outward.

== Winning ==
The object of Pirateer is to take the treasure with one of your ships and move it to the anchor square in your harbor, or to capture all opponent ships.

== Strategy ==
The most fundamental skill in any dice game is the comprehension of probability. Though it is impossible to predict exactly how the dice will fall, simple mathematics tells us what is probable. Because of the structure of the board and the probabilities of certain outcomes on two dice, some moves are much better than others. This forms the basis of all strategy.

== Maneuvers ==
Subtractive movement consists in moving one die in the opposite direction from the other. Running is picking up the purse and attempting to bring it home, unmolested. Dogging is the maneuvering behind an opponent who is running with the purse. Note in this case, the ship with the purse can't move backward so you can attack it but it can't strike back. Blocking is moving a ship onto one of the freelanes that lead to an opponent's harbor, impairing movement to and from his harbor. Pearl Harbor is to move a ship into an opponent's harbor with the object of single-handedly capturing their entire fleet.

== Game variants ==
Several official variants for Pirateer have been developed:

=== Devil's Island ===
Instead of starting in the harbor, 2 ships from each player start on the island in the middle of the board.

=== Hurricane ===
Use three dice instead of 2.

=== International ===
On setup, move the middle ship in each harbor clockwise around the board to take up the middle space between the opponents' ships in their harbor.

=== Nuke-a-teer ===
Any time before a player's turn, they may declare any of their ships a "nuke." They then forfeit their movement and roll two dice. The lower of the two dice is the blast radius and everything—including the "nuke"—is destroyed in that area.

=== Hyperspace ===
Movement is allowed on the tradewinds without using the dice. A player must roll onto the tradewinds but once there can move to any space on the tradewinds at will. They can take other pieces but cannot move through them.

=== Flotilla ===
Players start with all 3 ships in the last square of the harbor. Throughout the game, the player can split up the stack or restack their pieces at will—with the proper rolls. If an opponent takes the stack, all the ships in the stack are lost.

=== Other variants ===
Additional official variants include Ransom, Ace-Deuce, Nuke-Iran, Shipwreck, Submarine, Supersonic, and Doomsday Nuke, each with their own unique rule modifications.

== Versions ==
=== Version 1 "Privateer" (1978) ===
"By June of 1978, we had what I consider Version 1 of 'Privateer.' The map was made of white denim that was hemmed at the edges. We used a long narrow corrugated box for packaging with the map rolled up inside. The ships were made of face-grained maple that was hand silk-screened. For the 'purse,' we used brass pieces that were silk-screened and clear-coated. We produced about 100 numbered units in that first run." "…we did a second printing of about 200 units with some minor refinements, but it was essentially the same game."

=== Version 2 "Privateer" (1980) ===
"Version 2 of 'Privateer' came out in 1980. We made some significant production upgrades. The box was made of 'chip' cardboard -- a thin cardboard -- that was lithographically printed and UV coated. The map was made of off-white canvas duck that wasn't hemmed - we produced about 3,000 of those. Later we switched to a synthetic pellon material for the map and made about 5,000 of those. The ships were end-grained birch - the early versions had three colors, but later we simplified to two colors. For the purse, we used slightly domed brass pieces and produced about 3,000 of them. Overall, we made around 8,000 units of Version 2."

=== Pirateer (1995) ===
"The box was a 'bookcase' size -- quite common now but unusual in 1995 -- and it featured a standing male figure with his foot on a treasure chest. It had a quarter-fold cardboard map that fit the bookcase style better than the cloth map would have. The ships were made of plastic with stickers - we produced about 10,000 of those. In 1996, we upgraded to solid plastic ships and made close to 80,000 units of that second version. The purse was now stamped brass with gold plating." Note that this version has a box featuring ships in combat.

=== Twentieth Anniversary Edition (1997) ===
"Released in 1997, the Twentieth Anniversary Edition featured a long skinny metal box, a cloth map, and plastic pieces. It also included a doubling cube, similar to backgammon."

== Publication history ==
"First Edition Graphic Arts Studios," in Sacramento, California produced the initial versions of the game when it was known as Privateer in 1978 and 1980.

The Mendocino Game Company, based in Mendocino County, California, began publishing Pirateer in 1995. The company produced the game until 2002, when production ceased following legal disputes among the company's principals.

== Reception ==
Forrest Johnson reviewed the original 1978 version of Privateer in The Space Gamer magazine, no. 39. He commented on the game by saying, "Simple, but not dull, Privateer takes almost no thought at all. A good game to bring out after the bottle has gone around a couple of times."

According to Richard Berg's 1981 review, "Privateer is, basically, a second cousin of checkers, ...perhaps twice removed. But if it's checkers, it's checkers with a bit of class. And the class is in the physical production. The playing surface is a full-color cloth (perhaps some type of linen or canvas) that is quite attractive, and the playing pieces are nicely designed, polished wooden discs, each painted with a distinctive symbol."

The Gorget & Sash Journal of the Early Modern Warfare Society review said: "Privateer is labeled 'the game of outrageous fortune,' and indeed it is. Simulating a rather fast-paced search for the treasure, it accommodates two to four players and is suitable for a gamers of all ages, including precocious six-year-olds! In a dozen or so games your editors lost consistently and indecorously to their progeny, aged between six and twelve. This game can be learned quickly and plays in a matter of minutes. It is simple but fun, and children will enjoy it especially, whether beating their elders or amusing themselves on a rainy afternoon. Privateer comes boxed in an attractive cardboard carton and stores easily. Each game comes with a full color cloth chart, 12 silkscreened wooden token representing ships, a brass treasure token, dice, instructions on rules and strategy, and a 'letter of marque.' If you'd like to play a boardgame but don't want to get to serious, you'll like Privateer."

In Campaign Magazine Mel Willoughby wrote of Privateer, "First, the game's simplicity and purity will allow it to find a place in the heart of the entire family - yes, even wargame widows. And second, the game can be played without boredom over and over and over and over again, for it truly is 'the game of outrageous fortune'."

Privateer was included in the 1985 Games 100: "Wooden pieces and a cloth board enhance this fast-paced game of fortune on the high seas. Each player has three ships which move according to dice throws. The object is to take a treasure from a central island-or from a ship that has already grabbed it and bring it back to your home harbor. Or win by eliminating all enemy ships. Expect most games to have a tense, exciting finish."

In 1996, Pirateer was one of just five board games to win the Mensa Select award. It was also named "Game of the Year" by John Kovalic of the Wisconsin State Journal, while film critic Mick LaSalle of the San Francisco Chronicle called it "addictive" and Phil Bettel of the Chicago Tribune gave high marks to the instructions.
