= Dao (game) =

Abstract strategy board game

Dao is a two-player abstract strategy board game, which won the Mensa Select award in 2001. It was invented in 1999 by Ben van Bushkirk and Jeff Pickering.

It comprises a 4x4 playing board with four playing pieces for each player. The aim of the game is to arrange pieces in certain winning formations before the opponent can. It is unique because any piece that is moving must move as far as it can.

There are four different ways to win the game: by forming a 2x2 square with your four pieces, by forming a straight vertical or horizontal line with your four pieces, by placing your four pieces in all four corners, or by having one of your pieces cornered by three of the opponents pieces.
