= The Answer Man =

American radio program (1937–1956)

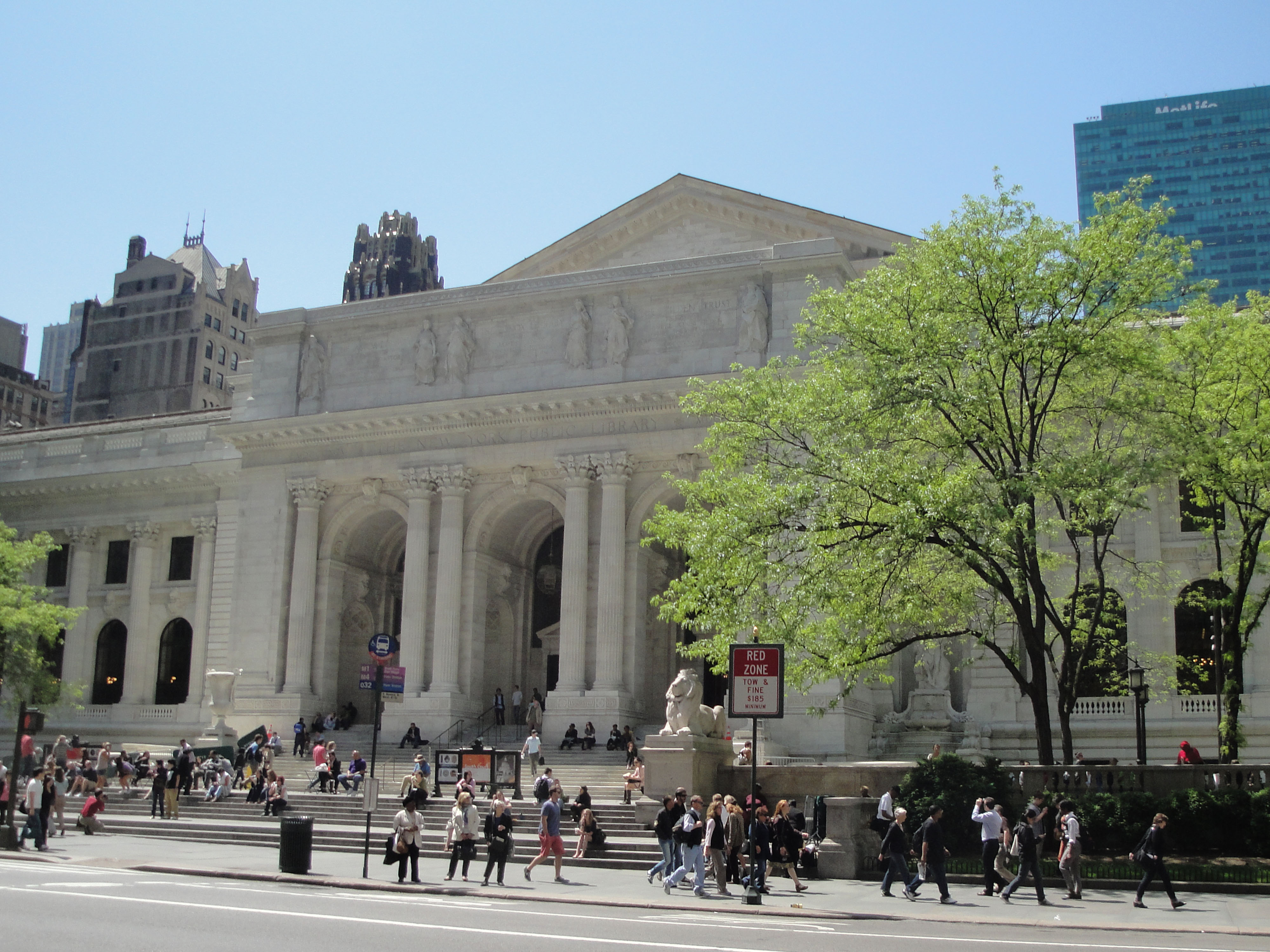
The offices of The Answer Man were across the street from the New York Public Library, a source for many of the answers.

The Answer Man is a United States 15-minute radio program that aired from 1937 to 1956 on the Mutual Broadcasting System and also in syndication. It was broadcast late Sunday evening on some stations. During the 1940s, the program was sponsored by Trommer's White Label Beer. The Answer Man was Albert Carlyle Mitchell, who was born May 31, 1893, in Elsberry, Missouri. The series was created by Mitchell and Bruce Chapman.

Questions submitted by listeners were answered on the air by Mitchell, and those who sent questions not used in the program were given answers by mail. The program's offices were located across the street from the New York Public Library, which helps to explain how Chapman and his staff (along with 40 helpers) were able to deal with a constant flow of nearly a million questions a year. They also kept their own specialized library of several thousands of volumes, and they created a card index of 20,000 authorities who could be consulted when all research avenues failed. The show was carefully scripted, yet it created the illusion that Mitchell was answering spontaneously. Many listeners believed that he was a genius with total recall of all information.

Mitchell would often close an episode with a short poem that was relevant to a previous question and which provided a thoughtful and tranquil conclusion for the listener.

== Q&A ==
On New York's WOR, the program was heard twice a day from 1937 to 1952. Questions and answers covered every conceivable topic, from stain removal to legal advice. Typical questions:

- How tall was Jesus?
- What makes bubble gum bubble?
- Is it true that only the male cricket chirps?

According to an article printed in the 1940s, there were two questions that the Answer Man was unable to answer:

- How many buffalo would it take to fill Grand Canyon?
- Do birds dream?

The series was sometimes developed for individual markets, such as local versions in France, Germany, Greece, Holland and Poland, with Radio Luxembourg also broadcasting the concept in Europe. In Los Angeles, Joe Mansfield was the Answer Man.

The spin-off quiz book, Here's the Answer by Albert Mitchell, was published by Miles-Emmett in 1946. Distributed by Dodd, Mead & Company, this book featured more than 2000 questions and answers, grouped by subject.

Mitchell died October 4, 1954

== Satires ==
The series was satirized on television by Ernie Kovacs and Steve Allen. The Kovacs lampoon was a feature titled The Question Man. In Steve Allen's parody, the answers were given first, followed by the question: A: "Rank and file." Q: "What does it take to get out of an Army prison?"

== See also ==
- Imponderables

== Listen to ==
- Glowing Dial: The Answer Man (November 23, 1944)
