= Golf (card game) =

Type of card game

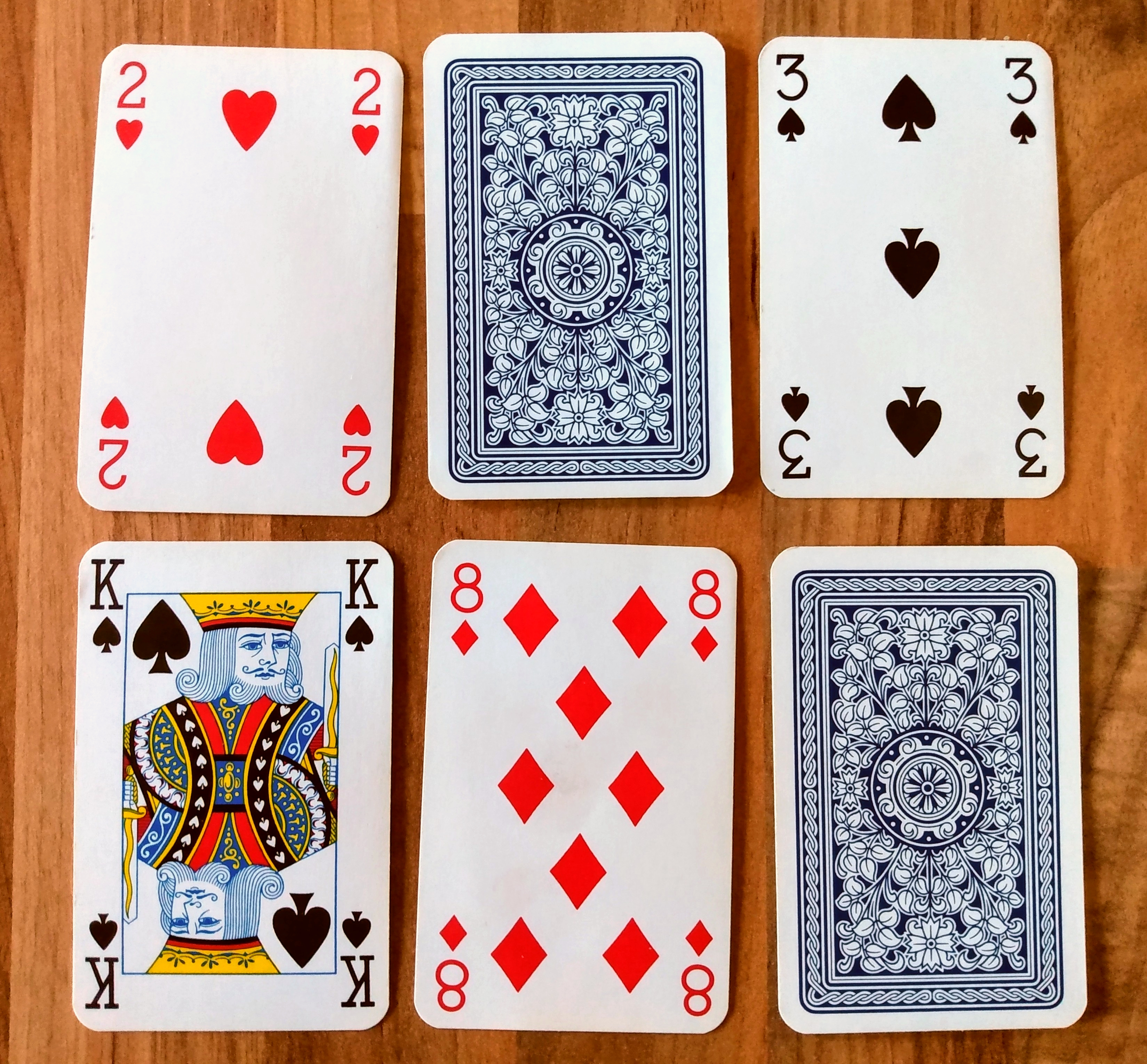
- A player's grid of cards, in six card golf
- Alternative names: Polish Polka, Polish Poker, Turtle
- Type: Draw and discard
- Players: 2+
- Cards: Single deck of 52 or double deck of 104
- Deck: Anglo-American
- Playing time: 10 minutes

Golf (also known as Polish Polka, Polish Poker, Turtle, Hara Kiri and Crazy Nines) is a card game where players try to earn the lowest score (as in golf, the sport) over the course of multiple deals (or "holes", as in a golf course hole), usually nine.

This game is not to be confused with the solitaire game of the same name, with which it has little in common.

== Deal ==
A single 52-card deck is recommended for a two or three player game. If played with four or more players, a double-deck of 104 cards is ideal.

Each player is dealt six face-down cards from a shuffled deck. The remaining cards are placed face down to form the stockpile, from which the top card is taken and turned up to start the discard pile beside it. Players arrange their cards in two rows of three in front of them and turn any two of these cards face up. This arrangement is maintained throughout the game; players always have six cards in front of them.

== Play ==
The objective is for players to reduce the value of the cards in front of them by swapping them for lesser value cards. After the end of each round, players calculate the score of their respective six cards.

Beginning with the person left of the dealer, each player takes turn doing one of three actions:

1. Draw a card from the discard pile and replace it with any of the player's six cards facing up, regardless if the card replaced is facing up or facing down. (Players must perform the swap if the card is drawn from the discard pile) The card that was replaced is then discarded (facing up).
2. Draw a card from the stockpile and replace it with any of the player's six cards facing up (when the card drawn is desirable), regardless if the card replaced is facing up or facing down. The card that was replaced is then discarded (facing up).
3. Draw a card from the stockpile and discard the drawn card (when the card is not desirable). It is optional that one of the cards faced down in the player's formation must be revealed (flipped face up) depending on the variation.

If the card is drawn from the stockpile, the player who drew the card is allowed to inspect their card in order to make a decision.

The round ends when a player has six face-up cards (sometimes the other players are given one final turn following this), after which scoring happens as follows:

- Each Ace scores one point
- Each Two scores minus two points
- Each numeral card from 3 to 10 scores its face value
- Each Jack or Queen scores 10 points
- Each King scores zero points
- A pair of equal-ranked cards in the same column scores zero points for that column regardless of the rank of those cards

During play, it is not legal to return a card drawn from the discard pile without playing it. When a player picks up the top card of the discard pile, that card must be played by swapping it with one of that player's cards.

A full game is typically nine hands, also known as "holes", after which the player with the fewest points total is designated the winner. A longer game can be played to eighteen hands.

== Variations ==
There are many variants of multiplayer golf. Some common ones include:

=== Single-deck golf ===
For two to four players. Rules are the same as in double-deck golf. Sometimes, jokers are not used.

=== Knocking ===
Golf can be played so that instead of ending the game automatically, a player must choose to "knock" instead of taking their turn. Remaining players then have one turn to draw a card to improve their hands and then scores are totaled and recorded on a running score sheet. This rule is more common for four-card golf.

=== Four-card golf ===
Suitable for 3–7 players, in four-card Golf each player receives four cards face down in a 2×2 grid and reveal two before play begins. Play proceeds similar to six-card golf. The end of a round is initiated by a player 'knocking', after which other players get one final turn.

=== Nine-card golf ===
One or two decks are involved, depending on the number of players. One deck is adequate for 1-3 players, two or more decks are suggested for 4+ players. To begin the game, each player is dealt nine cards, laying out the cards face down in a 3x3 grid. The method or pattern for how the players layout their 3x3 grid is arbitrary, as long as the cards remain face down.

The game is played as six-card golf. Once any grid contains only face-up cards, the game is immediately ended, there are no further turns, and all players must flip all their face-down cards to determine their scores. Scoring is the same as six-card golf, with players having to form a full three-of-a-kind column to have that column score zero.

This process of game play continues for nine total games or until a player exceeds 50 points.

Optional rules of this version include:

- Horizontal and diagonal lines of three also score zero
- Playing with jokers in the game, valued at -2 points, and having 2s score +2 instead of -2
- Every pair of adjacent (horizontal or vertical) equal cards scores zero
- If the player places four cards in a square pattern (i.e. 2x2 block) of the same face-point value, this results in a negative score (e.g. -25), for those four cards
- Instead of drawing a card, a player may choose to flip a card in their grid face up
- Playing until a player exceeds 100 points instead of 50

=== Alternative scoring ===
There are many variants for point values of cards, including:

- Jokers are added to the deck and score -5, or some other negative number.
- Jokers are +15 individually, or -5 as a pair.
- Queens score 12, 13 or 20 points each.
- Queen of spades scores 40 points, other Queens 10 each, and Eights zero points.
- One-eyed jacks are wild and automatically form a pair with an adjacent card (or complete a triplet in 9-card golf).
- Jacks score zero, Queens 12, Kings 13.
- Jacks are worth 20 points each and, when discarded, the next player in turn order loses a turn.
- Twos are plus 2 instead of minus 2 (usually played in games without jokers).
- Four of a kind wins the game (not the hole) automatically (usually played in 4-card golf).
- A player who has a 9 card straight scores -12. This hand is considered a "hole in 1". If a player does not obtain correct number of cards for a straight, all points are added as usual.
- A player may "shoot the moon" by getting the maximum 60 points. When this occurs, all other players get 60 points.
- When playing 8-card, 4x2, four kings on one side = -16 points.
- In "Cutthroat Golf", the kings are worth 15 points and, if drawn from the deck, can be traded for any other player's up card. The card they receive must then be placed in their hand.

In some versions, making a pair or triple of cards of equal rank (sometimes vertically, sometimes horizontally and sometimes diagonally) reduces those cards' scores to zero.

=== Cambio ===
Variants known as Cambio, Pablo or Cactus include "power cards". When a power card is drawn from the stock, it can either be used for its normal value or discarded to activate its power. (If a power card is drawn from the discards, it must be played as its number.) A simple version of the game played in Malaysia has the following power cards:

- A Jack allows a player to look at one of their own cards (without their opponent seeing it)
- A Queen allows a player to look at one of their opponent's cards (again without their opponent seeing)
- A King allows a player to swap one of their own cards with that of their opponent
- A Joker allows a player to change the positions of their opponent's cards

John McLeod of Pagat.com speculates that these variants are Spanish in origin, as the game is recorded as being played by students in Spain, and many of its variant names are Spanish words (cambio meaning "exchange"). The game had a commercial release as Cabo in 2010 and is similar to the 1996 Mensa Select winner Rat-a-Tat Cat.

=== Knocker's penalties and bonuses ===
Some play Golf and its variations such that a player who knocks (turns over all cards first) but doesn't end with the lowest score is penalized:

- Knocker adds a penalty of 10 or 20 points, or...
- Knocker's score for the hand is doubled with 5 points added, or...
- The knocker takes a score equal to the highest scoring player for that hand, or...
- Knocker adds twice the number of people playing.

If the knocker's score is lowest, some play with a bonus:

- Knocker scores zero instead of a positive score, or...
- Knocker's score is reduced by the number of people playing.
