= Pixel (board game) =

Strategy board game

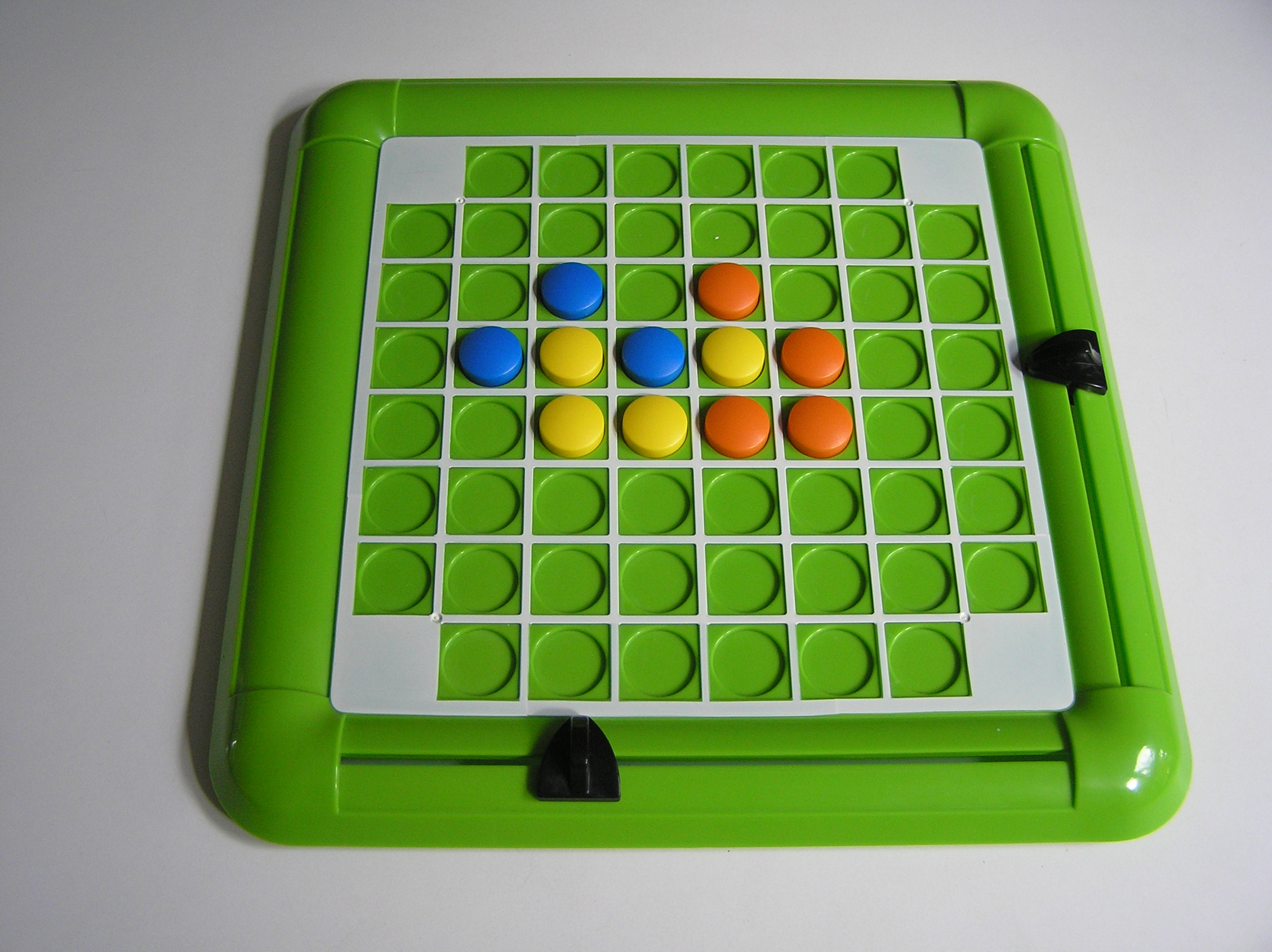

Pixel is an abstract strategy game for two to four players. It is played on an 8-by-8 grid of spaces with the four corner spaces removed. It uses horizontal and vertical sliders. In a 2 or 3-player pixel game, the player who succeeds in placing four of their stones in a horizontal, vertical, or diagonal row wins the game. If nobody succeeds, the player who makes the most lines of three of their stones in a horizontal, vertical, or diagonal row wins the game.

The first stones go in the center of the board. Each player places one stone. The two sliders originally point to the first player's stone. Each player then moves one slide and places one of his stones on to the intersection. In a 4-player pixel game, the player who succeeds in placing three of their stones in a horizontal, vertical, or diagonal row wins the game. If nobody succeeds, the player who makes the most lines of two of their stones in a horizontal, vertical, or diagonal row wins the game.

The game won the 2008 Mensa Select award.
