= Late for the Sky Production Company =

Game publisher

- Industry: Games
- Founded: 1984
- Headquarters: Cincinnati, Ohio, US
- Products: Custom Board Games
- Services: Custom Board Games
- Website: lateforthesky.com

Late for the Sky Production Company is a U.S.-based board game production and manufacturing company based in Cincinnati, Ohio, founded in 1984. They manufacture games based on Monopoly.

== History ==
Late for the Sky Production Company was started in 1984 by a Miami University of Ohio student who started to create a Miami University campus version of Monopoly. The company then focused on expanding its products by keeping to college-themed versions. Later it expanded its product line to other themes.

== Game line ==
The company's major product lines include "-opoly" games for nearly sixty major colleges and universities in the United States, and the "City in a Box" games, localized for major U.S. cities. They also have a line of specialty games, and produce custom games for other themes.

Late For The Sky also manufactures custom "-opoly" games for communities and businesses. These games include custom images on the box, board, cards, and money, along with tokens chosen by the customer.

=== Example themes ===
- America-in-a-box
- Cat-Opoly
- Dino-Opoly
- DIY-Opoly
- Ocean-Opoly
- Whoville-Opoly
- Wild Animal-Opoly
- Zombie-Opoly

==== Dog Breeds Line ====
- Dog-Opoly
  - Chihuahua-opoly
  - Pug-Opoly
  - Dachshund-opoly

==== City Line ====
- Albuquerque-opoly
- Boston-opoly
- Buffalo-opoly
- Chattanooga-opoly
- "Chicago-in-a-box" - 1st Chicago Edition
- "Chicago-opoly" (2009) - 2nd Chicago Edition
- Chilliwack-opoly
- Cleveland-opoly
- Grants Pass-opoly
- Las Vegas-opoly
- Medford-opoly
- Nashville-opoly
- New Orleans-opoly
- Newport News-opoly
- Omaha-opoly
- Portland-opoly
- Round Rock-opoly
- Stephenville-opoly
- Victorville-opoly
- Wichita-opoly

==== Special Topics ====
  - Bacon-opoly
  - Bible-opoly
  - Brew-opoly
  - Fantasy-opoly
  - Fishin'-opoly
  - Geek-opoly
  - Wine-opoly

==== Universities ====
  - Auburn-opoly (Auburn University)
  - Bama-opoly (University of Alabama)
  - Beaver-opoly (Oregon State University)
  - Buck-opoly (Ohio State University)
  - Hog-opoly (University of Arkansas)
  - Husker-opoly (University of Nebraska–Lincoln)
  - Iowa-opoly (University of Iowa)
  - Miami-opoly (Miami University of Ohio)
  - MSU-opoly (Mississippi State University)
  - Purdue-opoly (Purdue University)
  - Spartan-opoly (Michigan State University)
  - Virginia Tech-opoly (Virginia Tech)

== Differences from Monopoly ==
There are a few product line-wide deviations from a standard Monopoly board that make Late For the Sky's games discrete. Aesthetically, this includes replacing the standard color scheme of property sets with a rainbow scheme (with Red being the lowest value, and pink being the highest), and renaming all properties and tiles, including those not normally re-themed in officially licensed variations and localizations of Monopoly such as the "Chance" tiles (usually renamed "Contingency") the "Go to Jail" tile (often renamed "Go Home"). Besides these aesthetic changes, the board layout is essentially identical to Monopoly except that the final "Contingency" ("Chance") space is swapped with the second to last property, separating the properties in the final color group by two spaces instead of one.
