= Spy Alley =

- Designers: William Stephenson
- Years active: 1992
- Genres: Board game
- Players: 2-6 (best 4)
- Playing time: 45 minutes

Spy Alley is a board game wherein each player secretly works for the spy agency of one of six countries. The players take turns moving around the board in an attempt to first gather the password, disguise, code book, and key corresponding to their country, and then reach their embassy, winning the game. But the player must beware, for any of one's opponents may deduce and expose one's nationality at any time, thus eliminating one from the game. This game has won several awards including: Family Life’s “Best Learning Toys of 1988”, MENSA Select Award, Parent’s Choice Award, and Games Magazine Top 100.

== How to play ==
To determine in which order the players take their turn, each player must roll the die and whoever rolls the highest starts the game. To start, roll the die and move your token that many times, going the direction of the arrow on the start place. The other players take their turns clockwise. Each player sets out to collect their own password, disguise, code book, and key of their country without having any other player recognize their identity. To collect these items, players must land on the appropriate spaces. Once a player has collected all their appropriate items, they must land on their own embassy space to win.
