= Imponderables (book series) =

- Author: Dave Feldman
- Country: United States
- Language: English
- Genre: Reference; FAQ
- Publisher: HarperCollins (1986–1993; 2004–2006); Penguin (1995–96)
- Published: 1986–2006
- Media type: Print
- No. of books: 11
- Website: imponderables.com

Imponderables, or Mysteries of Everyday Life Explained, is a series of illustrated reference books by David Feldman written in FAQ format. The series was published by imprints of HarperCollins from 1986 to 1993, Penguin from 1995 to 1996, and HarperCollins from 2004 to 2006.

== Premise ==
The books examine, investigate, and explain common, yet puzzling phenomena. Examples include: "Why do your eyes hurt when you are tired?", "Why do judges wear black robes?", and "Why do you rarely see purple Christmas lights?", among many others. The word "imponderable" is used to describe such mysteries of everyday life. The books are organized in a FAQ format.

Additional chapters explore Frustables, defined as Imponderables that are uniquely frustrating because they lack a clear answer. Some of the recurring Frustables are:

- Why do you so often see one shoe lying along the side of the road?
- Why do the English drive on the left and most other countries on the right?
- Why do American women shave their armpits?
- Why do doctors have such messy handwriting?

== Volumes ==
Not all volumes include a number stamp. HarperCollins assigned each edition more than one ISBN, therefore the numbers listed below may not be the first edition.

No.	Title	Publisher	Date	ISBN
1	Imponderables (Note: Revised as Why Don't Cats Like to Swim? (2004).)	HarperCollins	September 1986	0-688-05913-9
2	Why Do Clocks Run Clockwise?	HarperCollins	November 1987	0-06-015781-X
3	When Do Fish Sleep?	HarperCollins	October 1989	0-06-016161-2
4	Why Do Dogs Have Wet Noses?	HarperCollins	September 1990	0-06-016293-7
5	Do Penguins Have Knees?	HarperCollins	October 1991	0-06-016294-5
6	When Did Wild Poodles Roam the Earth? (Note: Revised as Are Lobsters Ambidextrous? (2005).)	HarperCollins	November 1992	0-06-016908-7
7	How Does Aspirin Find a Headache?	HarperCollins	November 1993	0-06-016923-0
8	What Are Hyenas Laughing At, Anyway?	Penguin	October 1995	0-399-14084-0
9	How Do Astronauts Scratch an Itch?	Penguin	October 1996	0-399-14189-8
10	Do Elephants Jump?	HarperCollins	November 2, 2004	0-06-053913-5
11	Why Do Pirates Love Parrots?	HarperCollins	September 2006	0-06-088842-3

=== Revised volumes ===
Feldman significantly revised two volumes for HarperCollins in 2004. They were released alongside reprints of other volumes with new titles.

No.	Title	Date	ISBN
1	Why Don't Cats Like to Swim?	November 2, 2004	0-06-075148-7
6	Are Lobsters Ambidextrous?	August 16, 2005	0-06-076295-0

=== Who Put the Butter in Butterfly? ===
In 1989, Feldman explored a number of idiosyncratic features of the English language in Who Put the Butter in Butterfly?. The volume was not published as part of the Imponderables series by HarperCollins, however the book design and text formatting of paperback editions is identical to other volumes.

Title	Date	ISBN
Who Put the Butter in Butterfly?	April 1989	0-06-016072-1

== See also ==
- The Answer Man – Radio program that ran from 1937 to 1956
- "The Straight Dope" – Newspaper column and companion books published from 1973 to 2018
