= Terrace (board game) =

The Future of Strategy Games
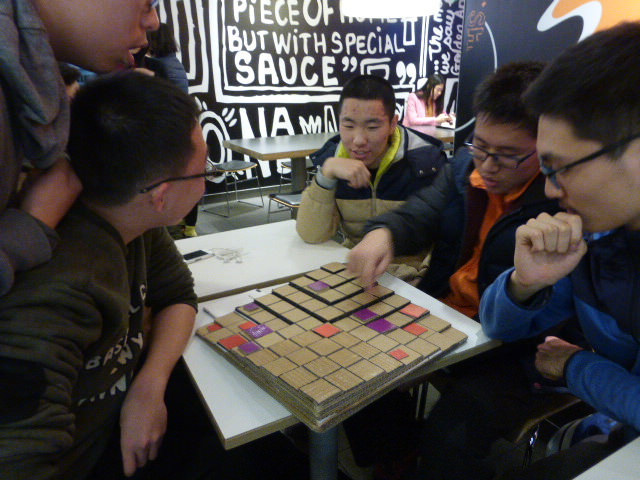
- Chinese high school students play Terrace on a homemade board in Yantai
- Manufacturers: Herbko International
- Designers: Anton Dresden, Buzz Siler
- Publishers: Siler/Siler Ventures
- Publication: 1991
- Genres: Abstract strategy board game
- Players: 2-4
- Playing time: 30-120 minutes
- Publishers: Buzz and Sandi Siler

Terrace is a strategy game played by two, three, or four players on a multi-leveled 8×8 (or, more recently, 6×6) board. It is most widely known for also being a prop in the American television series Star Trek: The Next Generation. There are also computer versions of the game. The object of the game is to capture the opponent's 'T' piece, or to move one's own 'T' piece to the lowest square on the opposite side of the board.

== Rules ==
The game board for Terrace has either 64 or 36 squares of uniform color, arranged in L-shaped levels ("terraces") that rise stepwise from the board's lowest points in two diagonally opposite corners to its highest points in the other two corners. All pieces are shaped alike and move according to the same rules, but they are of four different sizes and vary in capturing "power." One of each player's smallest pieces has the letter "T" carved into it and has a role somewhat similar to the king in chess.

The object is to win either by moving your "T" piece from its starting point at one corner to an opposite corner, or by capturing your opponent's "T". Players can move any number of squares on the same terrace, and are allowed to jump over their own pieces. Players can move up a terrace by either going straight up or diagonally up. Players can move down a terrace by going straight down. Opponent's pieces, and even one's own pieces, may be captured by moving diagonally down. Pieces may only capture those of equal or lesser size. It is courteous to say 'Terrace' when the opponent's "T" piece is placed in jeopardy of being caught the next turn; "Terrace-Mate" should be said when the opponent's "T" piece cannot escape. In 3 and 4 player games, when a player loses their "T", all of their pieces are removed from the board; other players continue the game. If a player cannot make a move during their turn, the game is a draw, with no winner or loser.

== History ==
The original 8×8 game of Terrace was invented in 1950 by Dutch-born Anton Dresden (September 8, 1915 - July 3, 2006), with rules that "proved unworkable"; in 1988, while living in Lake Oswego, Oregon, Dresden showed his game to Buzz Siler, who bought the rights to Dresden's design for $100 and, over time, created a simplified set of rules. After the game was introduced in 1991, Terrace won a number of major awards and was subsequently featured on Star Trek: The Next Generation as a permanent prop.

In 1997, a revised version was introduced, with the board changed to 36 squares, with 12 pieces per player instead of 16. Two rows separate the two players' pieces, instead of four. The change came about because of legal problems with the owners of the molds to the original version of the game.

Tom Hawkins proposed a variant with different capturing rules which makes the game more strategically complex.

== Reviews ==
- Games #108
- 1992 Games 100 in Games #112

== Awards ==
- Best New Abstract Strategy Game (Games magazine, 1992)
- Best New Mind Game (Mensa International)
- Bronze, Industrial Design Excellence Award (Industrial Designers Society of America, 1992)
