= Malarky =

Trivia game that incorporates bluffing

- The Malarky logo and game board
- Designers: David Feldman
- Publishers: Patch Products
- Players: 3-6 or teams
- Playing time: Approximately 45 minutes
- Skills: Bluffing

Malarky is a trivia game that incorporates bluffing into the gameplay. It was developed by Rocco "Ernie" Capobianco, a Dallas advertising executive, and David Feldman, the maker of the Imponderables novels, and published by Patch Products in 1997.

== Awards ==
Awards won by this bluffing game/board game include:

- Number 1 Game of the Year (Good Housekeeping, September 1997)
- Buyer's Guide to Games (Games Magazine, 1998)
- Zillions Magazine, Consumer Reports for Kids (March/April 1998)
- National Association for Gifted Children Holiday Educational Toy List (1998)
- The FamilyFun Kid Test Toy of the Year Award Finalist (1998)
- LifeWorks' Real Life Award (1999)
