= MindTrap =

Series of lateral thinking board games

MindTrap is a series of lateral thinking puzzle games played by two individuals or teams. Invented in Canada, it is the main product of MindTrap Games, Inc., who license the game for manufacture by various companies including Outset Media, Blue Opal, the Great American Puzzle Factory, Pressman Toy Corporation, Spears Games and Winning Moves.

Players are given a puzzle from a card and a limited amount of time to solve it. Each correct answer advances the player or team along a track printed on the scorecard; they win by being the first to reach the end.

The original game contained only logic and lateral thinking puzzles, while later editions added other types of brain teasers including tangrams and stick puzzles. Lateral thinking problems are identified by a diamond on the question side of the card, indicating that answering team are allowed to ask "yes/no" questions about the puzzle scenario. These puzzles often give unnecessary information in order to distract the answerer from a simple, common sense solution, and play on common assumptions. Some questions play on words or pictures and some on everyday trivia.

Many scenarios and characters reoccur throughout the puzzles, including murders and other crimes investigated by "Detective Shadow" (and perpetrated by villains including "Sid Shady" and "Sam Sham"), and tricks performed by magician "Dee Septor".

The questions are worded in Canadian-English, with Canadian terminology and spelling, and are not localized for the American, UK or Australian markets.

== Releases and Distributors ==
MindTrap was originally released as a board game in carton packaging with over 500 puzzles printed on cards and a playing board (printed on paper) by Pressman Toy Corporation in Canada and the US in 1991, by Blue Opal in Australia and by Spears Games in the UK. Translated versions of the original game have been released in French, German and Italian. Tin packaged versions of the game were released by Paul Lamond in the UK, and later by Pressman Toy Corporation and the Great American Puzzle Factory as tenth anniversary editions.

In 1994, MindTrap Games, Inc. and Pirate Radio released MindTrap -- New Audio Mystery Edition on cassette tapes featuring over 2 hours of mysteries along with an answer book. This double cassette edition lacks the playing board and cards.

A sequel to MindTrap, originally titled MindTrap - The Challenge Continues was released in 1997 by MindTrap Games, Inc. and Pressman Toy Corporation. The Roman numeral "II" was later added to this title. European released translations of the sequel include Greek, Portuguese and Spanish. In 2001 Ultimate MindTrap, the official sequel to MindTrap II, was released in the UK.

Outset Media, a Canadian-based manufacturer and distributor of games and puzzles, licensed MindTrap in 2007 and has since released MindTrap games in different forms. Outlet Media releases of the board game include a tin-packaged MindTrap: Classic Edition, a 20th Anniversary Edition, and a French translated version of the game, which, akin to the English versions of the game, uses Canadian-French terminology and wording in favour of any localization. In 2007, a travel pack of games called Geometrical Riddles was created by Outlet Media. The game includes three levels of difficulty: Novice, Master, and Genius. Each assortment contains 54 cards with recognition problems, geometrical and mathematical puzzles. Newer MindTrap card games were released in 2011 called Left Brain Right Brain, Brain Cramp, and Shadow Mysteries.

Pressman Toy Corporation released a series of 500 piece, 24" x 18", "mystery" jigsaw puzzles, each provided with a booklet of an original short mystery story. Readers assemble the puzzle to discover clues to match wits against Detective Shadow in a race to solve the crime.

== List of MindTrap Games ==
Board games:

- MindTrap (1991) - the original game, consisting only of logic and lateral thinking puzzles.
- MindTrap II - The Challenge Continues (1997) - a sequel introducing additional puzzle types (picture, stick and shape puzzles).
- Ultimate MindTrap (2001) - another sequel, with new puzzles in the various types introduced in MindTrap II.
- MindTrap - The Revised Edition (2007) - a new edition comprising puzzles from MindTrap and MindTrap II.
- MindTrap - Classic Edition (2007) - 486 of the best puzzles, mysteries, conundrums and trick questions from MindTrap.

Anniversary editions:

- MindTrap 10th Anniversary Edition (2001) - same as the original game but comes in a 10th Anniversary Edition tin.
- MindTrap 20th Anniversary Edition (2011) - does away with the playing board but adds two new categories to those available in MindTrap II.

Translated releases:

- MindTrap French (2006) - the original game, translated into French and distributed by Outset Media.
- MindTrap (1991) - German (Schmidt Spiele), Italian (Giochi Spear).
- MindTrap II - Greek (Spear's Games), Portuguese (Mattel Games), Spanish (Juegos Spear).

Audio editions:

- MindTrap - All New Audio Mystery Edition (1994) - double cassette of over 2 hours, including new mysteries (to the original).

Card games:

- MindTrap Geometrical Riddles: Novice Level (2007) -- for ages 10 and up.
- MindTrap Geometrical Riddles: Master Level (2007) -- for ages 12 and up.
- MindTrap Geometrical Riddles: Genius Level (2007) -- for ages 14 and up.
- MindTrap: Brain Cramp (2011) - for ages 10 and up.
- MindTrap: Shadow Mysteries (2011) - for ages 12 and up. Includes detective scenarios from MindTrap's infamous characters "Detective Shadow", "Sid Shady" and "Sam Sham".
- MindTrap: Left Brain Right Brain (2001) - for ages 14 and up.

Jigsaw puzzles:

- MindTrap - Murder By Will
- MindTrap - Murder's in Fashion
- MindTrap - An Unsavoury Demise
- MindTrap - Revenge in Paradise

Books:

- Tricky MindTrap Puzzles: Challenge the Way You Think & See (2000)
- Lateral MindTrap Puzzles: Challenge the Way You Think & See (2000)
