= Qwirkle =

Tile-based board game

- The Qwirkle game box
- Publishers: Mindware (Division of OTC Subsidiary of Berkshire Hathaway)
- Publication: 2006; 20 years ago
- Genres: Abstract, family, Tile-laying
- Players: 2–4 players
- Setup time: 1 minute
- Playing time: 30–45 minutes
- Chance: Moderate
- Age range: 6+
- Skills: Strategy, logic

Qwirkle is a tile-based game for two to four players, designed by Susan McKinley Ross and published by MindWare in 2006. Qwirkle shares some characteristics with the games Rummikub and Scrabble. It is distributed in Canada by game and puzzle company Outset Media. Qwirkle is considered by MindWare to be its most awarded game of all time. In 2011, Qwirkle won the Spiel des Jahres. A sequel, Qwirkle Cubes, was released by Mindware in 2009. Players score points by building lines that share a common attribute, either color or shape.

== Equipment ==
Qwirkle tileset
	Circle	4pt Star	Diamond	Square	8pt Star	Clover
Red						
Orange						
Yellow						
Green						
Blue						
Purple						

Qwirkle comes with 108 wooden tiles. Each tile is painted with one of six shapes (clover, four-point star, eight-point star, square, circle and diamond) in one of six colors (red, orange, yellow, green, blue and purple); there are three examples of each of the 36 tile color and shape combinations. The box also contains a bag to store the tiles and a rule book.

== Play ==
The game begins with all the tiles being placed in the bag and mixed thoroughly. Each player then draws six random tiles; each player's tiles are not displayed to the other players. All players declare the largest number of tiles of their initial set in one shape or one color, not including duplicates. Play starts with the player who can place the most tiles with their initial draw. After the first player's turn, play proceeds clockwise.

During their turn, a player may either:

- place one or several tiles on the table; or
- instead of playing tiles, or if none of the tiles held can be played, exchange one or more tiles in their hand for random tiles in the draw bag.

At least one of the tiles being placed must continue either the shape or color from at least one tile already laid down. For example: if there are three stars placed down on the grid (one green, one blue, and one purple), then the player can put down another star that is red, orange or yellow next to one of the tiles already laid down. In addition, all of the tiles laid down in a turn must be played in one line, although they do not need to touch other tiles being placed in that turn. Refer to the illustrated example for legal moves.

Players are responsible for tallying and tracking their score at the end of their turn. A player must always end a turn with six tiles, so, if they place tiles during a turn, they draw random tiles to build their hand back up to six.

If the player chooses to exchange tiles instead of placing, replacement tiles are drawn from the bag and the discarded tiles are mixed back into the bag afterward. The player scores no points following an exchanged-tiles turn.

Play continues until one person uses all of their available tiles and there are no more tiles to be drawn.

=== Scoring ===
Players score one point for each tile placed within a line, including existing tiles within the line.

Six bonus points are scored for completing a Qwirkle, which is a continuous line that has all six colors of one shape, or all six shapes of one color. For example: red, orange, yellow, green, blue, and purple circle tiles placed in a single line.

At the end of the game, once there are no more tiles to be drawn to replenish one's hand, the first person to play all of their tiles gains an extra six point bonus, at which point the game ends, and the player who has the highest score wins.

Example Qwirkle gameplay and scoring
Layout										Play	Score
	A	B	C	D	E	F	G	H		Three red tiles are played in a single line [D2]-[D3]-[D4] to start the game. Player scores three points for the red line [D2:D4].	3
1									1	Three red tiles are played in a single line [D2]-[D3]-[D4] to start the game. Player scores three points for the red line [D2:D4].	3
2									2	Three red tiles are played in a single line [D2]-[D3]-[D4] to start the game. Player scores three points for the red line [D2:D4].	3
3									3	Three red tiles are played in a single line [D2]-[D3]-[D4] to start the game. Player scores three points for the red line [D2:D4].	3
4									4	Three red tiles are played in a single line [D2]-[D3]-[D4] to start the game. Player scores three points for the red line [D2:D4].	3
5									5	Three red tiles are played in a single line [D2]-[D3]-[D4] to start the game. Player scores three points for the red line [D2:D4].	3
	A	B	C	D	E	F	G	H		Three red tiles are played in a single line [D2]-[D3]-[D4] to start the game. Player scores three points for the red line [D2:D4].	3
	A	B	C	D	E	F	G	H		At least one tile must be played next to an existing tile, continuing either the shape or the color. In this turn, three square tiles are played in a line [D5]-[E5]-[F5]; the red square tile in [D5] continues from the existing red circle tile in [D4]. Player scores four points for the extended red line [D2:D5], and three points for the new square line [D5:F5].	7
1									1	At least one tile must be played next to an existing tile, continuing either the shape or the color. In this turn, three square tiles are played in a line [D5]-[E5]-[F5]; the red square tile in [D5] continues from the existing red circle tile in [D4]. Player scores four points for the extended red line [D2:D5], and three points for the new square line [D5:F5].	7
2									2	At least one tile must be played next to an existing tile, continuing either the shape or the color. In this turn, three square tiles are played in a line [D5]-[E5]-[F5]; the red square tile in [D5] continues from the existing red circle tile in [D4]. Player scores four points for the extended red line [D2:D5], and three points for the new square line [D5:F5].	7
3									3	At least one tile must be played next to an existing tile, continuing either the shape or the color. In this turn, three square tiles are played in a line [D5]-[E5]-[F5]; the red square tile in [D5] continues from the existing red circle tile in [D4]. Player scores four points for the extended red line [D2:D5], and three points for the new square line [D5:F5].	7
4									4	At least one tile must be played next to an existing tile, continuing either the shape or the color. In this turn, three square tiles are played in a line [D5]-[E5]-[F5]; the red square tile in [D5] continues from the existing red circle tile in [D4]. Player scores four points for the extended red line [D2:D5], and three points for the new square line [D5:F5].	7
5									5	At least one tile must be played next to an existing tile, continuing either the shape or the color. In this turn, three square tiles are played in a line [D5]-[E5]-[F5]; the red square tile in [D5] continues from the existing red circle tile in [D4]. Player scores four points for the extended red line [D2:D5], and three points for the new square line [D5:F5].	7
6									6	At least one tile must be played next to an existing tile, continuing either the shape or the color. In this turn, three square tiles are played in a line [D5]-[E5]-[F5]; the red square tile in [D5] continues from the existing red circle tile in [D4]. Player scores four points for the extended red line [D2:D5], and three points for the new square line [D5:F5].	7
	A	B	C	D	E	F	G	H		At least one tile must be played next to an existing tile, continuing either the shape or the color. In this turn, three square tiles are played in a line [D5]-[E5]-[F5]; the red square tile in [D5] continues from the existing red circle tile in [D4]. Player scores four points for the extended red line [D2:D5], and three points for the new square line [D5:F5].	7
	A	B	C	D	E	F	G	H		One blue circle tile played at [E4], continuing both shape (circle, from [D4]) and color (blue, from [E5]). Player has created two new lines, scoring two points for each: blue line [E4:E5] and circle line [D4:E4].	4
1									1	One blue circle tile played at [E4], continuing both shape (circle, from [D4]) and color (blue, from [E5]). Player has created two new lines, scoring two points for each: blue line [E4:E5] and circle line [D4:E4].	4
2									2	One blue circle tile played at [E4], continuing both shape (circle, from [D4]) and color (blue, from [E5]). Player has created two new lines, scoring two points for each: blue line [E4:E5] and circle line [D4:E4].	4
3									3	One blue circle tile played at [E4], continuing both shape (circle, from [D4]) and color (blue, from [E5]). Player has created two new lines, scoring two points for each: blue line [E4:E5] and circle line [D4:E4].	4
4									4	One blue circle tile played at [E4], continuing both shape (circle, from [D4]) and color (blue, from [E5]). Player has created two new lines, scoring two points for each: blue line [E4:E5] and circle line [D4:E4].	4
5									5	One blue circle tile played at [E4], continuing both shape (circle, from [D4]) and color (blue, from [E5]). Player has created two new lines, scoring two points for each: blue line [E4:E5] and circle line [D4:E4].	4
6									6	One blue circle tile played at [E4], continuing both shape (circle, from [D4]) and color (blue, from [E5]). Player has created two new lines, scoring two points for each: blue line [E4:E5] and circle line [D4:E4].	4
	A	B	C	D	E	F	G	H		One blue circle tile played at [E4], continuing both shape (circle, from [D4]) and color (blue, from [E5]). Player has created two new lines, scoring two points for each: blue line [E4:E5] and circle line [D4:E4].	4
	A	B	C	D	E	F	G	H		Two green tiles played at [C2] and [C3]. Player scores two points for the green line [C2:C3], two points for the clover line [C2:D2], and two points for the diamond line [C3:D3].	6
1									1	Two green tiles played at [C2] and [C3]. Player scores two points for the green line [C2:C3], two points for the clover line [C2:D2], and two points for the diamond line [C3:D3].	6
2									2	Two green tiles played at [C2] and [C3]. Player scores two points for the green line [C2:C3], two points for the clover line [C2:D2], and two points for the diamond line [C3:D3].	6
3									3	Two green tiles played at [C2] and [C3]. Player scores two points for the green line [C2:C3], two points for the clover line [C2:D2], and two points for the diamond line [C3:D3].	6
4									4	Two green tiles played at [C2] and [C3]. Player scores two points for the green line [C2:C3], two points for the clover line [C2:D2], and two points for the diamond line [C3:D3].	6
5									5	Two green tiles played at [C2] and [C3]. Player scores two points for the green line [C2:C3], two points for the clover line [C2:D2], and two points for the diamond line [C3:D3].	6
6									6	Two green tiles played at [C2] and [C3]. Player scores two points for the green line [C2:C3], two points for the clover line [C2:D2], and two points for the diamond line [C3:D3].	6
	A	B	C	D	E	F	G	H		Two green tiles played at [C2] and [C3]. Player scores two points for the green line [C2:C3], two points for the clover line [C2:D2], and two points for the diamond line [C3:D3].	6
	A	B	C	D	E	F	G	H		Two green tiles played at [C1] and [C4]. Although the tiles were not played next to each other, they were played in a single line and at least one of the tiles was played adjacent to tiles already laid down. Player scores four points for the green line [C1:C4] and three points for the circle line [C4:E4].	7
1									1	Two green tiles played at [C1] and [C4]. Although the tiles were not played next to each other, they were played in a single line and at least one of the tiles was played adjacent to tiles already laid down. Player scores four points for the green line [C1:C4] and three points for the circle line [C4:E4].	7
2									2	Two green tiles played at [C1] and [C4]. Although the tiles were not played next to each other, they were played in a single line and at least one of the tiles was played adjacent to tiles already laid down. Player scores four points for the green line [C1:C4] and three points for the circle line [C4:E4].	7
3									3	Two green tiles played at [C1] and [C4]. Although the tiles were not played next to each other, they were played in a single line and at least one of the tiles was played adjacent to tiles already laid down. Player scores four points for the green line [C1:C4] and three points for the circle line [C4:E4].	7
4									4	Two green tiles played at [C1] and [C4]. Although the tiles were not played next to each other, they were played in a single line and at least one of the tiles was played adjacent to tiles already laid down. Player scores four points for the green line [C1:C4] and three points for the circle line [C4:E4].	7
5									5	Two green tiles played at [C1] and [C4]. Although the tiles were not played next to each other, they were played in a single line and at least one of the tiles was played adjacent to tiles already laid down. Player scores four points for the green line [C1:C4] and three points for the circle line [C4:E4].	7
6									6	Two green tiles played at [C1] and [C4]. Although the tiles were not played next to each other, they were played in a single line and at least one of the tiles was played adjacent to tiles already laid down. Player scores four points for the green line [C1:C4] and three points for the circle line [C4:E4].	7
	A	B	C	D	E	F	G	H		Two green tiles played at [C1] and [C4]. Although the tiles were not played next to each other, they were played in a single line and at least one of the tiles was played adjacent to tiles already laid down. Player scores four points for the green line [C1:C4] and three points for the circle line [C4:E4].	7
	A	B	C	D	E	F	G	H		Two square tiles played at [G5] and [G6]. Player scores four points for continuing the existing square line [D5:G5] and two points for the second square line [G5:G6].	6
1									1	Two square tiles played at [G5] and [G6]. Player scores four points for continuing the existing square line [D5:G5] and two points for the second square line [G5:G6].	6
2									2	Two square tiles played at [G5] and [G6]. Player scores four points for continuing the existing square line [D5:G5] and two points for the second square line [G5:G6].	6
3									3	Two square tiles played at [G5] and [G6]. Player scores four points for continuing the existing square line [D5:G5] and two points for the second square line [G5:G6].	6
4									4	Two square tiles played at [G5] and [G6]. Player scores four points for continuing the existing square line [D5:G5] and two points for the second square line [G5:G6].	6
5									5	Two square tiles played at [G5] and [G6]. Player scores four points for continuing the existing square line [D5:G5] and two points for the second square line [G5:G6].	6
6									6	Two square tiles played at [G5] and [G6]. Player scores four points for continuing the existing square line [D5:G5] and two points for the second square line [G5:G6].	6
	A	B	C	D	E	F	G	H		Two square tiles played at [G5] and [G6]. Player scores four points for continuing the existing square line [D5:G5] and two points for the second square line [G5:G6].	6
	A	B	C	D	E	F	G	H		Two 8-point star tiles played at [A1] and [B1]. Player scores three points for the 8pt star line [A1:C1].	3
1									1	Two 8-point star tiles played at [A1] and [B1]. Player scores three points for the 8pt star line [A1:C1].	3
2									2	Two 8-point star tiles played at [A1] and [B1]. Player scores three points for the 8pt star line [A1:C1].	3
3									3	Two 8-point star tiles played at [A1] and [B1]. Player scores three points for the 8pt star line [A1:C1].	3
4									4	Two 8-point star tiles played at [A1] and [B1]. Player scores three points for the 8pt star line [A1:C1].	3
5									5	Two 8-point star tiles played at [A1] and [B1]. Player scores three points for the 8pt star line [A1:C1].	3
6									6	Two 8-point star tiles played at [A1] and [B1]. Player scores three points for the 8pt star line [A1:C1].	3
	A	B	C	D	E	F	G	H		Two 8-point star tiles played at [A1] and [B1]. Player scores three points for the 8pt star line [A1:C1].	3
	A	B	C	D	E	F	G	H		Two orange tiles played at [A2] and [A3]. Player scores three points for the orange line [A1:A3]. Because there was no tile already played in [B2], the player was free to discontinue the clover shapes in [C2] and [D3], but the space [B2] now has been blocked from play as the shape will conflict with the adjacent tiles already played in [A2] and [C2].	3
1									1	Two orange tiles played at [A2] and [A3]. Player scores three points for the orange line [A1:A3]. Because there was no tile already played in [B2], the player was free to discontinue the clover shapes in [C2] and [D3], but the space [B2] now has been blocked from play as the shape will conflict with the adjacent tiles already played in [A2] and [C2].	3
2									2	Two orange tiles played at [A2] and [A3]. Player scores three points for the orange line [A1:A3]. Because there was no tile already played in [B2], the player was free to discontinue the clover shapes in [C2] and [D3], but the space [B2] now has been blocked from play as the shape will conflict with the adjacent tiles already played in [A2] and [C2].	3
3									3	Two orange tiles played at [A2] and [A3]. Player scores three points for the orange line [A1:A3]. Because there was no tile already played in [B2], the player was free to discontinue the clover shapes in [C2] and [D3], but the space [B2] now has been blocked from play as the shape will conflict with the adjacent tiles already played in [A2] and [C2].	3
4									4	Two orange tiles played at [A2] and [A3]. Player scores three points for the orange line [A1:A3]. Because there was no tile already played in [B2], the player was free to discontinue the clover shapes in [C2] and [D3], but the space [B2] now has been blocked from play as the shape will conflict with the adjacent tiles already played in [A2] and [C2].	3
5									5	Two orange tiles played at [A2] and [A3]. Player scores three points for the orange line [A1:A3]. Because there was no tile already played in [B2], the player was free to discontinue the clover shapes in [C2] and [D3], but the space [B2] now has been blocked from play as the shape will conflict with the adjacent tiles already played in [A2] and [C2].	3
6									6	Two orange tiles played at [A2] and [A3]. Player scores three points for the orange line [A1:A3]. Because there was no tile already played in [B2], the player was free to discontinue the clover shapes in [C2] and [D3], but the space [B2] now has been blocked from play as the shape will conflict with the adjacent tiles already played in [A2] and [C2].	3
	A	B	C	D	E	F	G	H		Two orange tiles played at [A2] and [A3]. Player scores three points for the orange line [A1:A3]. Because there was no tile already played in [B2], the player was free to discontinue the clover shapes in [C2] and [D3], but the space [B2] now has been blocked from play as the shape will conflict with the adjacent tiles already played in [A2] and [C2].	3
	A	B	C	D	E	F	G	H		Two yellow tiles played at [B3] and [B4]. Player scores two points for the yellow line [B3:B4], four points for the diamond line [A3:D3], and four points for the circle line [B4:E4].	10
1									1	Two yellow tiles played at [B3] and [B4]. Player scores two points for the yellow line [B3:B4], four points for the diamond line [A3:D3], and four points for the circle line [B4:E4].	10
2									2	Two yellow tiles played at [B3] and [B4]. Player scores two points for the yellow line [B3:B4], four points for the diamond line [A3:D3], and four points for the circle line [B4:E4].	10
3									3	Two yellow tiles played at [B3] and [B4]. Player scores two points for the yellow line [B3:B4], four points for the diamond line [A3:D3], and four points for the circle line [B4:E4].	10
4									4	Two yellow tiles played at [B3] and [B4]. Player scores two points for the yellow line [B3:B4], four points for the diamond line [A3:D3], and four points for the circle line [B4:E4].	10
5									5	Two yellow tiles played at [B3] and [B4]. Player scores two points for the yellow line [B3:B4], four points for the diamond line [A3:D3], and four points for the circle line [B4:E4].	10
6									6	Two yellow tiles played at [B3] and [B4]. Player scores two points for the yellow line [B3:B4], four points for the diamond line [A3:D3], and four points for the circle line [B4:E4].	10
	A	B	C	D	E	F	G	H		Two yellow tiles played at [B3] and [B4]. Player scores two points for the yellow line [B3:B4], four points for the diamond line [A3:D3], and four points for the circle line [B4:E4].	10
	A	B	C	D	E	F	G	H		One red 8pt star tile played at [D1]. Player scores four points for the 8pt star line [A1:D1] and five points for the red line [D1:D5].	9
1									1	One red 8pt star tile played at [D1]. Player scores four points for the 8pt star line [A1:D1] and five points for the red line [D1:D5].	9
2									2	One red 8pt star tile played at [D1]. Player scores four points for the 8pt star line [A1:D1] and five points for the red line [D1:D5].	9
3									3	One red 8pt star tile played at [D1]. Player scores four points for the 8pt star line [A1:D1] and five points for the red line [D1:D5].	9
4									4	One red 8pt star tile played at [D1]. Player scores four points for the 8pt star line [A1:D1] and five points for the red line [D1:D5].	9
5									5	One red 8pt star tile played at [D1]. Player scores four points for the 8pt star line [A1:D1] and five points for the red line [D1:D5].	9
6									6	One red 8pt star tile played at [D1]. Player scores four points for the 8pt star line [A1:D1] and five points for the red line [D1:D5].	9
	A	B	C	D	E	F	G	H		One red 8pt star tile played at [D1]. Player scores four points for the 8pt star line [A1:D1] and five points for the red line [D1:D5].	9
	A	B	C	D	E	F	G	H		Three 4pt star tiles played at [C6]-[D6]-[E6]. Player scores six points for the red line [D1:D6], six points for completing a Qwirkle [D1:D6], three points for the 4pt star line [C6:E6], and three points for the blue line [E4:E6]. Spaces at [C5] and [F6] are blocked from further play.	18
1									1	Three 4pt star tiles played at [C6]-[D6]-[E6]. Player scores six points for the red line [D1:D6], six points for completing a Qwirkle [D1:D6], three points for the 4pt star line [C6:E6], and three points for the blue line [E4:E6]. Spaces at [C5] and [F6] are blocked from further play.	18
2									2	Three 4pt star tiles played at [C6]-[D6]-[E6]. Player scores six points for the red line [D1:D6], six points for completing a Qwirkle [D1:D6], three points for the 4pt star line [C6:E6], and three points for the blue line [E4:E6]. Spaces at [C5] and [F6] are blocked from further play.	18
3									3	Three 4pt star tiles played at [C6]-[D6]-[E6]. Player scores six points for the red line [D1:D6], six points for completing a Qwirkle [D1:D6], three points for the 4pt star line [C6:E6], and three points for the blue line [E4:E6]. Spaces at [C5] and [F6] are blocked from further play.	18
4									4	Three 4pt star tiles played at [C6]-[D6]-[E6]. Player scores six points for the red line [D1:D6], six points for completing a Qwirkle [D1:D6], three points for the 4pt star line [C6:E6], and three points for the blue line [E4:E6]. Spaces at [C5] and [F6] are blocked from further play.	18
5									5	Three 4pt star tiles played at [C6]-[D6]-[E6]. Player scores six points for the red line [D1:D6], six points for completing a Qwirkle [D1:D6], three points for the 4pt star line [C6:E6], and three points for the blue line [E4:E6]. Spaces at [C5] and [F6] are blocked from further play.	18
6									6	Three 4pt star tiles played at [C6]-[D6]-[E6]. Player scores six points for the red line [D1:D6], six points for completing a Qwirkle [D1:D6], three points for the 4pt star line [C6:E6], and three points for the blue line [E4:E6]. Spaces at [C5] and [F6] are blocked from further play.	18
	A	B	C	D	E	F	G	H		Three 4pt star tiles played at [C6]-[D6]-[E6]. Player scores six points for the red line [D1:D6], six points for completing a Qwirkle [D1:D6], three points for the 4pt star line [C6:E6], and three points for the blue line [E4:E6]. Spaces at [C5] and [F6] are blocked from further play.	18
	A	B	C	D	E	F	G	H		Two square tiles played at [H5] and [H6]. Player scores five points for the square line [D5:H5], two points for the new square line [H5:H6], and two points for the square line [G6:H6].	9
1									1	Two square tiles played at [H5] and [H6]. Player scores five points for the square line [D5:H5], two points for the new square line [H5:H6], and two points for the square line [G6:H6].	9
2									2	Two square tiles played at [H5] and [H6]. Player scores five points for the square line [D5:H5], two points for the new square line [H5:H6], and two points for the square line [G6:H6].	9
3									3	Two square tiles played at [H5] and [H6]. Player scores five points for the square line [D5:H5], two points for the new square line [H5:H6], and two points for the square line [G6:H6].	9
4									4	Two square tiles played at [H5] and [H6]. Player scores five points for the square line [D5:H5], two points for the new square line [H5:H6], and two points for the square line [G6:H6].	9
5									5	Two square tiles played at [H5] and [H6]. Player scores five points for the square line [D5:H5], two points for the new square line [H5:H6], and two points for the square line [G6:H6].	9
6									6	Two square tiles played at [H5] and [H6]. Player scores five points for the square line [D5:H5], two points for the new square line [H5:H6], and two points for the square line [G6:H6].	9
	A	B	C	D	E	F	G	H		Two square tiles played at [H5] and [H6]. Player scores five points for the square line [D5:H5], two points for the new square line [H5:H6], and two points for the square line [G6:H6].	9

== History ==
According to Ross, she conceived Qwirkle while watching two friends playing Scrabble and realizing how her favorite part of that game is when words are spelled in two different directions. After a few days, she had simplified her idea to use abstract shapes and colors and added the six-component bonus, calling the concept Abstrackle when she pitched it to MindWare, who gave it the final name.

Qwirkle gained internet fame after review copies were sent to industry websites, including to Scott Alden, who operated BoardGameGeek and W. Eric Martin, who ran Boardgame News. Martin brought the game with him on a trip to Berlin and played it with game designers there, including Thorsten Gimmler, a product manager at Schmidt Spiele, who went on to contact MindWare directly, asking for the rights for a German release. With its release there in 2010, it became eligible for the Spiel des Jahres.

=== Awards ===
- 2011 Spiel des Jahres
- Parent's Choice Gold Award
- Mensa Select Award
- Major Fun Award

== Variants and expansions ==
Rather than wooden tiles, the game can be played with six-sided dice (Qwirkle Cubes) or cards (Qwirkle Cards). In addition, the original game has two expansions: Qwirkle Select and Qwirkle Connect; these are sold bundled with the original game as Qwirkle Big Box or Qwirkle Trio.

=== Qwirkle Cubes ===
Qwirkle Cubes has the same goals and gameplay mechanics as Qwirkle, but instead of tiles, the playing pieces are 90 six-sided dice; there are 15 dice in each of the six colors. All six shapes of a given color are printed on the six faces of a single die.

After the initial draw, each player rolls the six dice they had selected to form their hand, which is kept visible to the other players. As in Qwirkle, players may place one or more dice into the playing field during their turn; if they do not have a piece that can be played, they must re-roll all of their dice until they can place at least one die. At the end of their turn, the player draws replacement dice and rolls the replacement dice (not the leftover dice already in the player's hand) before absorbing the replacement dice into their six-dice hand.

=== Qwirkle Cards ===
Qwirkle Cards, also known as Qwirkle Rummy, follows the same pattern/shape matching mechanic of Qwirkle, but uses 108 playing cards instead of the wooden tiles. Each player receives nine cards to start. Rather than placing tiles face-up in a tableau with matching edges, cards are played into stacks of matched colors or shapes. Each player may play multiple cards into more than one stack during their turn; a new stack can be formed by the player, provided that stack has at least three cards in it and none of the cards are duplicates. When a Qwirkle stack is formed, the player removes the completed stack and keeps it for scoring at the end. In addition, after placing cards in play, the player may switch any cards previously played by moving one or more cards into a different stack, with the caveat that after the switching is completed, all stacks are a three-card minimum size with no duplicates.

== Reviews ==
- Family Games: The 100 Best
