= South Terrace =

South Terrace may refer to:

- South Terrace, Adelaide, Australia
- South Terrace, Fremantle, Australia
