= Clue: The Great Museum Caper =

Clue: The Great Museum Caper, (also known as Galerie der Diebe) was a spinoff of the board game Cluedo (Clue in Canada and the United States). It was produced by Parker Brothers and Waddingtons Games. Clue: The Great Museum Caper was originally produced in 1991, and production ceased soon thereafter. It took place in a museum, and was played with a thief and players. The museum is owned by Mr. Boddy, the murder victim in the original.

== Brief gameplay ==
One player takes the role of an invisible thief sneaking through an art museum outfitted with security systems like cameras, motion detectors, and a command center, while the other players collaborate to devise a strategy to catch the culprit. The Great Museum Caper features a 3‑D museum board stocked with miniature art masterpieces that a player must attempt to steal.

The invisible thief sneaks into Mr. Boddy's art museum to steal paintings while the other players—classic Clue characters—work together to track them down. The thief secretly plots each move, trying to escape unnoticed, and the game ends when a character lands on the thief's space and forces a surrender, making it a strategic experience for two to four players ages ten and up. The players take turns playing the thief.

A game takes up to an hour on average to play. It requires a minimum of two players, with a maximum of four players. The players attempt to catch the thief before he/she can steal as many paintings as possible and escape. The players roll two dice: one standard 1-6 die, and a special proprietary die. The second die contains symbols that represent actions players can take. The thief can move one, two, or three spaces after each detective's move and tracks his/her pawn separately from the gameboard. The players win by landing on exactly the same space as the thief. The thief wins by escaping from the building with as many treasures as possible. The Rules suggest the thief should acquire at least 3 paintings... maybe more... no less.

== Reception ==
The kids magazine Zillions had 26 children test 10 new toys and games for its December 1991-January 1992 issue, and they summed up Clue: The Great Museum Caper as a visually appealing game with a fun 3‑D board but ultimately too complicated, earning a clear thumbs‑down from its kid testers who preferred regular Clue.

Judy Massey for The Winchester Star said that "For game fans who enjoy Clue by Parker Brothers, Clue — The Great Museum Caper can offer hours of fun."
