= Board game =

Tabletop social game

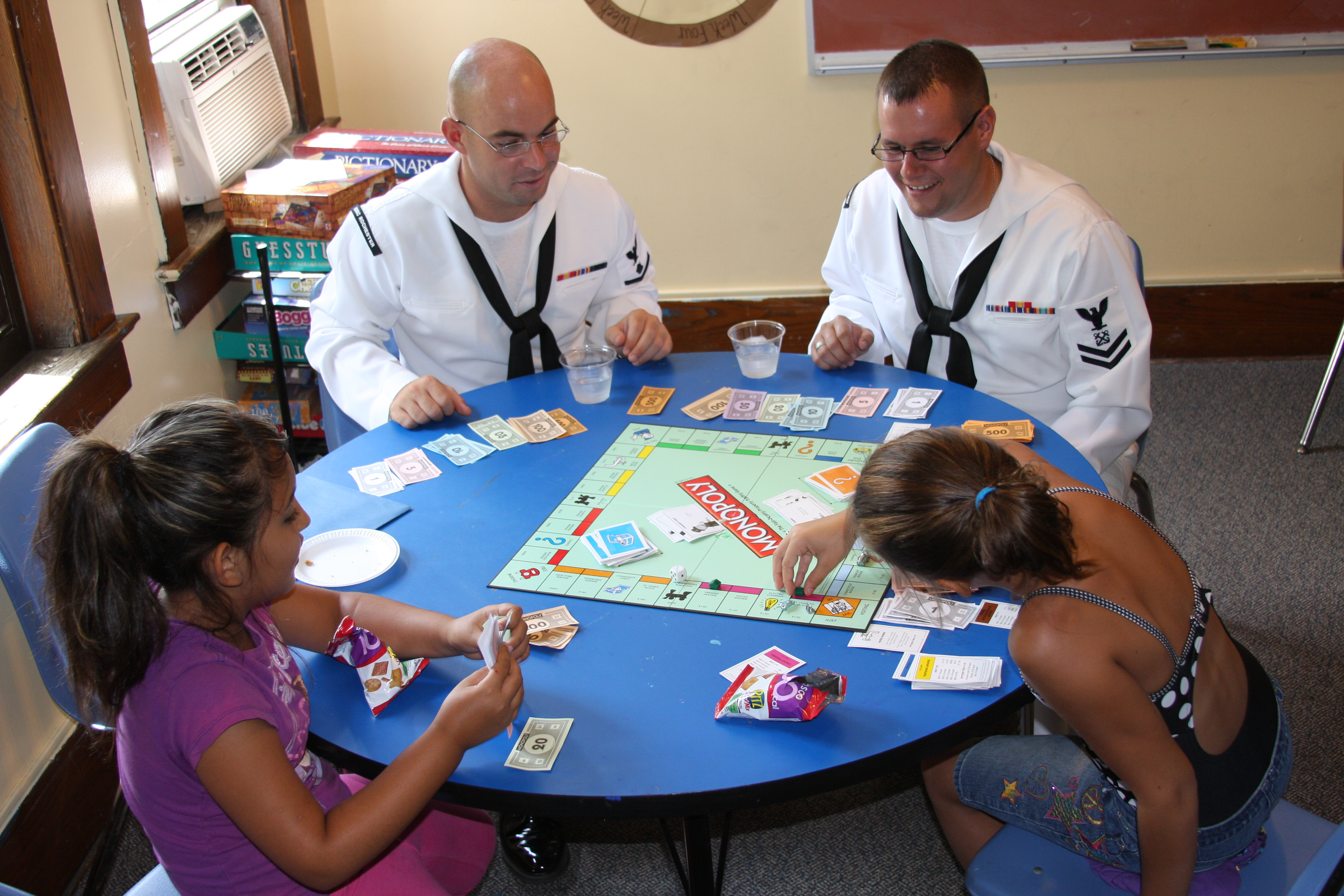
The popular board game Monopoly is licensed in 103 countries and printed in 37 languages.

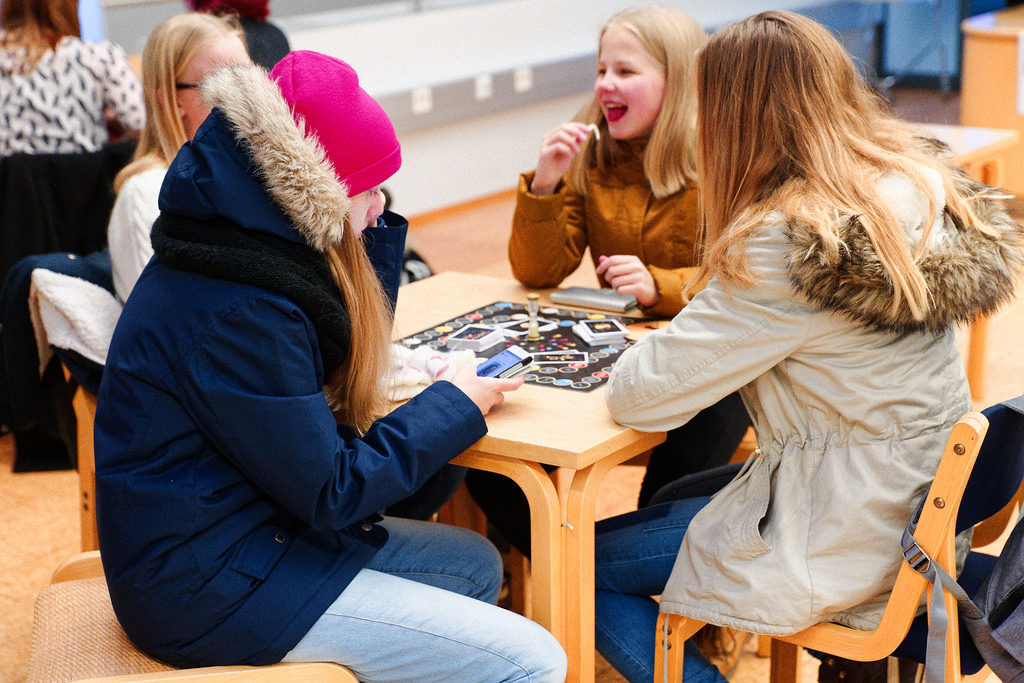
Young girls playing Alias in a library at Iisalmi, Finland, 2016

The board game is a type of tabletop game that involves small objects (game pieces) that are placed and moved in particular ways on a specially designed patterned game board, potentially including other components, e.g. dice. The earliest known uses of the term "board game" are between the 1840s and 1850s.

While game boards are a necessary and sufficient condition of this genre, card games that do not use a standard deck of cards, as well as games that use neither cards nor a game board, are often colloquially included, with some referring to this genre generally as "table and board games" or simply "tabletop games".

== Eras ==
=== Ancient era ===
Board games have been played, traveled, and evolved in most cultures and societies throughout history. They have been discovered in several archaeological sites, and there are several contenders for the oldest game, depending on the exact requirements applied and the accuracy of dating.

Archaeological finds of game boards exist that date from as early as the Neolithic period, including, as of 2024, a total of 14 sites reporting 51 game boards, ranging from the early 7000s BC to the mid-6000s BC.

Some of the oldest discovered gaming pieces have been discovered in southwest Turkey, including a set of elaborate sculptured stones in sets of four, speculated to be designed for a chess-like game, which were created during the Bronze Age around 3000 BC.

Senet has been argued to be the oldest known board game in the world, with possible game board fragments (c. 3100 BC) and undisputed pictorial representations (c. 2686 BC – c. 2613 BC) having been found in ancient Egyptian Predynastic and First Dynasty burials dating as far back as 3500 BC. However, while Senet was played for thousands of years, it fell out of fashion sometime after AD 400 during the Roman period; the rules were never written down, therefore they are not decisively known.

Similarly, Mehen, also from ancient Egypt, is one of the oldest games dated with reasonable confidence, at c. 3000 BC – c. 2300 BC, with some estimating it dates back to c. 3500 BC. The rules, scoring system, and game pieces, however, are also unknown or speculative.

The Royal Game of Ur is estimated to have originated around 2500 BC in ancient Mesopotamia, with specimens found in royal tombs. It has been claimed to be the oldest playable board game in the world, with well-defined game rules discovered written on a cuneiform tablet by a Babylonian astronomer in c. 177 BC – c. 176 BC.

Another game similar to the Royal Game of Ur was discovered in 1977 by the Italian Archaeological Mission in grave no. 731, a pseudo-catacomb grave at Shahr-i Sokhta, a UNESCO World Heritage archaeological site in Iran. This board game set, comprising 27 pieces and 4 different dice, dates to 2600 – 2400 BC. The set has been scientifically analyzed and a reconstruction has been proposed by researchers. It has similarly been claimed to be the oldest complete and playable board game ever discovered.

An example of a game with highly uncertain age is mancala, which includes a broad family of board games with a core design of two rows of small circular divots or bowls carved into a surface. It has had numerous estimations of its generic age due to the many variants that have been discovered in different locations across Africa, the Middle East, and southern Asia. These are dated across many different periods at different sites, from c. 800 BC – c. 200 BC (Roman Settlements); to c. 2500 BC – c. 1500 BC (Egypt); and even c. 7000 BC – c. 5000 BC (Jordan). The latter is based on divots carved out of limestone in a Neolithic dwelling dated to c. 5870 BC ± 240 BC, although this has been disputed.

Furthermore, when considering Neolithic period game board discoveries, caution has been given against considering these finds as representing the definitively earliest human game playing, as the absence of evidence of such games in earlier periods does not equate to evidence that no games were played.

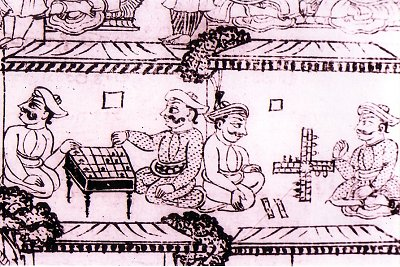
Men Playing Board Games, from The Sougandhika Parinaya Manuscript

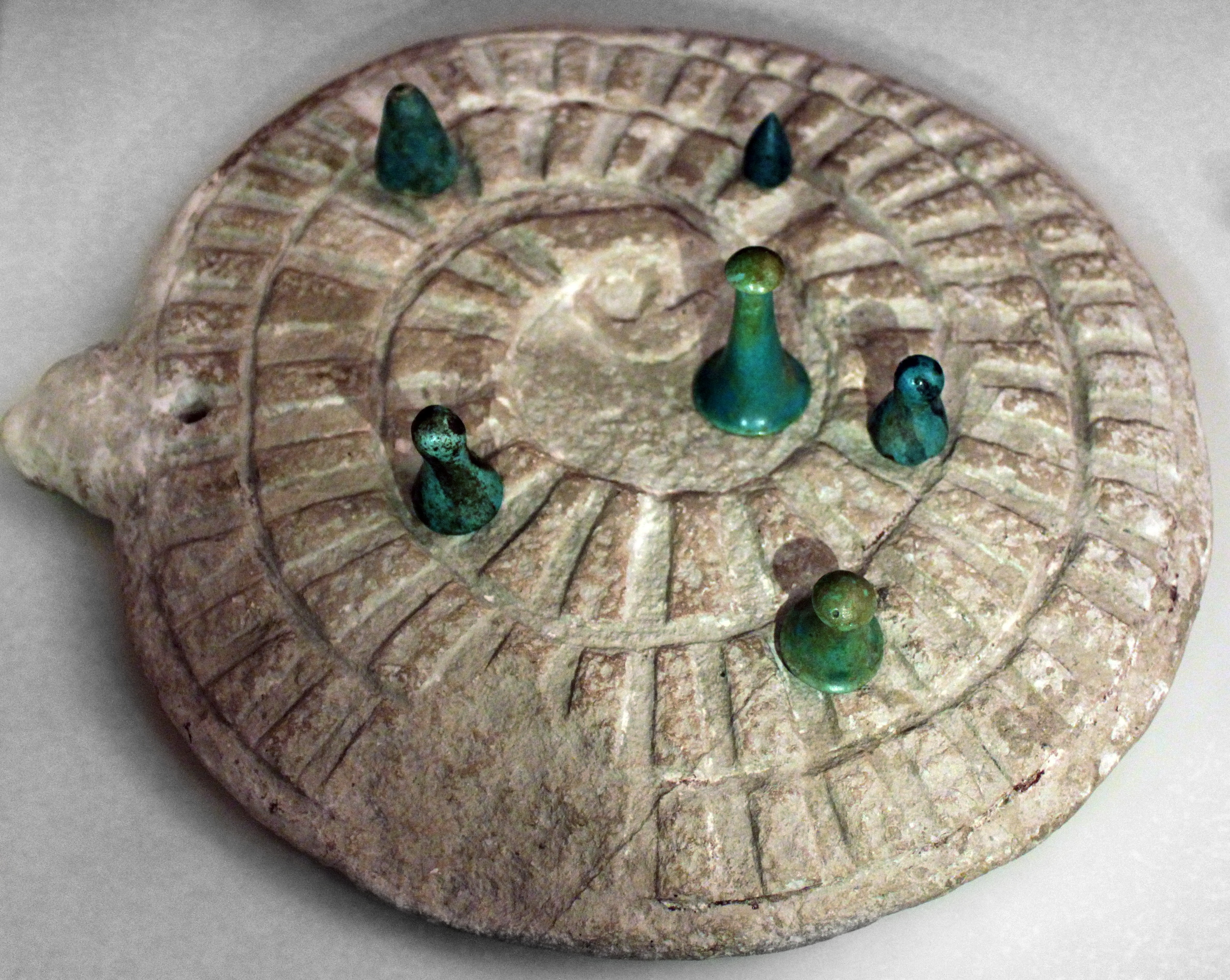
Mehen game with game stones, from Abydos, Egypt, 3000 BC, Neues Museum

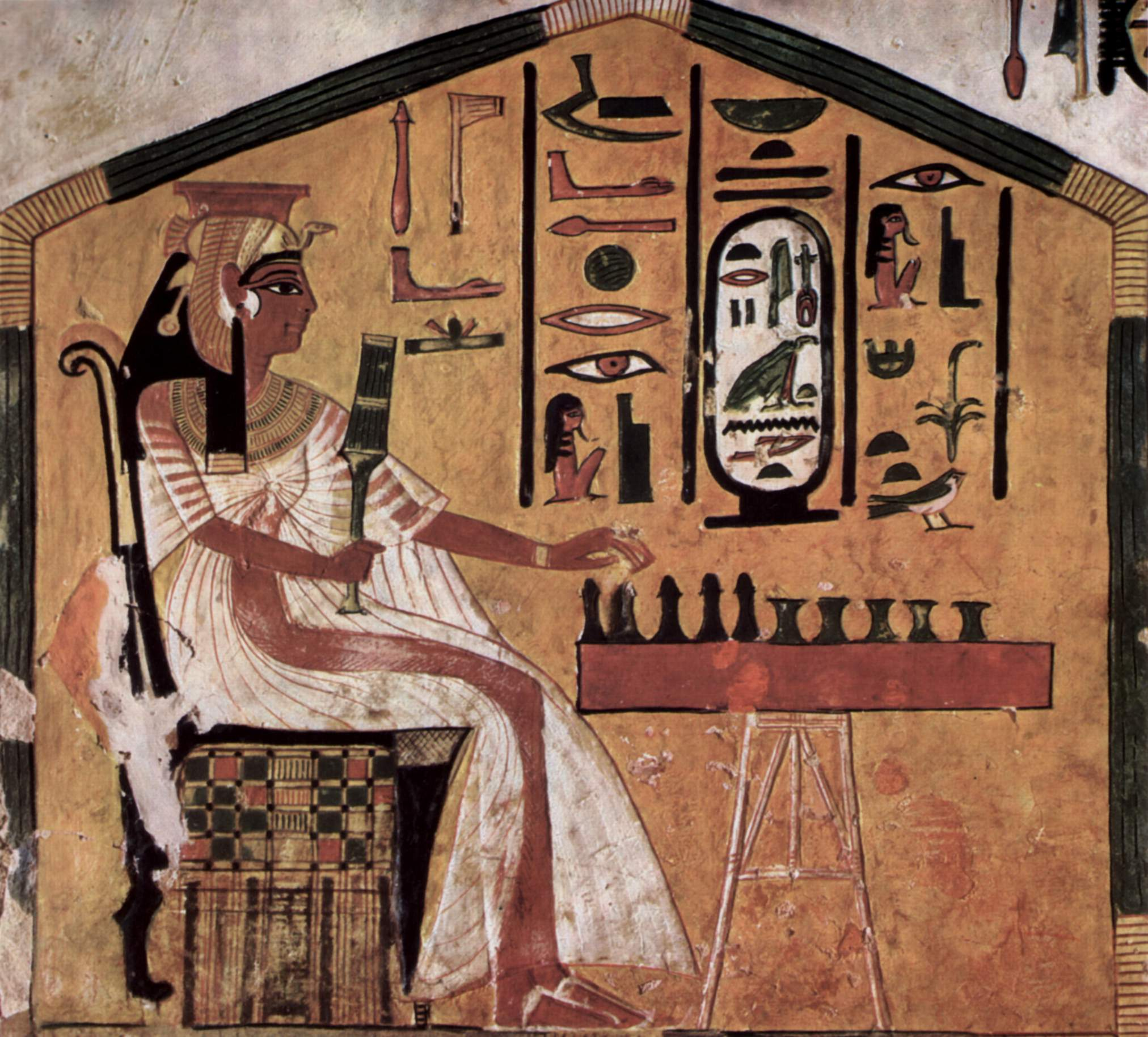
Painting in tomb of Egyptian queen Nefertari (1295 – 1255 BC) playing senet

=== Golden era ===
The 1880s–1920s were a board game epoch known as the Golden Age, a term coined by American art historian Margaret Hofer, where the popularity of board games was boosted through mass production, making them cheaper and more readily available. The most popular of the board games sold during this period was Monopoly (1935), with 500 million games played as of 1999.

=== Renaissance era ===
The number of board games published by year (1944–2017), as listed on BoardGameGeek. Expansion sets for existing games are marked in orange.

In the late 1990s, companies began producing more new games to serve a growing worldwide market. The Settlers of Catan (1995) is often credited with popularising German-style board games outside of Europe and growing the hobbyist game market to a wider audience. The early 21st century saw the emergence of a new "Golden Age" for board games called the "Board Game Renaissance". This period of board games industry development, of which board games such as Carcassonne (2000) and Ticket to Ride (2004) were a major part, saw a shift away from the 20th-century domination by well-established standby Golden Era board games like Monopoly (1935) and Game of Life (1960).

== Regional history ==
=== Europe ===
Board games have a long tradition in Europe. The oldest records of board gaming in Europe date back to Homer's Iliad (written in the 8th century BC), in which he mentions the Ancient Greek game of petteia. This game of petteia would later evolve into the Roman game of ludus latrunculorum.

- Germany
  Kriegsspiel is a genre of wargaming developed in 19th century Prussia, to teach battle tactics to officers.
- Ireland
  Fidchell boards dating from the 10th century has been uncovered in Ireland, with the game said to date back to at least 144 AD.
- Scandinavia
  The ancient Norse game of hnefatafl was developed sometime before 400 AD.
- United Kingdom
  In the United Kingdom, the association of dice and cards with gambling led to all dice games except backgammon being treated as "lotteries by dice" in the Gaming Acts of 1710 and 1845. One of the most prolific publishers of board games of the late 18th and early 19th centuries was the English board game publisher John Wallis and his sons (John Wallis Jr. and Edward Wallis). The global popularisation of board games, with special themes and branding, coincided with the formation of the global dominance of the British Empire. Examples of british empire games included:

British Empire Games
Game title	Release date	Creator	Description	Ref
A Tour Through the British Colonies and Foreign Possessions	1850	John Betts	This board game was a race game that consisted of a board with 37 numbered pictures, each correlating to a British colony, arranged in four circular levels, numbered 1 (Heligoland, Germany) to 37 (London, England), three concentric ones and an inner fourth level of London ("Metropolis of the British Empire"). A teetotum was spun with a player's piece correspondingly moving ahead through the spaces of the game board, upon which a corresponding description to the space the player lands was read out aloud from an accompanying rule booklet by the presiding player (a player abstaining from directly playing the game), except when directed in the book. The descriptions included commentary about the various colonies and occasional game board movement directions to the player. There winner would be the player to reach London first.	
A Voyage of Discovery, or The Five Navigators	1836	William Spooner	A race game where five players ('sailors') follow distinctly colored tracks, on a board decorated with islands, seas, and ships, with each player restricted to the path of their own color. The players followed the instructions printed in circles along the tracks, which contained sailor-themed dangers and advantages.	

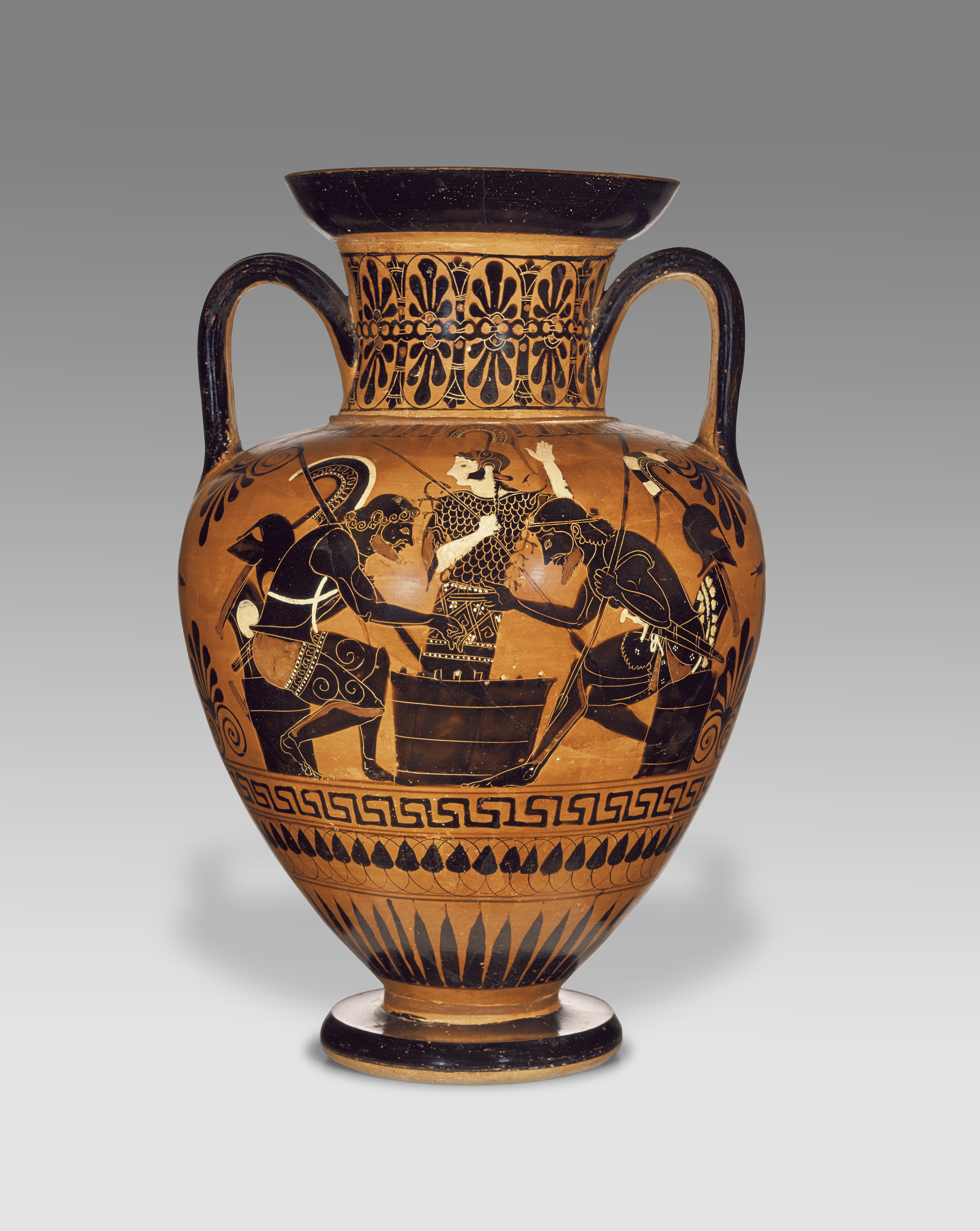
Achilles and Ajax playing a board game overseen by Athena, Attic black-figure neck amphora, c. 510 BC

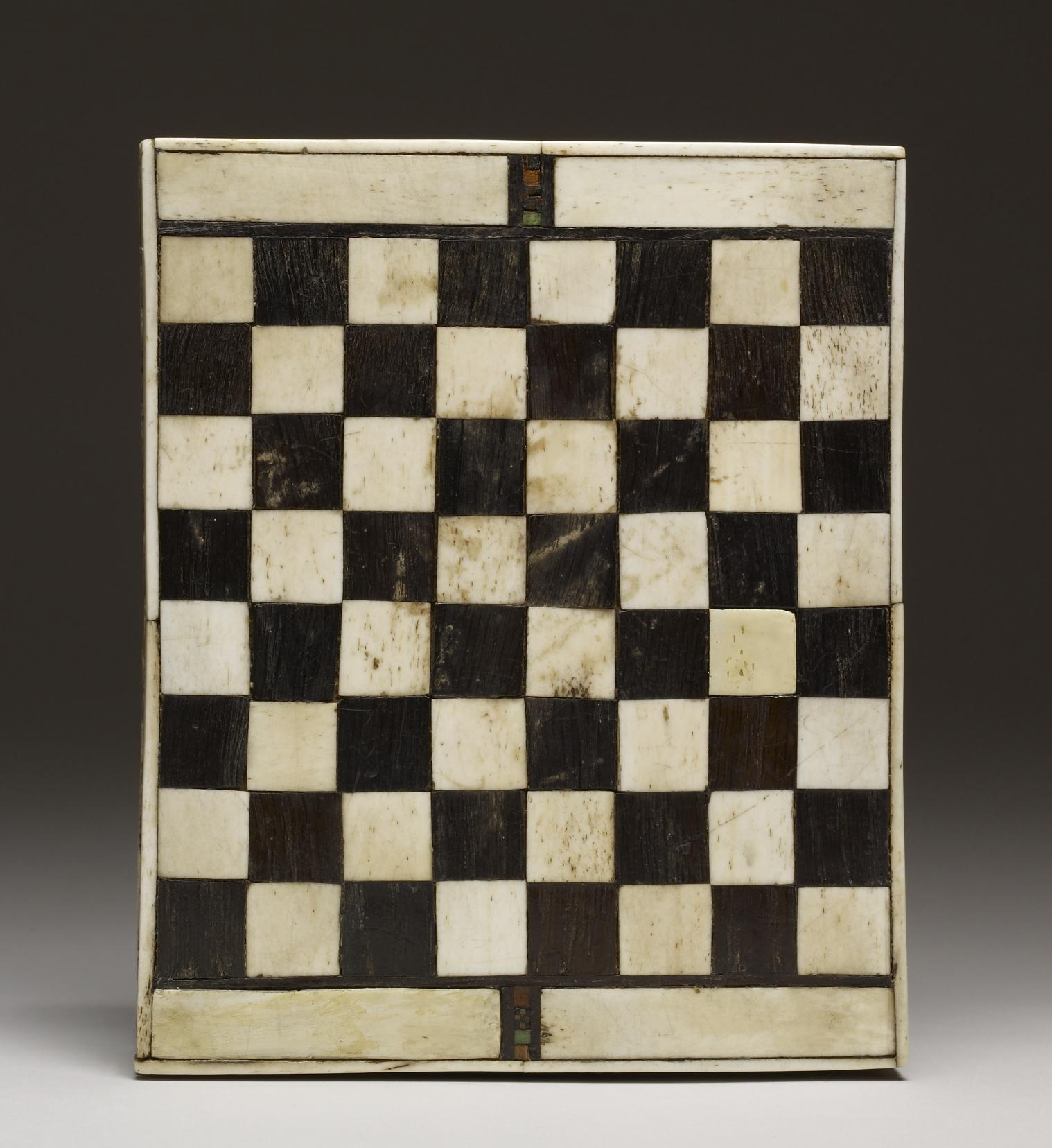
Box for Board Games, c. 15th century, Walters Art Museum

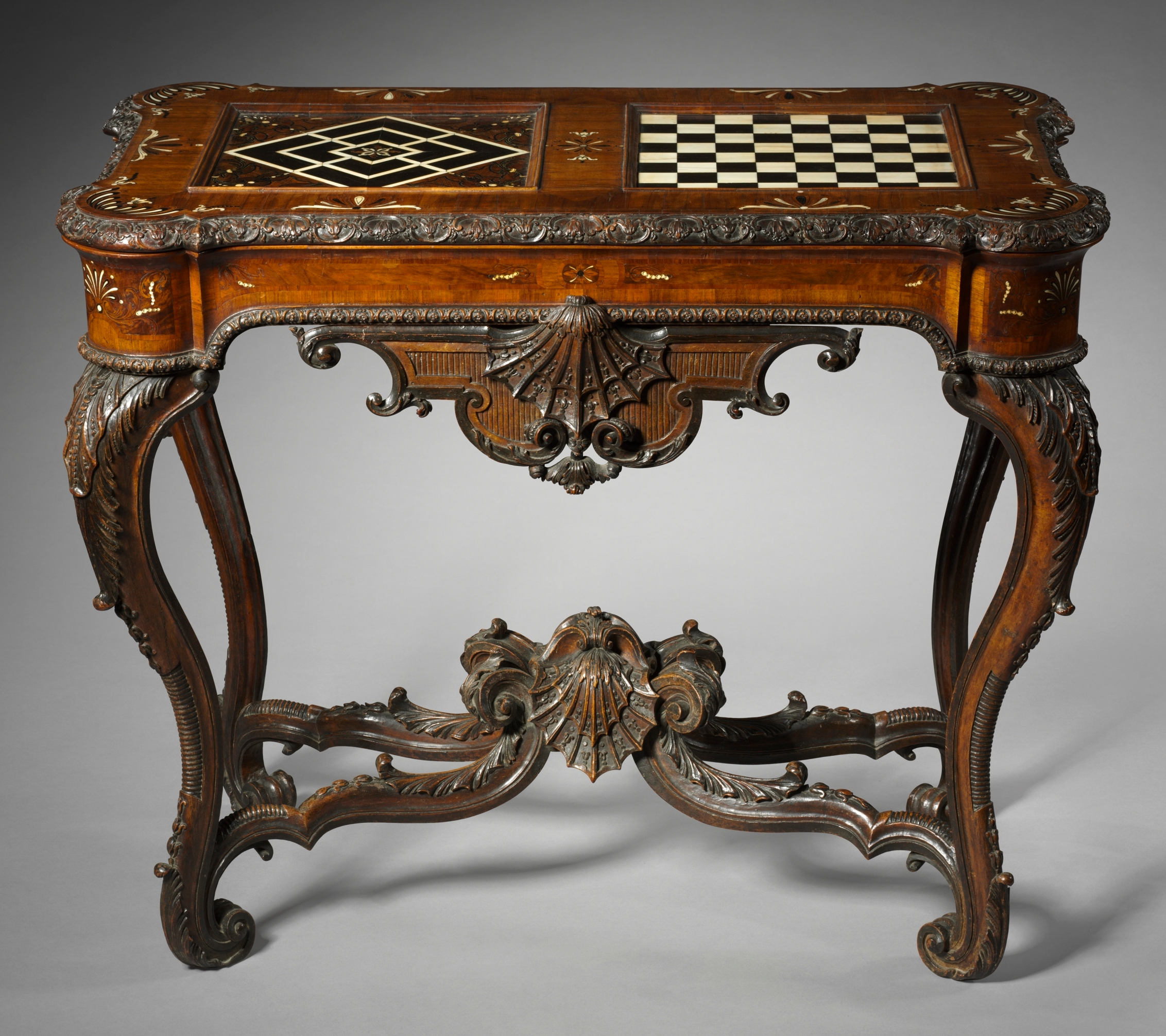
An early games table desk (Germany, 1735) featuring chess/checkers (right) and nine men's morris (left)

=== Americas ===
The board game patolli originated in Mesoamerica and was played by a wide range of pre-Columbian cultures such as the Toltecs and the Aztecs.

- United States
  Due to a number of factors, such as the decrease of industrial working hours and the implementation of a Saturday half-day holiday, United States shifted from agrarian to urban living in the nineteenth century, which provided greater leisure time and a rise in middle class income. The American home, once an economic production focus, started to become one for entertainment, enlightenment, and education under maternal supervision, where children were encouraged to play board games that developed literacy skills and provided moral instruction.
  The first board games published in the United States were Travellers' Tour Through the United States and its sister game Traveller's Tour Through Europe, published in 1822 by New York City bookseller F. & R. Lockwood. Margaret Hofer described this period, from 1880s–1920s, as "The Golden Age" of board gaming in America. Board game popularity was boosted, like that of many items, through mass production, which made them cheaper and more easily available. In the 19th century, the industry itself was still developing, albeit significantly more rapidly; however, the games manufactured in America were still primarily for children. Beginning in the late 20th century, during the period known as board game renaissance, games started to evolve considerably, from a strategic play standpoint and also in terms of increased advertising and marketing. In the modern-day United States, board game venues have recently grown in popularity. In 2016 alone, more than 5,000 board game cafés opened in the United States.
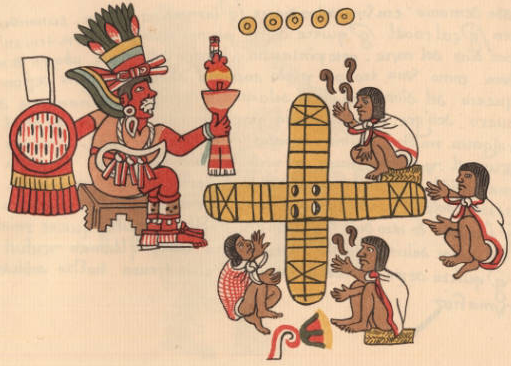
Patolli game being watched by Macuilxochitl as depicted on page 048 of the Codex Magliabechiano

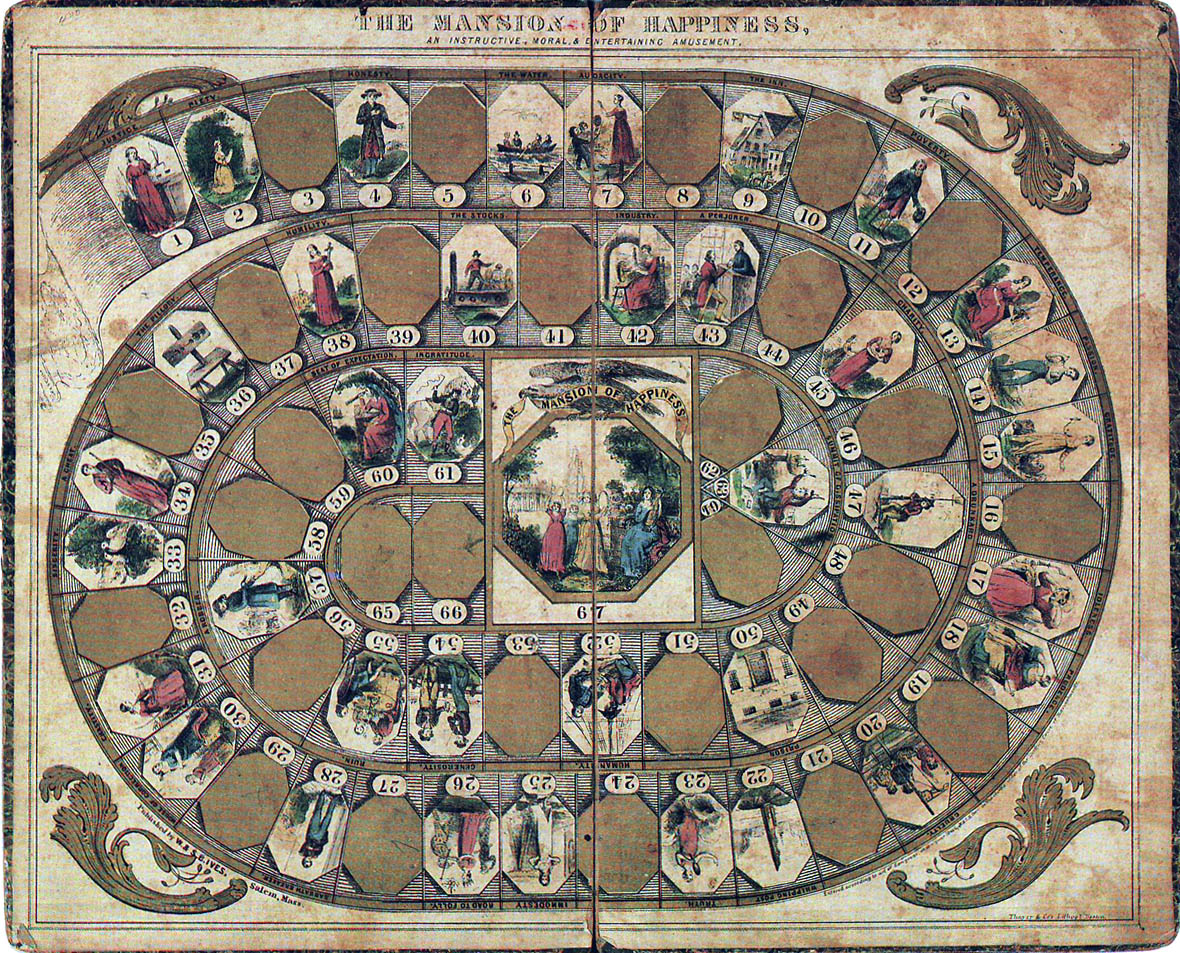
The Mansion of Happiness (1843)

=== Asia ===
- Mesopotamia
  A version of the 4,600-year-old board game of the Royal Game of Ur, was found in the ancient Mesopotamian royal tombs of Ur (c. 2600 BC – c. 2400 BC), is the oldest discovered playable board game. The game's rules of this version were written on a cuneiform tablet by a Babylonian astronomer in 177 BC, and involved two players racing their pieces from one end of a 20-square board to the other in a similar way to backgammon, with the central squares being used for fortune telling. Backgammon also originated in ancient Mesopotamia about 5,000 years ago.
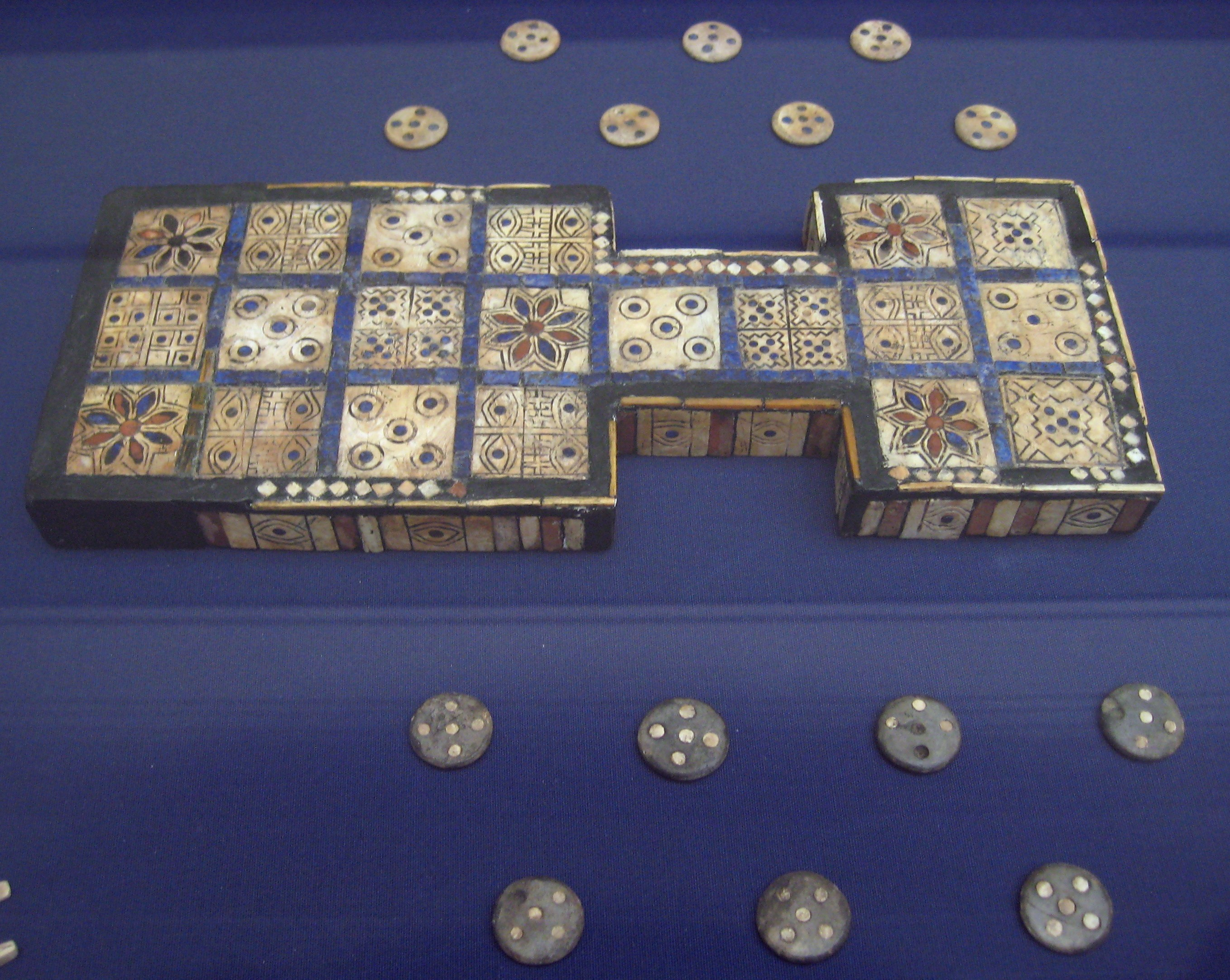
  The Royal Game of Ur, southern Iraq, about c. 2600 BC – c. 2400 BC
- China
  Though speculative, Go has been thought to have originated in China somewhere in the 10th and 4th century BC. While no archeological or reliable documentary evidence exists of the exact origins of the game, according to legend, Liubo was invented in around 1728–1675 BC in China by Wu Cao, a minister of King Jie the last Xia dynasty king. China developed several chess variants, including xiangqi (Chinese chess), dou shou qi (Chinese animal chess), and luzhanqi (Chinese army chess), each with their own variants. Games like mahjong, and Fighting the Landlords (Dou DiZhu) also originated in China.
  In modern-day China, board game cafes have become popular, with cities like Shanghai having more game cafés than Starbucks.
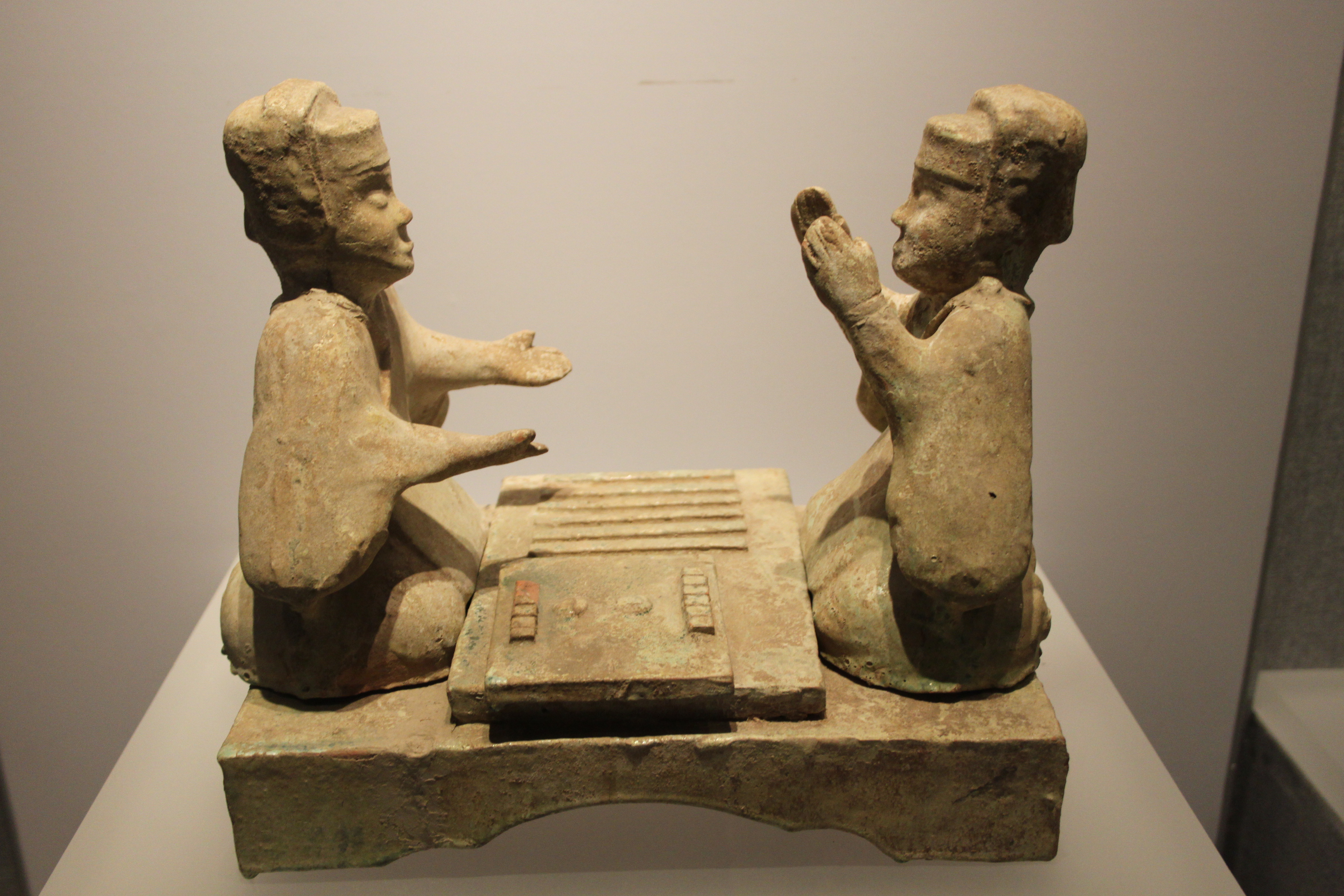
  Han dynasty glazed pottery tomb figurines playing liubo, with six sticks laid out to the side of the game board
- India
  Ashtapada, chess, pachisi and chaupar originated in India. In modern day India, a community game called Carrom is popular.
  In Thailand, makruk (Thai: หมากรุก), or Thai chess, is a strategy board game that is descended from the 6th-century Indian game of chaturanga or a close relative thereof, and is therefore related to chess. It is part of the family of chess variants.
  In Cambodia, where basically the same game is played, it is known as ouk (Khmer: អុក) or ouk chatrang (Khmer: អុកចត្រង្គ)
- Iran
  The Shahr-i Sokhta board game set, comprising 27 pieces and 4 different dice, dates to 2600–2400 BCE. The entire set has been scientifically analyzed and reconstructed by researchers, and it is considered the oldest complete and playable board game ever discovered. Jiroft civilization game boards in Iran, is one of several important historical sites, artifacts, and documents shed light on early board games.
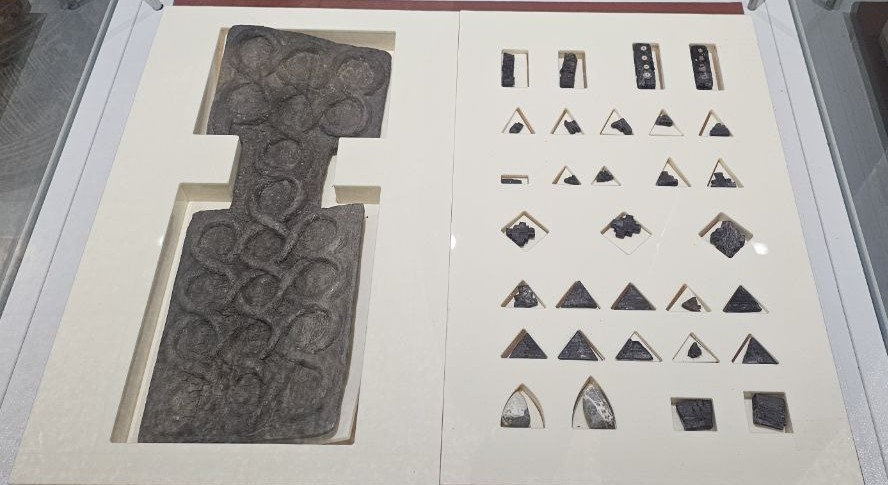
  The complete set of the Shahr-i Sokhta board game, Iran, with 27 pieces and 4 dice in its current condition, about c. 2600 BC – c. 2400 BC National Museum of Iran
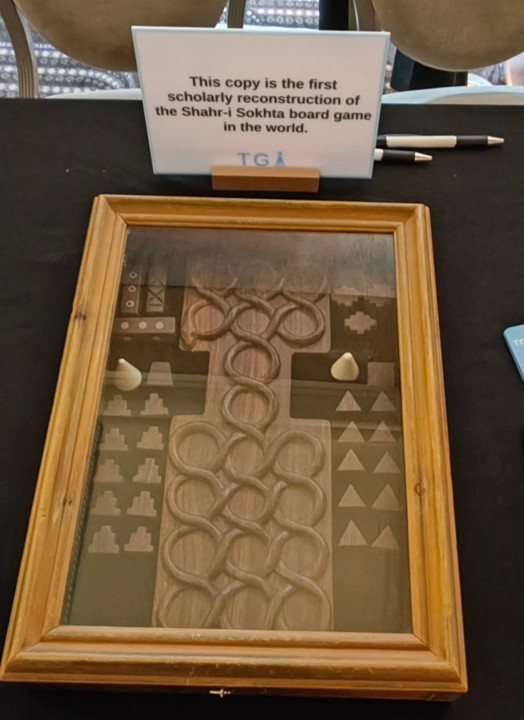
  The first-ever scholarly reconstruction of the Shahr-i Sokhta board game
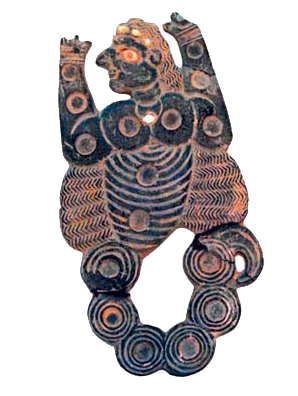
  Game board made of chlorite stone relief in the form of Scorpion man, characteristic of the gaming tradition in West Asia from the 3rd to 1st millennium B.C.
- South Korea
  A board game of flicking stones (Alkkagi) became popular among people in South Korea after various Korean variety shows demonstrated its gameplay on television.
- Oman
  A stone slab carved with a grid and cup holes to hold game pieces constituting a large 4,000-year-old stone board game was located in a prehistoric settlement dated back to the Umm an-Nar period (c. 2600 BC to c. 2000 BC) near the village of Ayn Bani Saidahat in the Qumayrah Valley, Oman.

=== Africa ===
In Africa and the Middle East, mancala is a popular board game archetype with many regional variations.

- Egypt
  The first complete set of this game was discovered from a Theban tomb that dates to the 13th dynasty. Hounds and jackals, another ancient Egyptian board game, appeared around 2000 BC. This game, originating c. 2600 BC – c. 2400 BC was also popular in Mesopotamia and the Caucasus. Senet, originating from c. 2600 BC – c. 2400 BC, was found in Predynastic c. 3500 BC and First Dynasty c. 3100 BC burials of Egypt, and pictured in fresco wall paintings and papyrus in Egyptian tombs, including the tombs of Merknera (c. 3300 BC–c. 2700 BC BC) and Nikauhor and Sekhemhathor (c. 2465 BC–c. 2389 BC). An ancient games from the African region included the predynastic Egyptian board game of mehen.
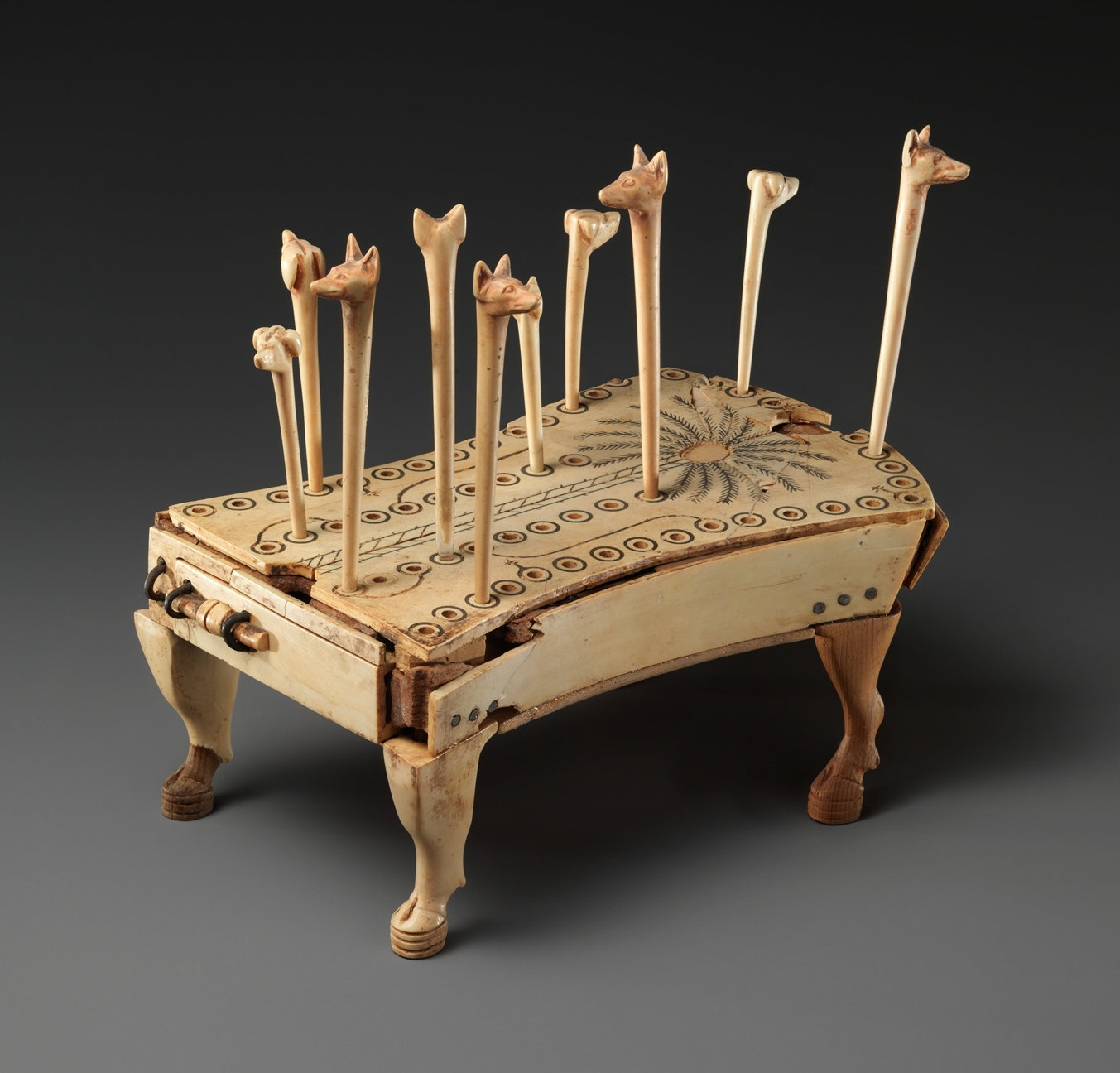
Hounds and jackals (Egypt, 13th Dynasty)

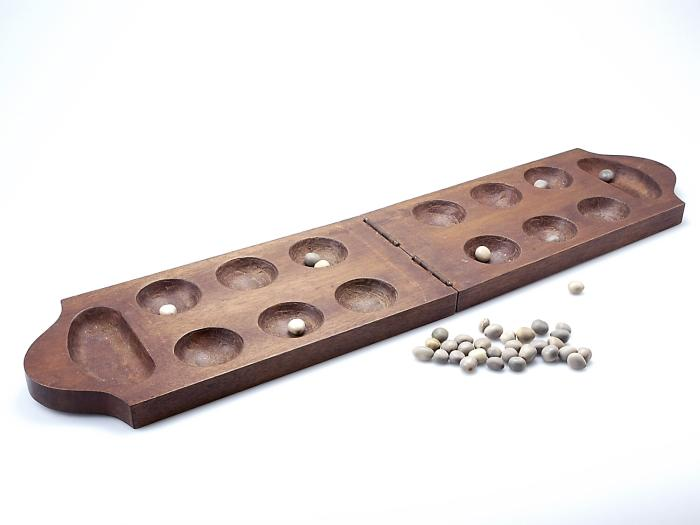
Mancala board and clay playing pieces

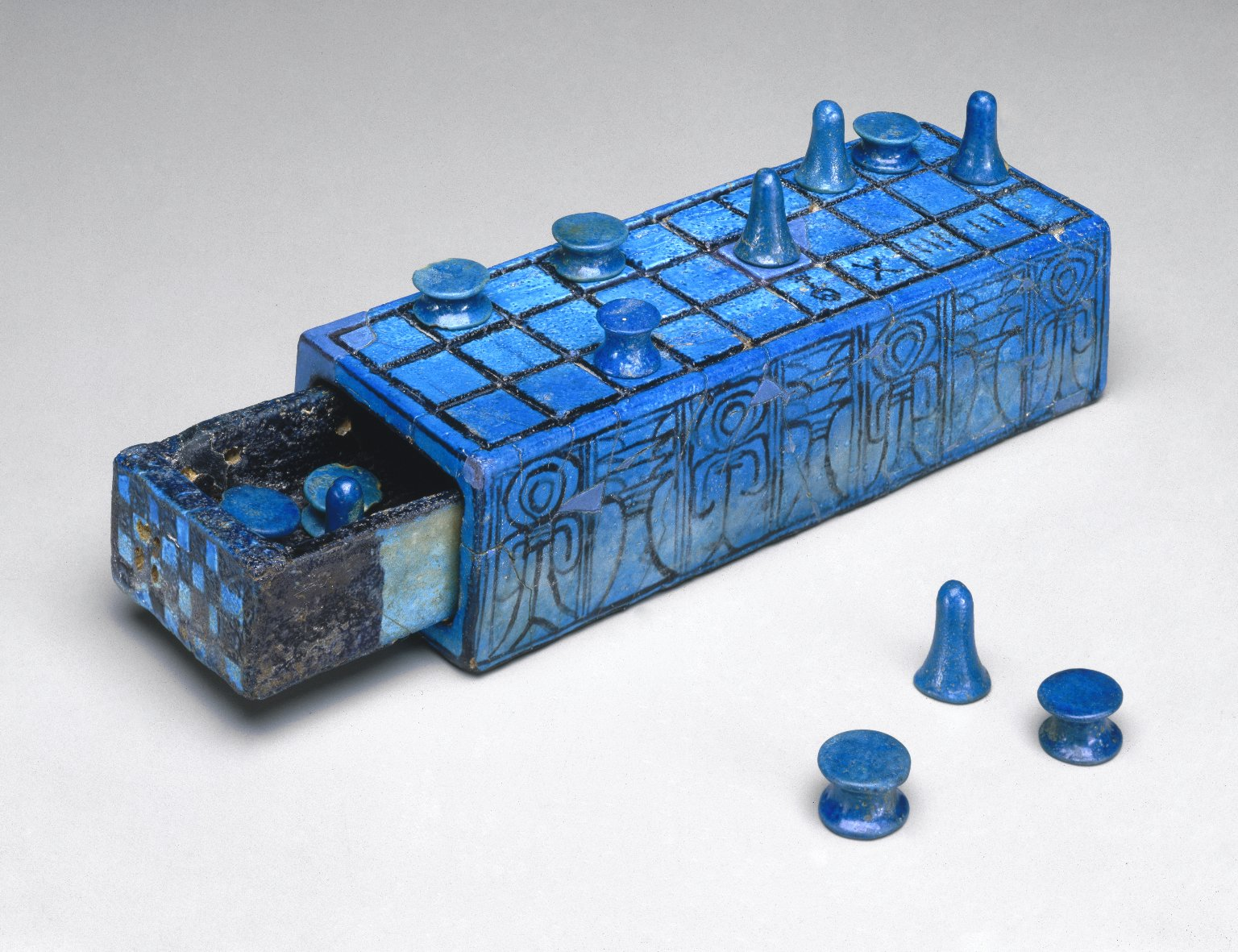
Senet set inscribed with the Horus name of Amenhotep III (r. 1391–1353 BC)

== Luck, strategy, and diplomacy ==
Some games, such as chess, depend completely on player skill, while many children's games, such as Candy Land (1949) and snakes and ladders require no decisions by the players and are decided purely by luck.

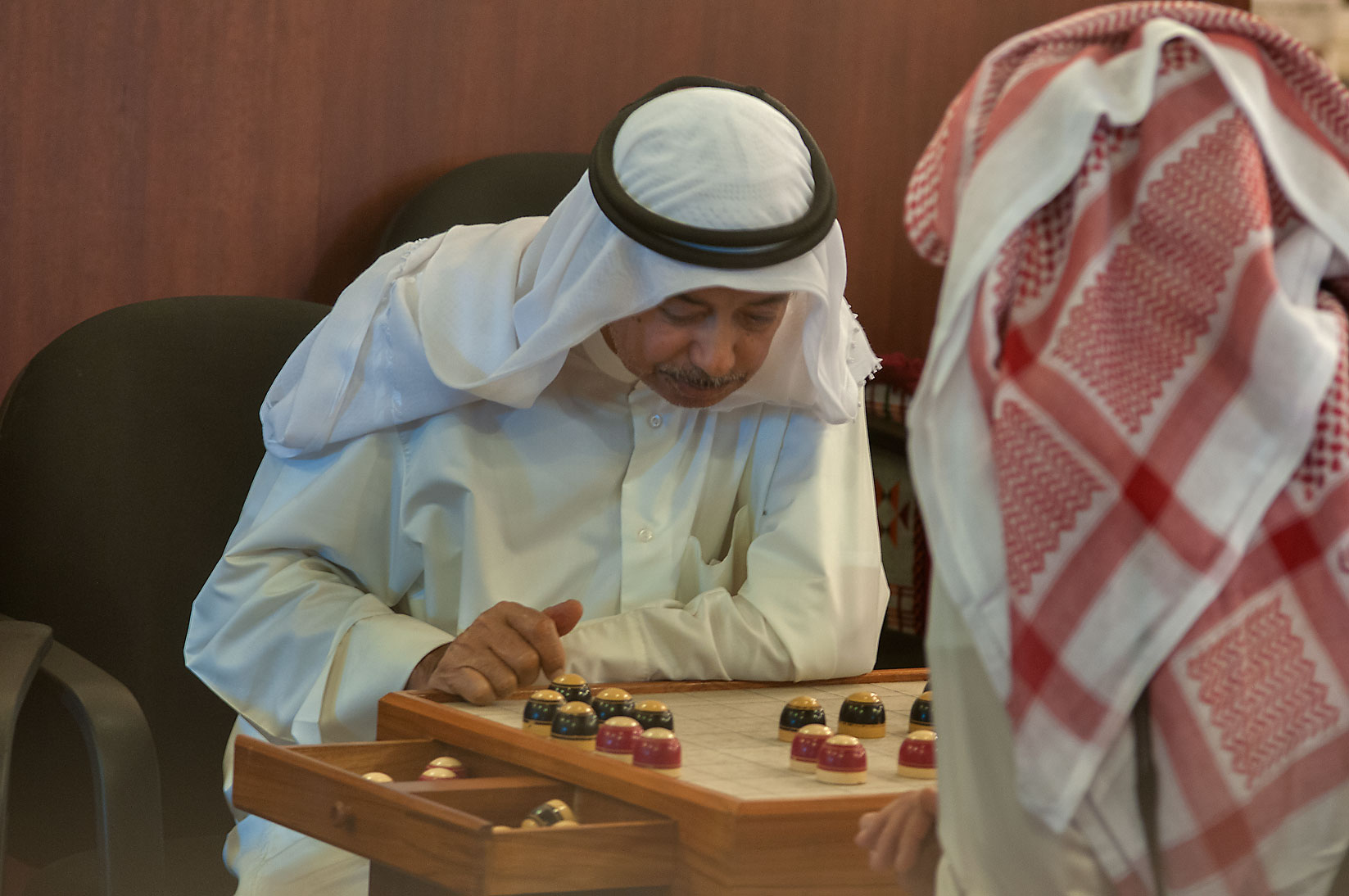
Two Qataris playing the traditional board game of damah

Many games require some level of both skill and luck. A player may be hampered by bad luck in backgammon, Monopoly, or Risk; but over many games, a skilled player will win more often. The elements of luck can also make for more excitement at times, and allow for more diverse and multifaceted strategies, as concepts such as expected value and risk management must be considered.

Luck may be introduced into a game by several methods. The use of dice of various sorts goes back to one of the earliest board games, the Royal Game of Ur. These can decide everything from how many steps a player moves their token, as in Monopoly, to how their forces fare in battle, as in Risk, or which resources a player gains, as in Catan (1995). Other games such as Sorry! (1934) use a deck of special cards that, when shuffled, create randomness. Scrabble (1948) creates a similar effect using randomly picked letters. Other games use spinners, timers of random length, or other sources of randomness. German-style board games are notable for often having fewer elements of luck than many North American board games. Luck may be reduced in favor of skill by introducing symmetry between players. For example, in a dice game such as Ludo (c. 1896), by giving each player the choice of rolling the dice or using the previous player's roll.

Another important aspect of some games is diplomacy, that is, players making deals with one another. Negotiation generally features only in games with three or more players, cooperative games being the exception. An important facet of Catan, for example, is convincing players to trade with you rather than with opponents. In Risk, two or more players may team up against others. Easy diplomacy involves convincing other players that someone else is winning and should therefore be teamed up against. Advanced diplomacy (e.g., in the aptly named game Diplomacy from 1954) consists of making elaborate plans together, with the possibility of betrayal.

In perfect information games, such as chess, each player has complete information on the state of the game, but in other games, such as Tigris and Euphrates (1997) or Stratego (1946), some information is hidden from players. This makes finding the best move more difficult and may involve estimating probabilities by the opponents.

== Software ==
Many board games are now available as video games. These are aptly termed digital board games, and their distinguishing characteristic compared to traditional board games is that they can now be played online against a computer or other players. Some websites (such as boardgamearena.com, yucata.de, etc.) allow play in real time and immediately show the opponents' moves, while others use email to notify the players after each move. The Internet and cheaper home printing have also influenced board games via print-and-play games that may be purchased and printed. Some games use external media such as audio cassettes or DVDs in accompaniment to the game.

There are also virtual tabletop programs that allow online players to play a variety of existing and new board games through tools needed to manipulate the game board, but do not necessarily enforce the game's rules, leaving this up to the players. There are generalized programs such as Vassal, Tabletop Simulator and Tabletopia that can be used to play any board or card game, while programs like Roll20 and Fantasy Grounds are more specialized for role-playing games. Some of these virtual tabletops have worked with the license holders to allow for use of their game's assets within the program; for example, Fantasy Grounds has licenses for both Dungeons & Dragons and Pathfinder materials, while Tabletop Simulator allows game publishers to provide paid downloadable content for their games. However, as these games offer the ability to add in the content through user modifications, there are also unlicensed uses of board game assets available through these programs.

== Market ==
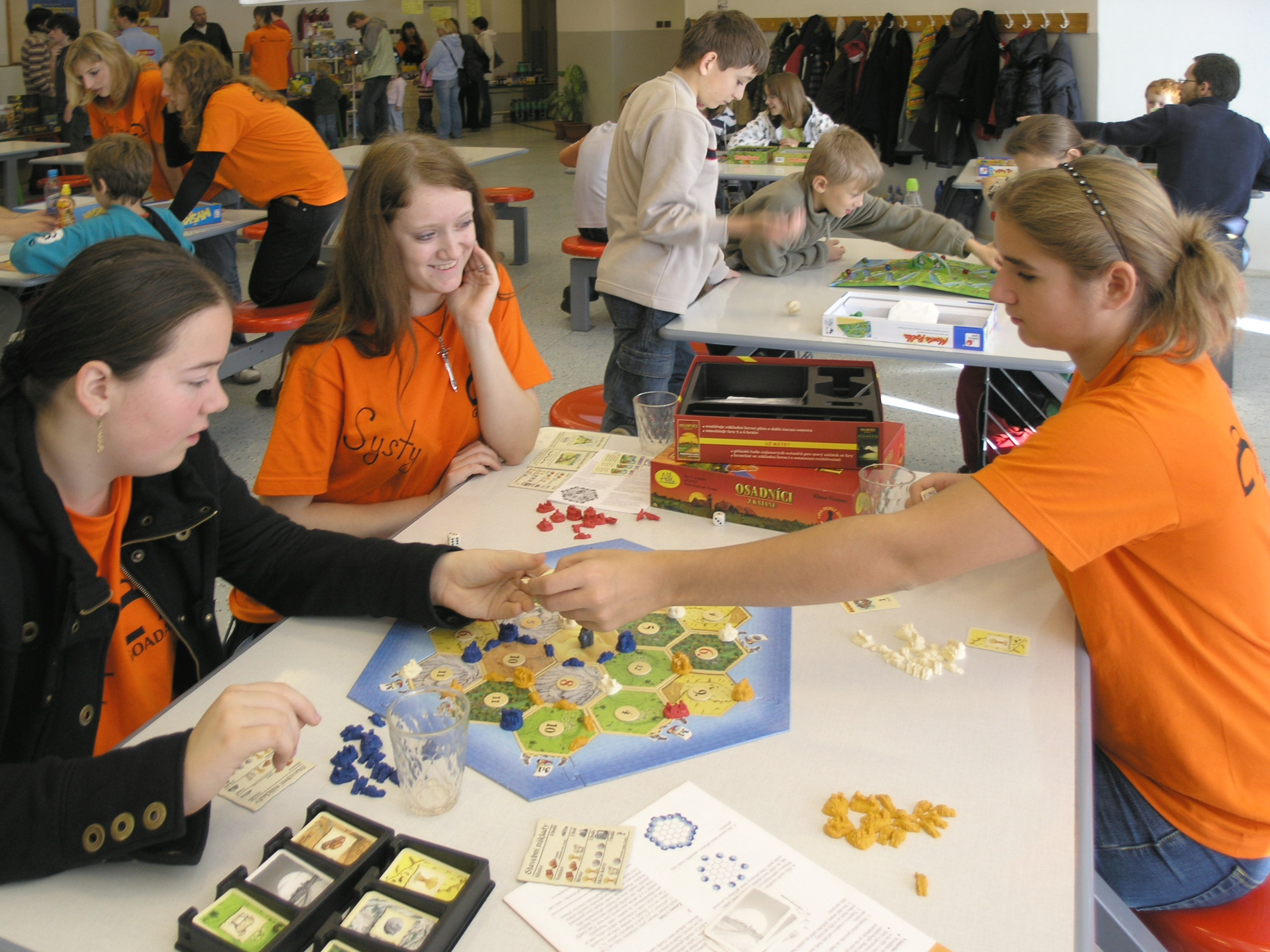
The modern German board game Catan is printed in 30 languages and sold 15 million by 2009.

While the board gaming market is estimated to be smaller than that for video games, it has also experienced significant growth from the late 1990s. A 2012 article in The Guardian described board games as "making a comeback". Other expert sources suggest that board games never went away, and that board games have remained a popular leisure activity which has only grown over time. Another from 2014 gave an estimate that put the growth of the board game market at "between 25% and 40% annually" since 2010, and described the current time as the "golden era for board games". The rise in board game popularity has been attributed to quality improvement (more elegant mechanics, components, artwork, and graphics) as well as increased availability thanks to sales through the Internet. Crowd-sourcing for board games is a large facet of the market, with $233 million raised on Kickstarter in 2020.

A 1991 estimate for the global board game market was over $1.2 billion. A 2001 estimate for the United States "board games and puzzle" market gave a value of under $400 million, and for United Kingdom, of about £50 million. A 2009 estimate for the Korean market was put at 800 million won, and another estimate for the American board game market for the same year was at about $800 million. A 2011 estimate for the Chinese board game market was at over 10 billion yuan. A 2013 estimate put the size of the German toy market at 2.7 billion euros (out of which the board games and puzzle market is worth about 375 million euros), and Polish markets at 2 billion and 280 million zlotys, respectively. In 2009, Germany was considered to be the best market per capita, with the highest number of games sold per individual.

=== Hobby board games ===
Some academics, such as Erica Price and Marco Arnaudo, have differentiated "hobby" board games and gamers from other board games and gamers. A 2014 estimate placed the U.S. and Canada market for hobby board games (games produced for a "gamer" market) at only $75 million, with the total size of what it defined as the "hobby game market" ("the market for those games regardless of whether they're sold in the hobby channel or other channels") at over $700 million. A similar 2015 estimate suggested a hobby game market value of almost $900 million.

== Research ==
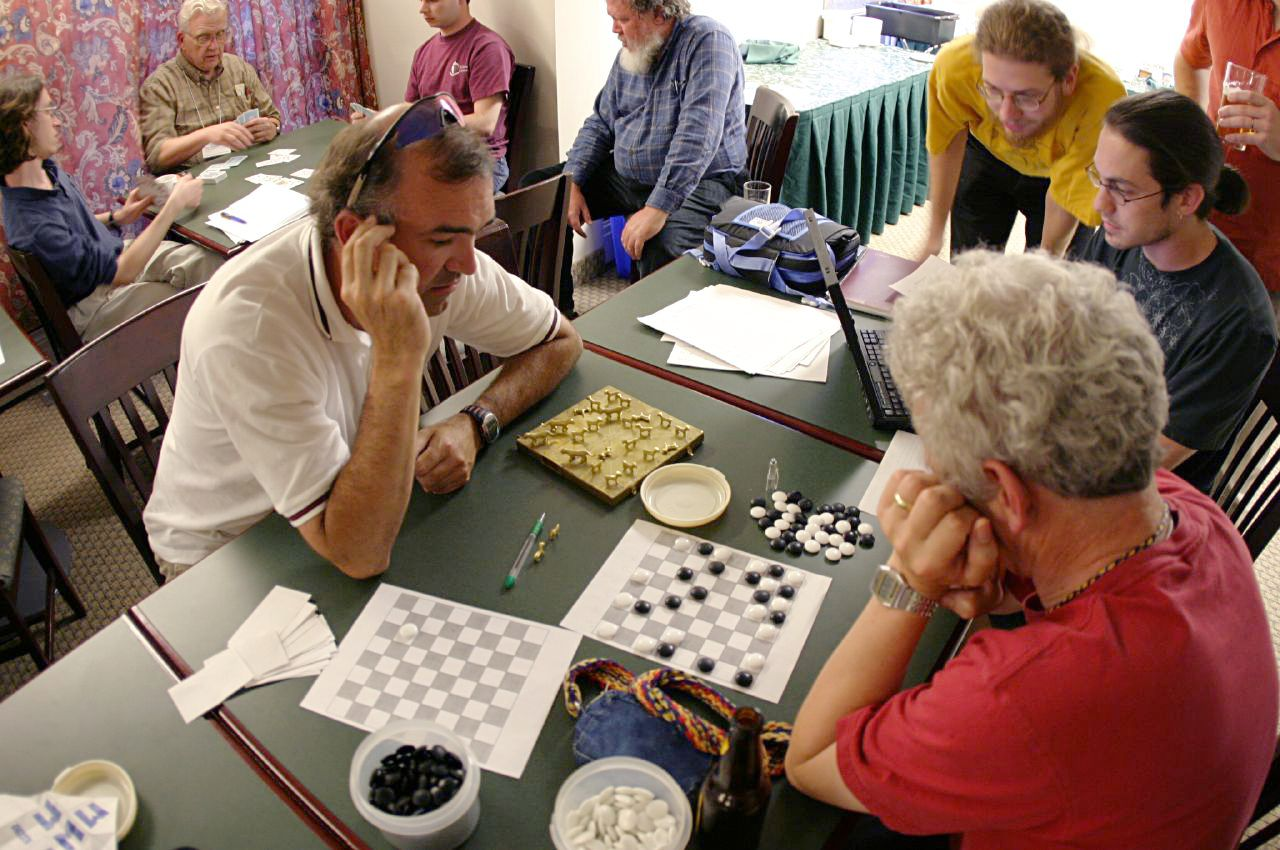
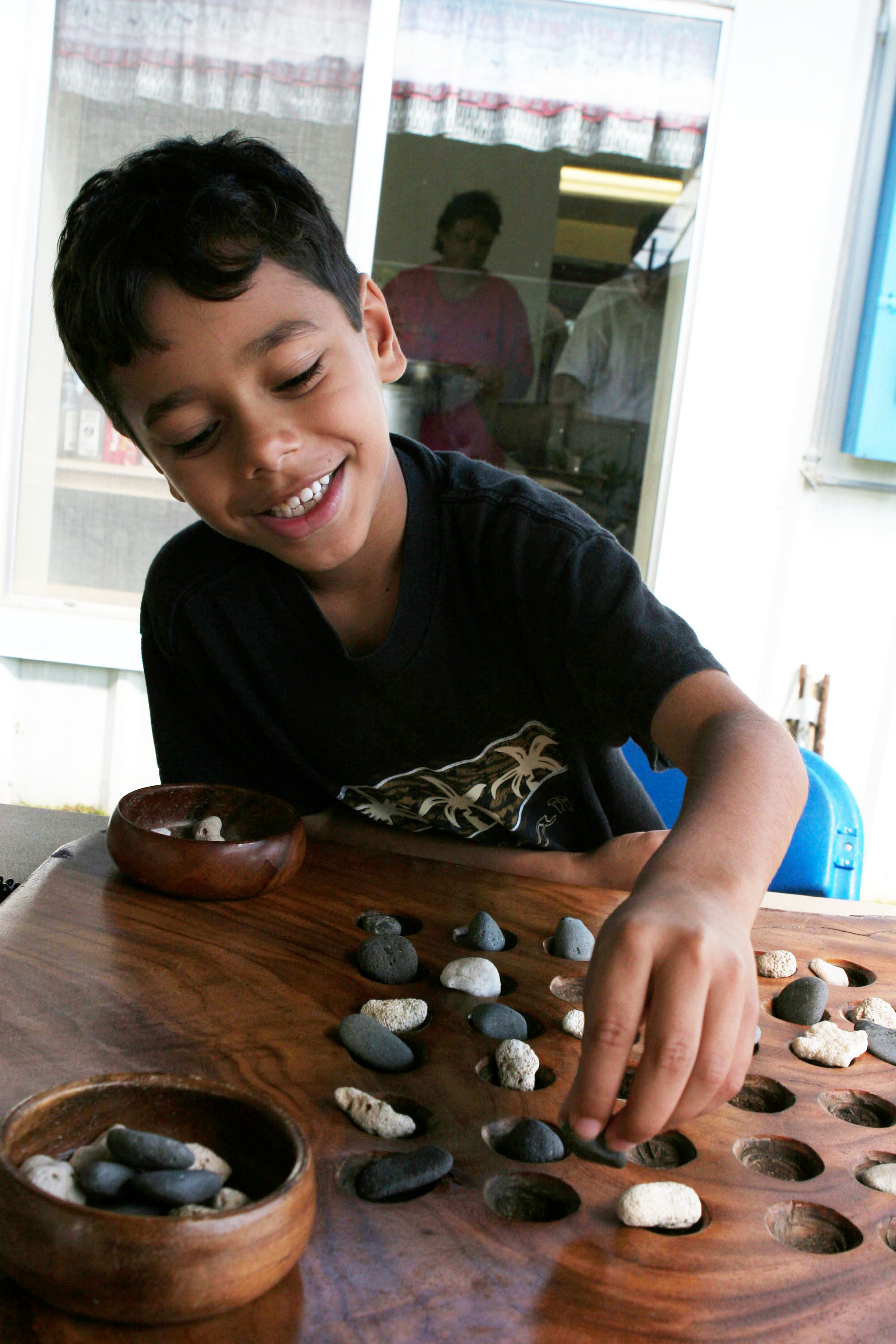
Board games serve diverse interests. Left: kōnane for studious competition. Right: kōnane for lighthearted fun.

A dedicated field of gaming research exists, known as game studies or ludology.

While there has been a fair amount of scientific research on the psychology of older board games (e.g., chess, Go, mancala), less has been done on contemporary board games such as Monopoly, Scrabble, and Risk, and especially modern board games such as Catan, Agricola, and Pandemic. Much research has been carried out on chess, partly because many tournament players are publicly ranked in national and international lists, which makes it possible to compare their levels of expertise. The works of Adriaan de Groot, William Chase, Herbert A. Simon, and Fernand Gobet have established that knowledge, more than the ability to anticipate moves, plays an essential role in chess-playing ability.

Linearly arranged board games have improved children's spatial numerical understanding. This is because the game is similar to a number line in that they promote a linear understanding of numbers rather than the innate logarithmic one.

Research studies show that board games such as Snakes and Ladders result in children showing significant improvements in aspects of basic number skills such as counting, recognizing numbers, numerical estimation, and number comprehension. They also practice fine motor skills each time they grasp a game piece. Playing board games has also been tied to improving children's executive functions and help reduce risks of dementia for the elderly. Related to this is a growing academic interest in the topic of game accessibility, culminating in the development of guidelines for assessing the accessibility of modern tabletop games and the extent to which they are playable for people with disabilities.

Additionally, board games can be therapeutic. Bruce Halpenny, a games inventor, said when interviewed about his game, The Great Train Robbery:

With crime, you deal with every basic human emotion and also have enough elements to combine action with melodrama. The player's imagination is fired as they plan to rob the train. Because of the gamble they take in the early stage of the game, there is a build-up of tension, which is immediately released once the train is robbed. Release of tension is therapeutic and useful in our society because most jobs are boring and repetitive.

Playing games has been suggested as a viable addition to the traditional educational curriculum if the content is appropriate and the gameplay informs students on the curriculum content.

== Categories ==
=== Historical development ===
Harold Murray's A History of Board Games Other Than Chess (1952) has been called the first attempt to develop a "scheme for the classification of board games", in which he separated board games into five categories: "race", "war", "hunt", "alignment" / "configuration", and "mancala" games. Robert Bell's Board and Table Games from Many Civilizations (1960) similarly espoused a classification of board games, this time divided into four categories, "race", "war", "positional", and "mancala" games. In David Parlett's The Oxford History of Board Games (1999), based on the work of Murray and Bell, he described a "classical" categorization of board games which consisted of four primary categories: "race", "space", "chase", and "displace" games.

Modern board games have been classified in a variety of ways, a classification that can be based on the board game's mechanics, theme, age range, player number, and promotion. The diversity of board games means that some games belong to several categories.

=== Mechanics ===
A board game's mechanics usually involve an assessment of a player or player/s achievements while adhering to a series of pre-established rules, i.e. gameplay, such as capturing opponents' pieces, calculation of a final score, or achieving a predefined goal. Board games have a range of rule complexity but also a range of strategic depth, both of which determine the ease of mastering the game, i.e., hard-to-master games like chess possess a relatively simple rule set but have great strategic depth. Examples of categories based on a modern categorization of a board game's mechanics include:

Board game categorization by mechanics
Board game categories	Description	Examples	Ref
Alignment	A subcategory of space board games. In an alignment game, a player is required to position their tokens in an array of a prescribed length. Like space games, these games are often abstract.	Renju; Gomoku; Connect6; Nine men's morris; Tic-tac-toe	
American-style	From the North American region, usually having an emphasis on theme; randomness, usually through dice; numerous ways to win; and direct player conflict. These board games are also called Ameritrash board games; however, this term is not necessarily a negative label.	Betrayal at House on the Hill; Zombicide; Twilight Imperium; Arkham Horror; Talisman	
Auction	Use bidding, a competitive assigning of value to different items, resources, privileges, or game scenarios, as a mechanism by which players attempt to obtain valuable in-game assets or establish a favorable turn order. These board games are also called bidding board games.	Examples include: Biblios; Condottiere; El Grande; For Sale; Hit Z Road; Hoity Toity; The Estates; High Society; Irish Gauge; Isle of Skye; Medici; Power Grid; Skull; Taj Mahal; Ra	
Area control	Have some form of map or board defining a space that players compete to dominate, usually through adding their own pieces to regions or areas or removing their opponents' pieces.	Small World; Risk; Nanty Narking; Blood Rage; Spirit Island; Scythe; even arguably Scrabble	
Bluffing	Involve convincing opponent players on the accuracy of a claim, which includes tricking opponent players into believing something incorrect. All bluffing board games revolve around an element of hidden information.	Blood on the Clocktower; Coup; The Resistance; Sheriff of Nottingham; Skull; Shadows Over Camelot; Enigma Beyond Code; Bacchus' Banquet	
Campaign	Players follow a series of connected scenarios, where the actions and outcome of one scenario will usually affect the next.	Charterstone; Gloomhaven franchise games; Return to Dark Tower; The Ungame	
Chase	Often have an asymmetrical layout, where players start the game with different sets of pieces and objectives, usually rolling one or more dice to move a corresponding number of spaces along a looping track of spaces, or a path with a start and finish. When players land on certain spaces, it triggers specific actions or offers the player certain gameplay options. These board games are also known as roll-and-move games.	Classical: Hnefatafl; Snakes and ladders; Hyena chase Modern: Cluedo; Cranium; Monopoly; The Game of Life; Formula D	
Chess variant	Displacement games that are variations upon the general chess concept.	Traditional: Shogi; Xiangqi; Janggi Modern: Chess960; Grand Chess; Hexagonal chess; Alice Chess	
City building	Involve building and managing a city via planning decisions, in a way that is efficient, powerful, or lucrative.	7 Wonders; The Capitals; Suburbia; Citadels; Catan; Everdell; Life in Reterra; Lisboa; On Mars; Puerto Rico; Underwater Cities	
Civilization building	Involve developing and managing a society of people, often from scratch, requiring the contemplation of long-term strategy, good resource management, and sometimes even conflict with opponents.	7 Wonders; Anno 1800; Civilization; Eclipse; Gaia; Shogun; Through The Ages; Terra Mystica franchise games; Twilight Imperium	
Collectible component	Involve collecting and trading certain game elements, usually cards and miniatures. These games are built around strategy and collection building, but also luck. These board games are also often called building board games.	Magic: The Gathering; Yu-Gi-Oh; Pokémon; KeyForge	
Configuration	A sub-category of space games. However, as opposed to alignment games, the objective of players is to line up their pieces to complete predetermined array targets in a particular order. Like space games, these games are often abstract.	Lines of Action; Hexade; Entropy	
Connection	Often an abstract strategy game, in which players attempt to complete a specific type of connection with their pieces. This could involve forming a path between two or more endpoints, completing a closed loop, or a player connecting all of their pieces so they are adjacent to each other.	TwixT; Hex; Havannah	
Cooperative	The players work together to achieve a common goal rather than competing against each other. Either the players win the game by reaching a predetermined objective, or all players lose the game, often by not reaching the objective before a certain trigger event ends the game. These board games are also called non-competitive or co-op games.	Examples include: Max the Cat; Caves and Claws; Bambino Dino; Endeavor: Deep Sea; Forbidden Island franchise games; Gloomhaven franchise games; Horrified; Mountaineering; Nemesis; Nurturing Game; Pandemic; Spirit Island; There's a Growly in the Garden; The Ungame; Robinson Crusoe; Shadows over Camelot	
Count and capture	Players use tokens in rows of designated positions to capture their opponent's pieces. They are often also called sowing or mancala games.	Examples include: Mancala; Wari; Oware; The Glass Bead Game	
Cross and circle	Race games with a board consisting of a circle divided into four equal portions by a cross inscribed inside it, like four spokes in a wheel.	Examples Cross and circle games that are also included: Yut; Ludo; Aggravation	
Deck-builder	Each player starts with their own identical deck of cards but alters it during play, with more powerful cards being added to the deck and less powerful ones being removed.	Aeon's End; Black Box; Clank! franchise games; Dominion (game); Dune: Imperium; Harry Potter: Hogwarts Battle; Hero Realms; Legendary: A Marvel Deck Building Game; Mystic Vale; Star Realms; Undaunted: Normandy	
Deck construction	Players use different decks of cards to play, constructed before the game from a large pool of options, according to specific rules. This type of board game is also called a trading card board game.	Android: Netrunner; Arkham Horror: The Card Game; Disney Lorcana; Keyforge; Magic: The Gathering; Marvel Champions; Pokémon; Yu-Gi-Oh!	
Deduction	Players form conclusions based on what is occurring or has transpired based on available premises, such as provided clues either by the board game itself or by fellow players. These board games are also called Investigation games. Social deduction board games are a subcategory of deduction board games.	Examples include: Alchemists, Bureau of Investigation: Investigations in Arkham & Elsewhere, Clue; Cryptid, Decrypto, Hanabi, Kryptos, Love Letter, Lord of the Rings: The Confrontation, Mastermind, Scotland Yard; Sherlock Holmes: Consulting Detective, Spectator Ops, Werewolf; Zendo	
Dexterity	Require accurate movements of the body in response to real-time game situations. These games are a particular form of physical board game where fine motor skills are more important than physical attributes such as strength or endurance, including flicking, balancing, or even throwing objects around. Dexterity board games test motor skills, reflexes, and coordination; and reward carefulness and punish clumsiness. These board games are also known as action board games.	Flick 'em Up; Beasts of Balance; Dungeon Fighter; Flip Ships; Ghost Blitz; Jenga; Jungle Speed; Klask; Paku Paku; Pitch Car; Spot It!; Tumblin' Dice; What Next?	
Displacement	The main objective is to capture the opponents' pieces. These board games are also often called elimination or war board games.	Chess; Checkers; Alquerque; Fanorona; Yoté; Surakarta	
Drafting	Involve a mechanism where players are presented with a set of options, usually cards, from which they must pick one, thus choosing the best options from a pool, leaving the remainder for the next player to choose from. They combine strategy, quick decision-making, and outguessing opponent players. The drafting mechanism can be a small part of a game, to select an ability for use during a round, or the entire decision space for a game.	7 Wonders; Blood Rage; Bunny Kingdom; Citadels; Exploding Kittens; Sushi Go!; Ticket to Ride; It's a Wonderful World	
Dungeon-crawler	Players take the roles of characters making their way through a location, often depicted by a map with a square grid or a page in a book, defeating enemies controlled by another player, a companion app, or the game system itself.	Descent; Gloomhaven franchise games; Betrayal at House on the Hill franchise games; HeroQuest; Mansions of Madness; Star Wars: Imperial Assault; Mice and Mystics	
Economic	Players manage resources and make smart decisions about how they spend or invest money. A player's strategy usually revolves around ensuring they have enough resources to achieve a strong financial position. Economic board games usually simulate a market in some way. These games are often also called Economic simulation games. The term economic board game is often used interchangeably with resource management board game.	Examples include: Ark Nova; Brass franchise games; The Business Game; Terra Mystica franchise games; Great Western Trail; Catan; Food Chain Magnate; The Game of Life; Monopoly; Power Grid; Terraforming Mars; Through The Ages; Twilight Imperium	
Educational	Teach new ideas, concepts, topics, or understanding while playing. The board game's learning is based on a particular theme. While educational games exist for different age groups, they are usually designed for children.	The Magic Labyrinth; Brain Quest; Cashflow; Evolution franchise games; Mariposas; Wingspan	
Engine-builder	Involves building an engine, something that takes your starting resources or actions and turns them into more resources, which often eventually accumulate scored points.	Res Arcana; Century; Everdell; Imagnarium; Race for the Galaxy; Splendor; Terraforming Mars; Wingspan	
Euro-style	Have a strategy focus, prioritising limited randomness over theme. These board games usually have competitive interactions between players through passive competition, rather than aggressive conflict, in contrast to the more thematic but chance-driven American-style board games. Euro-style board games are also called Eurogames or German-style board games due to the fact that many of the early games of this style were developed in Germany.	Agricola; Catan; Carcassonne; Decatur; Carson City; Five tribes; Le Havre; Lords of Waterdeep; Montana; Paladins of the West Kingdom; Power Grid; Puerto Rico; Stone Age; Suburbia; Takenoko; Ticket to Ride	
Exploration	Have an unexplored map of tiles or cards, which the game encourages players to explore by flipping them and dealing with the consequences, either beneficial or detrimental. These board games are also often called Travel or 4x games.	Arkham Horror: The Card Game; Betrayal at House on the Hill franchise games; Eclipse; Gloomhaven franchise games; The Lost Expedition; Lost Ruins of Arnak; Robinson Crusoe; Twilight Imperium	
Fighting	Encourage players to engage game characters in close-quarter battles and hand-to-hand combat. They differ from Wargames in that the combat in Wargames exists as one part of a large-scale military simulation, while in Fighting games the focus is on the particular combat scenarios.	Gloomhaven franchise games; Scythe; Spirit Island; War of the Ring	
Guessing	Involve a player, or players, guessing the answer to a question based on clues from another player.	Battleship; Mysterium; Pictionary	
Hidden movement	Feature one or more players who move across the board, unseen to the other players.	Black Sonata; Captain Sonar; City of the Great Machine; Fury of Dracula; Letters from Whitechapel; Mind MGMT; Star Wars Rebellion	
Hidden role	A player, or players, has a hidden role within the group, where the rest of the players have to identify them, avoiding any influence or tricks used to deflect any suspicions that they have those roles. Sometimes called hidden traitor board games.	Mafia; The Resistance franchise games; Werewolf franchise games; Secret Hitler; Betrayal at House on the Hill franchise games	
Legacy	A sub-category of campaign board games, with players following a series of connected scenarios, where the actions and outcome of one scenario will usually affect the next. However, in legacy board games, a player's choices and actions cause permanent, often physical, changes to the game and its components, such as applying stickers to the board or tearing up cards, thus providing a one-time experience.	Betrayal Legacy; Charterstone; Gloomhaven franchise games; Jurassic World: The Legacy of Isla Nublar; Pandemic Legacy; Ticket to Ride: Legands of the West	
Math	Explicitly require players to use mathematical knowledge and concepts to achieve game objectives, thereby testing each player's number skills. These games combine mathematical skills, such as calculations, with regular game structures, such as sources of randomness.	Lost Cities; Sentient; The Shipwreck Arcana; Turning Machine; Prime Club; Qwixx; Math Fluxx	
Maze and labyrinth	Often require players to navigate a series of complex pathways that are located on the game board. This type of board game tests a player's spatial awareness and problem-solving skills, often while adding in design elements from other types of board games.	Burgle Bros; RoboRally; Labyrinth; Magic Maze; Sub Terra; Ricochet Robots; The Magic Labyrinth	
Memory	Concerns memorizing certain facts, figures, and other information while testing a player's ability to recall sequences, locations, or specific items.	Codenames; Confusion; Cortex + Challenge; Enigma: Beyond code; Hanabi; The Magic Labyrinth; Memory; That's not a hat; The Resistance franchise games; Sideshow Swap; Simon; Wandering Towers; Whitehall Mystery; Witness	
Moral and spiritual development	Prioritise player moral and spiritual development above any technical process of establishing a winner and loser.	Transformation Game; Mansion of Happiness; or Psyche's Key	
Negotiation	Players must persuade fellow players to make deals and alliances or even offer bribes to get ahead in the game. The only exceptions to this are often Euro games, which have stringent resource management rules.	Ca$h' n Guns; Cosmic Encounter; Diplomacy; Hegemony; The Resistance franchise games; Rising Sun; Sheriff of Nottingham; Twilight Imperium; Paydirt; Pax franchise games	
Number	Players are required to use or manipulate numbers to achieve the game's objectives.	That's Pretty Clever! franchise games; Arboretum; Take 5; The Shipwreck Arcana	
Paper-and-pencil	Can be played solely with writing implements, usually without erasing. They may be played to pass the time, as icebreakers, or for brain training.	Dots and boxes; Hangman; MASH; Paper soccer; Spellbinder; Sprouts; Tic-tac-toe	
Party	Encourage social interaction. They are designed for larger groups of players with the aim of fostering social interaction amongst players, thus combining humour, creativity, and social interaction.	Classic: Charades; Pictionary Modern: Blood on the Clocktower; Codenames; Concept; Dixit; Decrypto; Just One; Mysterium; The Resistance franchise games; Secret Hitler; Snake Oil; Telestrations; Time's Up; Werewolf franchise games	
Physical	Involve physical challenges, and fall into two sub-categories: Dexterity board games Those focusing on fine motor skills of a player's fingers, including flicking, balancing, or even throwing objects around. Physical skill board games Those focusing on gross motor skills by utilising a player's whole body movement.	Camp Granada; Flick 'em Up; Beasts of Balance; Dungeon Fighter; Flip Ships; Ghost Blitz; Jenga; Jungle Speed; Klask; Paku Paku; Pitch Car; Spot It!; Tumblin' Dice; What Next?	
Physical skill	Involve challenges involving gross motor skills, through assigning whole body movement tasks to players.	Camp Granada	
Position	The object is not to capture, but to win by leaving the opponent player unable to make a move.	Kōnane; Mū tōrere; L game	
Push-your-luck	Invite you to take ever bigger risks to achieve increasingly valuable rewards against the risk of significant loss. These board games are also called press-your-luck board games.	Biblios; Formula D; The Captain is Dead: Dangerous Planet; King of Tokyo; The Quacks of Quedlinburg; Port Royale; Deep Sea Adventure; Welcome to the Dungeon	
Puzzle	Based on the solving of a puzzle or mystery, and are commonly single-player games.	Classic: Peg solitaire; Sudoku Modern: Azul; Bärenpark; Blokus; Exit: The Game; Patchwork; Ubongo; Unlock!	
Race	Each player has the goal of being the player to finish first, either by moving all their pieces to the final destination or completing an objective, e.g., the first player to collect five gems. This also includes games where the objective is to be the first to reach a checkpoint by navigation or steering around obstacles, usually by having greater speed or control than your opponents. The basic requirement is that race mechanics be an operative mechanism; however, racing is not required to be part of the board game's theme.	Classic: Agon; Pachisi; Backgammon; Chaupar; Chinese checkers; The bottle game; Dogs and jackals; Five-field kono; Grasshopper; Halma; Hyena chase; Kerala; Liubo; Ludo; Ludus duodecim scriptorum; Mehen; Nyout; Pachisi; Patolli; Royal Game of Ur; Salta; Saturankam; Senet; T'shu-p'u; Chowka bhara; Kilkenny Cats; Game of the goose; Zohn ahl Modern: Camel Up; Downforce and Rallyman: GT; Flamme Rouge; Formula D; Istanbul; Long Shot: The Dice Game; Montana; Heat: Pedal to the Metal; The Quest for El Dorado; Snow Tails; Thunder Road franchise games	
Role-playing	Players assume a fictional character identity to participate in the game and its narrative. These games combine the character development and narrative of classic role-playing games with the mechanics of a board game.	Arcadia Quest; Dungeons & Dragons; Gloomhaven franchise games; Mage Knight; Mice and Mystics; Pathfinder; Shadowrun; Sword and Sorcery; Vampire: The Masquerade	
Real-time	Have time limitations, usually playing against a timer, necessitating quick decision-making under pressure. In some real-time games, players take their turns simultaneously, creating a fast-paced, chaotic environment.	Captain Sonar; Galaxy Trucker; Pendulum; Space Alert; Speed chess; XCOM: The Board Game	
Resource management	The aim is to achieve objectives and gain an advantage through players acquiring, using, and managing a set of resources, which can be anything from physical materials, currency, and points to abstract concepts like time or influence.	Everdell; Imperial Settlers; Concordia; Scythe	
Roll-and-write	Players roll dice and decide how to use the outcome, writing it into a personal scoring sheet. Each decision impacts a player's options for the rest of the game, so even in games where everyone uses the same dice, slightly different choices at the start can lead to very different results. Some games replace dice rolls with card exposure or the writing with miniature-based roll-and-build.	Bargain Basement Bathysphere; Corinth; Railroad Ink; Twilight Imperium; That's Pretty Clever! franchise games; Yahtzee	
Running-fight	Combine the movement of race games to eliminate opponent player pieces, like in chess or checkers.	Examples of Running-fight games that are also board games include: Bul	
Share-buying	Players buy stakes in each other's positions. These board games are typically longer economic-management games.	Acquire or Panamax	
Social deduction	One or more players have a secret that the rest of the players need to figure out. Often, players are secretly assigned roles known only to them and must achieve their own objectives, commonly either establishing the odd one out or hiding the fact that they are the odd one out. These board games generally involve deceit, bluffing, and accusations.	Blood on the Clocktower; Werewolf franchise games; The Resistance; Secret Hitler; Unfathomable	
Space	The objective is for players to line up their pieces to complete predetermined array targets. Space board games fall into one of the following sub-categories: Alignment board games The goal of an alignment board game is to create a line of tokens of a prescribed length. Configuration board games The goal of a configuration board game is to create a line of tokens of a prescribed length in a particular order.	Connect6; Entropy; Gomoku; Hexade; Lines of Action; Nine men's morris; Noughts and crosses; Renju; Tic-tac-toe	
Storytelling	There is a focus on narrative and description that is directed or fully created by the players. This can be an overarching story lasting the whole game, or across a campaign of multiple sessions, read from pre-written passages, or a sequence of vignettes tasking players with inventing and describing something. Story-telling board games often test a player's creativity, improvisation, and sometimes acting skills.	Examples of story-telling games that are also board games include: Betrayal at House on the Hill; Dixit; Fog of Love; The King's Dilemma; Once Upon a Time; Tales of the Arabian Nights	
Stacking	Players physically stacking and balancing game pieces.	Examples of stacking games that are also board games include: Boom Blast Stix; Bamboleo; Paku Paku; Animal Upon Animal; Junk Art; Jenga; Beasts of Balance; Lasca; Meeple Circus; Riff Raff; Rhino Hero; DVONN	
Territory building	Players establish or gain control over a specific area. These games often use area majority mechanics, also known as influence or enclosure mechanics, where areas are created as the game progresses.	The Castles of Burgundy; Faust; Terra Mystica franchise games; Go; Reversi; Risk; Scythe; Spirit Island; Terraforming Mars; War of the Ring	
Trivia	Test a player's ability to recall trivia facts. Many are based on a simple design that revolves around a deck of cards with questions.	Articulate!; Blockbuster: The Game; Fuana; Hipster; Half-Truth; Linkee!; Smart10; Timeline franchise games; Trivial Pursuit; Wits and Wagers	
Unequal forces	Any game whose core mechanics involve one player who is playing against all the other players right from the start, or at least changes their allegiance, usually pledging it to the dark side. These board games are also known as hunt or one vs many board games.	Betrayal at House on the Hill; fox and geese; Fury of Dracula; Not Alone; Shadows Over Camelot; Tablut	
Word	Involve the competitive use of language, testing each player's vocabulary, creative thinking skills, spelling, or ability to quickly come up with words, phrases, or sentences.	Anagrams; Boggle; So Clover!; Codenames; Decrypto; Bananagrams; Just One; Paperback; Scrabble	
Worker-placement	Actions are taken by assigning worker tokens, from a player's allocated allotment, on designated game board spaces, which trigger specific actions, like collecting resources or completing tasks. Such board games are more commonly Euro-style board games, which concentrate on player interaction. Actions one player has taken often can not be taken by or come with a cost for other players.	Agricola; Charterstone; Caverna; Caylus; Dune: Imperium; Everdell; A Feast for Odin; Keyflower; Lords of Waterdeep; Ora et Labora; Stone Age; Tōkaidō; Village	
Wargame	Strategy-based board games with a war theme. Their mechanics are also closely tied to simulate battles, either fictional or historical, within differing settings, e.g., Napoleonic Wars, World War II, or even Mars. Players pit armies against each other, represented by collections of miniatures or tokens on a map, with a grid or actual measured distances for movement. Players are required to eliminate the opponent's figures or achieve objectives to win, with combat usually dictated by dice rolls or card play. This type of game has three subcategories: Tactical Tactical wargame board games depict a skirmish, battle, or series of battles, using smaller-scale units and maps that depict a battleground that is a few miles or less in size. Operational Operational wargame board games cover a broader scope of military actions, greater than single battles. These may cover an entire smaller war, or a series of operations, or even a campaign within a greater war. Strategic Strategic wargame board games usually recreate a major war on a large scale. Typically, units in such a game will be corps or army level; however, in the monster wargame, divisions and even smaller units can be depicted.	Examples include: Axis & Allies; Cry Havoc; Dune: Imperium; Inis, Kings of War; Memoir '44; Risk; Root; Star Wars: Armada; Scythe; Twilight Imperium; Undaunted: Normandy; Warhammer	

=== Theme ===
Parlett also distinguishes between abstract and thematic games, the latter having a specific genre or frame narrative, for example, regular chess versus Star Wars-themed chess. The board games often have themes that emulate concepts in real-life situations or fictional scenarios, but can also have no evident theme.

Such games have come under criticism, usually when trending thematic concepts, such as those based on popular television show licenses, have been used to supplement deficiencies in the game mechanics. When discussing this practice, Edwards wrote, "A bad game, however, remains a bad game even if it has been themed to a favorite television show." Parlett went so far as to describe these promotional and television spin-off games as being "of an essentially trivial, ephemeral, mind-numbing, and ultimately soul-destroying degree of worthlessness".

The prominent themes found in board games of the Golden Era included: travel, sports, courtship, racism, city life, war, education and capitalist enterprise". Common modern thematic game categories include:

Thematic categorization of board games
Board game genres	Description	Examples	Ref
Adventure	An adventure-themed board game has themes of heroism, exploration, and puzzle-solving, often involving the game characters in quests. The storylines for these types of games often make them fantasy board games.	Gloomhaven franchise games; Nemesis; Clank! franchise games; Arkham Horror: The Card Game	
Abstract strategy	An abstract strategy game is a game where player decisions, rather than random elements, determine the outcome. These games are combinatorial, meaning they provide perfect information rather than hidden or imperfect information, and rely on neither physical dexterity nor non-deterministic elements like shuffled cards or dice rolls during gameplay. Nearly all abstract strategy games are designed for two players or teams taking a finite number of alternating turns. Most games in this category are themeless or have minimal themes and typically lack narrative elements.	Examples of abstract strategy games that are also board games include: Classical: Chess; Checkers; Go; Reversi; Tafl games Modern: Abalone; Arimaa; Blokus; Dameo; All games in the GIPF Project series; Hive; Onitama; Pylos; Quarto; Quoridor; Santorini; Stratego; Tak; Tigris and Euphrates; YINSH	
Animal	Animal-themed games involve animals as a major component of the theme or gameplay, often requiring players to attend to their management or control. Players can even be required to take on the role of animals in the game.	Ark Nova; Great Western Trail; Root; Wingspan; Everdell	
Arabian	Arabian-themed board games are generally fantasy or adventure games that are set in, or inspired by, locations on the Arabian Peninsula of the Middle East, the Persian Gulf, or North/East Africa, including themes and imagery such as deserts, palaces, camels, jewels, and oases, etc.	Five Tribes; Targui; Camel Up; Wayfarers of the South Tigris; Through the Desert	
Environmental	Environmental-themed games have themes and storylines regarding environmental conservation and management.	Pandemic Legacy; Ark Nova; Terraforming Mars; Spirit Island; Barrage; Cascadia; Endeavor: Deep Sea	
Civil War	Civil war-themed board games have storylines concerning a violent battle for government control between two more groups from the same country. The majority of Civil War games are also categorized as wargame board games.	Star Wars: Rebellion; Sekigahara: The Unification of Japan; Fire in the Lake; Pax franchise games; Caesar!: Seize Rome in 20 Minutes!; Resist!	
Climbing	A climbing-themed board game is one thematically related to mountaineering or scaling a similarly steep surface, including a wall.	K2; Mountaineering; Climb!; Summit; Mountaineers	
Fantasy	A fantasy-themed board game is one whose themes and scenarios exist in a fictional world, where magic and other supernatural forms are a primary element of the plot, theme, or setting.	Fantasy games include: Clank! franchise games; Gloomhaven franchise games; Shadows Over Camelot; Spirit Island; War of the Ring	
Farming	A farming-themed game, usually a turn-based game revolving around building farms, growing crops, and raising livestock.	Agricola; Caverna; A Feast for Odin; Puerto Rico; Tzolk'in: The Mayan Calendar; Viticulture	
Flight	Flight-themed board games have themes concerned with mechanical flight, including planes, helicopters, and gliders, etc.	Sky Team; Star Wars: X-Wing Miniatures Game; Pan Am; The Manhattan Project; Star Wars: X-Wing Second Edition; Airlines Europe	
Industry and manufacturing	Industry / manufacturing-themed games encourage players to build, manage, or operate tools and machinery to manufacture raw materials into goods and products. Many industry / manufacturing-themed games are economic games.	Brass franchise games; Terraforming Mars; A Feast for Odin; Barrage; Food Chain Magnate	
Historical simulation	A historical simulation board game is a game that attempts to create a realistic model of a historical event, battle, or encounter. The game uses rules and other ludic elements to construct meaning about the event, and players can use these elements to interpret the game in specific ways. Common periods of history which have provided themes for board games include: General; Before 4000 BC Prehistoric; 3000 BC–476 Ancient; 476–1492 Medieval; 1380–1590 Renaissance; 1500–1690 Pike and Shot; 1690–1789 Age of Reason; 1600–1800 American Indian Wars; 1775–1783 American Revolutionary War; 1789–1815 Napoleonic; 1815–1914 Post-Napoleonic; 1861–1865 American Civil War; 1850–1900 American Old West; 1914–1918 World War I; 1939–1945 World War II; 1945–present Modern warfare; 1945–1975 Vietnam Wars; 1950–1953 Korean War	General: Through The Ages or History of the World Before 4000 BC Prehistoric: Dominant Species; Stone Age; Paleo; Endless Winter: Paleoamericans; Evolution franchise games, or Oceans 3000 BC–476 Ancient: 7 Wonders Duel; Concordia franchise games; Lost Ruins of Arnak; Tzolk'in: The Mayan Calendar; Teotihuacan: City of Gods 476–1492 Medieval: The Castles of Burgundy; A Feast for Odin; Orléans; The Quacks of Quedlinburg; Paladins of the West Kingdom; El Grande 1380–1590 Renaissance: Azul; El Grande; Splendor; Keyflower; Lorenzo il Magnifico; Rajas of the Ganges 1500–1690 Pike and Shot: Sekigahara: The Unification of Japan; Merchants & Marauders; Here I Stand; Pax Renaissance; Wallenstein 1690–1789 Age of Reason: Brass franchise games; Rococo; Maria; Newton; Saint Petersburg; Imperial Struggle 1600–1800 American Indian Wars: A Few Acres of Snow; Wilderness War; Wendake; 1812: The Invasion of Canada; Navajo Wars; Wooden Ships and Iron Men 1775–1783 American Revolutionary War: Imperial Struggle; 1775: Rebellion; Washington's War; Liberty or Death: The American Insurrection; Wooden Ships and Iron Men; Sails of Glory 1789–1815 Napoleonic: Commands & Colors: Napoleonics; Napoleon's Triumph; 1812: The Invasion of Canada, or Manoeuvre 1815–1914 Post-Napoleonic: Brass franchise games; Pax Pamir; Obsession; Trickerion: Legends of Illusion; Carnegie 1861–1865 American Civil War: Freedom: The Underground Railroad; Battle Cry; For the People; The Civil War 1861-1865; A House Divided 1850–1900 American Old West: Great Western Trail; Western Legends; Lewis & Clark: The Expedition; Boonlake; Colt Express 1914–1918 World War I: Memoir '44; Paths of Glory; The Grizzled; Wings of War: Famous Aces; Quartermaster General: 1914; Wings of War: First World War Series 1939–1945 World War II: Axis & Allies; Undaunted: Normandy; Memoir '44; Combat Commander: Europe; Air, Land, & Sea; Blitzkrieg!: World War Two in 20 Minutes; Black Orchestra Modern Warfare: Twilight Struggle; This War of Mine: The Board Game; Captain Sonar; Fire in the Lake; Labyrinth: The War on Terror, 2001–?; COIN franchise games 1945–1975 Vietnam Wars: Downtown: Air War Over Hanoi, 1965-1972; Fields of Fire franchise games; Fire in the Lake; Phantom Leader; Vietnam 1965-1975 1950–1953 Korean War: Fields of Fire franchise games; The Korean War: June 1950-May 1951; Korea: The Forgotten War; Flight Leader; The Speed of Heat	
Horror	A horror-themed game contains themes and imagery depicting morbid topics that are associated with fear, terror, or dread, often also including supernatural elements.	Examples of horror games that are also board game include: Arkham Horror; AuZtralia; Betrayal at House on the Hill; Cthulhu: Death May Die; Dead Man's Cabal; Dead of Winter; Eldritch Horror; Horrified; Texas Chainsaw Massacre: Slaughterhouse; Legendary Encounters: An Alien Deck Building Game; Mansions of Madness; Mysterium; Nyctophobia; Shadow Hunters; The Thing franchise games; Werewolf franchise games; Unmatched: Cobble and Fog; Unfathomable; Zombicide	
Mafia	Mafia-themed board games have themes, narratives, or scenarios related to organized criminal groups.	The Godfather: Corleone's Empire; Ca$h 'n Guns; Scarface; Sons of Anarchy: Men of Mayhem; La Cosa Nostra	
Medical	Medical-themed board games often can have elements of surgery, cures, recovery/recuperation/physical therapy, psychiatry, pharmaceutical prescription, and other medicine-related matters.	Pandemic franchise games or Unconscious Mind	
Murder mystery	Murder mystery-themed board games are board games that often involve deduction or social deduction board games, where players investigate an unsolved murder, or murders, determining the criminal details or perpetrators.	Mansions of Madness; Blood on the Clocktower; Sherlock Holmes Consulting Detective; Deception: Murder in Hong Kong	
Musical	Musical board games are thematically linked to music, bands or the music industry.	Battle of the Bands; Cranium Pop 5; DropMix; Game that Song; Hitster; Humm Bug; Encore; Lacrimosa; Melody Infidelody; On Tour; Spontuneous; Schrille Stille ; Timeline: Music & Cinema	
Mythology	Mythology-themed board games are those that incorporate a thematic narrative that defines how the game world or characters came into existence, especially those related or based on narratives of ancient civilizations. The storylines usually include supernatural elements, e.g., gods, goddesses, and demigods, and are sometimes even set in a fabled or primordial time, which usually corresponds to a general corpus of folk stories (myths) that used to have some form of religious or sacred nature for the cultures focused on in the game.	Spirit Island; The Crew: Mission Deep Sea; Blood Rage; Oathsworn: Into the Deepwood; Mansions of Madness; Tzolk'in: The Mayan Calendar	
Nautical	Nautical-themed board games involve sailors, ships, or maritime navigation as a major component of the theme or gameplay, often requiring players to effectively control ships as an objective.	Concordia; The Crew: Mission Deep Sea; Underwater Cities; Sleeping Gods; Maracaibo; Le Havre	
Other media	These are board games thematically linked, derived, or inspired by works or franchises in other media sources, including: Comic book / Strips; Novels; Video games; Movies / Television / Radio	Comic books: Marvel Champions: The Card Game; Legendary: A Marvel Deck Building Game; Marvel United; Splendor: Marvel (all based on the Marvel Universe); Mind MGMT: The Psychic Espionage "Game" (based on MIND MGMT); Novels: Dune: Imperium (based on the Dune novels); War of the Ring; The Lord of the Rings: Duel for Middle-earth (both based on The Lord of the Rings novels); Arkham Horror: The Card Game; Cthulhu: Death May Die (both based on the Cthulhu Mythos created in the novels by H. P. Lovecraft); Video games: Mechs vs. Minions (based on League of Legends); Slay the Spire: The Board Game (based on Slay the Spire); This War of Mine: The Board Game (based on This War of Mine); Railways of the World (based on Railroad Tycoon); Hanamikoji; Anno 1800 (based on Anno 1800)	
Pirate	A pirate-themed game has characters, themes, or storylines of nautical robbery or criminal violence, including treasure hunting, sea robbery, swords and cannons, swashbuckling, and ship racing, etc. Pirate board games are usually thematically set between the 14th and 20th centuries.	Maracaibo; Skull King; Forgotten Waters; Merchants & Marauders; Dead Reckoning; Libertalia: Winds of Galecrest	
Political	Political-themed board games encourage players to use their character's authority to manipulate societal activities and policy.	Twilight Imperium; Dune: Imperium; Twilight Struggle; Pax franchise games; Hegemony: Lead Your Class to Victory	
Religion	Religious-themed games feature elements of their narrative, setting, or characters that relate to current belief systems or religions of the world, either in their historical aspect and development through time, or their actual objects of faith, like sacred scriptures and articles of doctrine.	Here I Stand; Biblios; Orléans; Ora et Labora; Pax Renaissance; The Pillars of the Earth	
Science fiction	Science fiction-themed board games often have themes relating to imagined possibilities in the sciences. Such games need not be futuristic, or they can be based on an alternative past.	Twilight Imperium; Dune: Imperium; Terraforming Mars; Star Wars: Rebellion; Gaia Project	
Space exploration	Space exploration-themed board games have storylines relating to travel and adventure in outer space. Often, players must seek and gather resources and territories as objectives of the game. These board games are also simply called Space games.	Alien: The Role Playing Game; Black Angel; The Crew (card game); Ganymede; High Frontier franchise game; Kepler-3042; Pulsar 2849; Race for the Galaxy; Space Base; Star Wars: Outer Rim; Starship Samurai; Terraforming Mar	
Spies / secret agents	A spies / secret agents-themed board games often have themes or storylines relating to espionage. A common premise is that players must identify another player who has taken the role of spy or secret agent, in an attempt to reveal that player's allotted information. Since many Spies / Secret Agents-themed board games have an element of hidden information, they are often also categorized as bluffing or deduction board games.	Pax franchise game; Pandemic Legacy; Decrypto; Battlestar Galactica: The Board Game; Codenames; Sherlock Holmes Consulting Detective	
Sports	Sports-themed board games have themes or storylines related to the physical activity of sports, including football and racing (whether car, boat, bicycle, or horse), etc.	Heat: Pedal to the Metal; Flamme Rouge; Long Shot: The Dice Game; Blood Bowl; Downforce; Ready Set Bet	
Train	Train board games are those concerned with building and managing railway routes. They often combine elements from many other game types, requiring the use of strategy, planning, and economic skills to gain an advantage over other players.	Ticket to Ride franchise games; 18xx; Railways of the World; Colt Express; Age of Steam; TransAmerica	
Travel	Travel-themed board games are travel-themed board games where the objective is to move to and from different geographic locations. Travel games usually employ a map as the main feature of the game board.	Lost Ruins of Arnak; Orléans; Lost Ruins of Arnak; The Voyages of Marco Polo; Darwin's Journey; Tainted Grail: The Fall of Avalon; Eldritch Horror	
Transportation	Transportation-themed board games are those that have gameplay involving the movement of goods or people from one place to another.	Brass franchise games; Keyflower; Age of Steam; Xia: Legends of a Drift System; Railways of the World	
Zombie	Zombie-themed board games often contain themes and imagery concerning the animated dead, including common storylines, themes of an apocalypse, horror, and fighting. These games are a thematic sub-category of Horror-themed board games.	Dead of Winter; Dawn of the Zeds; Zombicide; Zombie Kidz Evolution	

=== Components ===
Board games can also be categorized by their components, including:

Board game categorization by components
Board game audience	Description	Examples	Ref
Dice	Dice board games are those that use dice as their sole or principal component.	Example of dice games that are also board games, include: The Castles of Burgundy; King of Tokyo franchise games; Oathsworn: Into the Deepwood; Sky Team; Too Many Bones; Troyes; The Voyages of Marco Polo; Roll for the Galaxy	
Book	Book board games are those where a book is a major operative component, and can be separated into two types: Supplement A book is used as a repository for game designs and rules, which are applied to common gaming equipment, i.e., a checkered board, paper and pencil, cards, dominoes, dice, etc. Narrative A book is a board game's operative mechanism, involving storytelling, dice rolling, or a "multiple-choice paragraph system".	Gaslands; Four Against Darkness; Frostgrave; Spire's End; Ace of Aces franchise games	
Card	Card board games are those where cards are the sole or central mechanism of the game. There are two types: Stand-alone In stand-alone card board games, all the cards necessary for gameplay are purchased at once. Collectible In collectible card board games, players purchase either "starter" or "booster" card packs to compile an increasingly more powerful deck with which to compete.	7 Wonders Duel; Anno 1800; Arkham Horror: The Card Game; Citadels; The Crew franchise games; Everdell; Splendor; Through the Ages: A Story of Civilization; Wingspan	
Electronic	Electronic board games are those that have an electronic apparatus as the central component of the game, such as circuitry or sometimes simple computers. Electronic board games differ from both; electrified games, such as Operation, which contain no circuitry, and those games requiring a website or app to be played.	Return to Dark Tower; Space Alert; Escape: The Curse of the Temple; Loopin' Louie; Escape Room: The Game; La Boca	
Game system	Game system board games are ones based around an item whose components are not a game of themselves, but are used to play games.	a piecepack; a decktet; GEMJI tiles; a chestego set; a shibumi object; Mü & More's unique card deck; a traditional deck of cards; Unmatched's unique card deck; a Hanafuda; Unsettled's unique card deck; a rainbow deck	
Miniatures	Miniatures board games are board games that use detailed miniature models to represent characters or units. Games of this type use miniatures as part of their game mechanics, combining tactics and strategy with collecting and artistry. Of all board game types, miniature games can be some of the most complex to produce, and time-consuming for players, who often are required to paint the models.	BattleTech; Blood Rage; Dead of Winter; Fury of Dracula; Gloomhaven franchise games; Mansions of Madness; Memoir '44; Nemesis; Rising Sun; Star Wars franchise miniature games; Santorini; War of the Ring; Warhammer 40,000	
Tile-based	A tile-based board game uses small tiles as playing pieces or to create the board. These board games are also called "tile placement" or "tile-laying" board games.	Examples of tile-based games that are also board games include: Carcassonne; Scrabble; Tigris and Euphrates; Evo; Takenoko; Cacao; The Castles of Burgundy; Quadropolis; Between Two Cities	

=== Age range ===
The recommended age range of a board game's target player market impacts the categorization of that board game:

Board game categorization by age range
Board game audience	Description	Examples	Ref
Adult / mature	Adult and mature board games are those designed exclusively for grown-up players. Compared to family or children's games, adult / mature board games usually involve mature subject matter, including violence, mystery, or sexual humour, etc.	Cards Against Humanity; Dead of Winter: The Long Night; Escape Tales: The Awakening; Kingdom Death: Monster; Tainted Grail franchise games; Monikers; Codenames: Deep Undercover	
Children's	Children's board games are designed for kids and are usually straightforward enough for very young children to learn in a short period of time, having bright colors and fun and engaging settings.	Mouse Trap; Animal Upon Animal; My First Stone Age; Dinosaur Escape and Candy Land; My Little Scythe; Perudo; PitchCar; Rhino Hero; Zombie Kidz Evolution	
Family	Family board games are those suitable for the entire family, including adults who play together with younger children.	Artriculate; Birds on a Wire; For Sale; Herd Mentality; Photosynthesis; Roll Through the Ages; Sushi Go; Ticket to Ride; or Wingspan	

=== Player number ===
Board games can be characterised by the number of players they are designed for. Board games can be; solitaire puzzle games, where a player's performance is assessed against a specified target; or multiplayer games such as competitive games, where a comparison is made between two or more players' achievements, or Cooperative board game where players all players win or lose as a team:

Board game categorization by player number
Board Game Audience	Examples	Ref
Large multiplayer	Take It Easy; Swat	
Multiplayer	Risk; Monopoly; Four-player chess	
Two-player	En Garde; Dos de Mayo; Chess	

=== Promotion type ===
The following categories of board games are not board game types but rather paths board game creators take to promote their game:

Board game categorization by promotion
Promotional Approach	Description	Examples	Ref
Collectable	A collectible board game is a special edition of a board game that has limited copies, such as anniversaries or deluxe versions.	Dune: Imperium – Deluxe upgrade pack; Dungeon Lords – Happy Anniversary; Pandemic – 10th Anniversary Edition; Magic the gathering – 4th edition; Ticket to Ride: Anniversary Editions	
Expansion	An expansion of the base board game is a set of additional components and rules for expanding on an original base game. An "expansion" requires the base game to play.	Living Rulebook (expansion of Blood Bowl); Boss Monster 2: The Next Level (expansion of Boss Monster); Wrath of the Righteous (expansion of Pathfinder Adventure Card Game based on Pathfinder); Pixel Tactics 5 (expansion of Pixel Tactics); Rumis+ (expansion of Rumis); Booster Packs (expansion of Star Wars: Destiny); Map expansions of Ticket to Ride	
Fan expansion	Fan expansion board games are non-commercial enhancements made by people other than a base game's designers or publishers. These are also called "unofficial" board games.	System Gateway (fan expansion for Android: Netrunner); Crabs Adjust Humidity: Volume One (fan expansion for Cards Against Humanity); Switching Gears (fan expansion for T.I.M.E Stories); The Crimson Scales (fan expansion of Gloomhaven); Atolla Modulis (fan expansion for Power Grid); Lost Wonders (fan expansion for 7 Wonders)	
Print-and-play	Print-and-play board games are those not published in a physical form but are those that require the players to download, print, and construct the game. Often, these games are downloaded electronically as a PDF file.	Air, Land, & Sea; Corinth; Evolution: Climate; Monikers; The Resistance; Rolling Realms; Root; Secret Hitler; Tiny Epic Galazies	
Travel	Travel versions of board games that are more amenable to packing and carrying while traveling have smaller game components to make them more compact, and simplified rules to make them quicker to play.	Compact versions of chess, or checkers	

== Glossary ==
Although many board games have a jargon all their own, there is terminology that is recognized and widely shared by gamers and the gaming industry.

== See also ==
- Board game awards
- BoardGameGeek – a website for board game enthusiasts
- Going Cardboard – a documentary movie
- History of games
- Interactive movie – DVD games
- List of board games
- List of game manufacturers
- Mind sport
