= The Voyages of Marco Polo =

Board game

The Voyages of Marco Polo is a historical-themed euro-style board game with focus on resource management for 2-4 players, released in 2015.

The game won the 2015 Deutscher Spiele Preis award.
