= Charterstone =

2017 board game

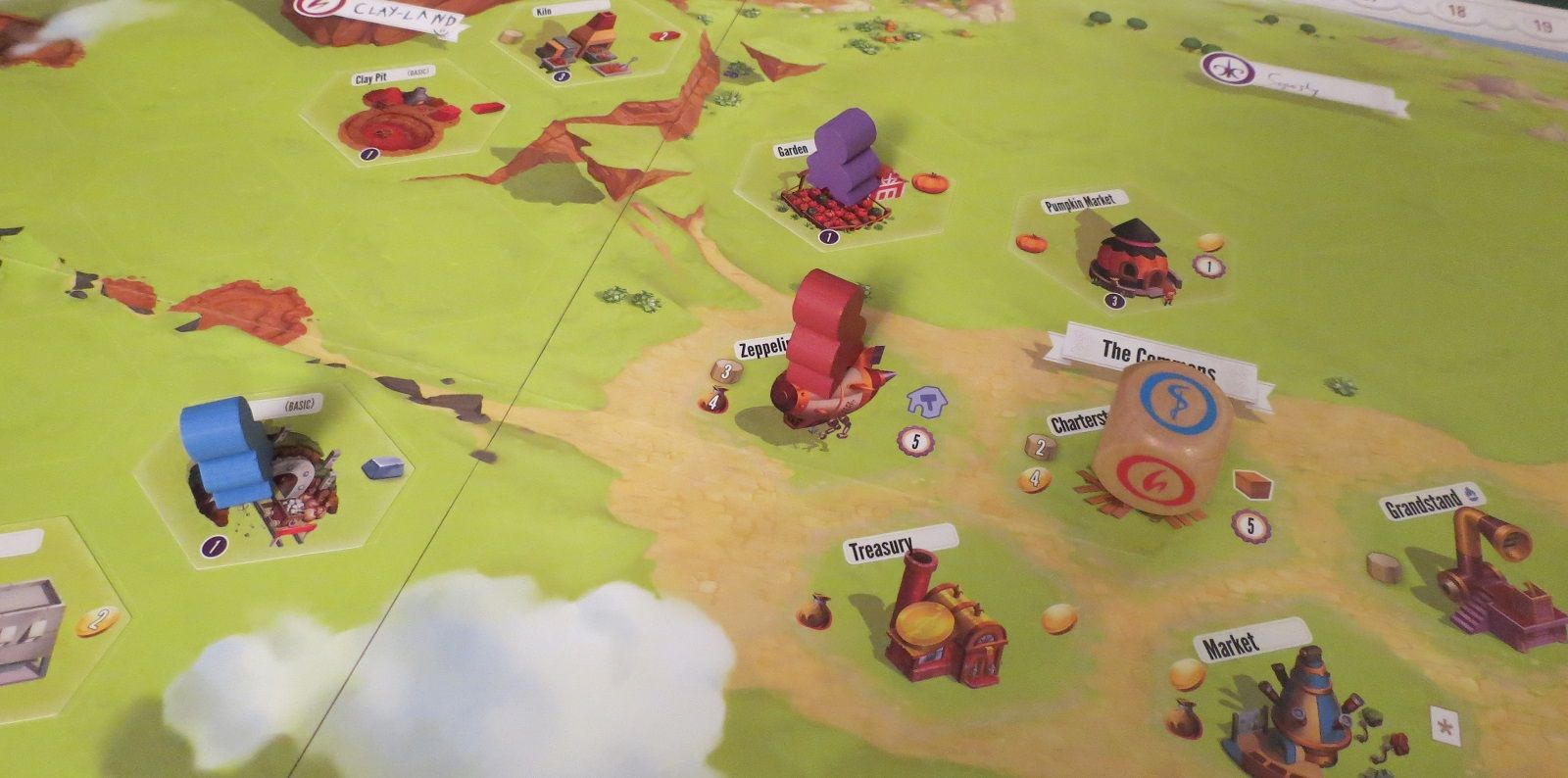
- A village in development
- Designers: Jamey Stegmaier
- Illustrators: Lina Cossette, David Forest
- Publishers: Stonemaier Games
- Publication: 2017
- Players: 1-6
- Playing time: 45–75 minutes

Charterstone is a board game for 1-6 players designed by Jamey Stegmaier and released by Stonemaier Games in 2017. Players work together over a twelve game campaign to build a village, while simultaneously competing to win each game, and ultimately win the campaign. Chartersone was designed as a "legacy board game" meaning that each game played influences, or leaves a legacy, for subsequent games within a larger campaign.

Players build buildings, score objectives, and spend money to open crates, which add new rules, buildings, and special abilities to the game. When the campaign is finished, players will have a uniquely developed copy of the final game which can then be played thenceforth.

== Gameplay ==
At the beginning of the first game, there are six buildings on the board, and players each have two meeples, which they can place on the buildings to collect some of the game's six different resources. These resources can be used to permanently add new buildings to the board in the form of adhesive stickers, which add new actions to the game which the players can take. Players gain points to win each game by building buildings, achieving certain predetermined objectives, paying money to open crates, and spending influence to move up a reputation track.

Opening crates also unlocks new rules and special abilities, and the players also gain new abilities from special cards they acquire each game. The game board and rules develop uniquely depending on the choices made by the players, so that by the end of a twelve game campaign, each play through of Charterstone develops into a different game.

== Release and reception ==
Response to the game has been mostly positive, with reviewers praising the satisfying complex layers of new elements the game introduces as it progresses, but noting that the game is slow to reveal its secrets, and can seem plodding in the early stages of the campaign.

Matt Thrower writing for IGN stated that "Your first play of Charterstone makes it feel like the world's dullest worker placement game", but that persistence with the game pays off: "Along the way strategies will develop in depth and push players along a path from co-operation to competition. It's an incredible journey if you've got the time."

== Digital version ==
Charterstone: Digital Edition was released on Mar 26, 2020. The game is currently available on Android, iOS, iPadOS, Microsoft Windows, Linux, macOS, and Nintendo Switch.
