= The Magic Labyrinth (board game) =

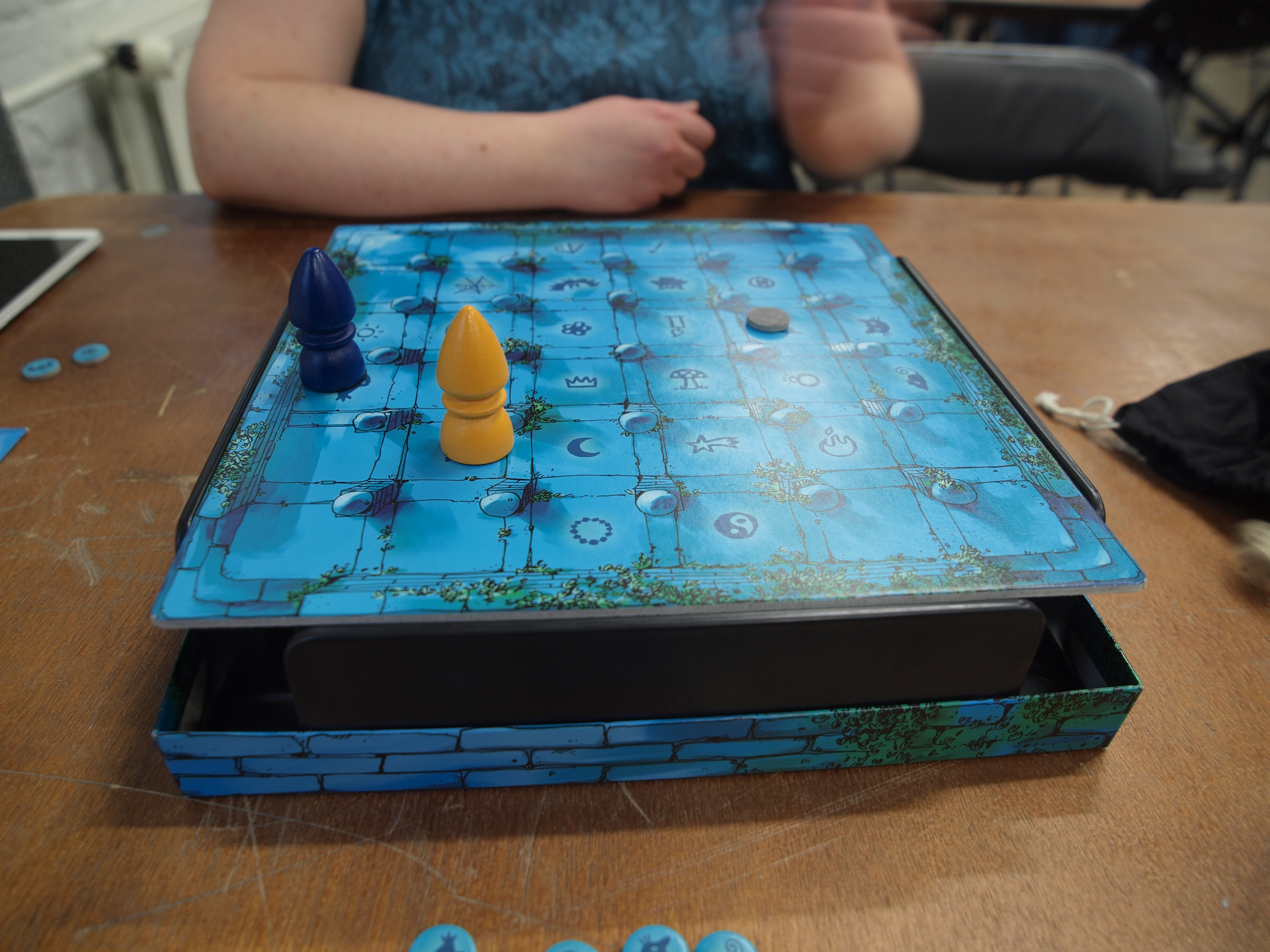
- The Magic Labyrinth during a two-player game. Notice that the walls cannot be seen, as they are underneath the board.
- Designers: Dirk Baumann
- Players: 2-4
- Setup time: 1-5 minutes
- Playing time: 15-30 minutes
- Chance: Medium
- Skills: Memorisation

The Magic Labyrinth is a 2009 children's fantasy board game designed by Dirk Baumann, for two to four players. The Magic Labyrinth is a labyrinth game with the objective of finding treasures hidden in the labyrinth. The labyrinth's walls are invisible, so players must memorize the locations of the walls in order to successfully claim treasure pieces.

== Rules ==
The game has a wizard setting and is played over a 6x6 rectangular grid representing a labyrinth. The labyrinth's walls are actually placed under the board, invisible to the players. The player's pieces consist of a wizard piece on top of the board, and a metal sphere underneath the board, connected to the wizard piece by a magnet. The pieces start out from the four corners of the board, with one player in each corner.

At the start of the game, a treasure is randomly selected, and the players have to get to the square representing the treasure. On his/her turn, a player throws a die deciding how many spaces his/her piece can move. If the player's piece hits a wall, the metal sphere underneath the board falls off, audible to the player. When this happens, the player forfeits his/her turn, having to move his/her piece back to the starting corner.

The idea of the game is that the players can't actually see the walls, only learning of them when they hit them. To be able to proceed, players must learn to memorise the locations of the walls. If a player successfully reaches a treasure, he/she claims it as his/her own, and another treasure is randomly dealt. The first player to claim five treasures wins.
