= Sushi Go! =

Board game

- Designers: Phil Walker-Harding
- Publishers: Gamewright Games
- Publication: 2013
- Players: 2–5
- Website: gamewright.com/product/Sushi-Go

Sushi Go! is a board game designed by Phil Walker-Harding and published by Gamewright Games in 2013. It involves two to five players collecting cards representing sushi or associated items.

== Gameplay ==
Sushi Go! is a card game in which between two and five players collect cards representing sushi or associated items to score the most points. Some of the cards are worth points individually, but are worth more points as part of a set.

== Spin-offs ==
=== Sushi Roll (2019) ===
Sushi Roll was released in 2019 and branded as a combination of the original Sushi Go! game with dice.

The game plays very similar to the original, with the same types of sushi and scoring making an appearance. However, the cards of the original are replaced with dice with each side depicting a different sushi icon. Each turn, players roll their ‘hand’ of dice and choose one to keep. The remaining dice are then passed to the left and the process is repeated until no dice remain. Players then score the sushi they have collected, according to the scoring rules of each type. The game is likewise played over 3 rounds, with the highest score winning the game.

=== Sushi Go!: Spin Some for Dim Sum (2023) ===
Sushi Go!: Spin Some for Dim Sum was released in 2023 with the tagline “a new delicious spin on the classic Sushi Go game” for 2 to 6 players.

The game includes a mechanical spin table which holds 6 baskets. Each turn, players must take the top card from the basket in front of them or use chopstick tokens from their limited supply to spin the table. This action rotates which basket is in front of each player, allowing players to strategically reach their desired cards. Similar to the original game, each type of sushi card awards a variable amount of points depending on different conditions. The game is played until all players have 12 cards, upon which their points are tallied and the highest scoring player wins.

Sushi Go!: Spin Some for Dim Sum continues with the same artwork and scoring styles as the other titles in the Sushi Go! series. However, a unique highlight of this game is the “Steamed Bun” plushie, awarded to any player who draws a steamed bun card and allows them to spin the table without using their chopstick tokens.

== Reception ==
In 2017 the game was reviewed for the Polish board game magazine Rebel Times by Maciej Poleszak. The reviewer praised the game for its simplicity and speed, visual design as well as for enjoyable play and the interesting ideas on scoring cards in a number of different ways. He also noted that the game likely works better with more than two players.

James Austin, writing for The New York Times in 2022, described the game as simple and fast, and praised the card art as adorable. Austin additionally commented that the game is "easy to learn but hard to master. It's as fun to play at family game night as it is out at a bar with friends." The reviewer also compared the game to the later Sushi Go Party! (also designed by Phil Walker-Harding), noting that the latter has a greater variety of cards but is less portable.
