= Nemesis (board game) =

Science-fiction board game

- Designers: Adam Kwapiński
- Illustrators: Piotr Foksowicz; Ewa Labak; Patryk Jędraszek; Piotr Gacek; Andrzej Półtoranos
- Publishers: Awaken Realms
- Publication: 2018
- Genres: Sci-Fi
- Players: 1–5
- Playing time: 90–180+ minutes
- Website: awakenrealms.com/games/awaken-realms/nemesis

Nemesis is a semi-cooperative science fiction Polish board game for 1-5 players, designed by Adam Kwapiński and published by Awaken Realms in 2018. The game is set in the spaceship Nemesis, and includes co-operative mechanisms with other confrontational mechanisms and conflicting objectives.

Upon its release, Nemesis was positively received for its replayability, tension, and components, but its high complexity was met with criticism. A base-game expansion, Aftermath, was released in 2021, followed by the stand-alone expansions Lockdown and Retaliation in 2022 and 2025, respectively.

== Gameplay ==
In Nemesis, players take on the roles of crew members of the spaceship Nemesis, having been woken from hibernation by the ship's computer due to an infestation of alien creatures dubbed Intruders. Suffering from temporary amnesia, they must explore the ship and try to get back to Earth while dealing with the alien threat, and also have hidden objectives, which may conflict with other players' goals. The game also combines co-operation mechanisms with bluffing, backstabbing, and other elements of a science-fiction survival horror adventure, and is played in 15 turns. To win the game, they must not be eliminated at the end of the game, reach Earth and achieve their chosen objectives using asymmetrical characters. It is possible for none, some or all of the players to win. Nemesis also has co-operative and solo modes.

== Reception ==
The game received positive reviews upon its release. Dan Thuort from Ars Technica complimented its engagement, replayability, theme, and the player elimination mechanism. He also considered the game to be similar to Alien franchise, concluding that "[rather] than elegant, the game is evocative. Don’t let the piles of plastic fool you—this is one of the most carefully arranged storytelling games of the past year". Writing for Tabletop Gaming, Dan Jolin also considered it to be similar to Alien franchise, praising its engagement, solo mode, components, and the combination of co-operative and confrontational elements, but criticised its length, complexity, and player elimination. It was also a nominee for the 2018 Golden Geek Best Thematic Board Game. Its expansion Nemesis Lockdown was also complimented by GamesRadar, with the reviewer Matt Thrower praising its narrative, replayability, tension, and component quality. However, he was critical of the accessibility, stating that the "rules are very complex and presented in an obtuse rulebook rife with minuscule fonts, confusing cross-references, and mislabelling".

== Expansions and Spinoffs ==
- Nemesis: Aftermath – Base-game expansion featuring an epilogue mode with a new ship and five new characters, released in 2021.
- Nemesis: Lockdown – Stand-alone expansion set on Mars, released in 2022. A video game adaptation was ported to PC that same year.
- Nemesis: Distress – First-person multiplayer horror game for PC, released for early access in 2022.
- Nemesis: Retaliation – Stand-alone expansion set in an alien nest, released in 2025.
- Nemesis: Legacy – Stand-alone expansion with a full narrative campaign, expected to release in 2027.
