= Burgle Bros =

Cooperative board game series

- Standard edition cover of Burgle Bros, the first game in the series
- Type: Cooperative board game
- Creator(s): Tim Fowers
- Publisher(s): Fowers Games
- First release: Burgle Bros; 2015; 10 years ago
- Latest release: Burgle Bros 3: Future Flip; 2025; 0 years ago

Burgle Bros is a series of cooperative board games designed and self-published by Tim Fowers for up to four players.

== Gameplay ==
All Burgle Bros games are cooperative games themed around a heist. Up to four players pick a character each, whom they will move throughout the game to enter various spaces, use items, crack safes, and escape with their loot. Non-player guards will patrol each floor, heading to random destinations and trying to catch the players. Victory is achieved when all players successfully escape with loot they have collected, while running out of stealth tokens results in immediate defeat.

Each space, known as a tile, gives unique effects upon entry. This includes alarms, which, if not handled properly, instantly leads to the guard heading towards the player. Other tiles, such as vents and lavatories, give players unique one-off boosts. Tiles are set up randomly, and all but one are hidden at game start, with others being revealed only on player entry.

=== Burgle Bros ===
In Burgle Bros, the first game in the series, published in 2015, players attempt to crack three safes in a three-story office building. Each floor contains sixteen tiles, one guard, and randomly set-up walls. Similar to its sequels, players start on the first floor with only one tile revealed, and spend the remainder of gameplay exploring tiles, triggering alarms and avoiding guards, and locating the safes, which are opened by players rolling dice.

Each safe contains within it a loot card, which add additional limits to gameplay, thereby increasing difficulty. Instances include Painting, which restrict movement through vents and doors, Chihuahuas and Persian Cats, who may trigger alarms at the start of turns, and Gold Bars, which must be carried by two players. Event cards, random events drawn when a player does not use all of their actions, have both positive and negative effects, adding an element of risk to Burgle Bros.

A digital adaptation of Burgle Bros has been released on Steam.

=== Burgle Bros 2 ===
Burgle Bros 2: Casino Capers is a 2021 sequel to the first game. Set in a two-story luxury casino, it introduces dynamic guests and more in-depth case cracking. Unlike its predecessor, which is set up the same way every game, Burgle Bros 2 is played as a legacy game, with each run, known as a "mission", affecting the next. Its box transforms into a two-layer game board.

=== Burgle Bros 3 ===
The third installment in the series, titled Burgle Bros 3: Future Flip, is to be released in 2025, following a successful Kickstarter campaign in April.
