= Food Chain Magnate =

2015 strategy board game

- Designers: Jeroen Doumen, Joris Wiersinga
- Illustrators: Iris de Haan, Ynze Moedt
- Publishers: Splotter Spellen
- Publication: 2015; 11 years ago
- Players: 2-5
- Playing time: 180–420 minutes
- Chance: Low (none after board setup)
- Age range: 14+

Food Chain Magnate is a strategy board game published in 2015 by Dutch board game publisher Splotter Spellen. The game involves competition between players for which fast food restaurant chain can earn the most money.

In 2019, Splotter Spellen released Food Chain Magnate: The Ketchup Mechanism & Other Ideas, an expansion to the main game, and in 2023 Lucky Duck Games announced Food Chain Magnate: Special Edition, a re-print of the original game.

== Reception ==
In 2022, IGN listed the game as one of the best strategy board games, praising "a richly strategic experience in which inexperienced players can beggar themselves with staggering ease", and noting its "tasty helping of capitalist satire plain to see beneath the game mechanics". CNET ranked the game as the "best complex strategy game" for 2022 and mentioned its "sheer scope". Shut Up & Sit Down praised the game, describing it as "cutthroat" in a positive sense, but criticised the game's 'reserve' card system because they said it resulted in players not knowing how long the game would run for at the beginning of play.
