= Klask =

Board game similar to air hockey and foosball

Klask logo

Klask is a board game in which two players compete using large magnets under the playing board to control their playing piece and steer a ball into the goal in their opponent's side of the board. The game has been described as a combination of air hockey and foosball.

== History ==
Klask was created by Danish carpenter Mikkel Bertelsen in 2014. The name Klask means "slap" in Danish and allegedly comes from the onomatopoeic sound made by one of the playing pieces falling into its own goal.

== Gameplay ==
The two players sit at opposite ends of the playing board and use large magnets underneath it to control their playing piece (striker) and steer the ball into the hole (goal) in their opponent's side of the board. If they do so and the ball stays in the goal, they score a point. If the ball bounces out, play continues. A player also gains a point if two of the three white magnets in the center of the board stick to their opponent's playing piece, if their opponent's playing piece falls into their goal, or if their opponent loses control of their playing piece and they are unable to bring it back under control using their magnet under the board. The game is played over a number of rounds, with the first player to score six points winning the game.

== Reception ==
Klask received positive reviews upon its release. Dicebreaker considered it to be similar to air hockey and tabletop football, and praised its simplicity and engagement. The review also compared it to a four player version reimplementation, but recommended the original one. Emily Heller from Polygon also stated that it was "simple and dynamic", complimenting the engagement. Matt Thrower from IGN also recommended the game, and commented on its intensity. Dominique Pariso and Rob Sparks, writing from The Strategist, also considered the game to be "a simple addition to a tried and tested game which adds a whole depth of strategy". The game was also recommended by the Spiel Des Jahres jury. A Wirecutter review, however, was more critical, praising its engagement but criticizing its size, price, and ability to play.
