= List of storytelling games =

This is a list of storytelling games – board games in which players construct or tell a story.

== List ==
- Above and Below
- Agents of SMERSH
- Betrayal at House on the Hill
- Consequences
- Dead of Winter: A Crossroads Game
- Dixit
- Near and Far
- Mice and Mystics
- Mythos tales
- Once Upon a Time
- Robinson Crusoe: Adventures on the Cursed Island
- Sherlock Holmes Consulting Detective
- Tales of the Arabian Nights
- This War of Mine
- T.I.M.E Stories
- The 7th Continent

== See also ==
- List of role-playing games by genre
