= For Sale (board game) =

For Sale is a 1997 board game published by Überplay.

== Gameplay ==
For Sale is a game in which a fast two‑phase auction game is about buying properties and then selling them for profit.

== Reviews ==
- Pyramid
- Trading Card Games For Dummies
- Family Games: The 100 Best
