= Captain Sonar =

Board Game

- Designers: Roberto Fraga; Yohan Lemonnier
- Illustrators: Sabrina Tobal; Ervin Tobal; Piotr Forkasiewicz
- Publishers: Matagot; Asmodee
- Publication: 2016; 10 years ago
- Genres: Deduction; Strategy
- Players: 2–8
- Playing time: 45 minutes
- Age range: 12+

Captain Sonar is a strategy board game about submarine warfare designed by Roberto Fraga and Yohan Lemonnier, and launched in 2016 by Matagot at Gen Con. Teams of players attempt to locate the map coordinates of the opposing team's submersible, and damage it using their weapons systems in order to eliminate the other vessel.

== Gameplay ==
Two teams of up to four players sit on either side of a divider in the middle. The players on each team fill four different roles.

=== Turn-by-turn ===
Each turn, the Captain chooses one action to take: move, use an ability, or surface, each of which must be announced for both crews to hear. The submarine can move one space at a time, but cannot move onto a space it has already been to, a space with an island, or a space with its own mine. Surfacing allows restart their entire path and refresh their energy gauges, but they must announce their sector to the opposing team and skip three turns. If a submarine cannot move to a valid space, it must surface.

=== Real-time ===
The real-time mode functions much the same as turn-by-turn, but rather than waiting for the opposing team to complete their actions before starting theirs, a team takes their turns one after the other, at any pace, without waiting. If a submarine surfaces, that team must pass around a map of the submersible with each person outlining a section of the ship until all have been before they may begin resetting their path and energy gauges.

== Reception ==
Dicebreaker included Captain Sonar in their list of the "best hidden movement board games," with contributor Sean Weeks praising its gameplay and roles, but noting that the high player requirement and fast-paced turns may not appeal to all. Ted Olsen, in Ars Technica, similarly argued that while it's a great game with 8 players, it is less appealing with fewer, and notes uneven teams are too unbalanced to enjoy winning. Luke Plunkett, writing for Kotaku, described the game as "an almost peerless example of the medium, its interaction, teamwork and conflict."

Captain Sonar was recommended for the 2017 Kennerspiel de Jahres.

== Adaptations ==
Published in 2017, Sonar is a reimplementation of Captain Sonar designed for smaller groups of 2–4 players. Unlike Captain Sonar, only turn-by-turn mode is offered, and there are only two roles: the Captain (a combination of the roles of the Captain and the First Mate) and the Radio Operator. On a team's turn, their submarine can take one of five actions: Sonar, Silence, Torpedo, Surface, or Move, which draw from a shared energy pool that is recharged by movement, rather than individual gauges needing repair. Torpedoes deal a single point of damage on a direct hit, and a submarine is sunk if they take two points of damage.

Sonar Family is a simplification of Captain Sonar designed for families with children that was published in 2018; it removes submarine operation mechanics and roles, and reduces movement options.
