= Fields of Fire (game) =

Board game

- Designers: Ben Hull
- Publishers: GMT Games
- Players: 1
- Setup time: 10-15 minutes
- Playing time: 300 minutes
- Chance: Low
- Age range: 12 and up
- Skills: Military Campaign Knowledge, Resource management, Strategic thought

Fields of Fire is a solitaire tactical wargame originally published by GMT Games in 2008 that is designed to simulate various historical campaigns of wars between World War II and now. The game is card based with two decks used to play, including a terrain deck and action decks. You must build maps for missions and then use turn-based strategic actions. A single game consists of several missions from a historical campaign and each of these individual missions can be played in about 3 – 5 hours. It has won Games Magazine's award for Best New Historical Simulation Game in their 2010 Games 100 issue.

According to the manufacturer,

This game is based on three actual campaigns experienced by units of the 9th US Infantry (Regiment) in World War II, Korea, and Vietnam. “Keep Up the Fire” is the motto of the 9th Infantry (Regiment), known as the “Manchus” for their service in the Boxer Rebellion.

A second edition was published in 2017 and a second volume featuring U.S. Marines was published in 2018. An expansion to the second edition was published in 2023.
