= Hyena chase =

Board game

Hyena chase (or Hyena game, or Hyena) is a simple race game originating in North Africa. It features a spiral track, and players race their pieces along the spiral from the outside to the centre and back. The first player to finish wins the hyena, which also travels along the spiral. On the return journey to the outside, the hyena eats any of the players it passes.

== Overview ==
The playing area is traditionally marked on the ground, but may be drawn on paper. It has a sequence of many circles arranged in a spiral, each representing a camp and the end of a day's journey. The first circle at the outside of the spiral is larger and represents a village, and the final circle at the centre of the spiral represents a well at an oasis. Each player owns a piece, representing a mother. The objective of the game is to travel from the village to the well, then be the first player to return to the village. There is also a piece to represent the hyena, which is unleashed by the winning player to jeopardise the return of the other mothers.

== Gameplay ==
All pieces start at the village. The players move their mothers according to the roll of a die (traditionally pieces of stick were used). A player must throw a six to get their mother from the village onto the first circle. A player must throw the exact number to reach the well; if the number thrown is higher than the number of days to the well they must try again on their next turn. Once they reach the well the mother washes her clothes until the player rolls a six again. Then the mother starts the return journey to the village.

The first player to get their mother back to the village (an exact throw is not required) wins the game. For added entertainment, the winner is allowed to play the hyena. Again, a six must be thrown to release it from the village. The hyena moves at twice the speed of the mothers (double the score of the die), and any mothers the hyena passes on the return journey are eaten and removed from the game.

== See also ==
- Mehen—a related game from ancient Egypt
