= Miguel Coimbra =

French artist

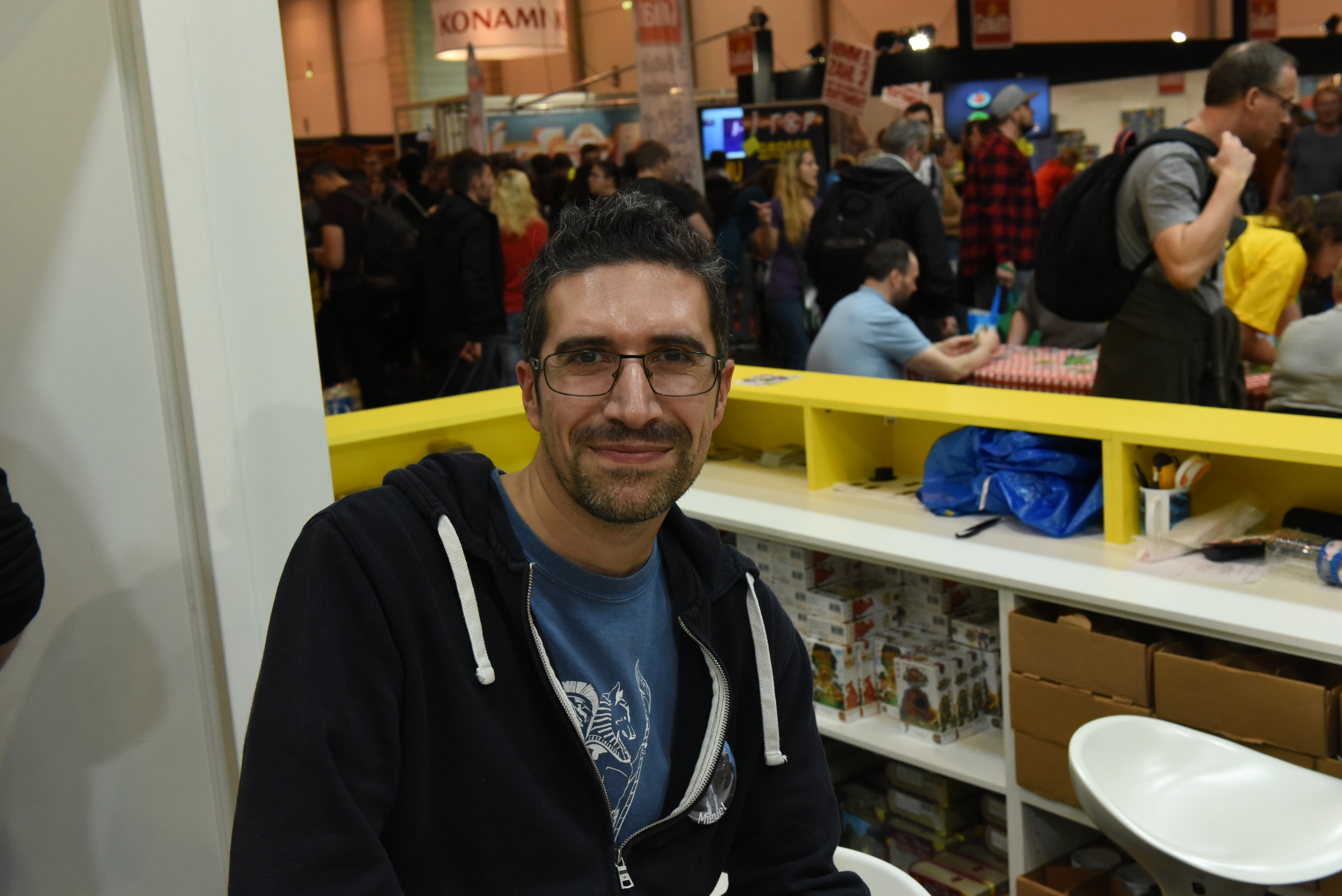
- Miguel Coimbra 2017 in Essen, Germany.
- Known for: Fantasy art

Miguel Coimbra (born 9 December 1977) is a French freelance illustrator and graphic artist.

== Career ==
Coimbra started drawing in his childhood. His special interest in games and the fantasy theme was aroused through the trading card game Magic: The Gathering. Coimbra moved to Lyon in 2005 and worked as a graphic designer for the resident video game developer Eden Games on titles including Test Drive Unlimited and Alone in the Dark.

Since 2006, Coimbra is mainly active as an illustrator for board games and card games. His best-known works include the board games Small World, Cyclades, and 7 Wonders. He has also done illustrations for trading card games, including the World of Warcraft Trading Card Game and Star Wars Galaxies. In addition, Coimbra also illustrated several book covers and concept art for computer games.

== Illustrated games (selection) ==
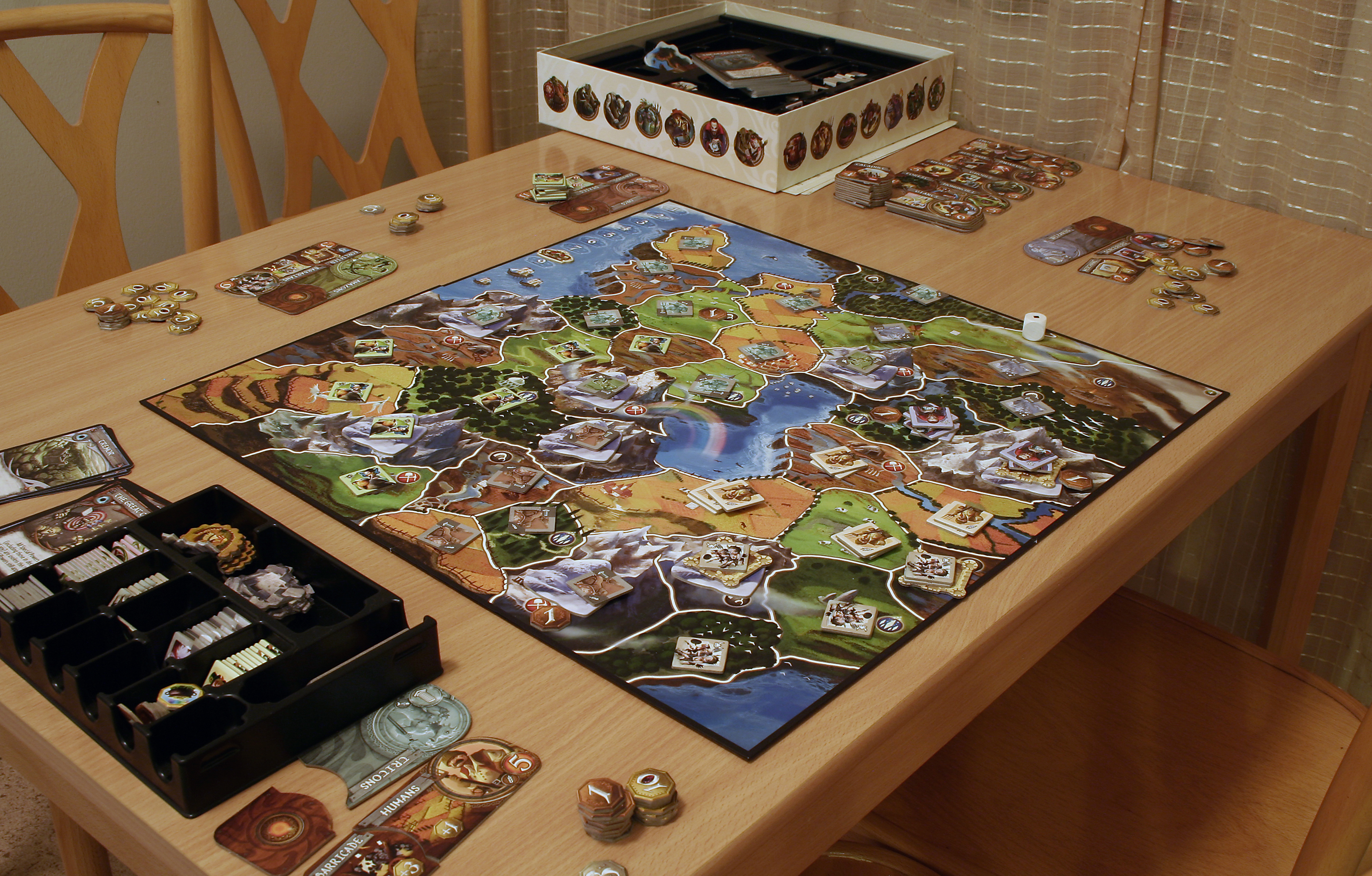
One of the games illustrated by Coimbra: Small World.

- 2006: BattleLore (Days of Wonder/Fantasy Flight Games), with others
- 2007: Gravediggers (Twilight Creations), English version of bank robbery (2005, Piatnik)
- 2008: Giants (Matagot)
- 2009: The Adventurers: The Temple of Chac (Edge Entertainment/Pegasus Spiele), with others
- 2009: Cyclades (Matagot) and extensions
- 2009: Small World (Days of Wonder) and extensions
- 2010: 7 Wonders (Repos Production) and extensions
- 2011: Small World Underground (Days of Wonder)
- 2011: Cargo Noir (Days of Wonder)
- 2011: The Adventurers: The Pyramid of Horus (Edge Entertainment), with others
- 2012: City of Horror (Repos Production)
- 2016: Argo (Flatlined Game)
- 2017: Outlive (LaBoiteDeJeu)
- 2017: Sentai Cats (Iello)
- 2019: Fuji Koro (Game Brewer)
- 2021: Wonder Book (dV Giochi)
