= Five Tribes =

Five Tribes may refer to:

- Five Tribes (board game)
- Five Civilized Tribes, early United States term for the Cherokee, Chickasaw, Choctaw, Muscogee and Seminoles
