= Campaign Trail: The Game of Presidential Elections =

1983 board game

- 1984 cover art
- Designers: Peter Andersen; William Snavely
- Genres: Strategy, Board game
- Players: 2–6
- Playing time: 60 minutes

Campaign Trail: The Game of Presidential Elections is a board game published in 1984 by Game Designers' Workshop.

== Gameplay ==
Campaign Trail is a game in which players run the campaigns for their candidates by collecting votes as they move their tokens around the board. The Electoral College and random political endorsements are also part of the game and must be factored in to strategy.

== Reception and legacy ==
Alan R. Moon reviewed Campaign Trail for Games International magazine and stated, "I find this game a little boring and long to keep my interest." Sid Sackson, writing for the magazine Games, thought it was "one of the most successful [games] in capturing the competitive fervour of the real thing [election season]". The same magazine named it 9th in their top 100 games of 1984.

A copy of this game is held in the collection of the Strong National Museum of Play (object 117.765). The 2012 browser game The Campaign Trail, by Dan Bryan, was inspired by the board game.
