= Who Can Beat Nixon? =

1970 board game

Who Can Beat Nixon? is a board game published in 1970 by Harrison-Blain of N.J. that simulates the upcoming 1972 United States presidential election.

== Contents ==
Who Can Beat Nixon? is a game in which one player is Richard Nixon, while the other players are his challengers as candidates. Players move their tokens around a continuous track, buying or bargaining for electoral votes, using money and media points as currency. From time to time during the game, a primary card is drawn from the deck, and two of the Democratic challengers must fight for the right to remain in the race. This continues until Nixon and one Democratic challenger are left. The player who is the first to pick up 270 electoral votes is the winner.

== Reception ==
In Issue 4 of Moves, Martin Campion commented, "The game is mostly luck, especially for the [Democratic] challengers. The only real strategic choices involved are in the small amount of off the board bargaining that is appropriate."

In Handbook for the Role of Games in Teaching Speech Communication, Michael Weatherly thought this game could be a valuable teaching resource for the classroom, but pointed out that "if the class is not concerned with political campaigns at the time they are utilized, they have little value. A preliminary discussion of our political process should precede the game and a discussion of the game's relevance to the subject should follow. The game thus becomes an integral part of the learning experience, not merely a ploy to keep the students occupied."

Alan R. Moon reviewed Who Can Beat Nixon? for Games International magazine and stated that "I guess there's just something about Nixon which brings out strong feelings in people. I don't think I'd care as much about a game called Who Can Beat Bush?"

== Other recognition ==
At a 1972 intercollegiate tournament with the topic "Resolved: That Richard Nixon should be Elected President in 1972", this game was the first prize, presented to the winning team from Clarion State College.
