= Schoko & Co. =

Board game

Schoko & Co. is a board game published in 1987 by Schmidt Spiele that simulates life in a chocolate factory.

== Gameplay ==
Schoko & Co. is a game for 2–4 players in which each player must buy raw ingredients, produce chocolate sweets and then sell them. Players must also deal with adverse fortune, such as squirrels eating all the nuts required for their chocolate bars.

Each turn is composed of seven phases and depicts a month in a chocolate factory. A game lasts a multiple of four months; players decide at the start of the game how many four-month cycles the game will last. Whoever has the most money at the end of the game is the winner.

== Publication history ==
Schoko & Co. was designed by Gilles Monnet and Yves Hirschfeld and was published in German and English editions by Schmidt Spiele in 1987. The game was published in French with the title Ambition.

== Reception ==
Brian Walker reviewed Schoko & Co. for Games International magazine, and gave it five stars out of five, stating that "the game is easy to learn and simple to play, and should be considered an essential purchase for lovers of economic and trading games."

Writing in Spring Offensive #36, Brian Bankler called this "A snazzy little business game." Bankler suggested "If you get this game, you should get a set of variant cards proposed by Alan Moon [via Moon's company White Wind]."

== Awards ==
- Schoko & Co was nominated for the 1988 Spiel des Jahres. The jury complimented the game highly, saying, "The rules of the game are written in such an excellent and understandable way that you can understand the game principle immediately and enjoy the full fun with the chocolate factory right from the start."
- The game won the 1986 Concours International de Créateurs de Jeux de Société.

== Other reviews and commentary ==
- Jeux & Stratégie #43 (as "Ambition")
