= Presidential Campaign (board game) =

1979 board game

Presidential Campaign is a board game published in 1979 by Banovac Corporation.

== Contents ==
Presidential Campaign is a game in which players move by rolling dice, and can collect cards, and are able to wage contests against opponents to get more cards by using dice rolls.

== Reception ==
Alan R. Moon reviewed Presidential Campaign for Games International magazine and stated that "it is nothing but a piece of junk [...] If I wasn't a collector, I'd burn it."
