= Mare Nostrum (board game) =

2003 board game

- Box cover
- Players: 3–5
- Setup time: 20 minutes
- Playing time: 120–180 minutes
- Chance: Low
- Age range: 12 +
- Skills: Strategic thought, Trading, Diplomacy

Mare Nostrum is a board game for 3 to 5 players, designed by Serge Laget and published in 2003 by Eurogames. It was also the name of a 1983 board game in the Fronte Mare series.

== Gameplay ==
Players assume the roles of one of five Mediterranean empires - Rome, Greece, Babylon, Egypt or Carthage. Units are placed on a game board representing the Mediterranean and the surrounding area, divided into provinces which contain one or more resources.

Players take turns in rounds of three phases:

Commerce Phase
Players receive cards for each resource they control. Once the players have taken their resources, the player who controls most caravans and markets (the Director of Commerce) chooses how many cards will be traded, and each player puts down that many resource cards from their hand. The Director of Commerce then chooses a card from an opponent's face-up cards and adds it to their hand. That player picks an opponent's card, and so on until all cards have been taken.
Political Phase
The player who controls the most cities and temples (the Political Leader) chooses the order in which players may make purchases. Players may buy buildings which improve resource production, military units (see Military Phase, below), or buy Heroes or Wonders which confer special advantages and count towards winning the game.
Military Phase
The player with the most military units on the board (the Military Leader) chooses the order in which players may make military moves. Players may move units around the board in order to control provinces or to attack other players' units. Travel by sea is accomplished using ships as bridges. Combat is resolved by rolling one six-sided dice per unit attacking, adding them together, and then dividing by five (rounding down). That many of the opponent's units are destroyed.

The first player to do any of the following wins the game:

- hold four Hero and/or Wonder cards
- build the Pyramids

== Game interest ==
Mare Nostrum is intended by the designer to be a more playable version of Civilization. The goal of the game is to bring glory to your civilization by acquiring great heroes and by building architectural wonders in your kingdom. Prominently featured in the game are historic personalities such as Julius Caesar, Cleopatra, Hammurabi, as well as the Seven Wonders of the World.

The game incorporates many features found in other games, for example:

- Resource production, management and trading (The Settlers of Catan)
- Military strategy (Risk)
- Diplomacy and sea travel bridging (Diplomacy)
- Player asymmetry (Citadels)

The game itself supports three to five players, but it is best played with all five.

The game has been criticised as being too inflexible in the player's roles; for example, Rome must play aggressively while Egypt must trade. Further, players are forced (to a certain extent) into certain actions early in the game; if Egypt is allowed to acquire too many resource cards they will quickly build the Pyramids; if Rome is not then held in check they will achieve military victory. However, once the game has been played a few times these strategies become less effective and the game opens out again.

== Expansions ==
Mare Nostrum: Mythology Expansion adds mythological and religious elements to the game. These include:

- A sixth civilization (the legendary Atlantis), including an add on map board and pieces for a sixth player
- Gods such as Isis and Baal who grant powerful favors
- A High Priest role and phase in which offerings can be made to the gods
- Mythological creatures such as the griffin, the centaur, and the phoenix
- A variety of mythological heroes such as Ulysses, Medusa, and Hercules
- A thirteenth resource (Pottery)
- A thoroughly revised rulebook

== Reception ==
=== Reviews ===
- Rebel Times #8
