= Vinci (board game) =

1999 board game

- Box cover of the German edition
- Designers: Philippe Keyaerts
- Publishers: Jeux Descartes
- Players: 3 to 6 (standard); 1 or 2 (with special rules)
- Setup time: approx. 5 minutes
- Playing time: approx. 2 hours
- Chance: Low
- Age range: 12 years and up

Vinci is a board game designed by Philippe Keyaerts. It resembles a diceless variant of Risk with variable special abilities and an original decline mechanic, and is also similar in some ways to History of the World. The game's name means "to be conquered" in Latin. In 2009, the game's mechanics were re-implemented with several changes and a fantasy-oriented theme as Small World, also credited to Keyaerts, and published by Days of Wonder.

== Game play ==
Each player begins the game by selecting one of several available civilizations. Each civilization is defined by two "civilization tiles", each offering a special ability or special scoring opportunity. Each tile also provides the civilization with a number of playing "pawns", to which an extra number is added based on the number of players in the game.

The player then makes use of these pawns to capture provinces. This is done without dice. To capture a province, the provin must be adjacent to a player's owned province and the player places a particular number of pawns in the target province, the number determined by the type of the province (mountain forest, prairies, farmland or normal in some games; editions vary), the number of defending pawns, and any special abilities of the players' civilizations. If the player places the sufficient number of pawns, the capture is guaranteed to succeed; if they cannot, the move is illegal. If pawns are defending the captured province, one of them is removed from the board and put in owning player's supply, and the remainder the owning player places in their own remaining territories. At the end of each turn, a player scores points based on the number of non-mountain territories they own, with some civilization abilities providing bonuses.

Since the number of pawns in a civilization is (usually) fixed, and goes down as other civilizations capture territories and "kill" one pawn in each territory captured, eventually a civilization will reach a maximum number of territories that it can occupy.

At the beginning of any turn, the player owning a civilization can declare that the civilization is in decline. This allows the player to select a new civilization and bring that onto the board while the pawns of the civilization in decline remain in place, no longer movable but continuing to occupy territories and gather points until their territories are captured by other players.

The game continues until a certain number of points is reached, whereupon the player with the highest score wins.

== Reception ==
Kevin Wilson comments: "Vinci is a tremendous light strategy game that captures the feel of conquering your way across Europe at the head of a marauding band of Gauls without having to deal with the minutiae of where to build your new aqueduct and how many archers to train this turn. It is highly recommended for gamers who enjoy titles such as Civilization, but who simply don't have as much energy or free time as they once had to invest in them."

== Reviews ==
- Pyramid
- Casus Belli #122
