= Cleopatra and the Society of Architects =

- Box cover
- Designers: Bruno Cathala & Ludovic Maublanc
- Illustrators: Julien Delval, Cyrille Daujean
- Publishers: Days of Wonder
- Publication: 2006
- Languages: English, French, German
- Players: 3–5
- Playing time: 60 minutes
- Age range: 10 +

Cleopatra and the Society of Architects is a board game by Bruno Cathala and Ludovic Maublanc, published in 2006 by Days of Wonder, illustrated by Julien Delval and Cyrille Daujean. In the game, players attempt to become the richest architect that survives the building of Cleopatra's palace.

== Gameplay ==
Players take turns collecting resources or building pieces of the temple, thereby earning talents. The game can be played by 3-5 players, and takes about an hour to play.

Certain actions, such as playing special character cards, will cause a player to gain corruption tokens. Corruption tokens can be removed by making offerings to the gods, whereby each player secretly chooses a quantity of talents to offer. The player who offers the most talents loses three corruption tokens, while the players who offer fewer talents receive varying amounts of corruption.

At the end of the game, the players with the most corruption tokens are fed to Cleopatra's crocodile. The surviving architect with the most talents wins the game.

== Reception ==
=== Reviews ===
- Rebel Times #7
- "Cleopatra and the Society of Architects review". RPGnet. Archived from the original on June 15, 2006.

== Awards and honors ==
- 2006 Golden Geek Best Family Board Game Nominee
- 2006 Spiel der Spiele Hit mit Freunden Recommended
- 2007 Golden Geek Best Board Game Artwork/Presentation Nominee
- 2007 Golden Geek Best Family Board Game Nominee
