= Small World (board game) =

2009 board game

- Designers: Philippe Keyaerts
- Illustrators: Miguel Coimbra, Cyrille Daujean
- Publishers: Days of Wonder
- Publication: 2009
- Genres: Strategy board game
- Languages: English, French, German, Spanish, Italian, Japanese, Hungarian, Danish, Norwegian, Swedish, Dutch, Portuguese
- Players: 2–5 (6 w/expansion)
- Playing time: 40 to 80 minutes
- Age range: 8 and up
- Skills: Strategy

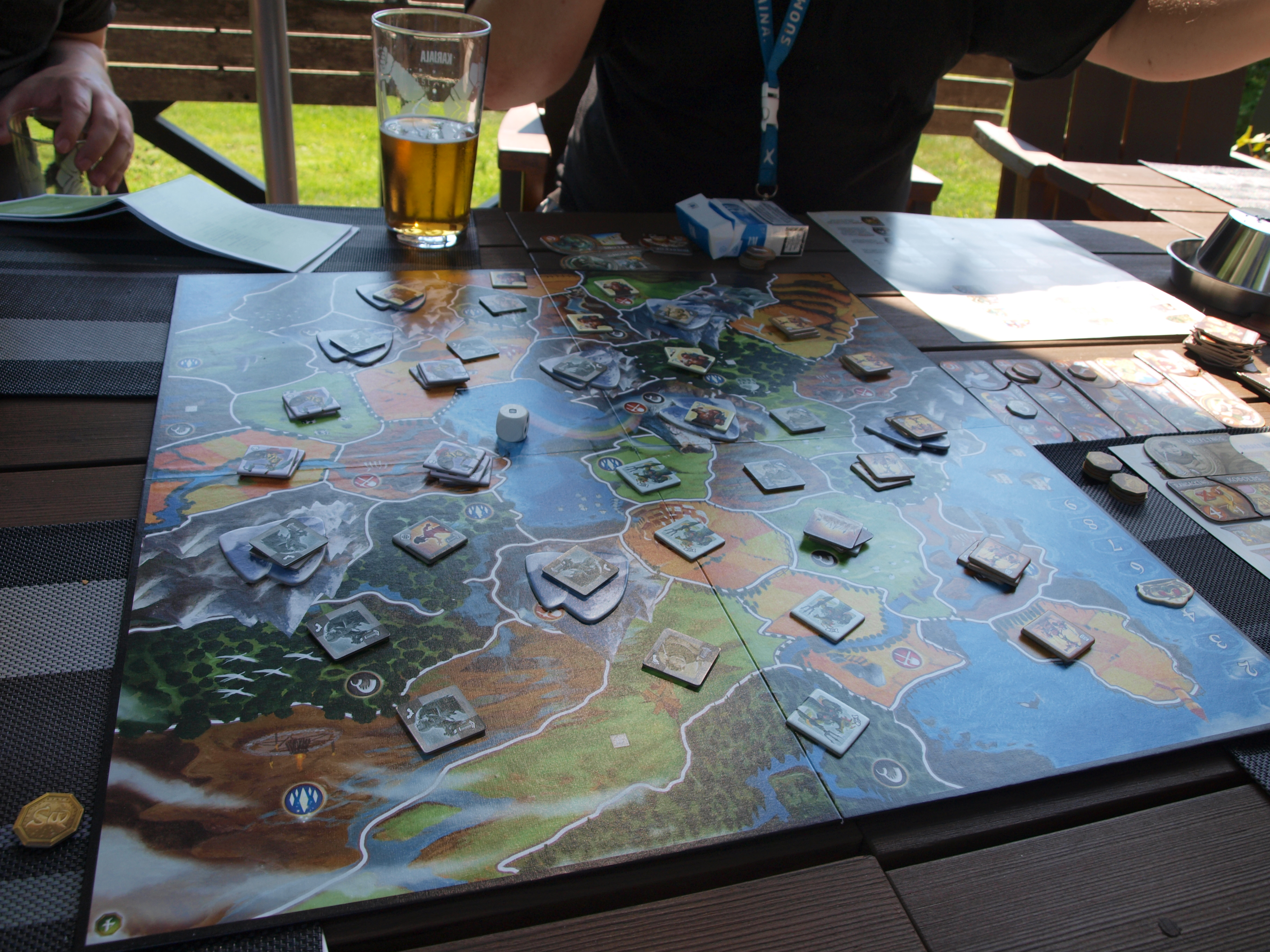
A game of Small World being played.

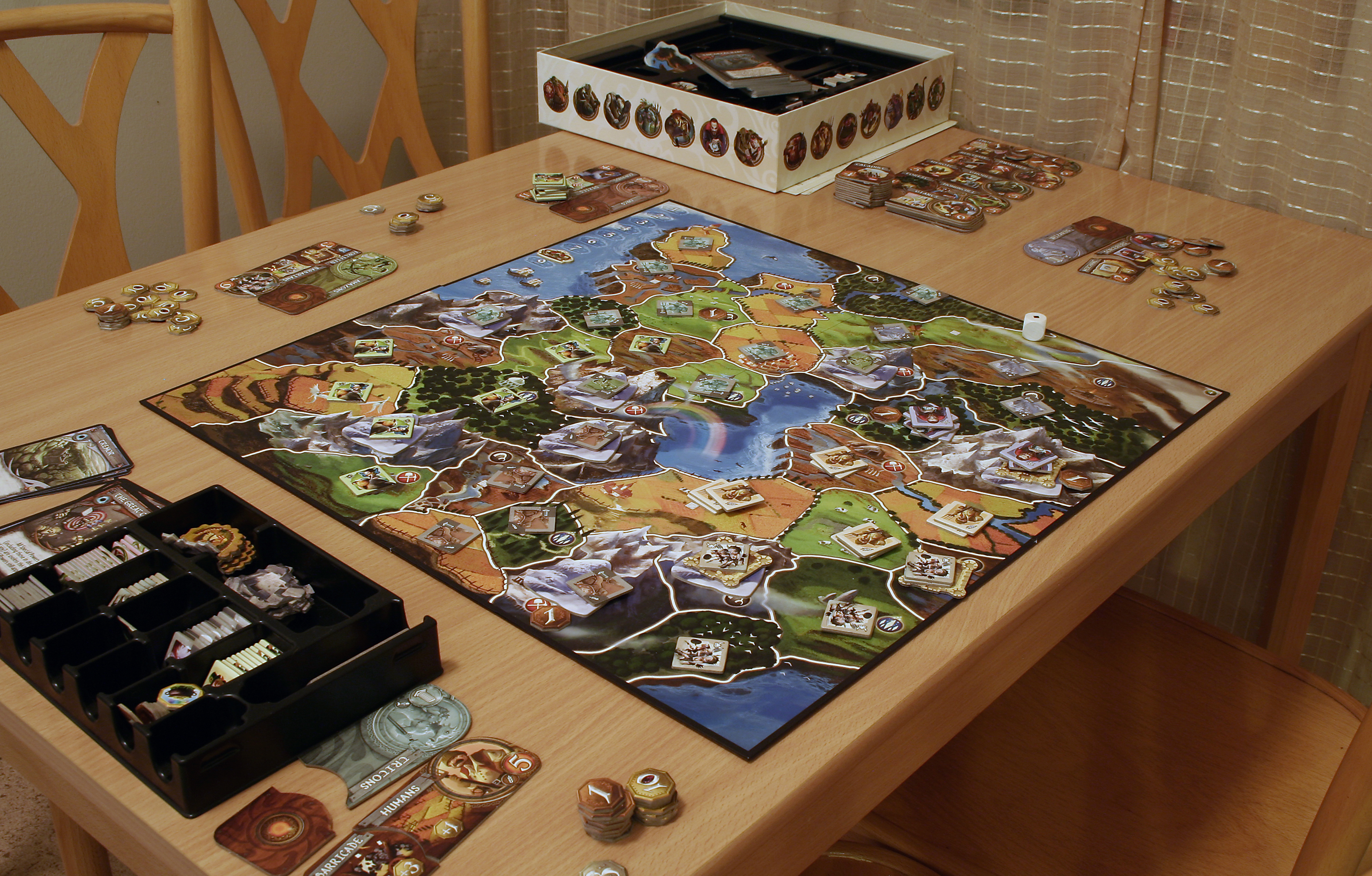
A game of Small World being played.

Small World is a board game designed by Philippe Keyaerts, Illustrated by Miguel Coimbra and Cyrille Daujean as graphic designer, and published by Days of Wonder in 2009. The game is a reworking of Keyaerts' 1999 game Vinci. Small World has won several awards, including Games magazine 2010 Game of the Year.

== Gameplay ==
Each player begins the game by selecting one of several available fantasy races that are created randomly. Each race is defined by two interlocking tiles, one giving a noun describing the race (e.g., "Elves") and the other an adjective (e.g., "Flying"), describing an additional special ability or special scoring opportunity. Numbers printed on the tiles also show how many race tokens the player may draw when playing that race.

The player then makes use of the race tokens to capture territory on one of four different playing maps. Map selection is determined by the number of players with a specific map used for 2, 3, 4, or 5 players. To capture a territory, a player must place a particular number of tokens in it, based on the location of the territory, the number of defending tokens, and any special abilities of the player's race. If the player can place a sufficient number of tokens, the capture is guaranteed to succeed; if they cannot, the move is illegal. If enemy tokens are defeated in a captured territory, one of them is removed from the game entirely and the remainder are returned to the owning player to redeploy in their other territories. At the end of each turn, a player scores points based on the number of territories they own, with some racial abilities providing bonuses.

Most territory captures are dieless; however, a player who is left at the end of their turn holding a number of tokens insufficient to capture a particular territory may attempt to capture it using a special die called the reinforcement die. After playing all the tokens into the target territory, they roll this customized, six-sided reinforcement die which increases the strength of their capture by the number rolled (0–3 units). If this total is still insufficient to capture the territory, the tokens are returned to the player's other currently owned territories and the player's turn ends; they cannot be redeployed to capture another territory, even if they would have been sufficient to do so.

Since the number of tokens in a race is (usually) fixed, and can only go down as other races capture territories, eventually a race will reach a maximum number of territories that it can support. When this occurs, the player owning that race can declare that it is going into decline. This allows the player to select a new race to bring onto the board while the tokens of the former race remain in place, no longer movable, but continuing to gather points until their territories are captured.

The game continues until a certain number of turns are completed, whereupon the player with the highest score wins.

== History ==
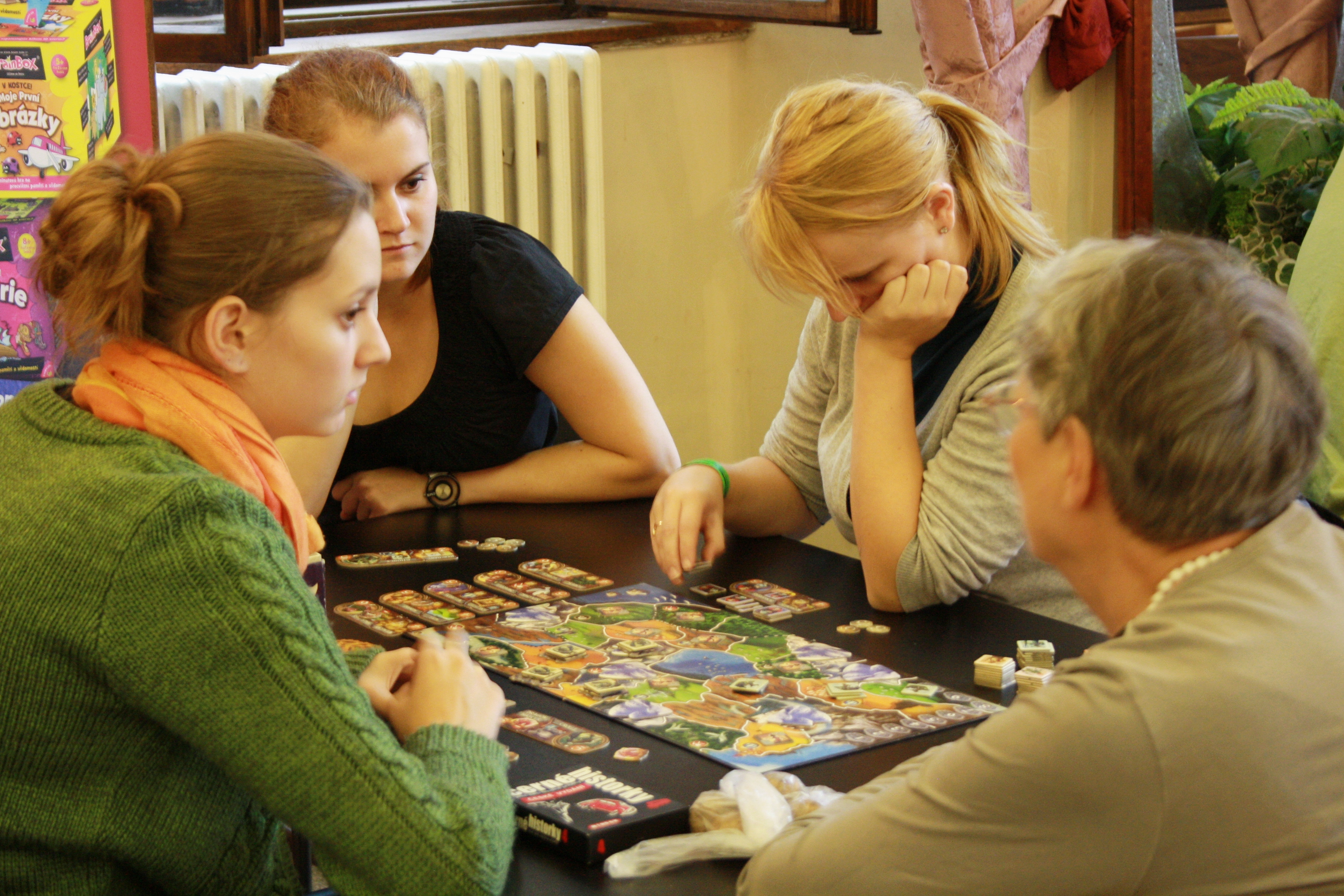
Small World

Philippe Keyaerts developed Small World from his earlier board game, Vinci. Small World has a new theme, the addition of dice, and separate race and powers pools. Days of Wonder announced the game by releasing one race picture every day from January 12 to 19, 2009. Additional announcements came on January 19 and 26. Small World was released in March 2009 in English, German and French editions. Dutch, Spanish and Japanese editions followed in June 2009. Small World has also been released on iOS for iPad and Android. There are many games like Small World that have come out or have yet to come out such as Risk or Rivals of the Dark Age.

== Computer games ==
=== Small World for iPad ===
In 2010, Days of Wonder released a touch-based digital version of the basic game for two players. It was their first tablet adaptation of a tabletop board game, and the first contemporary board game to be adapted digitally for iOS.

=== Small World 2 ===
Days of Wonder has also released a crowd-funded update to the game, entitled Small World 2, for Microsoft Windows, Apple OS X, Linux, and Android, as well as iOS. Updated features included five-player games, multiple new play modes, and the expanded list of platforms. Additional expansions introducing elements including new races and powers are available as purchasable enhancements to the game.

== Expansions ==
Small World has had several expansions. Some add new races and special powers (Cursed!, Grand Dames of Small World, Be Not Afraid...). Royal Bonus was originally only available to Kickstarter backers of the digital version of the game, but is now available to everyone. Some expansions add new mechanics or gameplay elements (Leaders of Small World, Necromancer Island, Tales and Legends). There is a standalone expansion, Small World Underground, that introduces a new set of maps with different region types and rules, including new Righteous Relics and Popular Places that give bonuses to the player that controls them, in addition to many new races and special powers. Small World Realms comes with hexagonal pieces to allow players to make their own gameboards, and tunnel tokens used to connect the original Small World maps to Small World Underground maps (originally released as a separate expansion). The latest expansion includes a 6-player map with the Original Small World on one side, and Underground on the other. It also has rules for team play, and new Righteous Relics and Popular Places designed to be used in team play.

The Small World Designer Edition, a special version with tokens printed on wooden blocks, pewter miniatures for the terrain features, and all of the official expansions included, was available initially to Kickstarter backers of the second digital version of the game and later made available to the general public.

== Reception ==
The game has generally received positive reviews with Broken Meeple saying "solid and will appeal to fantasy fans". RPG.NET have praised the game by saying that "one of the best war games you're going to find in a 90-minute package" and BGL have described it as "one of the best fantasy board games around that can be played under 1.5 hours". Board Game Resource have also described it as "nice healthy dose of fun board game action".

In a review of Small World in Black Gate, Andrew Zimmerman Jones said "we all enjoy Small World, and it's quickly become one of our favorite family board games. The initial set-up is time consuming the first time you play, but has proven to be well worth it."

== Reviews ==
- Family Games: The 100 Best

== Awards ==
2009

- Meeples' Choice Award
- Tric Trac d'Or

2010

- Games magazine Game of the Year
- Golden Ace Jury Prize winner
- JoTa Best Wargame Critic Award
- Guldbrikken Special Jury Prize

2011

- 2011 Ludoteca Ideale Official Selection Winner

2013

- Gra Roku Game of the Year Winner
