= Heat: Pedal to the Metal =

2022 racing board game

- Standard edition box
- Designers: Asger Harding Granerud; Daniel Skjold Pedersen
- Illustrators: Vincent Dutrait
- Publishers: Days of Wonder
- Publication: 2022; 4 years ago
- Genres: Strategy; Racing; Deck-building
- Players: 1-6
- Playing time: 30-60 minutes
- Age range: 8+
- Website: www.daysofwonder.com/game/heat/

Heat: Pedal to the Metal is a strategy board game designed by Asger Harding Granerud and Daniel Skjold Pedersen, with art by Vincent Dutrait, published by Days of Wonder in 2022. It is a race game in which players play cards to move their race cars around a circuit, carefully managing their speed and heat, the game's core mechanics, in order to finish ahead of others. Heat has received several awards since its release, including the 2022 Golden Geek Award Medium Game of the Year, and three expansions since been released.

== Gameplay ==
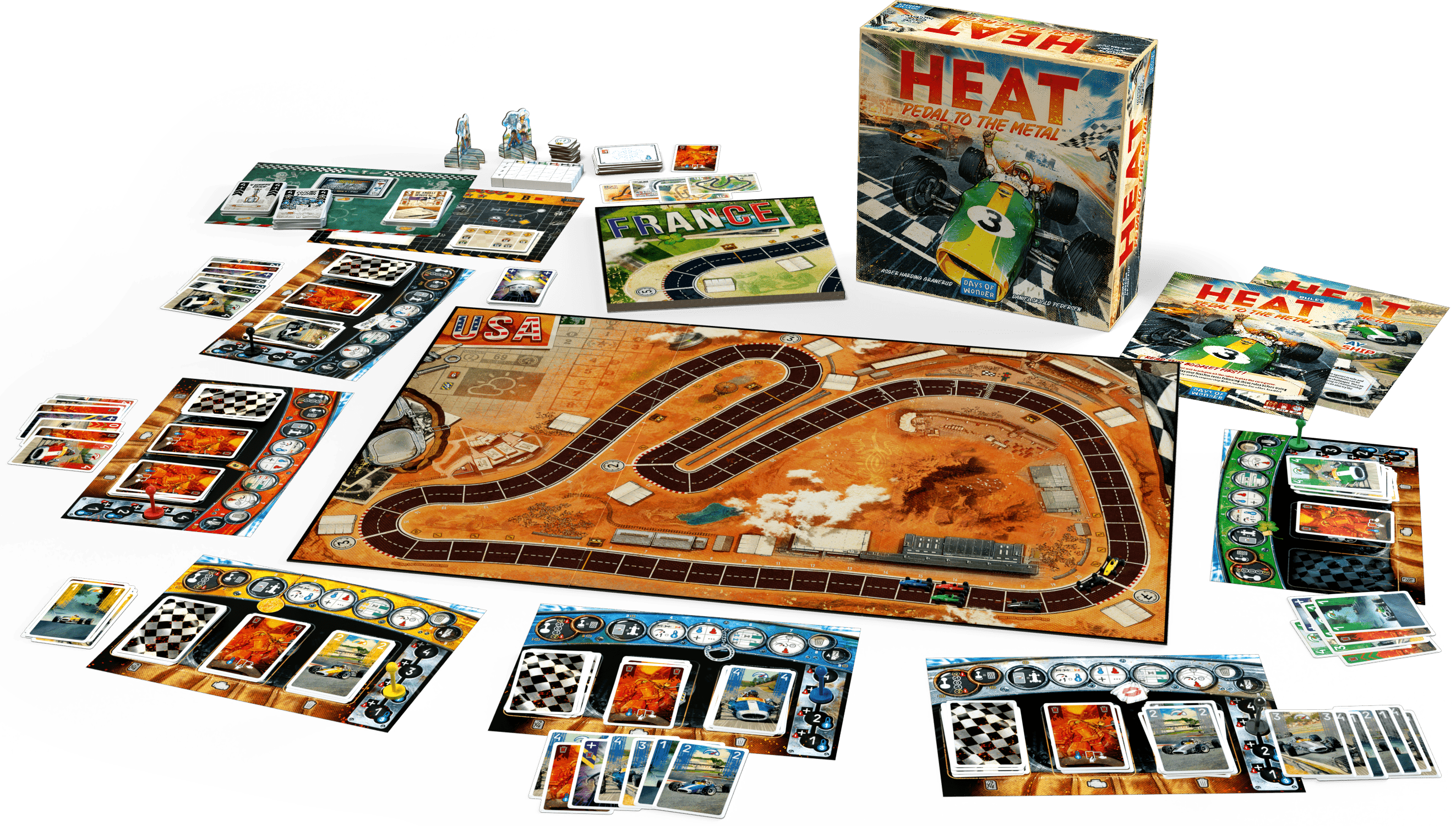
Game components

In a game of Heat, each player controls a race car, racing it around a circuit against up to five opponents, who can be other players or non-human characters, known as Legends. At the beginning of each round, all players simultaneously play one to four cards, whose symbols determine what their car does on their turn. First, the player adds up the speed values on their cards and moves their car that number of spaces. If the car crossed a corner while moving, the player will move a certain number of heat cards, a core mechanic of the game, into their discard pile. Any additional symbols are then resolved, such as cooling down to recover heat, slipstreaming to move in front of other cars, and boosting their car by spending additional heat.

Advanced modules are available for experienced players. The Garage module offers upgrade cards that have higher speeds and special effects, which players draw and add to their decks at the beginning of the game, while the Weather module adds dynamic conditions to corners and sectors, which may restrict or boost cars' performances.

== Development and release ==
Heat was created by designer duo Asger Harding Granerud and Daniel Skjold Pedersen, best known for their 2016 Tour de France-inspired board game Flamme Rouge. Vincent Dutrait, the artist behind Robinson Crusoe and The Quest for El Dorado, illustrated the game's artwork, and Days of Wonder began publishing it in 2022.

== Reception ==
Heat was released to a positive reception. It has an average player rating of 8.0 on Board Game Geek, making it the 42nd highest-ranked board game on the platform. Critics reviewed the game favorably, with Clayton Ashley of Polygon describing it as a "tabletop racing masterpiece". Aftermath wrote: "Heat is a taxing, exhilarating struggle between caution and speed, which somehow takes a bone-rattling sports experience and distils it perfectly onto a tabletop."

=== Awards ===
The game has won several awards since its release. Some notable ones are listed below.

Year	Award	Category	Result	Ref.
2022	Golden Geek Award	Most Innovative Board Game	Nominated	
2022	Golden Geek Award	Medium Game of the Year	Won	
2022	Golden Geek Award	Best Thematic Board Game	Won	
2022	Golden Geek Award	Best Board Game Artwork & Presentation	Nominated	
2022	Board Game Quest Awards	Best Thematic Game	Nominated	
