= Shadows over Camelot =

2005 board game

- Shadows over Camelot box cover
- Designers: Bruno Cathala & Serge Laget
- Illustrators: Julien Delval, Cyrille Daujean
- Publishers: Days of Wonder
- Publication: 2005
- Languages: English, French, German
- Players: 3–7
- Playing time: 60-90 minutes
- Age range: 10 +
- Skills: Cooperation; Bluffing

Shadows over Camelot is an Arthurian-themed board game designed by Serge Laget and Bruno Cathala, illustrated by Julien Delval and Cyrille Daujean. The game was unveiled by the publishers Days of Wonder at the 2005 American International Toy Fair and was more widely released in May and June 2005. The game was also published in French as Les Chevaliers de la Table Ronde and in German as Schatten über Camelot. In 2008, an expansion for Shadows over Camelot was released titled Merlin's Company.

Players take on the roles of Knights of the Round Table (with the possibility that one player takes the role of traitor) and play the game by fulfilling quests. The game is cooperative in that a shared victory or loss is possible in the absence of a traitor, and a traitor does not benefit if revealed too early. By contrast, the endgame with a revealed traitor is a competitive game of asymmetric teams.

This game was featured in an episode of Geek & Sundry's Tabletop on October 3, 2013 and Table Flip on March 29, 2014.

== Contents ==
- 20 page Rules Booklet
- 16 page Book of Quests
- 1 Main Camelot/Round Table gameboard
- 3 additional double-sided Quests (The Holy Grail, Excalibur, and Lancelot/The Dragon)
- 7 Coat of Arms (one per Knight)
- 7 standard dice (one for each Knight) and 1 special 8-sided die for the Siege Engines
- 30 Miniatures (7 Knights, 3 Relics, 12 Siege Engines, 4 Saxons and 4 Picts)
- 16 black/white Swords of the Round Table
- 168 cards (84 white, 76 black and 8 Loyal/Traitor)

== Characters ==
The Knights of the Round Table in the game are King Arthur, Sir Galahad, Sir Gawain, Sir Kay, Sir Percival, Sir Palamedes, Sir Tristan of Lyonesse. An alternate character, Sir Bedivere, was distributed in games trade magazines and at conventions as a promotional item, and is also available as part of Merlin's Company.

== Gameplay ==
Shadows over Camelot is a cooperative board game, a genre in which players work together in order to try to defeat a game system which itself is moving the game toward defeat for all the players. However, there is a chance that one knight is secretly a traitor, plotting the downfall of the others loyal to Camelot. The existence of the traitor turns a fairly simple game system into a hotbed of paranoia and accusation.

Each turn a player must first suffer the "progression of evil". They either decrease their health, add a siege engine to those attacking Camelot, or draw a black card, which will usually make one of the quests harder to complete. After the progression of evil, each player takes a heroic action, which includes moving to or returning from a quest location, advancing a quest toward victory, playing a "special white" card, discarding three identical cards to gain one life point, or accusing one knight of being a traitor. In addition, while at Camelot, the player has the option of fighting a siege engine or drawing two white cards in addition to the normal heroic actions. Finally, each player may choose to lose one health point to perform a second, different heroic action. For example, a player may move to a quest, choose to lose one health point, and begin to advance the quest toward victory, a series of actions that would otherwise require two turns. Moreover, each player also has a "special power", which can be performed once per turn in addition to the player's heroic action(s).

The board of Shadows over Camelot depicts a number of locations, each with an associated quest. At the start of the game, they are: Camelot; the War against the Picts; the War against the Saxons; the tournament against the Black Knight; the quest for Excalibur; the quest for Lancelot's Armor; and the Grail Quest. The quests for the Grail, Excalibur, and Lancelot's armor can only be completed once, whereas the wars and the Black Knight tournament repeat. Once Lancelot's Armor has been retrieved or lost, the knights have the opportunity to defeat the Dragon. The success in all quests is determined by the playing of cards, mostly in various sets, and perhaps by the player's willingness to sacrifice their life to further advance a quest for the good for all loyal knights. For example, Grail cards are used to complete the Grail quest, a set of 1-2-3-4-5 in Fight is needed to complete the wars, and two pair of Fight are needed to complete the Tournament. For group quests, the cooperation of players is crucial for completing them quickly to gain the rewards before the progression of evil takes its toll (either the players' health is too depleted and/or there are too many siege engines). Quests are completed with the knights' success, in which case white swords are added to the Round Table, or by their failure, which results in black swords being added to the table.

The game ends once the Round Table is filled with twelve swords; if there are more white swords than black, the knights win; otherwise, they lose. In addition, the loyal knights will lose if they cannot fill the round table before twelve siege engines surround Camelot, or if they all perish fighting the forces of evil.

=== Traitor ===
At the beginning of the game, a set of eight loyalty cards are dealt to the players. There are seven cards indicating 'loyal' and one card indicating 'traitor'. Since a game is played with at most seven players, not every game is guaranteed to have a traitor. Moreover, games of three players are often played without a traitor, since otherwise the game can become unbalanced. Should the players decide to play with the possibility of a traitor despite this risk, the rules recommend for each player to wait until after six swords are laid before looking at their loyalty card. In this manner, the loyal knights will have a slight head start and will be less likely to be defeated immediately.

Players may accuse each other, which constitutes a heroic action, and each player can make at most one accusation per game. A correct accusation leads to white swords being added to the Round Table, whereas an incorrect accusation results in a white sword being flipped to a black sword. Further, if the traitor is not unmasked by the end of the game, two white swords are flipped to black at the end, which may result in an unexpected defeat.

Once the traitor is revealed, that player no longer plays as the other knights and loses any special abilities their character may have. Instead, on their turns, they can taunt any other player, randomly discarding one card from that player's hand, and then draw a black card to progress evil in the game.

== Expansion ==
An expansion titled Merlin's Company was released in 2008.

The game expansion includes the Sir Bedivere promotional figure and matching colored character cards for new knights. Merlin is a playable figure, in addition to his special white card, which assists knights on a quest he is present at. A new traveling deck adds challenges when traveling to a quest.

=== Contents ===
- A 4-page rules booklet
- A new deck of loyalty cards including an additional traitor card
- 7 new knight's coat of arms
- 1 figure of Sir Bedivere, including orange coat of arms and die
- 1 Merlin figure and summary card
- 14 new black cards (including 7 new special black cards)
- 23 new white cards (including 8 new special white cards)
- 16 travel cards

== Reception ==
Peter Corless comments that "Bruno Cathala and Serge Laget's design for Shadows over Camelot is a worthy representation of the seminal Arthurian legends, and a wonderful addition to any game library."

Other reviews:

- Rebel Times #10
  - Rebel Times #15 (Merlin's Company expansion)

== Awards and honors ==
- 2005 Origins Award "Best Board Game of the Year"
- 2005 International Gamers Award "Nominee"
- 2006 Spiel des Jahres "Best Fantasy Game"
- 2006 As d'Or "Nominee"
- 2006 Golden Geek Award "Best Family Board Game Nominee"
- 2006 Golden Geek Award "Best Gamer's Board Game Nominee"
- 2006 Golden Geek "Best Light / Party Game Nominee"
