= Knightmare Chess =

Chess variant played with rule-modifying cards

Knightmare Chess 2 cover art.

Knightmare Chess is a fantasy chess variant published by Steve Jackson Games (SJG) in 1996. It is a translation of a French game Tempête sur l'échiquier (Storm on the Chessboard), designed by Pierre Cléquin and Bruno Faidutti. A stand-alone 80 card expansion called Series 2 was scheduled for a December 1997 release.

== Overview ==
The card called Demotion.

Knightmare Chess is played with cards that change the default rules of chess. The cards might change how a piece moves, move opponent's pieces, create special squares on the board or otherwise alter the game. For example, a card called Demotion says:

Replace one of your opponent's pieces (except a King or Queen) with one of his captured Pawns.
Play this card on your turn, instead of making a regular move.

There are two sets of cards sold separately, each consisting of 80 cards. The sets are known as Knightmare Chess 1 and Knightmare Chess 2; a single 160 card deck can be created by shuffling both decks together. SJG also sells blank cards, that can be customized by the player, in packs of 20.

The graphics in the English version of the Knightmare Chess cards are dark fantasy style, nightmarish (hence the pun Knightmare) color paintings by Brazilian artist Rogerio Vilela. The French original version had a cartoonish tone, unlike the English version, and the cards in the French original version are also different from the English version.

Another innovation of the American version is to include rules for "dueling deck" play, where each player has their own customized deck, possibly built from multiple copies of the set if desired. In SJG's version, each card is marked with a point cost. The total chaotic power of one's personal deck can be measured in the sum of the points of all cards in the deck. For a balanced game each player uses the same point total, or a stronger player can use a lower point total as a handicap. Cards which are too powerful to appear more than once per side are marked with an asterisk, indicating that a player can only put one copy of that specific card in their deck.

== Critical reaction ==
Peter Sarrett of The Game Report called the game "outstanding", remarking that it "result[s] [in] an unpredictable game which removes the tedium of standard chess while preserving plenty of scope for strategic play," and praising the "gorgeous" paintings by Rogerio Vilela. Sarrett's only complaints concerned the printing of the cards themselves, as he found the wording occasionally confusing and the text "rather small, which makes it difficult for players with poorer eyesight to play the game."

Ken Tidwell of The Game Cabinet praised the game for including "elements from both the strategic/predictable side of gaming and the wild/disorderly side" and found the artwork "striking" and "succeed[ing] in creating an air of comic horror." He concluded, "If I had to find a fault with the game it is that there is no attempt to reconcile the strategic game with the chaotic game and the contrast is a bit jarring. Even so, at the end of the day it is a good game and one well worth checking out."

Conversely, Steve Darlington of RPGnet, while finding the artwork "absolutely gorgeous" and that "in terms of sheer presentation ... [Knightmare Chess] is streets ahead of anything I've seen in years", felt that while the game itself "might make for an interesting game or two, it's not something you'll be playing an awful lot." He said "the dark design only conflicts with the abstract nature of the game, and ends up being more humorous than dramatic" and that it "ultimately doesn't hold your attention for too long."

In Issue 13 of Arcane, Andy Butcher rated the game 7 out of 10, calling it "an utterly bonkers game that's best played every now and then. as a change from Magic, roleplaying or whatever else you normally do."

== Reviews ==
- Shadis #30 (1996)
- The Duelist #16
- Family Games: The 100 Best

== See also ==
- Fairy chess piece
- Trading card games
