= Diamant (board game) =

Diamant Incan Gold
- Designers: Alan R. Moon; Bruno Faidutti
- Illustrators: Jörg Asselborn; Christof Tisch; Claus Stephan
- Publishers: Schmidt Spiele
- Players: 3 to 8
- Playing time: 20 minutes
- Age range: 8 years and up

Diamant is a multiplayer card game designed by Alan R. Moon and Bruno Faidutti, published in 2005 in Germany by Schmidt Spiele, with illustrations provided by Jörg Asselborn, Christof Tisch, and Claus Stephan.

An English-language edition of Diamant was published in 2006, by Sunriver Games under the name Incan Gold, with illustrations provided by Matthias Catrein. The rules for Incan Gold and Diamant are the same, but the games have other minor differences.

== Gameplay ==
Players take on the role of adventurers looking for treasure in a diamond mine. Players search for diamonds while trying to avoid various hazards such as spiders and snakes. Fearful players can run out of the cave, while daring players can choose to venture on, push their luck, and risk losing the treasure they have accumulated. After five rounds, the player with the most treasure is the winner.

=== Differences from Incan Gold ===
In Diamant players are exploring a cave or diamond mine; in Incan Gold, players are exploring a temple. Incan Gold comes with artifact cards, but Diamant does not. In Diamant, players have treasure chests; in Incan Gold players have tents at their camp. In Diamant, players are searching for diamonds, but in Incan Gold, players are searching for jewels and other gems.

== History ==
According to Bruno Faidutti's website, Diamant is Faidutti's second collaboration with Alan R. Moon. Faidutti said that they both held Can't Stop by Sid Sackson "in great esteem" and they wanted to design their own game where players would have to choose between keeping what they have or risk losing all they had acquired. Faidutti said he suggested a kind of "common pool Can't Stop" where all the players were in the same situation but could make different decisions. Faidutti described the theme as "somewhere between Indiana Jones and Alan Quatermain". Faidutti said the first prototype of the game used an Incan or Mayan temple as the setting. The danger cards were initially frightening noises but those were changed by the publisher. Faidutti said an attempt to add action cards to the game was not successful in playtesting. Friedemann Friese suggested that the card "that triggered the bust" be removed from the game and that only one voting token was necessary.

Jürgen Valentiner Brandt of Schmidt Spiele was the first publisher to make a "firm proposal" to Faidutti and Moon and they signed a contract with Schmidt Spiele in September 2004. The game was published for the Nürnberg fair in February 2005. Faidutti felt that the original title of the game, "The Temple of Doom", was much stronger but the publishers changed it to Diamant.

Alan R. Moon talked with various American publishers and the U.S. edition of the game was published in late 2006 by Sunriver Games. The publishers wanted to rename it "The Temple of Doom" but went with Incan Gold because of legal issues. Faidutti noted that Incan Gold had some changes from Diamant. The rules stayed the same, but Incan Gold does not have cardboard chests or wooden pawns, and artifact cards were added to the game.

== Awards ==
- Spiel des Jahres 2005, Recommended
- International Gamers Awards 2005, Best Strategy Game Nominee
- Japan Boardgame Prize 2005 - Best Foreign Game for Beginners
- 2006 BoardGameGeek Golden Geek award for Best Light/Party Game
- GAMES Magazine 2008 Best Family Game Nominee (Incan Gold)

== Reviews ==
- Pyramid
