= Jungle Speed =

1991 card game

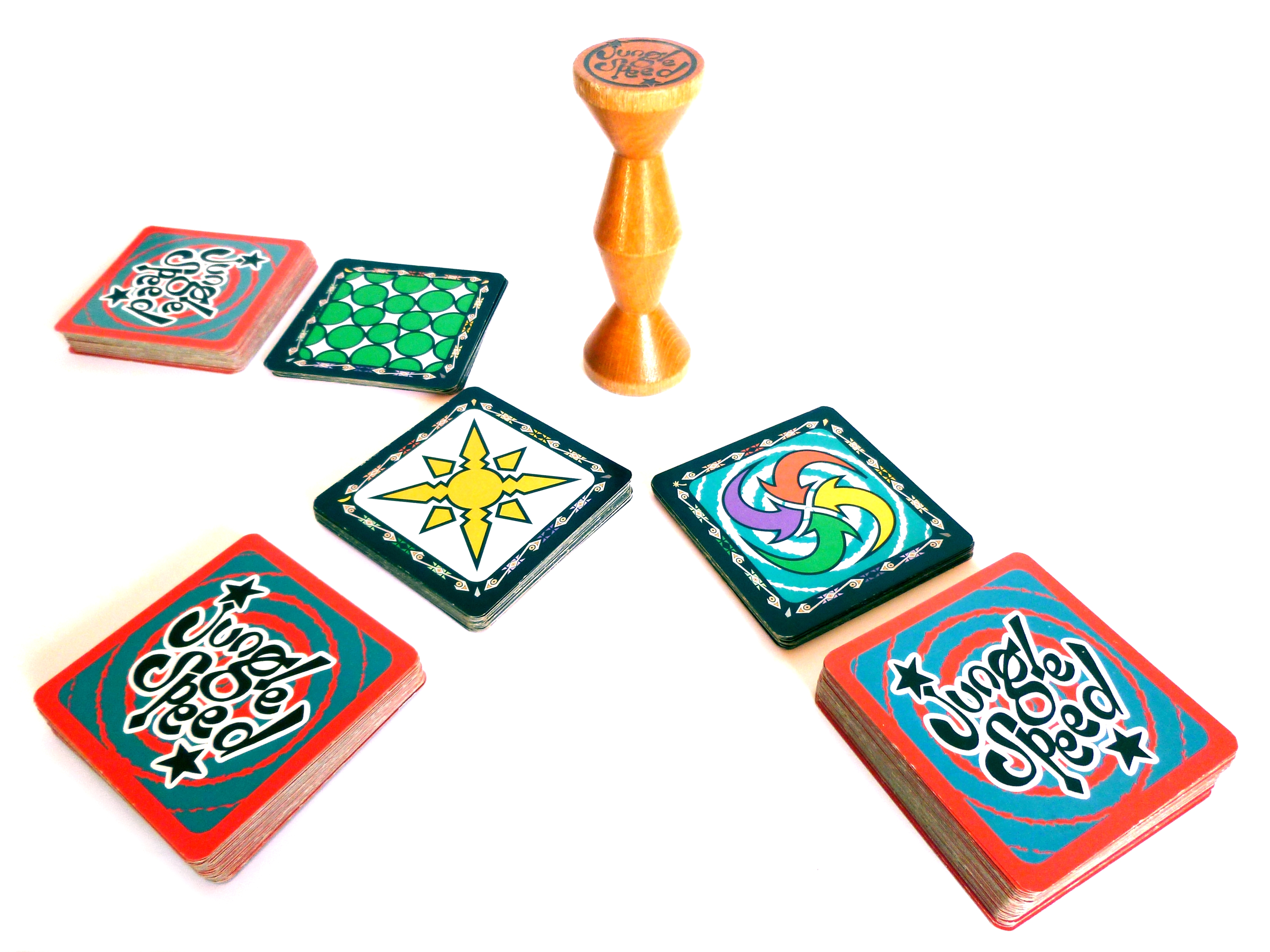
- Designers: Thomas Vuarchex and Pierric Yakovenko
- Publishers: Asmodee Editions
- Publication: since 1991
- Players: 2 or more
- Chance: 4/80 cards (1/20)
- Age range: 6+
- Skills: Patience, speed, judgement, reflexes
- Website: junglespeed.fr

Jungle Speed is a card game created by Thomas Vuarchex and Pierric Yakovenko in 1991. First self-published and now published by Asmodee Editions, it is played with non-standard playing cards. An expansion and all-in set have been published.

== Rules ==
The game revolves around matching cards with identical symbols, and it has some similarities to the children's game Slapjack. Complexity is added by some visual similarities between some of the symbols, as well as additional rules.

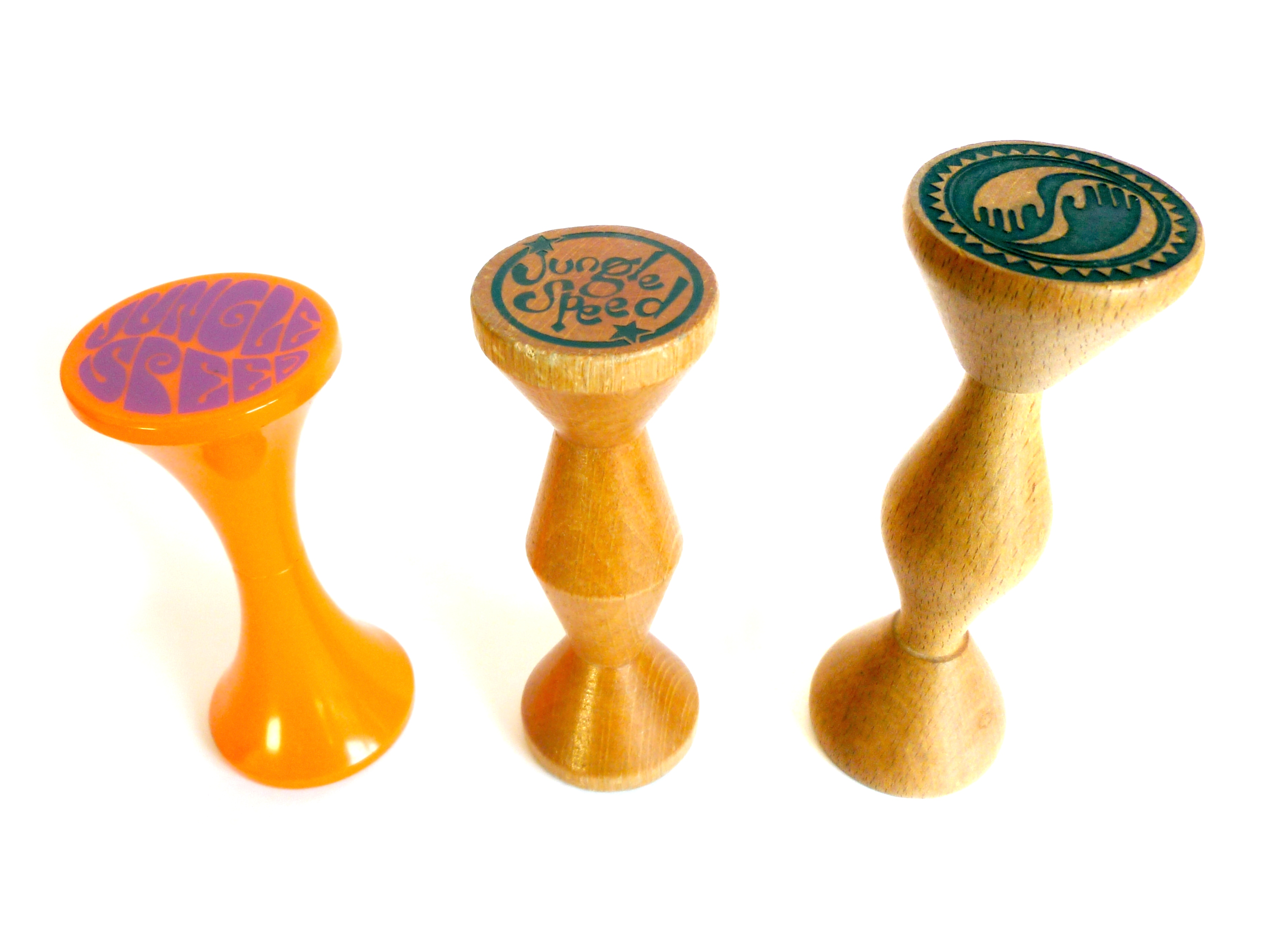
Various Jungle Speed Totems from different editions of the game

Cards are shuffled and dealt to each player face down, ensuring that all players have an equal number of cards in their stacks. A wooden (or rubber) cylinder called a "Totem" is placed in the center of the table, equidistant from all players. Any remaining cards that cannot be distributed equitably are placed under the totem in an area known as the "Pot". Players take turns playing the top card from their stacks in a clockwise rotation. Each player does this by flipping their card over in the direction of their opponents, so that their opponents get the first glance at their card to avoid unfair advantage. The card is then quickly placed in front of the player's pile. Thus players form discard piles in front of their piles of cards as the game progresses. When a player plays a card that matches the symbol of another player's top card, the two players must duel to grab the totem in the center as quickly as possible. The loser of the duel takes both players' played cards (their discard pile plus the card currently in play), as well as any cards in the pot, and places them at the bottom of his deck. The loser of the round plays the next card.

There are also three special effect cards that come into play.

- Fast Grab: Blue arrows pointing inwards. All players may reach for the totem. The player who successfully grabs the totem puts his discarded cards in the pot and plays the next round.
- All Flip: Blue arrows pointing outwards. The player who plays this card counts to three. On three, all players play a card simultaneously, with any other special cards having their effect. In the event this causes a duel between three or more players, the winner of the round may choose who the loser will be, or what duel type is played for. Any additional duels left over are void for the next round.
- Color Match: Multicolored arrows pointing inwards. For the remainder of the round (i.e. while the card is still exposed), duels are based on matching colors, and symbol duels do not apply. Once the round ends, normal play resumes. Not used in games with three players or less.

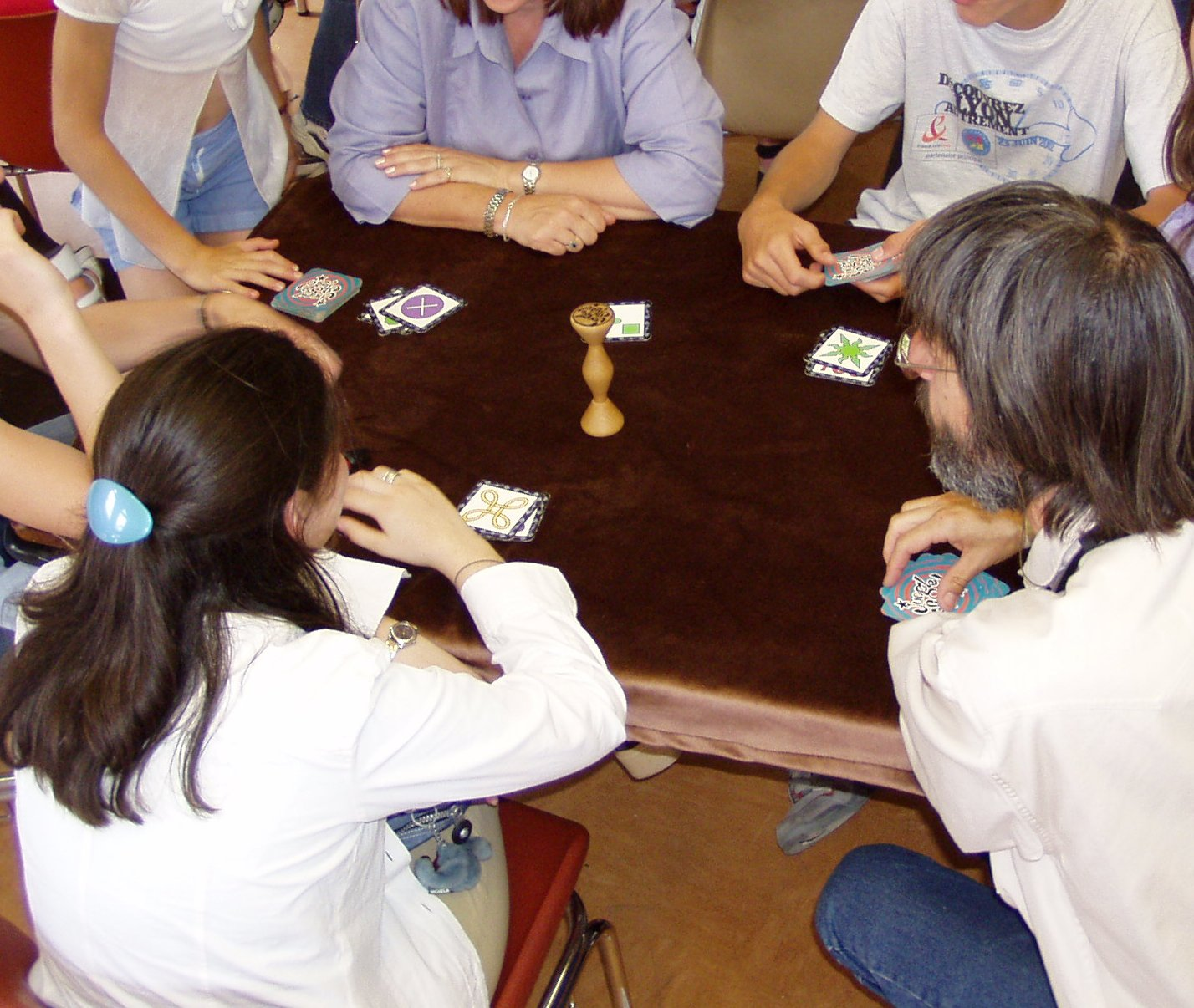
Jungle Speed being played

If a player commits one of the following errors, or "Fouls", they must take all the cards currently in play (the discard piles of all the other players plus all the cards in the pot) and place them at the bottom of their deck.

- Grabbing the totem when you are not supposed to according to the active rules. This is the most common error, due to several symbols being similar to each other.
- Knocking over, dropping, or otherwise disturbing the totem
- Uncovering the top card towards themselves
- Using violence against other players to obtain the totem (e.g. knocking an opponent's hand away, blocking their access to the totem, a knee in the box, etc.)
- Returning the totem upside down after a duel (with side of the totem with "Jungle Speed" on it facing down)

The winner is the first player to get rid of all their cards and have them passed onto other players or the pot.

== Alternate versions ==
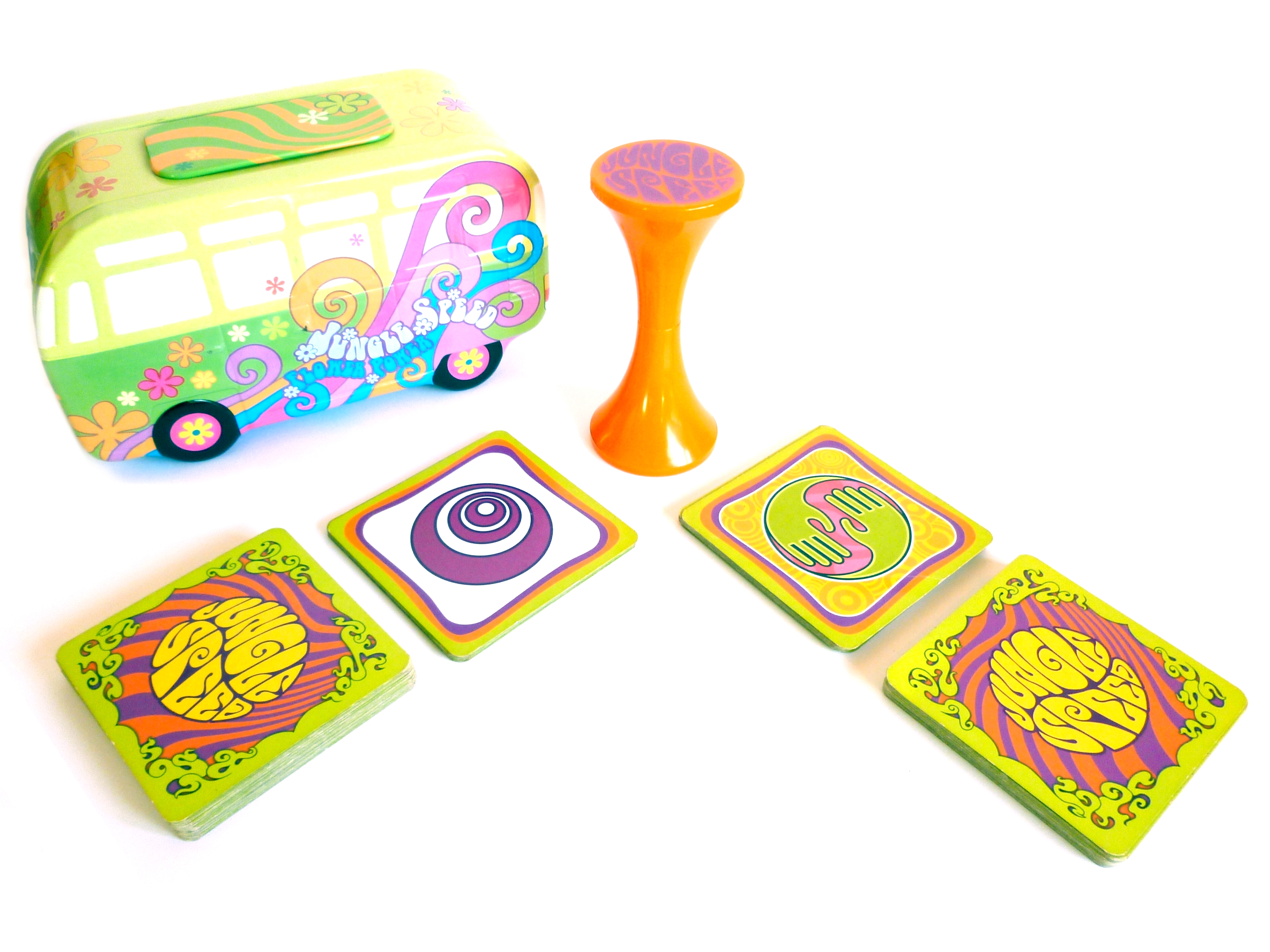
Jungle Speed Flower Power

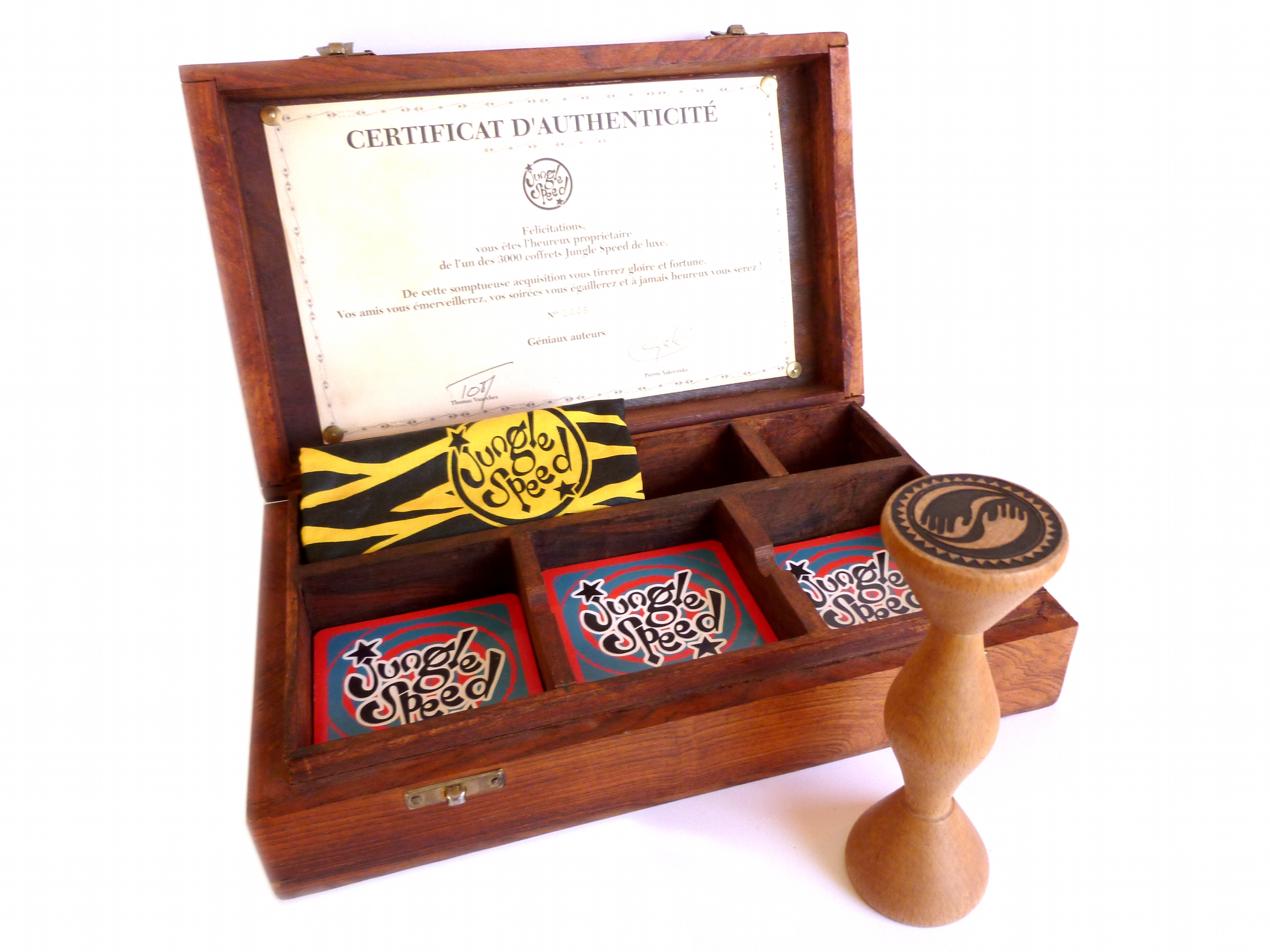
Jungle Speed Luxe

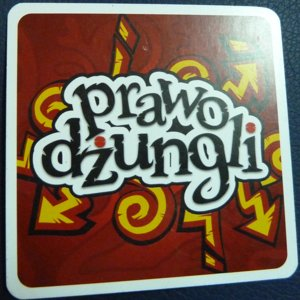
Prawo Dżungli an unauthorized Polish version of the game.

=== New Edition ===
Asmodee released a new edition in 2011 with an updated design for the cards and, in some markets, a plastic totem for added safety. The expansions are made to be used with this edition of the game.

=== Expanded Version ===
The expanded version adds several new symbol variations, as well as new effect cards:

- Inner Hands: Hand shaped arrows pointing inwards. All players place one of their hands on top of the totem as quickly as possible without making it fall over. The first to place their hand on the totem is the winner of the round, while the last person is the loser.
- Pass it Forward: Blue arrows circulating. Players now match using the cards played by the player on their left. This remains in effect until the next round (i.e. while the card is still exposed), or until another effect card is played.

=== The Lapins Crétins version ===
A special version of the game released in France, based on Ubisoft's Rabbids (The Lapins Crétins) series of video games. The game features designs based on the game and comes in a Rabbid-shaped sack, which also includes a bonus figurine that is implemented into the game. The key difference is that, after the totem has been grabbed, any player may then grab the Rabbid and give one of the cards in their discard pile to the other player.

- Rabbid Hunter (Lapin Chasseur): Rabbids reaching for the totem. Same as Fast Grab.
- Hot Rabbid (Lapin Chaud): Totem-shaped Rabbids reaching for a Rabbid. All players reach for the Rabbid figure. The totem may fall over, but must not be grabbed. The player who successfully grabs the Rabbid distributes their discard pile to the other players, beginning with the player of their choice and moving clockwise.
- BWAAAAAAAH: Totem-shaped Rabbids with their fingers sticking up. When this card is played, all players must stick their hands over their heads with two fingers sticking up and yell "BWAAAAAAH!" The last person to do so must take the discard piles of all the players, as well as any cards in the pot.
- The Beaten (La Battue): A full colored card showing a totem and several Rabbids with their eyes shut. When this card is played, the players put their decks aside so that the table is clear. All players shut their eyes whilst the player who played the card places the totem anywhere on their table (provided it is reachable by all players). When said player says 'OK', the other players must try to reach the totem with their eyes shut, the winner placing his/her discard pile under the pot. The player who placed the totem will look to see if anyone has their eyes open. Anyone who does must take all the players' discard piles and whatever is under the pot.

=== Common House Rules ===
A variety of common but unofficial house rules exist for the original Jungle Speed game.

- No Holds Barred: One of the most common house rules is the waiving of the rules against violence over the totem. Violence is encouraged, with the only actually banned move is any contact with the opposing player with the hand not holding the totem. Despite this lack of rules, behavior such as biting, scratching, hair pulling, or attacking sensitive areas such as testicles are strongly discouraged. The struggle can continue until one player holds the totem alone.
- Sanctioned Dueling: This rule goes into effect when more than two players have matching cards under the current rules. Whichever player is able to gain control of the totem puts their cards in the center pot, and may then request the other members of the duel to put a finger on a body part. In some variations, this is always the ear, while in others the player running the duel may choose a body part. The players may not grab for the totem until the player running the duel removes their hand from the totem. At this point, the duel continues as normal, and if there are still multiple players with matches the winner of the previous duel sanctions the next one. When no more matches exist, the player who most recently lost a duel continues play as normal.
- Ultra Disrespect: In this version the totem is essentially treated as a deity, with disrespectful language or jokes targeted at it, as well as touching it in any way besides to resolve a match, constituting the same punishment (taking all discarded cards) as if one had knocked it over or placed it upside-down.
- "B-11 rules": In this version of the game, the player who touched the totem last is responsible for any disrespectful actions, rather than the person that caused it to fall. This can lead to situations where one player physically manipulates another into disrespect, adding a new layer to the game.

== Wii version ==
Jungle Speed
- Developer: Next Level Games
- Publisher: Playful Entertainment
- Platform: Wii (WiiWare)
- Release: NA: January 12, 2009; PAL: March 13, 2009
- Genre: Card games
- Modes: Single-player, Multiplayer

A Jungle Speed video game developed by Canadian studio Next Level Games and published by Playful Entertainment was released on Nintendo Wii's WiiWare service in North America on January 12, 2009, and in the PAL regions on March 13, 2009. The game is playable with up to 8 players, with two players able to share a Wii Remote/Nunchuk combo. The game adds several new elements, such as optional effects that makes it difficult for players to see the cards.

=== Reception ===
The Wii version of the game has received fairly positive reviews, garnering a Metacritic score of 76/100. IGN gave it an 8.0, citing it as a truly addictive multiplayer title, but not worth getting for single player. GamesRadar gave the game 6/10, saying it is not much fun alone. Wiiloveit.com awarded it with a 26/30, claiming it was a "strong multiplayer title for the system" with "very few flaws to speak of".

== Reviews ==
- Pyramid
- Family Games: The 100 Best
