= Mystery of the Abbey =

Board game

- Box cover
- Designers: Bruno Faidutti & Serge Laget
- Illustrators: Julien Delval, Emanuel Roudier, Cyrille Daujean
- Publishers: MultiSim (1998); Days of Wonder (2003)
- Languages: English, French, German, Spanish, Italian, Dutch
- Players: 3–6
- Playing time: 60–90 minutes
- Age range: 8 +
- Skills: Deduction

Mystery of the Abbey is a board game designed by Bruno Faidutti, illustrated by Julien Delval, Emanuel Roudier and Cyrille Daujean as graphic designer. Originally published in French by MultiSim in 1998 under the name Meurtre à l'Abbaye (Murder at the Abbey), Faidutti's game was republished as Mystery of the Abbey by Days of Wonder with new graphic design in 2003.

== Gameplay ==
In Mystery of the Abbey, each player plays the role of a monk seeking to solve a murder in an abbey along the lines of the 1980 novel The Name of the Rose. The game is similar to Cluedo in that the objective is to identify a murderer by process of elimination by moving from room to room in a monastery and asking questions of other players in order to force them to reveal information that will disqualify potential suspects.

Unlike Cluedo, a player, on their turn, can ask any question to any player provided the response does not include a suspect's name. The person being asked the question may choose to answer or otherwise refuse by putting a finger to their lips (i.e., taking a vow of silence). If the player does elect to answer the question, they then have the right to immediately ask their own question to the first player.

Players use the suspects' characteristics to help identify the murderer. The 24 suspects are differentiated by their association with one of three religious orders (Franciscan, Benedictine and Templar), their title (Father, Brother and Novice), whether they are wearing a hood, whether they have a beard, and whether they are fat or thin.

=== Theme and Additional Components ===
Game rules, special cards and other elements are designed around the theme of the monastery and monastic life. Although most of these can directly impact the outcome of the game, some are intended to simply add an element of fun and atmosphere (for example, one card calls for all questions in the next round to be asked in Gregorian chant).

== Reviews ==
- Pyramid

== Awards and honors ==
- 2003 Today's Parent - "Top Toy Guide"
- 2003 Brett & Board Family Game of the Year
- 2004 Lucca Games Best Translated Game
- 2004 Games Magazine - "Games 100"
- 2005 Juego del Año Finalist
