= Colosseum (board game) =

2007 board game

- Designers: Markus Lübke & Wolfgang Kramer
- Illustrators: Julien Delval]], Cyrille Daujean
- Publishers: Days of Wonder
- Publication: 2007
- Languages: English, French, German
- Players: 3–5
- Playing time: 60–90 minutes
- Age range: 10 +

Colosseum is a board game by Markus Lübke and Wolfgang Kramer, published in 2007 by Days of Wonder and illustrated by Julien Delval and Cyrille Daujean. In the game, players attempt to attract the most spectators to the events in their arena.

== Gameplay ==
The game is played in rounds, each round consisting of five phases (except the last round, when phase 5 is not played). In each round, one player is the first player, who does every phase first. The first player changes every round.

Each player has an arena where the events are performed, and starts with two possible events to perform. Every event requires a different combination of asset tokens, small squares depicting various people, animals, and objects that would be used in a performance; players start with some of these and can acquire more during the game.

=== Investing ===
In the first phase, players can invest. There are four choices:

1. Expanding the arena, which allows better events to be performed and increases the chances of a noble landing there.
2. Constructing an emperor's loge, which allows the player to roll two dice instead of only one when moving nobles.
3. Buying a season ticket, which is worth five additional spectators.
4. Purchasing a new event, all of which require the arena to be expanded at least once. Some require two expansions.

=== Buying Asset Tokens ===
There are five markets in the center of the board, each containing three asset tokens. Each player has a chance to initiate auctions for markets; however, no player can win more than one auction.

=== Trading Asset Tokens ===
Players can trade, buy, or sell asset tokens at this point.

=== Event ===
The player rolls a die (two dice with an emperor's loge) and moves any noble clockwise. If two dice are rolled, they can be combined or split between two nobles. Any noble in a colosseum is worth additional spectators. If a noble ends on certain spaces, the player receives an emperor medal, which can be used for various purposes.

At that point the number of spectators is counted. The player receives that many coins. Like in many Days of Wonder board games, the score is marked around the edge of the board with small wooden pieces. A player's score is the maximum number of spectators attracted to one event.

=== Closing ceremonies ===
Every player must discard one asset token used in the last event. The leading player earns a podium, worth three additional spectators in every later round. The losing player requests from the winning player one asset token.

== Reception ==
=== Reviews ===
- Rebel Times #3

== Awards and honors ==
- 2007 Dice Tower Awards: Nominee for Best Artwork
- 2007 Golden Geek Best Board Game Artwork/Presentation Nominee
- 2007 Golden Geek Best Family Board Game Nominee
- 2007 Golden Geek Best Gamer's Board Game Nominee
- 2007 International Gamers Awards - General Strategy; Multi-player Nominee
- 2008 Golden Geek Best Board Game Artwork/Presentation Nominee
- 2008 Golden Geek Best Family Board Game Nominee
