= Days of Wonder =

Board game publisher

- Type: Private
- Industry: Board games
- Founded: 2002; 24 years ago
- Founder: Eric Hautemont; Mark Kaufmann; Yann Corno
- Headquarters: Los Altos, California, U.S.
- Area served: International
- Parent: Asmodee (2014–present)

Days of Wonder is a board game publisher founded in 2002 and owned by Asmodee Group since 2014. Days of Wonder distributes its games to 25 countries. It specializes in German-style board games and has branched out to include some online games. Days of Wonder has published games in several languages including English, Dutch, French, German, Russian, and Greek. Days of Wonder was co-founded by Eric Hautemont, Mark Kaufmann and Yann Corno.

== History ==
Days of Wonder was founded in 2002 by Mark Kaufmann, Eric Hautemont and Yann Corno. It released its first game, Gang of Four, in 2002. In March 2004, the company released Ticket to Ride, designed by Alan R. Moon. In 2004, Ticket to Ride was awarded the Spiel des Jahres (Game of the Year). In 2006, the company released a digital version of Ticket to Ride. Also in 2006, the company's game Shadows Over Camelot was named the Best Fantasy Game at the 2006 Spiel des Jahres.

In 2009, Smallworld received three awards including "Best Game of the Year", "Best Family Game", and "Best Game Artwork" from the Dice Tower Gaming Awards.

In 2014, Days of Wonder was acquired by French game distributor Asmodee Group.

== Games published ==
Below are all of the games published by Days of Wonder from 2002 to 2018:

=== Small box games ===
  - Fist of Dragonstones (Bruno Faidutti and Michael Schacht; 2005)
  - Queen's Necklace (Bruno Faidutti and Bruno Cathala; 2003)
  - Gambit 7 (Dominic Crapuchettes); 2008)
- Fictionaire Series:
  - Fictionaire: Fool Science (Hervé Marly; 2010)
  - Fictionaire: Tall Tales (Hervé Marly; 2010)
  - Fictionaire: Naturals (Hervé Marly; 2010)
  - Fictionaire: Classic Encyclopedia (Hervé Marly; 2010)

=== Large box games ===
  - Mystery of the Abbey (Bruno Faidutti and Serge Laget; 2003)
  - Pirate's Cove (Paul Randles and Daniel Stahl; 2003)
  - Shadows Over Camelot (Bruno Cathala and Serge Laget; 2005)
  - Shadows over Camelot: Merlin's Company (Bruno Cathala and Serge Laget; 2008)
  - Cleopatra and the Society of Architects (Bruno Cathala and Ludovic Maublanc; 2006)
  - Colosseum (Markus Lübke and Wolfgang Kramer; 2007)
  - Mystery Express (Serge Laget and Antoine Bauza; 2010)
  - Cargo Noir (Serge Laget; 2011)
  - Relic Runners (Matthew Dunstan; 2013)
  - Five Tribes (Bruno Cathala; 2014)
  - Five Tribes: The Artisans of Naqala (Bruno Cathala; 2015)
  - Five Tribes: Whims of the Sultan (Bruno Cathala; 2017)
  - Quadropolis (François Gandon; 2016)
  - Quadropolis: Public Service (François Gandon; 2017)
  - Yamataï (Bruno Cathala; 2017)
  - The River (Sébastien Pauchon, Ismaël Perrin; 2018)
  - Corinth (Sébastien Pauchon; 2019)
  - Heat: Pedal to the Metal (2022)

=== Ticket to Ride ===
- Ticket to Ride stand alone boxes:
  - Ticket to Ride (Alan R. Moon; 2004)
  - Ticket to Ride: Europe (Alan R. Moon; 2005)
  - Ticket to Ride: Märklin (Alan R. Moon; 2006)
  - Ticket to Ride Nordic Countries (Alan R. Moon; 2007)
  - Ticket to Ride: Deutschland (Alan R. Moon; 2012)
  - Ticket to Ride 10th Anniversary Edition (Alan R. Moon, 2014)
  - Ticket to Ride: Rails and Sails (Alan R. Moon; 2016)
  - Ticket to Ride: First Journey (Alan R. Moon; 2016)
  - Ticket to Ride: First Journey: Europe (Alan R. Moon; 2017)
- Ticket to Ride Map Collection:
  - Ticket to Ride Switzerland (Alan R. Moon; 2007)
  - Ticket to Ride Asia (Alan R. Moon; 2011)
  - Ticket to Ride India/Switzerland (Alan R. Moon; 2011)
  - Ticket to Ride Heart of Africa (Alan R. Moon; 2012)
  - Ticket to Ride Nederland (Alan R. Moon; 2013)
  - Ticket to Ride United Kingdom (Alan R. Moon; 2015)
- Ticket to Ride expansions:
  - Mystery Train (Alan R. Moon; 2004)
  - Ticket to Ride The Dice Expansion (Alan R. Moon; 2008)
  - Ticket to Ride 1910 (Alan R. Moon; 2006)
  - Ticket to Ride Europa 1912 (Alan R. Moon; 2009)
  - Alvin & Dexter - Monster expansion (Alan R. Moon; 2011)
  - Ticket to Ride Halloween Freighter (Alan R. Moon; 2012)
  - Character Score Markers (2013)
  - Extra colored train sets - 5#colors (2013)
  - Ticket to Ride Deutschland 1902 (Alan R. Moon; 2015)
  - Orient Express -mini expansion (Alan R. Moon; 2015)

=== Memoir '44 ===
  - Memoir '44 (Richard Borg; 2004)
- Memoir '44 expansions packs:
  - Terrain Pack Expansion (Richard Borg; 2005)
  - Eastern Front Expansion (Richard Borg; 2005)
  - Winter/Desert Board (Richard Borg; 2005)
  - Pacific Theater Expansion (Richard Borg; 2006)
  - Air Pack (Richard Borg; 2007)
  - Mediterranean Theater (Richard Borg; 2008)
  - Operation Overlord (Richard Borg; 2008)
  - Breakthrough Kit (Richard Borg; 2010)
  - Winter Wars (Richard Borg; 2010)
  - Equipment Pack (Richard Borg; 2012)
- Memoir '44 Campaigns:
  - Campaign Book Vol.1 (Richard Borg; 2009)
  - Campaign Book Vol.2 (Richard Borg; 2011)
  - Vercors Campaign (Richard Borg; 2009)
  - The Invasion of Crete (Richard Borg; 2011)
- Memoir '44 Battle maps:
  - M'44 BattleMap - Sword of Stalingrad (Richard Borg; 2009)
  - M'44 BattleMap - Disaster at Dieppe (Richard Borg; 2010)
  - M'44 BattleMap - Hedgerow Hell (Richard Borg; 2008)
  - M'44 BattleMap - Tigers in the Snow (Richard Borg; 2009)
  - M'44 BattleMap - D-Day Landings (Richard Borg; 2014)
  - M'44 BattleMap - The Battles of Khalkhin-Gol (Richard Borg; 2016)
- Memoir '44 misc. expansions:
  - M'44 Campaign Bag (2007)
  - M'44 Tactics & Strategy Guide (Alexis "Praxeo" Beuve; 2011)
  - Equipment Pack Bonus Scenarios (Richard Borg; 2012)

=== Small World ===
- Small World stand alone boxes:
  - Small World (Philippe Keyaerts; 2009)
  - Small World Underground (Philippe Keyaerts; 2011)
  - Small World Designer Edition (Philippe Keyaerts; 2015)
  - Small World of Warcraft (Philippe Keyaerts; 2020)
- Small World new races & powers expansions:
  - Grand Dames of Small World (Philippe Keyaerts; 2009)
  - Cursed! (Philippe Keyaerts; 2009)
  - Be Not Afraid… (Philippe Keyaerts; 2010)
  - Royal Bonus (Philippe Keyaerts; 2015)
  - Spider's Web (Philippe Keyaerts; 2015)
- Small World misc. expansions:
  - Small World Realms (Philippe Keyaerts; 2012)
  - SW 6 Player Map (Philippe Keyaerts; 2013)
  - Leaders of Small World (Philippe Keyaerts; 2009)
  - Tales and Legends (Philippe Keyaerts; 2010)
  - Necromancer Island (Philippe Keyaerts; 2010)
  - Small World Tunnels (Philippe Keyaerts; 2011)
  - Small World Encyclopedia (Philippe Keyaerts; 2015)
  - Small World River World (Philippe Keyaerts; 2016)
  - Small World Sky Islands (Philippe Keyaerts, T. Alex Davis; 2017)

=== BattleLore ===
  - BattleLore (Richard Borg; 2006)
  - Battlelore Epic (Richard Borg; 2007)
  - Call to Arms (Richard Borg; 2007)
  - Dwarven Battalion (Richard Borg; 2007)
  - Scottish Wars (Richard Borg; 2007)
  - Goblin Skirmishers (Richard Borg; 2007)
  - Goblin Marauders (Richard Borg; 2007)
  - The Hundred Years' War - Crossbows & Polearms (Richard Borg; 2007)
  - Hill Giant - Promo mini (Richard Borg; 2007)
  - Earth Elemental - Promo min (Richard Borg; 2007)
  - For Troll And Country - Battlemap (David Pernot; 2007)

=== Card games ===
  - Gang of Four (Lee Yih; 2002)
  - Gang of Four recharge pack (Lee Yih; 2002)
  - Gang of Four: redesign 2d Edition (Lee Yih; 2005)
  - Terra (Bruno Faidutti; 2003)
  - Ticket to Ride: The Card Game (Alan R. Moon; 2008)
  - Shadows over Camelot: The Card Game (Bruno Cathala and Serge Laget; 2012)

=== The Art off Small World ===
  - SW Amazon Statue (2013)
  - SW Skeleton Statue (2013)
  - SW Spiderine Statue (2013)
  - SW Wizard Statue (2013)

=== Digital games ===
  - Ticket to Ride - Online (Days of Wonder; 2012)
  - Ticket to Ride - Xbox (Next Level Games; 2008)
  - Ticket to Ride - iOs (Days of Wonder; 2011)
  - Ticket to Ride - Mac/PC (Days of Wonder; 2012)
  - Ticket to Ride - Linux (Days of Wonder; 2013)
  - Ticket to Ride - Android (Days of Wonder; 2013)
  - Memoir'44 - Mac/PC (Days of Wonder)
  - Gang of Four - Online (Days of Wonder)
  - Small World - iOs (Days of Wonder)
  - Small World2- Mac/PC (Days of Wonder)
  - Small World2 - iOs (Days of Wonder)
  - Small World2 - Android (Days of Wonder)

== Awards and honors ==
Ticket to Ride
- 2004 Spiel des Jahres
- 2004 Origins Awards Best Board Game Winner
- 2004 Japan Boardgame Prize Best Advanced Game Winner
- 2004 Jeux sur un plateau gold award
- 2004 Bruno Faidutti - Game of the Year
- 2004 Parents' Choice Foundation - Silver Honor
- 2004 Games Magazine - Game 100
- 2004 Best Family Game - Boardgamerating.com
- 2004 Meeples' Choice Award
- 2004 2d for Schweizer Spielepreis - Family Games
- 2004 6th - Deutscher Spiel Preis
- 2004 France - Tric Trac Nominee
- 2004 Nederlandse Spellenprijs Nominee
- 2004 International Gamers Awards - General Strategy; Multi-player Nominee
- 2005 Diana Jones Award for Excellence in Gaming - Winner
- 2005 France - As d'Or jeu de l'année - Cannes
- 2005 Årets Spel Best Family Game Winner
- 2005 Juego del Año Winner
- 2005 Vuoden Peli Family Game of the Year Winner
- 2006 Hra roku Winner
- 2006 Japan Boardgame Prize Best Japanese Game Winner
- 2008 Ludoteca Ideale Official Selection
- 2010 Hungarian Board Game Award Nominee

Ticket to Ride Europe

- 2005 International Gamers Awards - General Strategy; Multi-player
- 2005 Japan Boardgame Prize Best Advanced Game Nominee
- 2005 Italy game of the Year
- 2005 Austria - Nominated Game Academia selection
- 2006 Årets Spill Best Family Game Winner
- 2013 Hungarian Board Game Award Special Prize Winner

Ticket to Ride: The Card Game

- 2008 Fairplay À la carte Winner
- 2008 Golden Geek Best Card Game Nominee
- 2009 Boardgames Australia Awards Best International Game Nominee
- 2009 Golden Geek Best Card Game Nominee
- 2009 JoTa Best Card Game Nominee

Ticket to Ride: Map expansion #5 United Kingdom

- 2015 Golden Geek Best Expansion Nominee
- 2015 Golden Geek Best Expansion Winner

Ticket to ride iOs

- 2012 Pocket Gamer Awards Best Strategy/Simulation Game
- 2012 Pocket Gamer Award Reader's choice
- 2011 Gamzebo.com - Best Board and Card Games

Ticket to Ride: 10th Anniversary

- 2014 The Dice Tower - Best Game Reprint
- 2014 Best Family Board Game Nominee
- 2014 Best Board Game Artwork & Presentation Nominee

Small World

- 2009 Austria - Game Academy Spiele Hit Expert Category
- 2009 Belgium Joker Award
- 2009 5th - Deutscher Spiel Preis
- 2009 Jeux sur un plateau gold award
- 2009 France - Gold Tric Trac
- 2009 Bruno Faidutti - Game of the Year
- 2009 International Gamers Awards Nominee
- 2009 Golden Geek Best Board Game Artwork/Presentation Nominee
- 2009 Golden Geek Best Family Board Game Nominee
- 2009 Golden Geek Best Gamers' Board Game Nominee
- 2009 Golden Geek Best Wargame Nominee
- 2009 Japan Boardgame Prize Voters' Selection Nominee
- 2009 Meeples' Choice Award
- 2010 France - As d'Or jeu de l'année: Jury Award - Cannes
- 2010 Games Magazine - Traditional Game of the Year
- 2010 Boardgames Australia Awards Best International Game Nominee
- 2010 Games Magazine Game of the Year Winner
- 2010 Golden Geek Best Board Game Artwork/Presentation Nominee
- 2010 Golden Geek Best Family Board Game Nominee
- 2010 Golden Geek Best Strategy Board Game Nominee
- 2010 Golden Geek Best Wargame Nominee
- 2010 Gouden Ludo Nominee
- 2010 Guldbrikken Special Jury Prize
- 2010 JoTa Best Artwork Nominee
- 2010 JoTa Best Family Board Game Nominee
- 2010 JoTa Best Family Board Game Audience Award
- 2010 JoTa Best Family Board Game Critic Award
- 2010 JoTa Best Wargame Audience Award
- 2010 JoTa Best Wargame Critic Award
- 2011 Ludoteca Ideale Official Selection Winner
- 2013 Gra Roku Game of the Year Winner

Shadows over Camelot

- 2005 Japan Boardgame of the Year Best Advanced Game Winner
- 2005 Meeples' Choice Award
- 2005 USA - Origins Award best Board game of the year
- 2005 Jeux sur un plateau gold award
- 2005 Nominee International Gamers Awards
- 2005 Austria - Game Academy Spiele Hit Expert Category
- 2005 France - Bronze Tric Trac
- 2005 Bruno Faidutti - Game of the Year
- 2005 7th - Deutscher Spiel Preis
- 2006 Inquest Best Tabeltop Gamers Award
- 2006 Spiel des Jahres Fantasy Game
- 2006 France - As d'Or Nominee
- 2006 Golden Geek Best Family Board Game Nominee
- 2006 Golden Geek Best Gamer's Board Game Nominee
- 2006 Golden Geek Best Light / Party Game Nominee
- 2008 Jota Best Cooperative Board Game Nominee

BattleLore

- 2007 Golden Geek Best 2-Player Board Game Winner
- 2007 Golden Geek Best Board Game Artwork/Presentation Nominee
- 2007 Golden Geek Best Board Game Artwork/Presentation Winner
- 2007 Golden Geek Best Wargame Nominee
- 2007 Hra roku Nominee
- 2007 International Gamers Award - General Strategy: Two-players
- 2007 France - Nominee Tric Trac
- 2008 Hra roku Nominee

Memoir '44

- 2004 Charles S. Roberts Best World War II Boardgame Nominee
- 2004 International Gamers Awards - General Strategy; Two-players
- 2004 France - Nominee Tric Trac
- 2005 Årets Spill Best Strategy Game Winner
- 2005 Games Magazine Best New Historical Simulation Game Winner
- 2005 Wargamer.com Award of Excellence
- 2005 Boardgameratings.com Best 2 player Game

Pirate's Cove

- 2003 France - Nominee Tric Trac Silver Tric Trac
- 2002 Bruno Faidutti - Game of the Year

Mystery of the Abbey

- 2003 Today's Parents - 'Top Toy Guide'
- 2003 Brett & Board Family Game of the Year
- 2004 Lucca Games Best Translated Game
- 2004 Games Magazine - 'Games 100'
- 2005 Juego del Año Finalist

Colosseum

- 2007 10th - Deutscher Spiel Preis
- 2007 The Dice Tower - Nominee for Best Artwork
- 2007 Golden Geek Best Board Game Artwork/Presentation Nominee
- 2007 Golden Geek Best Family Board Game Nominee
- 2007 Golden Geek Best Gamer's Board Game Nominee
- 2007 International Gamers Awards - General Strategy; Multi-player Nominee
- 2008 Golden Geek Best Board Game Artwork/Presentation Nominee
- 2008 Golden Geek Best Family Board Game Nominee

Cleopatra and the Society of Architects

- 2006 Golden Geek Best Family Board Game Nominee
- 2006 Spiel der Spiele Hit mit Freunden Recommended
- 2007 Golden Geek Best Board Game Artwork/Presentation Nominee
- 2007 Golden Geek Best Family Board Game Nominee

Relic Runners

- 2013 Golden Geek Best Family Board Game Nominee

Cargo Noir

- 2011 Best International Boardgames Australia

Gang of Four

- 1997 Super As d'or in Cannes
- 2003 France - Nominee Bronze Tric Trac

Five Tribes

- 2014 Golden Geek Best Strategy Board Game
- 2014 France - Tric Trac d'or
- 2014 Board game Quest Awards Winner - Game of the Year
- 2014 The Dice Tower - Best Strategy Game
- 2014 The Dice Tower - Nominee Best Game of the Year
- 2014 Jocul Anului in Romania 2014 – Avansati
- 2015 Grand Prix As d'Or

Quadropolis

- 2016 Gouden Ludo Nominee

== See also ==
- Going Cardboard
