= Castle (card game) =

Board game

- Designers: Bruno Faidutti; Serge Laget; Emmanuel Roudier (Artist)
- Publishers: Descartes Editeur; Eurogames; Jeux Descartes
- Players: 2–5
- Setup time: 5 minutes
- Playing time: 30 minutes
- Chance: Medium
- Skills: Strategic thought

Castle (sometimes known as Palace, not to be confused with Palace aka Shithead) is a card game designed by Bruno Faidutti, Francesca Flores, and Serge Laget. Art by Emmanuel Roudier. Played with 2-5 players. It is a shedding card game, i.e. the winning player is the one who disposes of all of their cards first.

== Game play ==
Players are given a set of square cards which are to be played onto the table, which has a cardboard castle battlement layout.

Cards are played into one of four regions:

- in the courtyard,
- on the battlements,
- on the towers, or
- outside the castle.

When played, the cards will usually allow the player to take some sort of special action, which is unique to the card.

=== End Game ===
The first player to rid himself of all his cards wins.

== Awards ==
Castle won the 2000 Concours International de Créateurs de Jeux de Société.
