= Jaipur (card game) =

2009 two-player card game

- Box cover of the GameWorks 2009 edition
- Designers: Sébastien Pauchon
- Publishers: Asmodee; GameWorks
- Players: 2
- Setup time: 5 minutes
- Playing time: 30 minutes
- Chance: medium
- Age range: 12 and up

Jaipur is a two-player card game created by Sébastien Pauchon in 2009 and published by Asmodee. Players assume the roles of powerful merchants in Jaipur, the capital of Rajasthan. The aim is to receive two "seals of excellence" and be invited to the court of the Maharaja. The game focuses on buying, exchanging, and selling at better prices, all while keeping an eye on both your camel herds.

== Gameplay ==
Each turn, a player chooses between acquiring new goods from the market by using "tokens representing money", or selling goods in exchange for tokens. Selling a larger batch of goods earns a bonus.

=== Rules ===
At the start of the game, each player is dealt five cards, and the market consists of five face-up cards, usually including camels. On a turn, a player must either take cards or sell cards, but not both. When taking cards, a player may take one goods card, take several goods cards and exchange the same number of cards from hand, or take all camels from the market. Camels are placed in a herd in front of the player and do not count toward the seven-card hand limit. When selling, a player chooses one type of goods and discards one or more cards of that type to receive the matching tokens in descending order of value. Selling three or more cards also earns a bonus token, while diamonds, gold, and silver must be sold in groups of at least two cards. A round ends when three goods-token piles have been depleted or when the deck can no longer refill the market. Players then total the value of their goods tokens and bonus tokens, and the player with the most camels receives the camel bonus token. The winner of the round receives a Seal of Excellence; the first player to collect two seals wins the game.

== Reception ==
Overall, the board game has received favorable reviews, many acknowledging its simplicity, yet sufficient depth. Shut Up & Sit Down have suggested that "great game for seasoned vets but also something you could easily introduce to people who don’t play a lot" whereas iSlayTheDragon said "Jaipur is a blast to play". Board Game Land has suggested that the game was "one of the top card games for couples". Jaipur has continued to be a popular game with recommendations into 2020 as well as being part of the Mind Sports Olympiad 2020 competition.

== Honors ==
- 2010 Fairplay À la carte Winner (Germany)
- 2010 Golden Geek Best 2-Player Board Game Nominee (USA)
- 2010 Golden Geek Best Card Game Nominee (USA)
- 2010 International Gamers Award - General Strategy: Two-players (Global)
- 2010 Lys Grand Public Finalist (France)
- 2010 Spiel des Jahres Recommended (Germany)
- 2011 Games Magazine Best New Family Card Game Winner (USA)
- 2014 Juego del Año Winner (Spain)
