= Mission: Red Planet =

Mission: Red Planet is a 2005 space-themed board game for 3–5 players designed by Bruno Cathala and Bruno Faidutti and published by Asmodee.

== Reception ==
=== Reviews ===
- Games 228 (Vol 31, #2) March 2007
- Rebel Times #6
- RPGnet review by Tom Vasel
- Shut Up & Sit Down
- Świat Gier Planszowych #2
- The DiceTower (multiple reviews)
