= Serge Laget =

French board game designer (died 2023)

- Born: 13 February 1959; Oloron-Sainte-Marie, France
- Died: 23 January 2023 (aged 63); Carpentras, France
- Occupation: Board game designer

Serge Charles Jean Laget (13 February 1959 – 23 January 2023) was a French board game designer. He also worked as an education advisor near Avignon.

== Biography ==
Serge Laget and Alain Munoz designed the game Le Gang des Traction-Avant from International Team, and they were awarded the Pion d'Or 84 for the game.

In 2003, Laget created the board game Mare Nostrum, and its successor, Mare Nostrum: Mythology Expansion, two years later. In 2011, he created Cargo Noir and, in 2020, Nidavellir.

Serge Laget died in January 2023, at the age of 63.

== Collaborations ==
=== With Bruno Faidutti ===
- Mystery of the Abbey (1996)
- Castle (2000)
- Kheops (2008)
- Ad Astra (2009)
- ARGO (2016)

=== With Bruno Cathala ===
- Shadows over Camelot (2005)
- Wicked Witches Way (2006)
- Senji (2008)
- Mundus Novus (2011)
