= Cyclades (game) =

Cyclades is a 2009 board game published by Matagot.

== Gameplay ==
Cyclades is a game in which players compete to be the first to build two cities by bidding each round for the favor of different Greek gods, whose unique powers grant military, naval, economic, and scholarly advantages needed to win.

== Reviews ==
- Black Gate
- Rebel Times #31
- Rebel Times #44 (as "Cyklady")
- Świata Gier Planszowych #17
