= Citadels (card game) =

Card game

- Box of the French 3rd edition of Citadels
- Designers: Bruno Faidutti
- Illustrators: Julien Delval, Florence Magnin, Jean-Louis Mourier, Jesper Ejsing, Bjarne Hansen. As graphic designer : Cyrille Daujean, Brian Schomburg, Scott Nicely, Richard Spicer, Christian T. Petersen.
- Publication: 2000
- Players: 2–8 (in later editions)
- Setup time: 10 minutes
- Playing time: 45–60 minutes
- Age range: 10 +
- Skills: Strategic thought, bluffing, diplomacy

Citadels is a German-style card game, designed by Bruno Faidutti, originally published in French as Citadelles by MultiSim in 2000, illustrated by Julien Delval, Florence Magnin, Jean-Louis Mourier and Cyrille Daujean as graphic designer for the first edition. Sometime later, Citadels was published in German as Ohne Furcht und Adel, which means "Without Fear or Nobility".

Citadels was a finalist for the 2000 Spiel des Jahres award. The Dutch version, Machiavelli, won the Dutch game prize (Nederlandse spellenprijs) in 2001.

== Gameplay ==
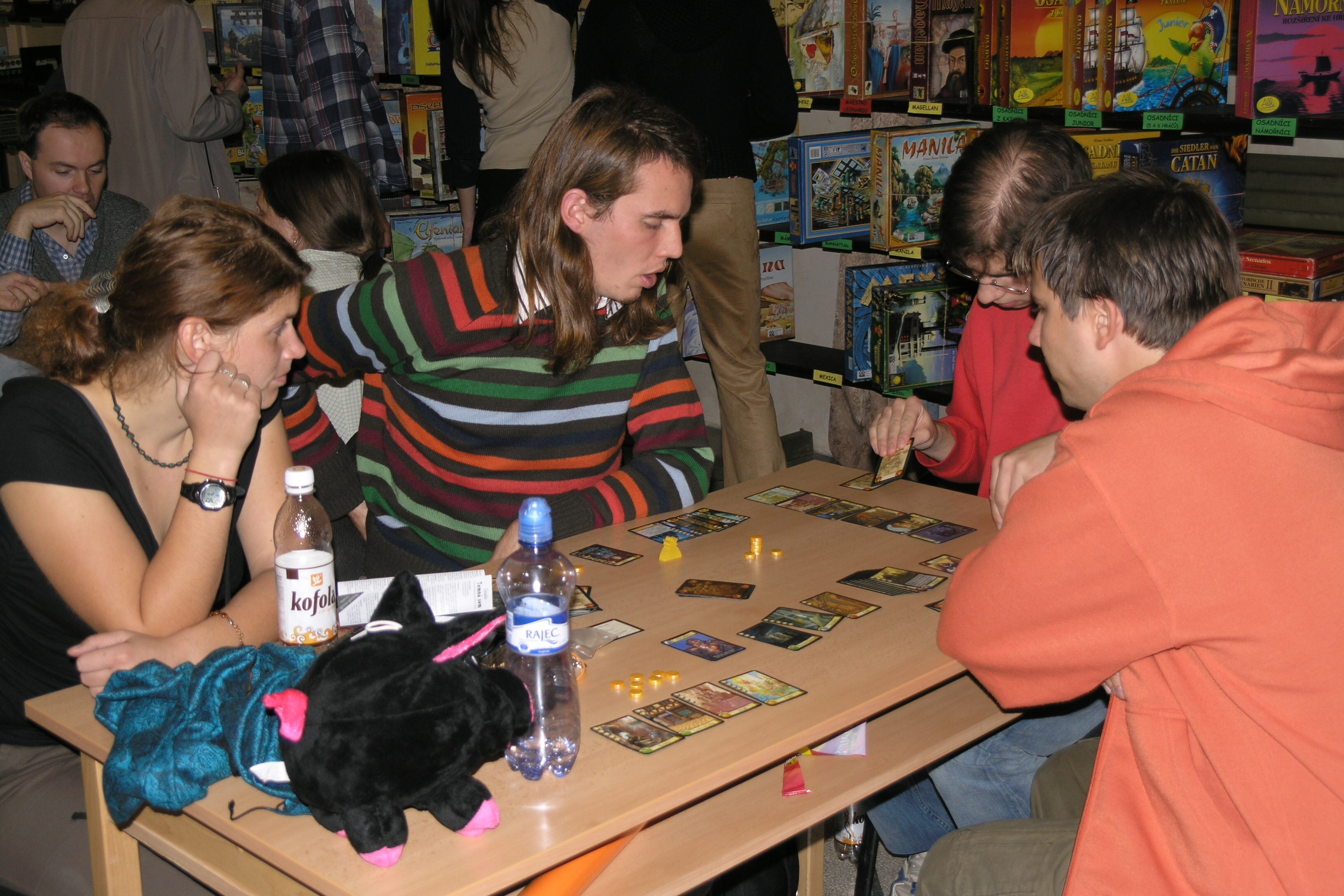
Citadels

The basic goal is to collect gold coins and pay to build district cards. The value of each card is equal to its points at the end of the game. The player with the most points at the end of the game wins.

Gameplay consists of multiple rounds with two phases: character selection and actions.

=== Character Selection Phase ===
Characters are selected through a partially secret draft. Characters determine the turn order during the action phase, each has a different in-game ability, and four special characters provide the opportunity to collect extra gold.

Beginning with the player possessing the crown counter, players take it in turn to choose a character card secretly before passing the hand to the next player.

To add further strategy to the game, only some characters are available each round. Unavailable characters are selected randomly, and may be revealed or hidden, depending on the number of people playing. The first player to draft always knows the first face down character that is out of play and the last player to draft always knows the last card that is placed face down after the draft.

Player count determines how many characters out of eight are in play and how many characters that are not in play are hidden or visible:

- In special 2-3 player versions of the game each player controls multiple characters during the action phase. Rules vary as to which cards are placed out of play.
- In 4-7 player games each player controls one character during the action phase.
  - In 4 player games two cards are placed face up and one face down before drafting.
  - In 5 player games one card is placed face up and one face down before drafting.
  - In 6-7 player games one card is placed face down before drafting.
    - The 7th player has a choice between the face down card and the last card available at the end of the draft.
- Special Rule: The king card may never be displayed face up before drafting and must be shuffled back into the Character Deck then replaced.

=== Action Phase ===
After character selection is finished, characters are called out in order of the numbers on the top left corner of each card to take their actions.

Characters that are out of play are skipped and the next character takes their action phase. The actions involve: taking income (either two gold coins or looking at two district cards and keeping one), building district cards, and using character-specific abilities. Special characters that are labeled as yellow, blue, green, or red may take coins equal to the amount of buildings with the corresponding color they have built into their tableau (i.e. personal playing field).

Characters are then reshuffled and a new turn begins with players selecting new characters in the same process.

=== Ending the Game ===
When a player 'builds' their eighth district card in their tableau, the game ends and points are tallied. Bonus points are awarded for building the maximum 8 districts, being the first to do so, and having a district of each possible color (purple, yellow, red, blue, green).

There are several cards that affect the end of the game. A player can build the "Belltower" district card to cause the game to end with 7 districts instead of 8. This affects the appropriate bonus points and the warlord/diplomat abilities.

=== Characters ===
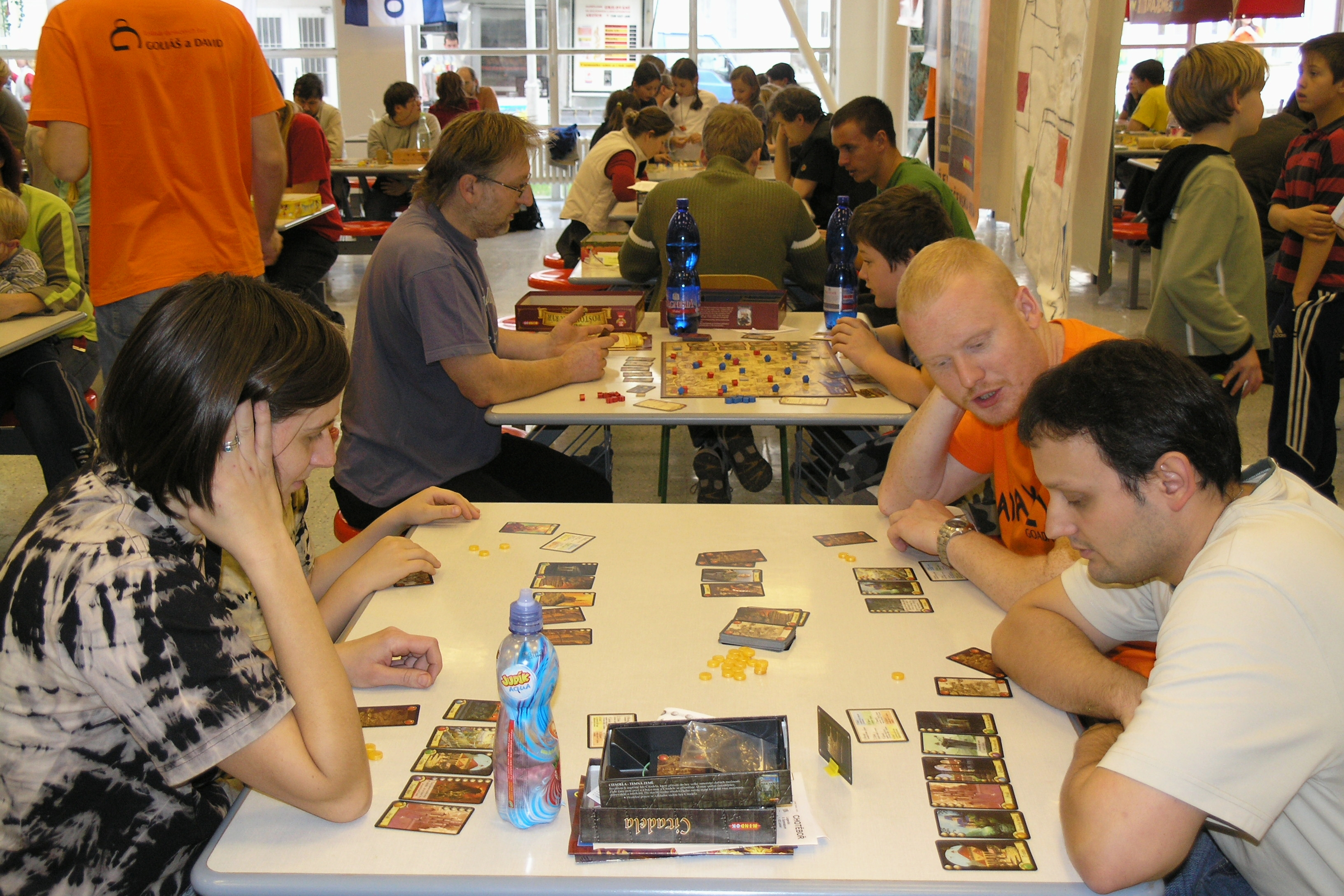
Citadels

The abilities associated with each character vary and include defensive, offensive, and bonus earning powers. The original set contained eight character cards:

- Assassin (No. 1) - May name one character (not player). That character may not take their turn this round.
- Thief (No. 2) - May name one character (not player). At the beginning of their turn, that character must give the Thief all of their gold pieces (excluding income of the current round).
- Magician (No. 3) - May swap hands with one player, or discard any number of cards and draw an equal number of cards.
- King (No. 4 and Yellow) May collect gold pieces equal to the number of yellow buildings in their tableau (i.e. in their personal playing field). Receives the crown token and begins the character selection phase next round.
- Bishop (No. 5 and Blue) - May collect gold pieces equal to the number of blue buildings in their tableau (i.e. in their personal playing field). Is protected from the power of the Warlord, except if the bishop was assassinated.
- Merchant (No. 6 and Green) - May collect gold pieces equal to the number of green buildings in their tableau (i.e. in their personal playing field). Collects an extra gold piece after taking an action during the action phase. (Regardless of if they take gold or cards as income).
- Architect (No. 7) - After taking an action, may take two additional district cards and put both in their hand. May build up to three districts during their turn.
- Warlord (No. 8 and Red) - May collect gold pieces equal to the number of red buildings in their tableau (i.e. in their personal playing field). At the end of their turn, they may destroy one district card in an opponents field. To do so, they must pay gold equal to one less than the cost of building the card. (Ex. A card that cost one gold to build is free to destroy. A card that cost four gold to build will cost three gold to destroy.) They may not, however, destroy a district in a city that is already completed by having eight districts.

== Expansions & New Editions ==
Over the years, there have been expansion packs and new editions of Citadels released. The difference between the two is that an expansion is added into a preexisting version of the game and a new edition is a complete rework of the game itself.

Currently, the base English language edition of Citadels is called "Citadels Deluxe" and is sold with past expansion sets already included. These include extra character and district cards and the new markers associated with these new cards. It does not include game pieces and mechanics that are specific to the Circus Edition.

=== Additional Character Set Expansion ===
The expansion set includes a set of eight new characters, any of which can be swapped for their numerical counterpart (i.e. a game could not have the Witch and the Assassin, as they are both Character No. 1):

- Witch (No. 1) - May name a character (not player) and take their income. The Witch's turn is postponed until that character's turn. The player with that character may take their income but do nothing else. The Witch's turn resumes with them being able to use the "bewitched" character's ability and build from their own (the Witch's) hand. They may also take any extra income based on the buildings in their own (the Witch's) tableau.
- Tax collector (No. 2) - During any round in which the Tax Collector is in play, each player who builds one or more districts MUST give the Tax Collector 1 gold (if they have one remaining at the end of the turn).
- Wizard (No. 3) - May look at another player's hand and choose a district card. They may add it to their hand or build it immediately IN ADDITION to their normal building that turn.
- Emperor (No. 4 and Yellow) - May collect gold pieces equal to the number of yellow buildings in their tableau (i.e. in their personal playing field). MUST take the crown token (aka first player token) and give it to a different player (not themselves). That player must pay the Emperor 1 gold coin or one card.
- Abbot (No. 5 and Blue) - May collect gold pieces equal to the number of blue buildings in their tableau (i.e. in their personal playing field). Forces the player with the most gold to give them 1 gold.
- Alchemist (No. 6) - DOES NOT collect gold pieces equal to the number of green buildings in their tableau (i.e. in their personal playing field). May retrieve the sum of the gold used to build buildings up to this point during the round. MAY NOT spend more than they have at the start of their turn.
- Navigator (No. 7) - After taking income, receive either four gold or four cards. They MAY NOT build any district cards this turn.
- Diplomat (No. 8 and Red) - May collect gold pieces equal to the number of red buildings in their tableau (i.e. in their personal playing field). May "trade" districts in play with another player by paying the difference between the buildings. IF the building from the Diplomat's tableau is less expensive, no gold is "earned" by trading it with a more expensive building.

It also added two number nine characters that expand the maximum player count to eight and can be used in games of five or more:

- Artist (No. 9) - May "beautify" up to two buildings by placing a gold on them. "Beautified" buildings both cost one more gold to destroy or trade AND score one more point at the end of the game. Each building may only be "beautified" once per game.
- Queen (No. 9) - Receives three gold during their turn if they are sitting next to the player possessing the No. 4 character (King, Emperor, etc.).

=== The Dark City Expansion (2003) ===
An expansion, The Dark City, was released for the game in 2004. The expansion adds 14 new purple district cards, some turn summary cards, and a wooden king token. The German, Dutch, Lithuanian and Estonian language editions of The Dark City also include the nine new character cards from the English-language edition.

=== Circus Edition (2012) ===
This edition of the base game was published in Germany by Hans-im-Glück in 2012 and is not available in English. It contains the base game and 15 new cards of a new type called "action cards". These cards can be used once per turn without costing any gold and offer various tactical advantages - comparable to unique (aka purple) district cards. It does not include the Dark City expansion, which was included with the Fantasy Flight 3rd edition of Citadels.

=== Citadels New Edition (2016) ===
This edition of the game includes characters and districts from the original game, additional character set, and The Dark City. it also added a brand new cast of 9 characters and 12 completely new districts. Players can choose which character combinations they would like to play with and can find recommendations in the rule book.

Lastly, this edition has new artwork. 6 of the 9 new characters were created by a young French player, Robin Corrèze.

New characters:

- Magistrate (No. 1)
- Blackmailer (No. 2)
- Spy (No. 2)
- Seer (No. 3)
- Patrician (No. 4)
- Cardinal (No. 5)
- Trader (No. 6)
- Scholar (No. 7)
- Marshal (No. 8)
- Tax collector (No. 9)*

*In a new version

=== Citadels Revised Edition (2021) ===
This edition of the game reworked the packaging and included updated art.

Its associated "Scenic Route Mini Expansion" was released in partnership with Asmodee's Hobby Next program as a promo item that was only available at participating hobby game stores. It included 14 new "unique district cards."

== Awards and honors ==
- 2000 Fairplay À la carte Winner
- 2000 Meeples' Choice Award
- 2000 Spiel des Jahres Nominee
- 2001 International Gamers Awards - General Strategy; Multi-player Nominee
- 2001 Nederlandse Spellenprijs Winner
- 2007 Golden Geek Best Card Game Nominee

== Reviews ==
- Pyramid

== Online Game ==
- Play-Citadels Online Play Online
