= Asmodee =

Board games publisher and distributor

Asmodee Group AB
- Type: Public
- Traded as: Nasdaq Stockholm: ASMDEE B
- ISIN: SE0023615638
- Industry: Tabletop games
- Founded: 1995; 31 years ago
- Founder: Marc Nunès
- Headquarters: Boulogne-Billancourt, France (operations); Karlstad, Sweden (legal domicile)
- Key people: Lars Wingefors (chairman); Thomas Kœgler (CEO); Andrea Gasparini (CFO)
- Products: Role-playing games, board games, card games
- Revenue: €1.287 billion (2024)
- Operating income: €−710 million (2024)
- Net income: €−541 million (2024)
- Total assets: €3.162 billion (2024)
- Total equity: €1.493 billion (2024)
- Parent: Eurazeo (2014–2018); PAI Partners (2018–2022); Embracer Group (2022–2025)
- Website: corporate.asmodee.com

Asmodee (formerly known as Asmodée Editions) is a French publisher of board games, card games and role-playing games (RPGs). Founded in 1995 to develop their own games and to publish and distribute for other smaller game developers, they have since acquired numerous other board game publishers. A division, Twin Sails Interactive (formerly Asmodee Digital), publishes video game adaptations of Asmodee games.

== History ==
Asmodee was founded in 1995 by Marc Nunès, with the idea to not only develop their own board games but to reach out to other smaller publishers of board games and offer to publish and distribute for them, primarily in France. One of the company's early successes was Jungle Speed, which they acquired in 1998 and promoted heavily to various toy stores and retail outlets in France, selling over 4 million copies. In 2003, the company obtained the rights to publish the French version of the Pokémon Trading Card Game, which further helped in their sales outreach. Around 2007, Nunès directed Asmodee towards the European and international market. The company gained a 40% investment from Montefiore Investment, which helped them acquire additional small publishers. Acquisitions during this period include Esdevium, the largest hobby games distributor in the UK, in 2010.

In January 2014, Asmodee was acquired by the French private equity firm Eurazeo for €143 million. Under Eurazeo's ownership, Asmodée became more active in its acquisitions of other board game publishers and developers. Asmodee currently distributes games under the imprints Descartes Editeur and Eurogames, acquired when they purchased Descartes. However, they have not used these imprints for any original publications since the purchase.

In August 2014, Asmodee agreed to a merger with American board game publishers Days of Wonder. Later that year, they also merged with Fantasy Flight Games.

In January 2016, Asmodee acquired the English language rights to the Catan games from Mayfair Games, creating a new company Catan Studio, Inc. Also on the 27th in that same month, Asmodee announced that they had acquired Nordic/Dutch-based European board games and cards developer Bergsala Enigma which it will be rebranded to its original name Enigma Distribution, thrust Asmodee expanded their operations into Eastern Europe and the first time they entered the Nordic and Dutch game business Two years later Enigma was fully absorbed into Asmodee and announced that they rebranded the company to Asmodee Nordic.

Eurazeo began searching for a potential buyer for Asmodee in early 2018, and announced in July 2018 that it was selling the company to another French private equity firm, PAI Partners at a price of about €1.2 billion. Asmodee launched the book publisher Aconyte in 2020 to publish tie-in works.

In October 2020, Asmodee announced that they sold British-based board game, puzzle and book publishing company The Lagoon Group to American game company University Games and placed Lagoon under their UK-based subsidiary University Games UK.

The company acquired Board Game Arena, a digital tabletop simulator, in February 2021, for which they plan to adapt their games to add to its available library.

In September 2021, PAI Partners announced that Asmodee was up for sale for 2 billion euros. Embracer Group in December 2021 launched a takeover bid for €2.75 billion, which would make it a ninth operating group within Embracer. During this announcement, they also revealed acquiring the online retail site Miniature Market sometime in 2021. Embracer Group officially completed its takeover of Asmodee on 8 March 2022.

After a failed $2 billion investment deal, in April 2024, Embracer Group announced that it would split up into three separate publicly traded companies on the Swedish stock market with Asmodee Group AB, incorporated in Karlstad, Sweden, formed as a holding company to manage all Asmodee assets. In February 2025, Asmodee announced it will start trading at Nasdaq Stockholm, marking the completion of the split from Embracer.

=== Twin Sails Interactive ===
In addition to its physical publishing rights, Asmodee began developing video games based on their board game properties for personal computers and mobile gaming. Many of these games were built atop the software libraries that Days of Wonder had crafted for their digital version of Ticket to Ride. As of January 2017, the company had published digital versions of Mysterium and Potion Explosion in addition to existing titles published by their acquired companies. Philippe Dao, the chief marketing officer for Asmodee Digital, stated that they anticipated to have 20 more games out by the end of 2017.

In October 2017, Asmodee and Fantasy Flight announced the formation of Fantasy Flight Interactive, a division of the merged companies to bring more of Fantasy Flight's physical board games to digital implementations. Among the games, developed by the studio were The Lord of the Rings: Adventure Card Game and The Lord of the Rings: Journeys in Middle-earth. However, as part of company-wide layoffs, the Fantasy Flight Interactive division was closed down in January 2020 and the mobile version of The Lord of the Rings: Adventure Card Game was never released. Following the closure of Fantasy Flight Interactive, by February 2020, Asmodee announced that it was opening up its library of board games to be made into digital versions through licensing options to any developer. On 11 February 2021, Asmodee announced acquisition of digital multiplayer board game platform, Board Game Arena. Asmodee Digital was rebranded as Twin Sails Interactive in August 2022 and spun off from the group in April 2025 in order to refocus on Asmodee's core business.

== Products ==
Games published by Asmodée include:

- 7 Wonders
- 7 Wonders Duel
- Bloodlust
- Carcassonne
- Catan
- Citadels
- Diplomacy
- Dixit
- Dobble
- Formula De
- Hanabi
- Jaipur
- Jungle Speed
- Liar's Dice
- Mission: Red Planet
- Pandemic
- Splendor
- Star Wars: X-Wing Miniatures Game
- Talisman: Digital Edition
- The Werewolves of Millers Hollow
- Ticket to Ride
- Time's Up!

== Subsidiaries ==
- Access+
- Aconyte
- Asmodee Deutschland
- Atomic Mass Games
- Bezzerwizzer Studio
- Blackfire
- Board Game Arena
- Catan Studio
- Days of Wonder
- Dotted Games
- Edge Entertainment
- Exploding Kittens
- Fantasy Flight Games
- Galapagos
- Gamegenic
- Libellud
- Lion Rampant
- Lookout Games
- Mixlore
- Office Dog
- Philibert
- Plan B Games
- Rebel Studio
- Repos Production
- Space Cow
- Space Cowboys
- Tric Trac
- The Green Board Game Co.
- Unexpected Games
- Z-Man Games
- Zygomatic Games

Former Subsidiaries

- Pearl Games
- Twin Sails Interactive
