= Five Tribes (board game) =

Board game

- Designers: Bruno Cathala
- Publishers: Days of Wonder
- Genres: Strategy Game
- Players: 2–4
- Playing time: 60–90 minutes
- Chance: Moderate-high
- Age range: 13+
- Skills: auction, area control

Five Tribes is a board game created by Bruno Cathala in which four players move and manipulate the five tribes in an attempt to gain control of the fictional Sultanate of Naqala. Unlike most worker placement games, Five Tribes begins with the Meeples already on the board. The rules are relatively simple, but the game requires complex strategies to outwit opponents and take control of the most land.

The game is also known as 五大部落 (Chinese), 다섯 부족 (Korean), Five Tribes: Os Gênios de Naqala (Portuguese), ファイブ・トライブズ (Japanese), П'ять Каст (Ukrainian), Пять племён (Russian), Five Tribes: Naqala dzsinnjei (Hungarian), Pięć Klanów: Dżiny Naqali (Polish), Five Tribes: I Geni di Naqala (Italian).

== Gameplay ==
Players will take a set of Camels and turn markers of a color. Each player also takes 50 gold coins, the number of coins a player has is not open knowledge. 30 tiles are randomly placed into a 5x6 grid. Each tile then gets 3 random meeples placed upon it. Players bid for turn order. The player who wins the highest position goes first and will take their full turn before the next player. Each turn, a player selects a tile that has meeples on it, and will take all the meeples on that tile then place them, one at a time, on an adjacent tile that has at least one other meeple on it, is not diagonal, and that has not had a meeple placed on it this turn. The player will take all the meeples of the same color

Play continues until a player places their last camel, or there are no legal moves left. Scores are then tallied with gold coins and yellow and white meeples being worth points, and additional points available for palm trees, players with fewer meeples than you, Djinns, palaces, and controlled tiles. Merchandise is also sold off and that gold is added to the final points. The player with the most points wins.

== Expansions ==
There are three expansions to Five Tribes. The first, The Artisans of Naqala, adds a sixth tribe, artists which allowed players to create items that give the player points or powers. To use this new tribe, a player had to visit new tiles which were added to the game. Another addition in this expansion was the impassable Chasm and mountain markers. The mini-expansion, Thieves of Naqala, added an element that let players force their opponents to discard or get rid of items whenever a tribe is activated. The third expansion, Whims of the Sultan, added the capacity to add a 5th player and also added new cities with special tasks.

== Awards ==
Year	Award	Category	Status	Ref
2015	SXSW Gaming Awards	Tabletop Game of the Year	Nominated	
2015	Les Trois Lys	Lys Passioné	Won	
2015	International Gamers Award	General Strategy Multi-player	Nominated	
2015	As d'Or	Jeu de l’année Grand Prix	Won	
2014	Tric Trac		Won	
2014	Meeples' Choice		Nominated	
2014	Golden Geek Award	Most Innovative Board Game	Nominated	
2014	Golden Geek Award	Board Game of the Year	Nominated	
2014	Golden Geek Award	Best Strategy Board Game	Won	
2014	Golden Geek Award	Best Board Game Artwork & Presentation	Nominated	
2014	Board Game Quest	Game of the Year	Won	
2014	Board Game Quest	Best Strategy/Euro Game	Nominated	
