= Bruno Faidutti =

French board game designer (born 1961)

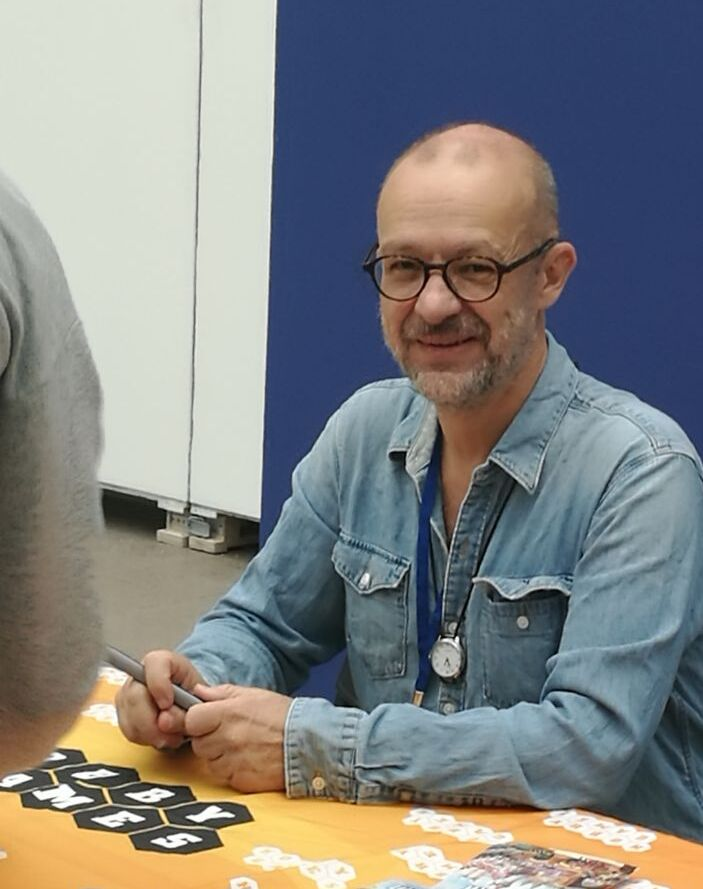
Bruno Faidutti on Igrokon-2018 exhibition

Bruno Faidutti (born 23 October 1961) is a historian and sociologist, living in France, who is best known as a board game designer.

== Early life and education ==
Bruno Faidutti studied law, economics, and sociology, eventually earning a doctorate in history by writing about the scientific debate in the Renaissance on the reality of the unicorn. His favorite authors are Thomas Pynchon, James Joyce, Marcel Proust, Salman Rushdie, and Umberto Eco, his favorite movie, Andrei Tarkovsky's Andrei Roublev. He came into the world of hobby gaming through Cosmic Encounter and roleplaying games, and was one of the first French Dungeons & Dragons players.

== Career ==
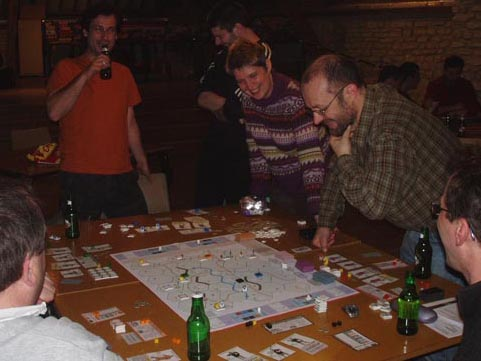
Bruno Faidutti playtesting his game Warrior Knights in 2005

Bruno Faidutti has created and published over 40 board and card games. His best known games include Knightmare Chess (1991) and Citadels (2000), as well as Mystery of the Abbey (1993, 2003). He is also involved in the boardgaming community with his "Ideal Games Library" website and personal "Game of the Year" prize. Many of his games are the results of collaboration with other designers.

In the United States, his Eurogame Corruption was released by Atlas Games in 1999. His Citadels was released in 2000 by Fantasy Flight Games, who later released his game Red November in 2008.

== Selected list of games ==
- Knightmare Chess, 1991 (with Pierre Cléquin)
- Citadels, 2000
- Castle, 2000 (with Serge Laget)
- Dragon's Gold, 2001
- China Moon, 2003
- Mystery of the Abbey, 2003 (with Serge Laget)
- Queen's Necklace, 2003 (with Bruno Cathala)
- Key Largo, 2005 (with Paul Randles and Mike Selinker)
- Mission: Red Planet, 2005 (with Bruno Cathala)
- Diamant (aka Incan Gold), 2005 (with Alan R. Moon)
- Ad Astra, 2009 (with Serge Laget)
- Mascarade, 2013
- Warehouse 51, 2015
- Raptor, 2015, (with Bruno Cathala)
- Waka Tanka, 2016
- HMS Dolores, 2016, (with Eric M. Lang)
- Tonari, 2019
