= Alan R. Moon =

British board game designer

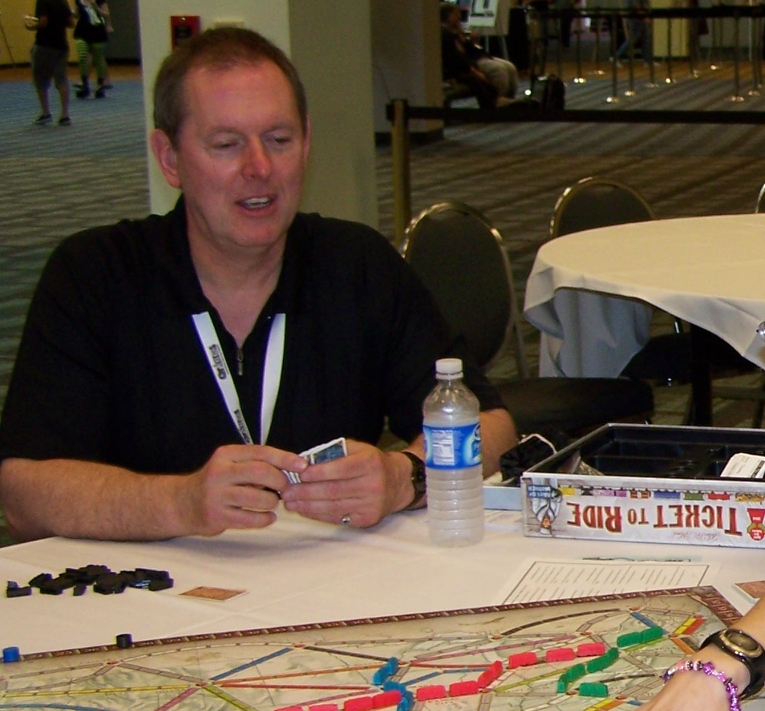
- Moon playing his game Ticket to Ride at Origins Game Fair 2007
- Born: November 18, 1951 (age 74); Southampton, England
- Occupation: Board game designer
- Known for: Ticket to Ride
- Website: alanrmoon.com

Alan R. Moon (born 18 November 1951) is a British game designer best known for creating the turn-based strategy game Ticket to Ride. He is generally considered to be one of the foremost designers of German-style board games. Many of his games can be seen as board game variations on the travelling salesman problem.

== Career ==
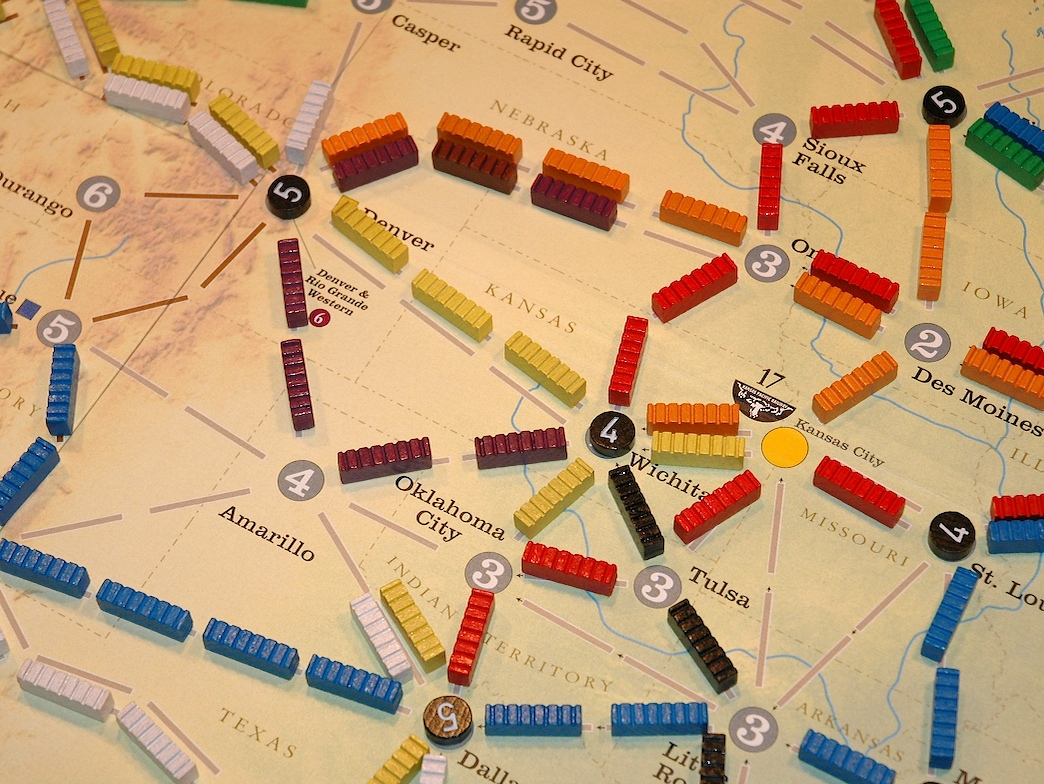
Moon's Santa Fe Rails in play

Moon has worked as a game designer for Avalon Hill, Parker Brothers, and Ravensburger F.X. Schmid USA. His first published game was Black Spy (Avalon Hill, 1981), inspired by the classic card game, Hearts. But his first game that got him attention was Airlines, published by the German company Abacus in 1990. He started his own publishing company, White Wind, in 1990 and ran it until 1997. He now publishes his games through other companies, such as Ravensburger and Days of Wonder.

Since 2000, Moon has been a full-time freelance game designer, with dozens of games to his credit. Moon has won the Spiel des Jahres (Game of the Year) award twice, for Elfenland in 1998 and for Ticket to Ride in 2004. Ticket to Ride has won almost two dozen other awards worldwide.

== Selected list of games ==
a full list is available from Moon's website in the external links section.

- Capitol with Aaron Weissblum (2001, Spiel des Jahres nominated, Deutscher Spiele Preis 5th place)
- Das Amulett with Aaron Weissblum (2001, Spiel des Jahres nominated, Deutscher Spiele Preis 10th place)
- Diamant with Bruno Faidutti (2005)
- Down with the King with Glenn and Kenneth Rahman (1981)
- Elfenland (1998, Spiel des Jahres winner, Deutscher Spiele Preis 3rd place)
- Get the Goods with Mick Ado (1990, Spiel des Jahres nominated, Deutscher Spiele Preis 4th)
- San Marco (2001, Spiel des Jahres nominated, Deutscher Spiele Preis 7th place)
- Ticket to Ride (2004, Spiel des Jahres winner)
- Union Pacific (1999, Spiel des Jahres nominated, Deutscher Spiele Preis 3rd place)

== See also ==
- Going Cardboard (Documentary)
