= Wellycon =

Board game convention in New Zealand

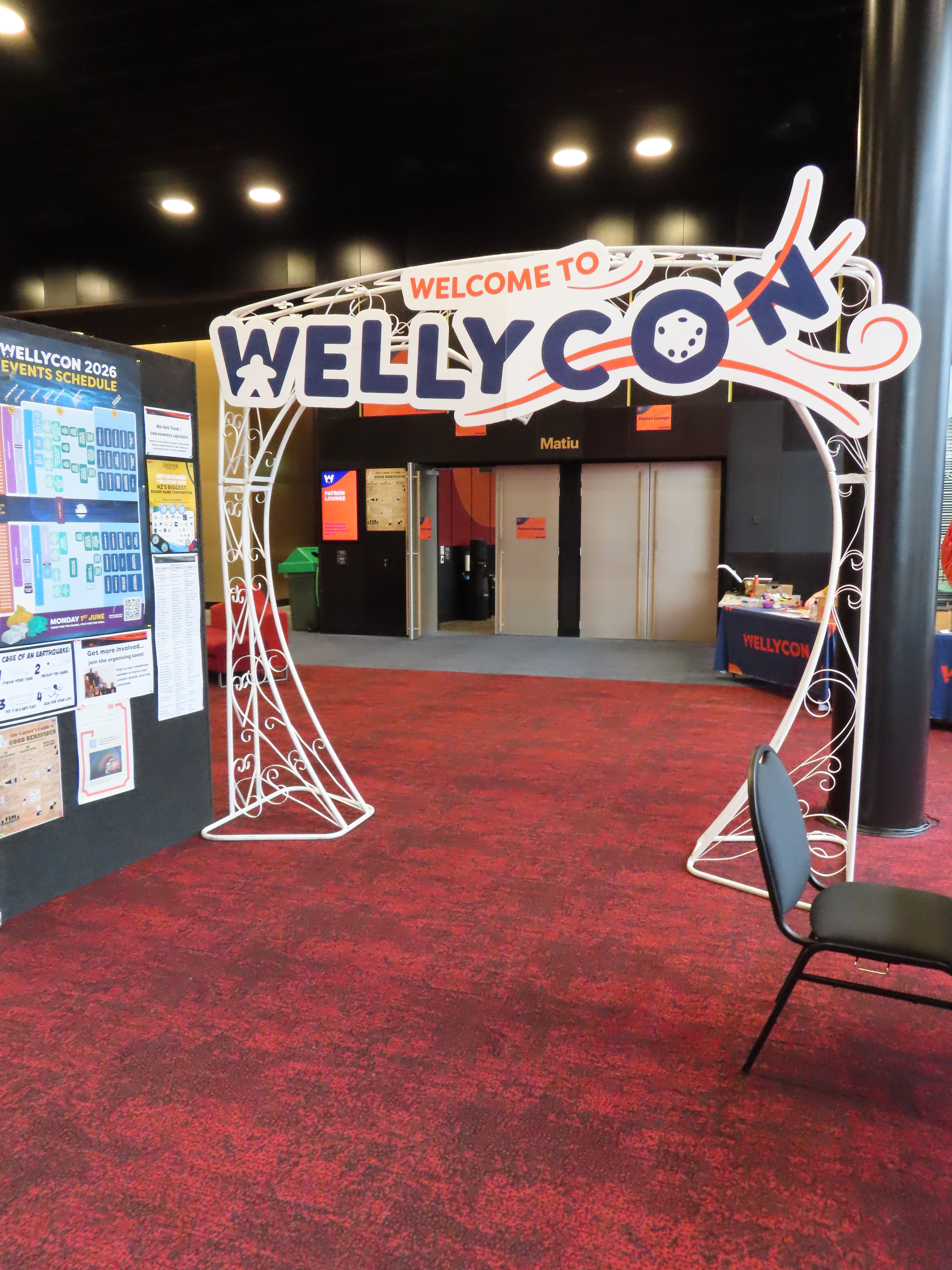
Welcome arch at Wellycon 2026 at Tākina convention centre in Wellington, New Zealand.

Wellycon is the largest board game convention in New Zealand.

The Wellycon Convention is held annually in Wellington, New Zealand on the Saturday and Sunday of King's Birthday Weekend. The first Wellycon was held in 2008, with numbers steadily increasing, e.g. 2018 at Wellington Girls' College, with over 600 attendees. The focus of the con is on having space and time to play games onsite, in contrast to many sci-fi/fantasy or board game trade fairs such as Spiel (the largest board game convention in the world). The totally volunteer-run committee works hard to fulfil the tag-line "the biggest, fun, friendly board game convention in NZ" with over 150 volunteers facilitating at the event.

== Special events ==
2025 saw the ever-expanding Wellycon – they added a third, half-day. Due to the venue being double booked, Wellycon was held on Matariki Weekend, which meant the holiday was Friday not Monday. So Wellycon was Fri/Sat/and Sunday until 3pm. This experiment proved popular but it is undecided if it will continue as it is a lot of extra work for the volunteer committee.

In 2024 Wellycon added the 'Patron' tier of support. In return for an annual fee, Patrons got early access to the venue, patron-specific gifts and a Patron lounge to use during the event. They also added more tournaments, 'mix & mingle' section and a permanently set-up dexterity games area.

The 2023 Wellycon added the 'Orbit Sessions' – boardgame-related panel discussions, Kiwi game designers success stories, quizzes and so on. They also partnered with Lego Masters NZ Series 2 contestants, Amy & Llewe, to provide the Great Wellycon Sheep Trek, to fit in with the Great Western Trail:NZ sheep-based theme.

The 2022 Wellycon had the first 'prototype event' where game designers play-tested their prototypes with many attendees and a prize draw was held for those who had given feedback.

The 2021 Wellycon had the first National Catan Tournament. The winner qualified as the New Zealand representative for the Catan World Championships in Malta, Nov 2022.

The 2019 Wellycon featured four international game premieres for the southern hemisphere (at the same time as UK Games Expo release for the northern hemisphere).

The 2018 Wellycon offered an exclusive promo card for the Spiel des Jahres-nominated boardgame Raiders of the North Sea.

== History ==
The event was founded by Andrew Rea, Ian Anderson, Ceedee Doyle and Peter Freer, 4 keen enthusiasts. For more on the history see https://www.wellycon.org.nz/history/.

== Theme Game, Location & Attendance figures ==
Year	Theme Game	Venue	Attendees (approx.)
2026	Endeavor: Deep Sea	Tākina, Wellington convention and exhibition centre	
2025	Pandemic: Fate of the Fellowship	Tākina, Wellington convention and exhibition centre	2,767
2024	Catan: New Energies	Tākina, Wellington convention and exhibition centre	2,600
2023	Great Western Trail: NZ	Tākina, Wellington convention and exhibition centre	2,200
2022	Everdell	Wellington Indian Association, Kilbirnie.	1,082 (Covid Spike)
2021	Wingspan Oceania	Wellington Indian Association, Kilbirnie	1,276
2020	Orleans	Wellington Bridge Club, Tinakori Road, Thorndon	661 (Covid restricted, smaller venue, 4 sessions, max 200 onsite at a time)
2019	Codenames	Wellington Indian Association, Kilbirnie	990
2018	Raiders of the West Kingdoms	Wellington Girls' College, Thorndon	748
2017	Pirates (generic)	Wellington Girls' College, Thorndon	497
2016	Romans (generic)	Wellington High School, Taranaki Street	383
2015	Ticket to Ride	Wellington Bridge Club, Tinakori Road, Thorndon	378
2014	7 Wonders	Wellington Bridge Club, Tinakori Road, Thorndon	357
2013	Lord of the Rings	Wellington Bridge Club, Tinakori Road, Thorndon	234
2012	Ra	Massey Student Union, Wallace Street, Mount Cook, Wellington 6021	222
2011	Carcassonne	Massey Student Union, Wallace Street, Mount Cook, Wellington 6021	–
2010	nil	Wellington College, 15 Dufferin Street, Mount Victoria, Wellington 6021	–
2009	nil	Thistle Hall, Te Aro	–
2008	nil	Thistle Hall, Te Aro	–

== Theme dice (collectable) ==
=== 2026 ===
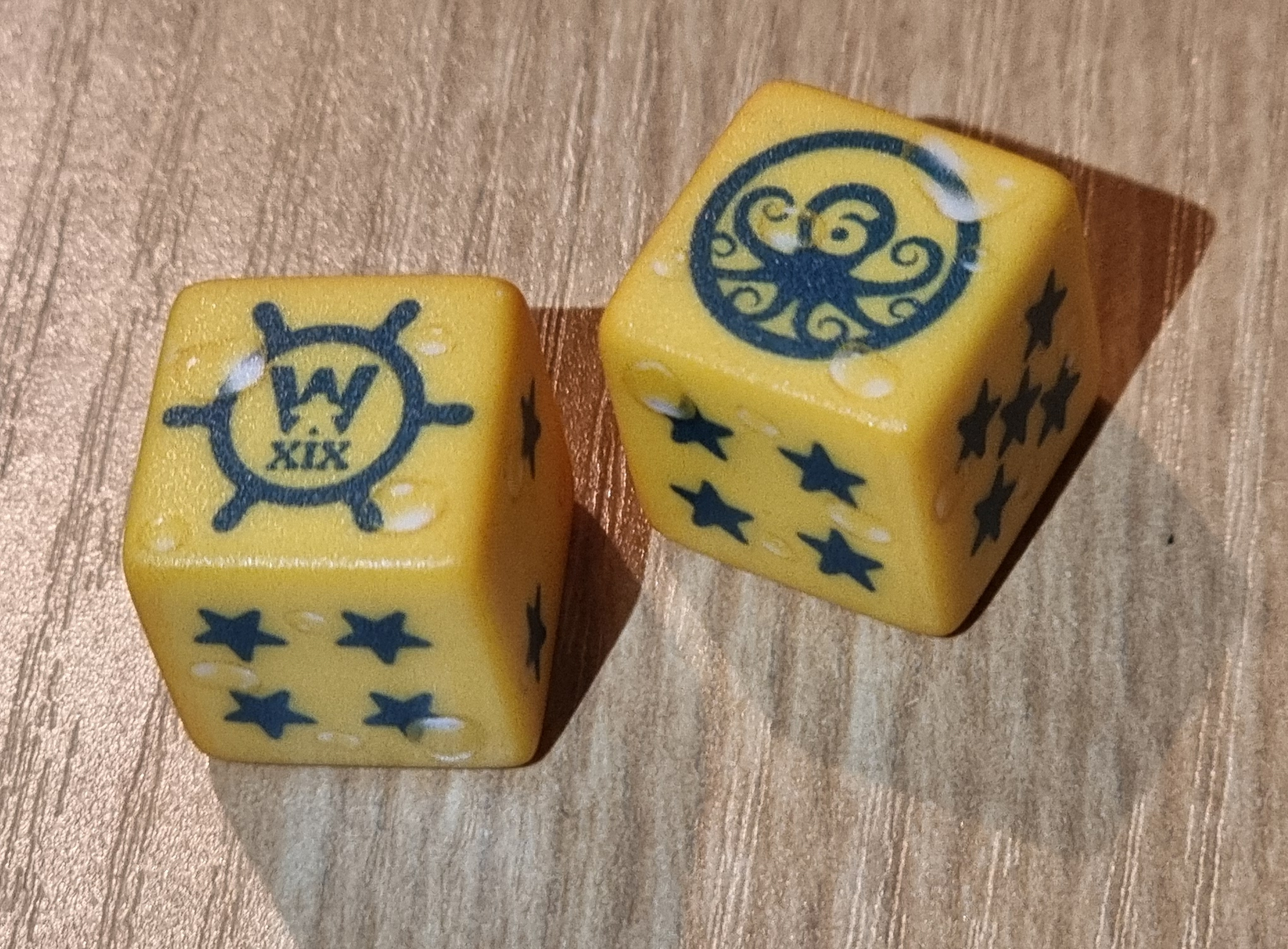
2026 dice based on Endeavor: Deep Sea.

Dice — Yellow background with blue stars as the pips; octopus replacing the 6 side; ship's wheel replacing the 1 side. Endeavor: Deep Sea was the theme game of the year and these dice. Attendees were also given a Wellycon 2026 limited edition Endeavor: Deep Sea journal card.

=== 2025 ===
Spielmateriel dice – Matt black with white pips; design replacing the 6 side. Colours & design by permission of the Tolkien estate.

=== 2024 ===
Paper dice – printed on business card sized cards. Following the sustainable theme. Designed by Bloody Brilliant Designers, Martinborough.

=== 2023 ===
Chessex Dice – Lustrous green with white pips; design replacing the 1 side. Colours based on the grass in the theme game (GWT: NZ) box. Designed by Rhiannon McKinstry.

=== 2022 ===
Chessex Dice – Vortex Bright Green with black pips; design replacing the 1 side. Colours chosen based on theme game everdell box cover. Designed by Rob Digby.

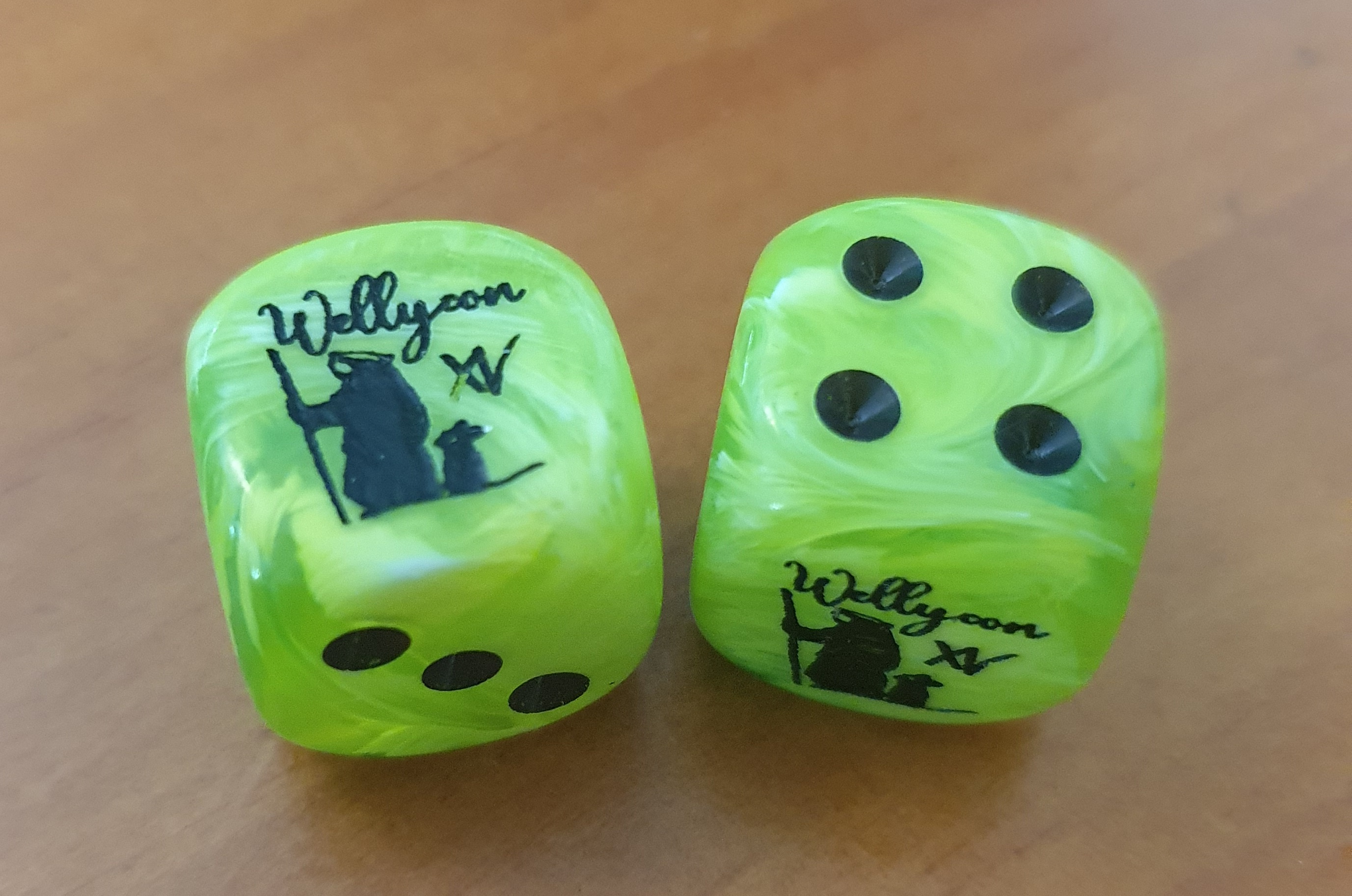
2022 Wellycon dice

=== 2021 ===
Chessex Dice – Translucent Orange with white pips with design replacing the 1 side. Colours chosen based on expansion box colours – Wingspan Oceania. Designed by Rob Digby.

=== 2020 ===
Chessex Dice – Colours based on theme game box – Orleans. Designed by Rob Digby.

=== 2019 ===
Chessex Dice – three sets created to go with codenames theme. 400 Red, 400 Blue, 200 neutral (to match with proportions in Codenames)

Marble Ivory with blackpips with design replacing the 1 side.

Scarab Scarlet with gold pips with design replacing the 1 side.

Scarab Royal Blue with gold pips with design replacing the 1 side.

Colours based on theme game – Codenames. Artwork authorised by CGE games. Designed by Rob Digby.

=== 2018 ===
Chessex Dice – Nebula Dark Blue with white pips with design replacing the 1 side. Colours based on theme game – Raiders of the North Sea (spiel des Jahres nominee from local Kapiti resident, Shem Phillips) – to look like the ship is on the sea. Designed by Rob Digby.

=== 2017 – 10th anniversary dice – D10 & D6 ===
Chessex Dice – Gemini green-purple with gold pips with design replacing the 1 side. Colours based on theme – pirates. Designed by Rob Digby.

A full set of all the dice created to date were reprinted in limited numbers and sold as sets, with the anniversary D10 making up the 10th in the set. They came in a dice bag with hand printed (by the committee!) Wellycon W on the front. NOTE: All the 10th anniversary reprints were done on the 6 side, so some dice in this set are different from their original printing.

=== 2016 ===
Chessex Dice – Gemini Copper-Steel with white pips with Roman laurel wreath design replacing the 1 side. Colours based on theme – Romans (first time just generic theme). Designed by Rob Digby.

=== 2015 ===
Chessex Dice – Gemini black-red with Gold pips with logo in style of ticket to ride words replacing the 1 side. Colours based on theme game – Ticket to Ride. Designed by Craig Gulow.

=== 2014 ===
Chessex Dice – Gemini Blue-purple with Gold pips and “Meeple juggling dice” replacing the 1 side. Colours based on theme game – 7 Wonders. Designed by Craig Gulow.

=== 2013 ===
Chessex Dice – Black die with gold pips and “The One Ring” replacing the 1 pip side. Designed by Peter Freer.

=== 2012 ===
Chessex Dice – Pale blue die with gold pips and a winged scarab replacing the 6 pip side. Designed by Peter Freer.

=== 2011 ===
Chessex Dice – Dark blue die with gold pips and a “Carcassonne” W replacing the 6 pip side. Designed by Peter Freer.

=== 2010 ===
Chessex Dice – Pale blue die with gold pips and a crowned W replacing the 1 pip side. Designed by Peter Freer.

=== 2009 ===
Chessex Dice – Yellow die with black pips, design replaces 1 pip. Actually brighter yellow than shown in these pictures.

=== 2008 ===
There was no die – confirmed by Andrew Rae (Wellycon founder) in 2014.

== Covid impact ==
In 2020, the main convention was postponed to October due to limits on gathering numbers during the COVID-19 pandemic. An online event was held using Zoom and BoardGameArena.

In 2021, although it was held in June as normal, the restriction to 200 in a venue at a time, meant numbers were necessarily limited. The committee aimed to ensure as many people as possible could attend by having 4 half-day sessions instead of one 2-day event.

In 2022, the main convention was postponed to October due to the country being in Red traffic light status at the time the decision had to be made whether to go ahead in June.
