= Mall of Horror =

Mall of Horror is a zombie-themed board game for 3-6 players designed by Nicolas Normandon and published by asmodee in 2005.

== Reception ==
Reviews:

- Rebel Times #14
- Świat Gier Planszowych #2
- The Dice Tower

The game was also a 2006 Golden Geek Best Light / Party Game Nominee.
