= Garphill Games =

New Zealand board game publisher

Garphill Games is a New Zealand-based independent board game publisher founded by Shem Phillips in 2009. Originally started as a passion project, Garphill Games is known for its historically-themed games. The company operates out of the Kāpiti Coast and often uses Kickstarter for initial funding.

== History and founding ==
Garphill Games was founded by Shem Phillips, who initially viewed game design as a hobby. The first game published under Garphill was Linwood in 2009, a simple roll-and-move exploration game. Phillips transitioned to full-time game design in 2017, largely enabled by Kickstarter becoming available in New Zealand. Beginning with Shipwrights of the North Sea in 2014, Garphill Games started using Kickstarter to raise funds for their games, allowing them to transition from producing games locally to distributing them internationally.

Initially Philips independently designed, published, and marketed Garphill's games, but later expanded the team in various departments, including working with Sam Macdonald as a co-designer. Macdonald, based in Lower Hutt, joined Garphill around the West Kingdom series and transitioned to full-time game design by 2020.

The company name, Garphill, is a combination of Phillips' father's name, Gary Phillips and the company logo is a robin after his mother's middle name.

== Publication history ==
Garphill Games has gained recognition for several of its titles, especially the North Sea and West Kingdom trilogies. Raiders of the North Sea was nominated for the Spiel des Jahres Kennerspielaward.

The West Kingdom Trilogy, designed in collaboration with Sam Macdonald, has been one of Garphill's most notable projects. The three titles—Architects of the West Kingdom, Paladins of the West Kingdom, and Viscounts of the West Kingdom—received significant support through Kickstarter campaigns, with Viscounts raising over $1.3 million NZD from nearly 8,000 backers in 2020. The trilogy has been published in multiple languages, expanding its international reach.

In 2022, the company began work on the South Tigris series. The first two titles, Wayfarers of the South Tigris and Scholars of the South Tigris, involve exploration, dice placement, and translation of ancient scrolls, respectively, drawing inspiration from the Abbasid Caliphate and the House of Wisdom.

== Community and market impact ==
Garphill Games is a significant player in the independent tabletop scene in New Zealand and internationally. The company's success has encouraged other local designers to pursue board game creation, and Phillips is an advocate for growing New Zealand's tabletop community. He actively participates in local game design meetups and supports initiatives to help new designers enter the market.

Despite its growth, Garphill remains a small operation. Phillips has expressed that while expansion is possible, he values being directly involved in every part of the process—from design to production—and prefers this level of control over becoming a large-scale publisher. As of 2023, Phillips noted the growing competition in New Zealand but highlighted opportunities for new entrants, particularly in areas like game distribution and crowdfunding support.

== Awards and recognition ==
Garphill Games has received recognition for its innovative game designs. Notably:

- Spiel des Jahres Kennerspiel nomination for Raiders of the North Sea.
- Legacy of Yu won the best solo game of 2023 award from The Dice Tower, BoardGameGeek (Golden Geek Award) and Origins Game Fair.
- Three of its games have consistently ranked among the top 100 board games globally, according to popular board game ranking platforms like BoardGameGeek.

== Selected games ==
- Raiders of the North Sea (2015) – Kennerspiel des Jahres nominee.
- Architects of the West Kingdom (2018)
- Paladins of the West Kingdom (2019)
- Viscounts of the West Kingdom (2020)
- Wayfarers of the South Tigris (2022)
- Scholars of the South Tigris (2023)
- Legacy of Yu (2023)
