= Financial costs of the Seven Years' War =

The Seven Years' War (1756-1763) brought great financial burdens on Great Britain, Kingdom of Prussia, Austria, France, and Sweden. The costs of fighting a protracted war on several continents meant Britain's national debt almost doubled from 1756 to 1763, and this financial pressure which Britain tried to alleviate through new taxation in the Thirteen Colonies helped cause the American Revolution.

== Belligerents ==
=== Great Britain ===
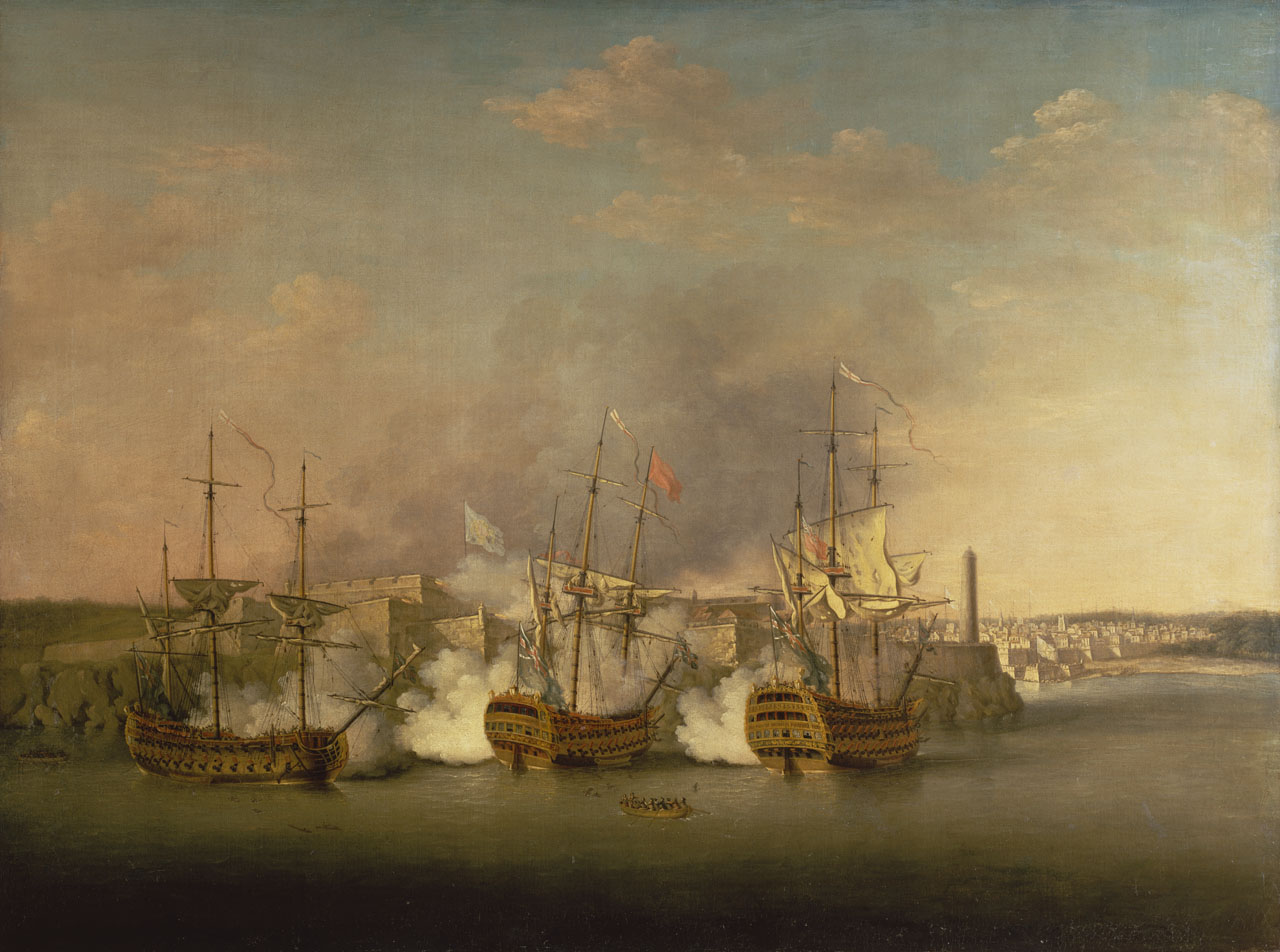
British warships during the siege of Havana. The British government spent around £45 million on the Royal Navy during the conflict.

On the eve of the conflict, British statesmen feared war would increase Britain's national debt to dangerous levels, which by 1756 was £74.6 million. Philip Stanhope wrote a letter to a friend in 1756 warning that "our greatest danger arises from our expense, considering the present immense National Debt." Britain's national debt was already quite large by the start of the war: near the beginning of the 18th century it had around 80% of Gross National Product. Given that Britain had already spent substantial amounts of money on warfare throughout the late 17th and early 18th century, the Seven Years' War would exacerbate Britain's indebtedness (military spending as a percentage of central government spending averaged 74.6% between 1685 and 1813).

Great Britain spent more than £45 million on the navy during the war - around a quarter of its entire war expenditure.

By the end of the war, Britain's national debt stood at £132.6 million. Interests payments on the debt exceeded half of the British Government's budget. By December 1762, British naval debt had increased to £5,929,125 from £3,072,472 in 1749.

==== Thirteen Colonies ====
Commercial activity boomed in the Thirteen Colonies during the early years of the conflict. American merchants sold war supplies to British troops, and bought large stocks of materiel through cheap credit provided by British financiers. Imports into the American Colonies increased substantially. In 1757 there were £168,246 worth of imports; in 1758, £260,953; in 1759, £498,161; and in 1760, £707,998.

Once the British war effort started to focus more on the Caribbean and less on Canada in the 1760s, however, the American colonies' economies started to decline. American merchants had become over-supplied with consumer goods which they had bought with credit from British financiers. When the war effort in Canada eased up, the merchants found they could no longer sell the surplus goods so easily. American merchants found it difficult to repay the loans when the market for war materiel dried up. Additionally, merchants' operating costs rose when shipping insurance firms increased premiums to factor in the risks after Spain entered the war.

In 1766, Benjamin Franklin said in an address to Parliament that American colonists had spent millions of pounds contributing to the war effort.

=== France ===
France gave financial support to its allies. It gave a total of 11 million silver riksdalers (sd.) in subsidies to Sweden during the war.

France lost thousands of livres worth of shipping during the war. Royal Navy ships and British privateers took 1,165 French merchant ships as prizes. Great Britain did not make any substantial fiscal gains taking French ships during the war, however. According to Larry Neal, the taking of prizes "contributed a derisory share to the country's foreign trade" which peaked at 10% of Britain's international trade in 1757. France's shipping losses caused a sharp rise in maritime insurance costs. Before the war maritime insurance for merchant ships crossing the Atlantic Ocean costed roughly 3% of the declared value. During the first year of the war insurance rates costed ten times that and went up to 60% by the end of the war. The conflict prevented France from importing as much raw materials from its colonies as it had prior to 1756, which resulted in increased unemployment as French industry halted due to a lack of raw materials.

British forces captured French enclaves in Senegal and Gambia in 1758 which dealt two blows to the French economy: France lost its gum senega reserves necessary for its silk industry, and it lost a key trading station used for exporting slaves to the Caribbean, which gradually weakened France's sugar production in Guadeloupe and Martinique.

Great Britain annexed nearly all of French Canada during the war, but allowed France to keep its Caribbean colonies. The Duc de Choiseul, who was involved in the post-war negotiations which stripped France of its Canadian colonies, believed that the profits from the sugar trade in France's Caribbean colonies would make up for the loss of Canada, especially given that the fur trade had already collapsed earlier. Guadeloupe, for instance, produced more sugar than all of Britain's Caribbean possessions. See: A few acres of snow.

Nevertheless, the war did disrupt France's trade income. The lucrative sugar and molasses trade between France's Caribbean colonies and Britain's North American colonies fell apart when the war broke out, leading many merchants to turn to smuggling. French colonial trade declined by 81% following the Seven Years' War, according to one estimate. Another estimate puts France's colonial trade losses at 90%.

The following table shows France's average yearly value of overseas trade (in millions of livres) indicating a significant decline in trade during the Seven Years' War, especially from its American colonies.

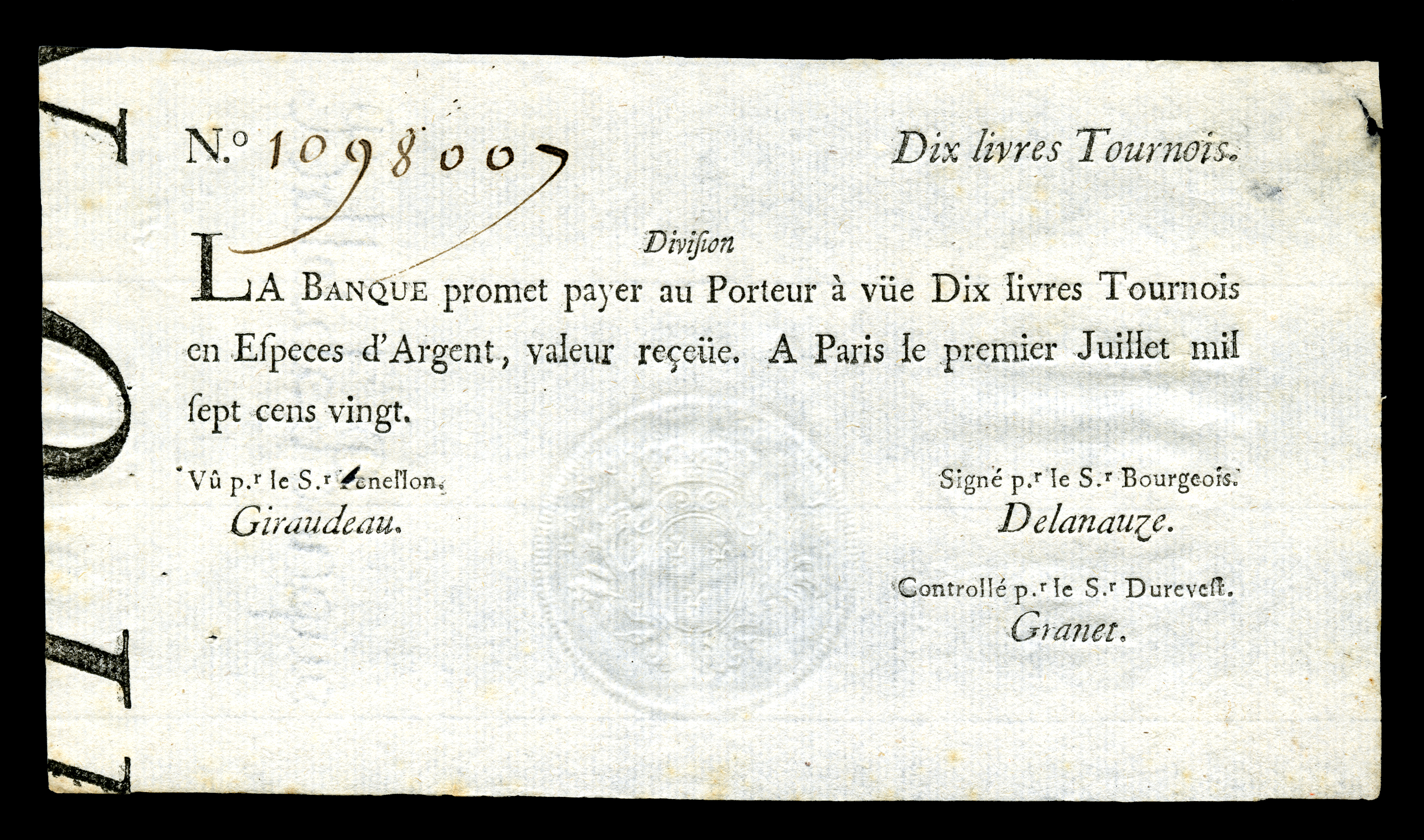
A French livre note from the mid-18th century.

Year	America and W. Africa	India	Europe	Ottoman, Levant, N. Africa	Total Overseas Trade
1740–48	62.1	22.5	288.8	34.4	407.8
1749–55	100.4	37.5	389.8	54.8	582.5
1756–63	27.7 (-72.4%)	9.7 (-74%)	325.5 (-16.5%)	37.3 (-31.9%)	437.6 (-24.9%)
1764-76	147.1	30.2	448.1	59.2	684.6

=== Spain ===
==== Chile ====
Spain's international wars in the second half of the 18th century evidenced the empire's difficulties in reinforcing its colonial possessions and provide them with economic aid. This led to an increased local participation in the financing of the defense and an increased participation in the militias by the Chilean-born. Such development was at odds with the ideals of the centralized absolute monarchy. The Spanish did also formal concessions to strengthen the defense: In Chiloé Spanish authorities promised freedom from the encomienda those indigenous locals who settled near the new stronghold of Ancud (founded in 1768) and contributed to its defense. The increased local organization of the defenses would ultimately undermine metropolitan authority and bolster the independence movement.

=== Sweden ===
Prior to the war Sweden's government ran yearly deficits financed by the National Bank of Sweden, so it had inadequate cash reserves upon the outbreak of hostilities. Sweden continued to take loans from the National Bank during the war and these accounted for 44% of its income. The Swedish East India Company lent 2 million sd. to the government in 1762 and 1763.

Inflation increased during the war. In 1755 there were 13.8 million sd. in circulation and 44 million sd. in circulation by 1763, affecting prices for all goods. A barrel of herring in Uppsala, for instance, cost 12 sd. in 1756 and 27 sd. by 1763.

Sweden also relied on war subsidies from its ally France. France paid subsidies to Sweden eight times between 1757 and 1761. The largest single subsidy was that of 1759 when France paid 3,797,699 sd. In total, France paid over 11 million sd. during these years.

Sweden's government established a nation-wide public lottery to raise funds in 1758 and 1759 which raised 5,800,000 sd. The winnings from the lottery were paid as government bonds rather than cash.
