= Splendor (game) =

2014 card-based board game

- Splendor box cover art
- Designers: Marc André
- Publishers: Space Cowboys
- Players: 2 to 4
- Playing time: 30 minutes
- Skills: Resource management

Splendor is a multiplayer card-based board game, designed by Marc André and illustrated by Pascal Quidault. It was published in 2014 by Space Cowboys (Asmodee). Players are gem merchants of the Renaissance, developing gem mines, transportation, and shops to accumulate prestige points. Splendor received positive reviews and received numerous awards, including winner of Golden Geek Best Family Board Game. It was nominated for the Spiel des Jahres Game of the Year in 2014. The game also received a mobile application and an expansion released in 2017.

== Gameplay ==
Splendor is an engine-building and resource management game in which two to four players compete to collect the most prestige points. The game has the following components:

- 40 gem tokens - seven each of emerald, sapphire, ruby, diamond, onyx, and five gold (wild). These are represented by poker-style chips.
- 90 development cards
- 10 noble tiles

Each development card falls into one of three levels (•, ••, •••) indicating the difficulty to purchase that card.

Every development card also contains a gem bonus (emerald, sapphire, ruby, diamond, or onyx), which may be used for future development card purchases.

Before the game begins, n+1 Noble tiles are dealt face up in the center, where n is the number of players. Four cards from each level (•, ••, •••) are dealt face up, visible to the players, and the rest are kept in separate decks of their corresponding difficulty levels.

=== Turns ===
A player's turn consists of a single action, which must be one of the following:

- Take up to three gem tokens of different colors from the pool.
- Take two gem tokens of the same color from the pool (provided, before the turn, there are at least four tokens left of that color).
- Take one gold gem token and reserve one development card (if, before the turn, number of reserved cards held by that player is less than three)
- Purchase a development card (from the table or the player's reserved cards) by spending the required gem tokens and/or using the gem bonus of the cards purchased previously by the player. Spent gems return to the pool.

After this action:

- If the player has earned enough development card gem bonuses to obtain Noble prestige points, that player is "visited" by the Noble, and takes that Noble tile.
  - A player can only be visited by one noble in each turn; the player chooses between the eligible nobles.
  - Player keeps the Noble until the end of the game.
  - Noble tiles are not replenished.
- If player possesses more than 10 gems, player returns enough gems to limit total count of gems in player's possession to 10 or fewer.
- If a development card is purchased, the empty slot is replenished from the respective deck. If the deck of that rank has run out, the slot stays empty.

=== End of game ===
When one player reaches 15 prestige points, the players continue playing the current round until each player has taken the same number of turns. Once this occurs, the game ends.

=== Scoring ===
Once the game ends, whoever has the most prestige points wins; in case of a tie, whoever purchased the fewest development cards wins. If this fails to break the tie, the player with fewest reserved cards wins. If all else fails, the players will then share the victory.

== Reception ==
The game received positive reviews, with the Wirecutter stating that the game has a "balance of luck and intro-level strategy". Similarly, the Gaming Review praised its accessibility combined with reasonable strategy and the component quality, but criticised its theme, stating that "it's a shame the theme doesn't carry through better". Board Game Halv also gave a positive review, commending on the game's replayability, interaction and components.

== Spin-offs ==
An expansion of the game, Cities of Splendor, was released in 2017, including four modules (The Cities, The Trading Posts, The Orient, The Strongholds). The Opinionated Gamers gave a positive review, describing the changes as subtle and varied.

An online application version of the game for iOS, Android and Steam was published by Asmodee Digital.

In 2020, Splendor: Marvel was released, a re-themed version of the game based on characters from Marvel Comics, notably revolving around the Infinity Gauntlet storyline where Thanos attempts to collect the Infinity Gems.

Released in 2022, Splendor Duel is a two-player only standalone game based on Splendor that retains some of the main gameplay mechanisms of that design.

== Awards ==
- 2014 Dice Tower Gaming Awards Best Family Game, Winner
- 2014 Golden Geek Best Board Game Artwork & Presentation, Nominee
- 2014 Golden Geek Best Family Board Game, Winner
- 2014 Golden Geek Board Game of the Year, Winner
- 2014 Spiel des Jahres Game of the Year, Nominee
- 2014 Tric Trac de Bronze
- 2014 Origins Game of the Year
- 2015 Golden Geek Best Board Game App
