= Legacy of Yu =

2023 single-player board game

- Designers: Shem Phillips
- Illustrators: Sam Phillips
- Writers: Benedict Hewetson
- Publishers: Garphill Games; Renegade Game Studios
- Publication: 2023; 3 years ago
- Genres: City-building game
- Players: 1
- Playing time: 60 minutes
- Age range: 12+

Legacy of Yu is a single-player city-building board game designed by Shem Phillips and published in 2023 by Garphill Games. The player plays as the legendary ancient Chinese king Yu the Great, attempting to build a network of canals to protect against the impending flood, defend villages from attacks by barbarian tribes, and grow villages by feeding people and building infrastructure. The game is played over multiple sessions of a single campaign, with each affected by the outcome of the one before.

== Publication history ==
Legacy of Yu was designed by Shem Philips of Garphill Games and was funded by a successful Kickstarter campaign that launched in September 2022. The game was released in 2023, with some editions published as a collaboration between Garphill Games and Renegade Game Studios.

== Gameplay ==
Legacy of Yu is setup with a game board, a townsfolk ready deck, a townsfolk draw deck, barbarian draw deck, a victory deck, a defeat deck, as well as a townsfolk exhaust area and a discard area. On the game board are seven canal cards that describe materials needed to build that section. Above these cards are spaces for seven villager cards; to start, there are six townsfolk cards and one barbarian card, but this changes over the course of the game. As an action, townsfolk cards can be recruited from this area by paying a material cost–causing them to be placed in the townsfolk exhaust area–or discarded–causing them to be permanently removed from the game–to gain different types of resources. Exhausted cards will enter the townsfolk ready deck to be played after it has been reshuffled, but reshuffling the deck causes the flood marker to move to the next canal card.

On a turn, the player harvests materials based on the buildings that are constructed, then can take an action. Cards played from the townsfolk card deck can be used to gain resources or add additional materials to future harvests. Materials can be spent to recruit townsfolk, build the canal, construct buildings if there are locations by the canal available, trade for different materials, or attack barbarian cards from the space above the board. If the material cost is paid to build a canal, then the canal card is removed, revealing additional building locations and potential trades. Some of the canal cards call for different narrative passages from the Story Book to be read that can add new challenges to the game and others for townsfolk cards from the townsfolk deck to be discarded.

If a barbarian card is in the space above the board after taking an action then the player is attacked, causing them to lose materials or cards from the townsfolk deck. After this, the card row above the board is refreshed by adding townsfolk or barbarian cards from their respective draw decks depending on how many barbarians are required to be added by the revealed canal spaces.

A session is lost if the flood marker ever moves onto an unbuilt canal card, if all the townsfolk cards at the top of the board are replaced by barbarian cards, or if the player needs to draw a townsfolk card but there are none left in the deck. The game is won if all canals are built. Depending on the session's outcome, a card is drawn from either the victory deck or the defeat deck that specifies something that will happen in the subsequent session. The game continues over multiple sessions until the last card of either the Victory deck or the Defeat deck is drawn and the player wins or loses the game.

== Reception ==
Wirecutter called Legacy of Yu the Best Solo Board Game of 2026 along with Final Girl, with James Austin writing that the game has "dynamic story components introduce new complications, keeping the game interesting through multiple playthroughs." IGN included the game in their list of the best solo board games of 2026, and concluded that "despite the odd mixture [of mechanics] it works brilliantly, offering you lots of strategic challenge, historical flavour and moral dilemmas along the way."

Charlie Theel, writing for Polygon, described Legacy of Yu as "eliminate[ing] the barriers of length and commitment" and praised the game's non-linear play and quick setup. He expanded upon his review in an article for Player Elimination, noting that most of the game mechanically and narratively can be seen in a single playthrough of the campaign, which limits its replayability but allows players to take their time with playing.

Legacy of Yu was the winner of the 2023 Best Solo Board Game Origins Award.
