= Final Girl (disambiguation) =

Final girl is a trope in horror films.

Final girl or Final Girl may also refer to:

- Final Girl (film), a 2015 American action horror thriller
- Final Girl (album), 2026 studio album by Dove Cameron
- The Final Girls, a 2015 American comedy slasher film
- "The Final Girl(s)", the thirteenth and final episode of the first season of Scream Queens (2015 TV series)
- "Final Girl" (Constantine), an unaired episode of Constantine
- "Final Girl" (American Horror Story), an episode of the ninth season of American Horror Story
- Final Girls, a 2017 thriller novel
- "Final Girl", a song from the 2014 Electric Youth album Innerworld
- Final Girl, a 2021 one-player board game
- "Final Girl", a song from the 2021 Chvrches album Screen Violence

== See also ==
- The Final Girl Support Group, a 2021 horror novel by Grady Hendrix
