= Endeavor: Deep Sea =

2024 board game

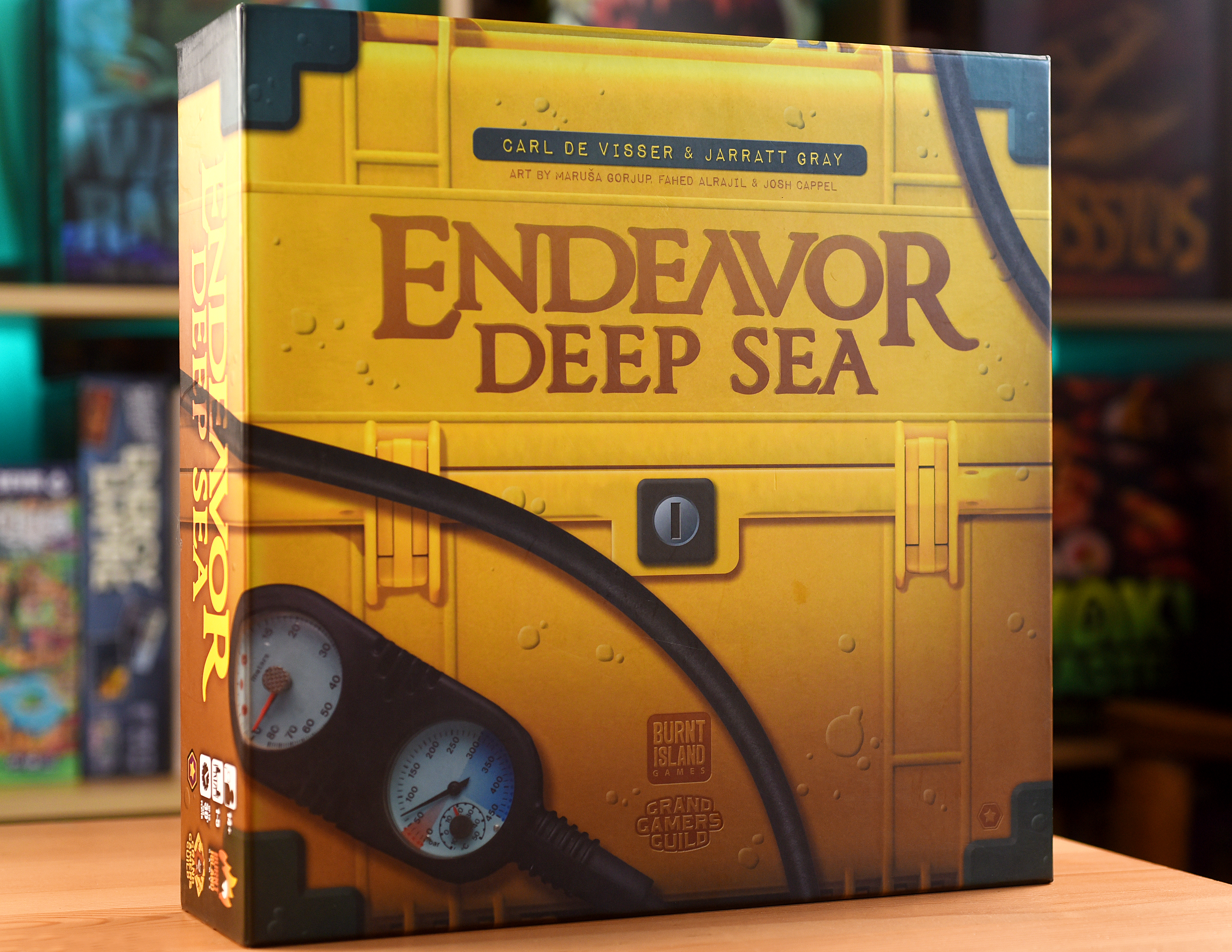
- Board game box of Endeavor: Deep Sea
- Designers: Carl de Visser and Jarratt Gray
- Illustrators: Fahed Alrajil and Maruša Gorjup
- Publishers: Burnt Island Games and Grand Gamers Guild
- Publication: 2024; 2 years ago
- Genres: Board game
- Players: 1–4 (standard)
- Playing time: 60–120 minutes
- Website: https://www.burntislandgames.com/endeavordeepsea

Endeavor: Deep Sea is a strategy board game for one to four players designed by Carl de Visser and Jarratt Gray and published jointly by Burnt Island Games and Grand Gamers Guild in 2024. In the game, players take the role of heading an independent research institute with the goal of developing sustainable projects and preserving the fragile balance of marine life.

Endeavor: Deep Sea is designed by the same team that designed Endeavor (2009) and Endeavor: Age of Sail (2018).

== History ==
After publishing Endeavor in 2009, New Zealanders Carl de Visser and Jarratt Gray had set towards creating another board game built on the foundations of Endeavor. De Visser and Gray designed Endeavor: Deep Sea for one and a half years. A Kickstarter campaign for the game was launched in 2023 by the game's publishers, Burnt Island Games and Grand Gamers Guild. Endeavor: Deep Sea was published in 2024.

In 2026, Endeavor: Deep Sea was the featured game at Wellycon in Wellington, New Zealand.

== Gameplay ==
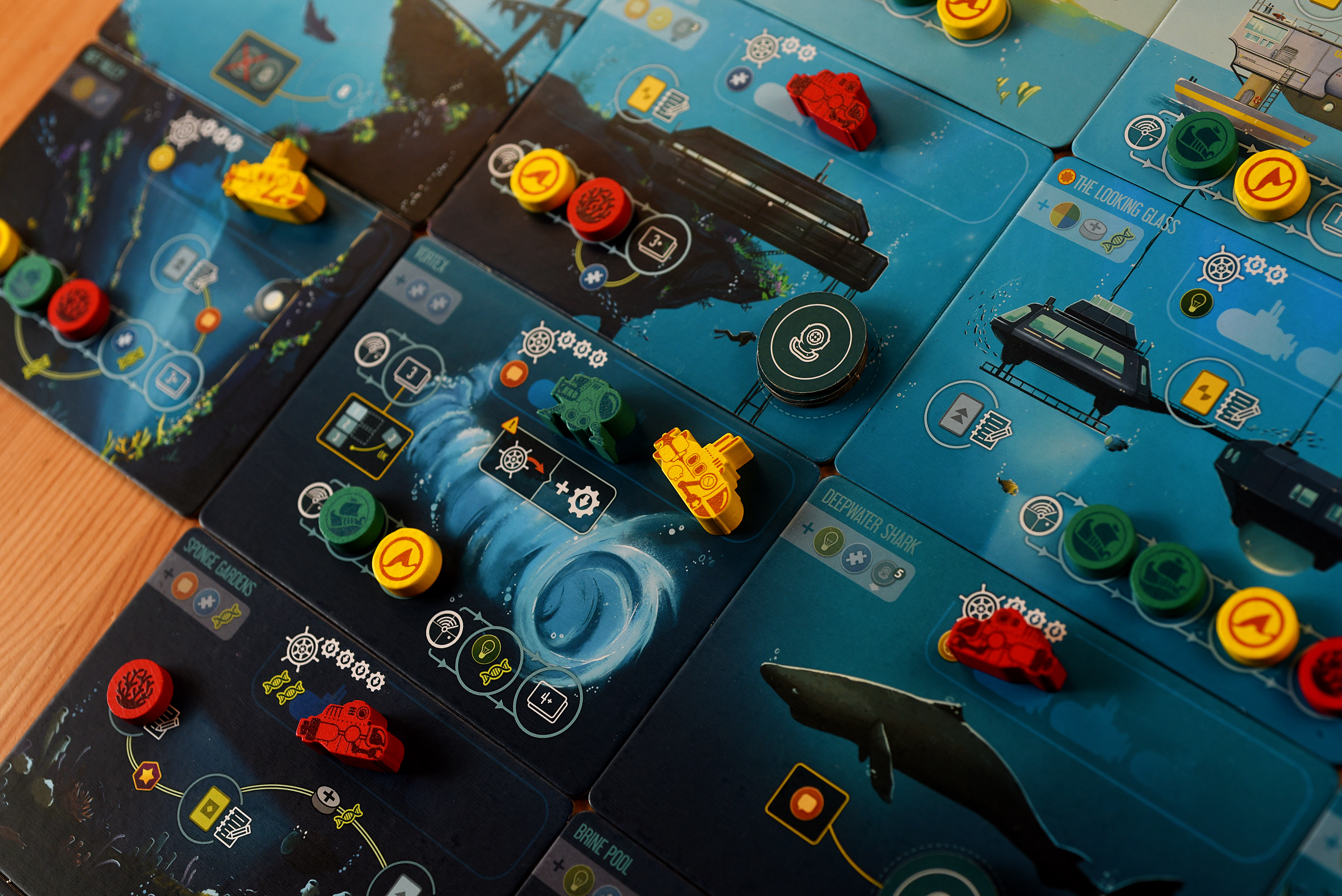
Gameplay of Endeavor: Deep Sea

Players represent an institute of oceanographers doing research and conservation work. Players can compete competitively, cooperatively, or solo. By heading an independent research institute, players have the goal of developing sustainable projects and preserving the balance of marine life. The gameplay includes recruiting a field of experts and using their abilities to explore new locations, researching dive sites, publish ecological papers, and launching conservation efforts.

Across six rounds in the competitive and cooperative modes, players must lead their marine life specialists by making them travel, sonar, dive, conserve or journal in order to score points. In the solo mode, the number of rounds extends to seven.

Endeavor: Deep Sea has 10 different missions for players to elect from in any of the three player modes.

== Reception ==
=== Aggregate reviews ===
As of June 2026, Endeavor: Deep Sea has an average rating of 8.2 out of 10 on BoardGameGeek.

=== Critical reviews ===
Justin Bell of Meeple Mountain rated the game 3.5 out of 5 stars, saying he "struggled to see what others have experienced in their appreciation for the design." He appreciated the map variability, the passive bonuses awarded to opponents who did not take part in certain Journal card actions, the included recruit storage tray, and the game's ease of onboarding new players.

Andrea Champagne of Board Game Quest rated Endeavor: Deep Sea 5 out of 5 stars, noting it was "definitely worthy of being Kennerspiel des Jahres". Champagne praised the game for pulling everything together into something that is "near-perfect whole; the art, the theme, the thematically driven actions." She praised the iconography, theme guides, and how the game can be played in every iteration (competitive, co-operative, and solo) with the same ruleset.

Dan Hinkin of Gaming Trend rated the game 95 out of 100 praising it for its easy to pick up rules which lead to "more strategic gameplay the more you get the game to the table." He praised the replayability with the game having 10 different missions available as well as multiple game modes. He also noted pros as being the beautiful artwork and colours invoking ocean exploration and the ease of learning the game. Hinkin noted two cons as being that the game has "some warpage on player boards after some time" and missing player aides for symbols.

Tuukka Määttänen of Finnish board game news website Lautapeliopas praised Endeavor: Deep Sea for its nice sense of progression, suitable milestones, and rewards. Määttänen praised the marine exploration theme and how it shines through the game's components. Määttänen also appreciated the fact that there is no plastic at all in the game, and how attention has been paid to environmental values.

Matt Thrower of IGN listed Endeavor: Deep Sea as one of the 15 best co-operative games of 2026.

=== Sales ===
Following Endeavor: Deep Sea's win at the Spiel des Jahres in Germany in 2025, the game's sales increased to tens of thousands.

== Awards and nominations ==
Awards and nominations
Year	Game	Award	Category	Result
2025	Endeavor: Deep Sea	Spiel des Jahres	Kennerspiel des Jahres (Connoisseurs' Game of the Year)	Won
2024	Endeavor: Deep Sea	Origins Awards	Best Heavy Strategy	Won
2025	Endeavor: Deep Sea	Gra Roku	Advanced Game of the Year	Nominated
2025	Endeavor: Deep Sea	Deutscher Spiele Preis	Best Family/Adult Game	Nominated
2024	Endeavor: Deep Sea	Golden Geek	Medium Game of the Year	Nominated
2024	Endeavor: Deep Sea	Golden Geek	Best Thematic Board Game	Nominated
2024	Endeavor: Deep Sea	Board Game Quest	Best Strategy/Euro Game	Nominated

== Gallery ==
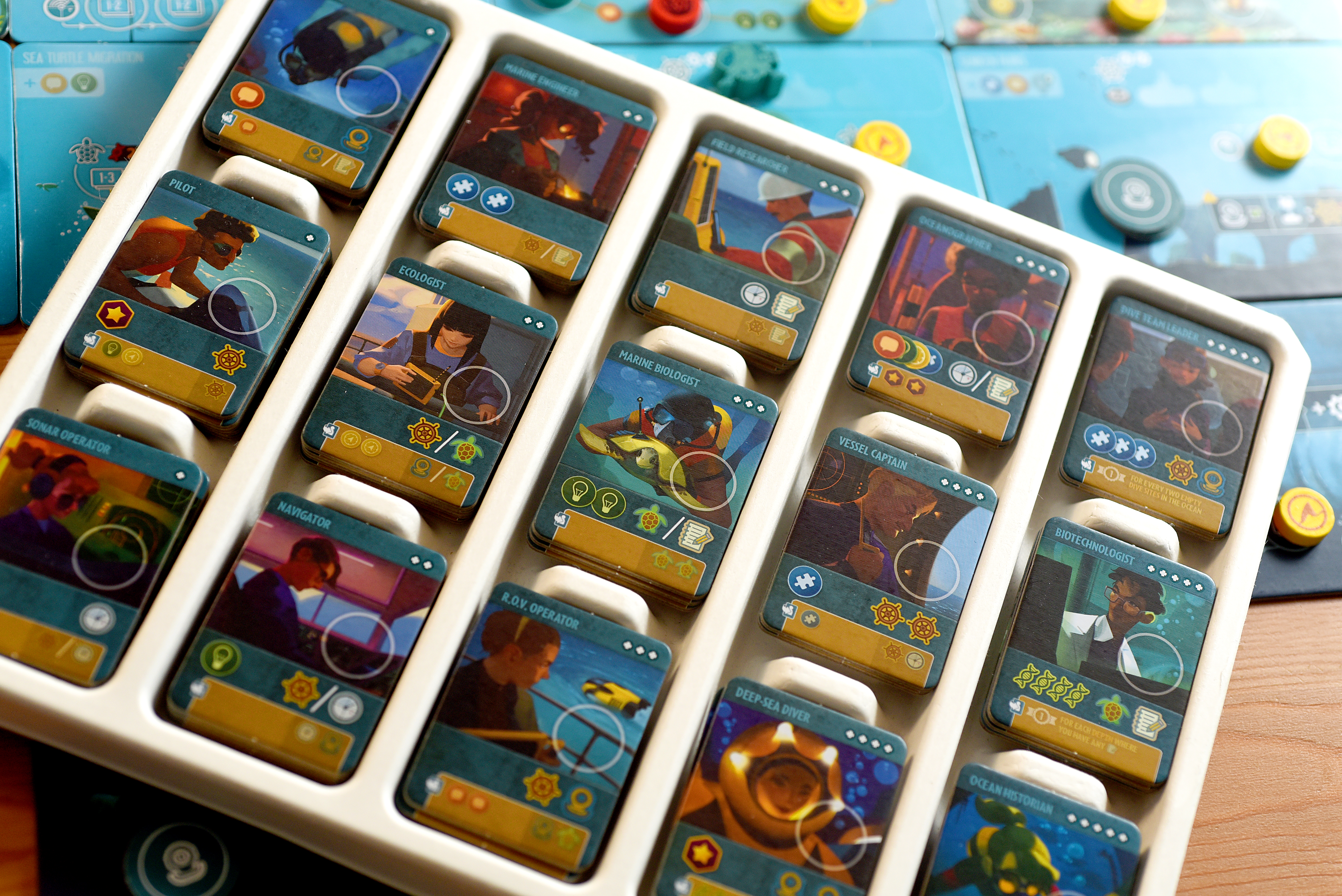
Character cards

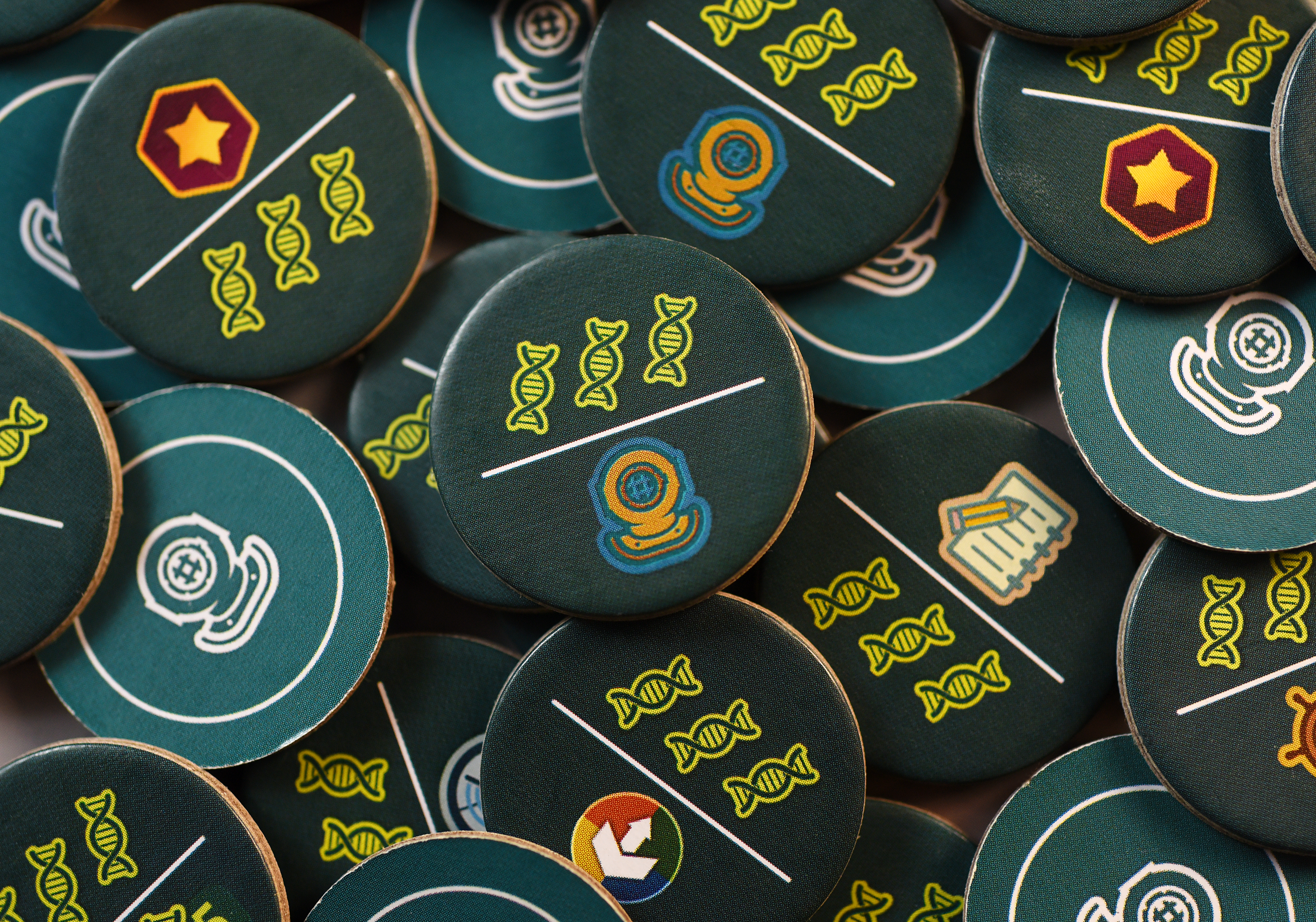
Dive tokens

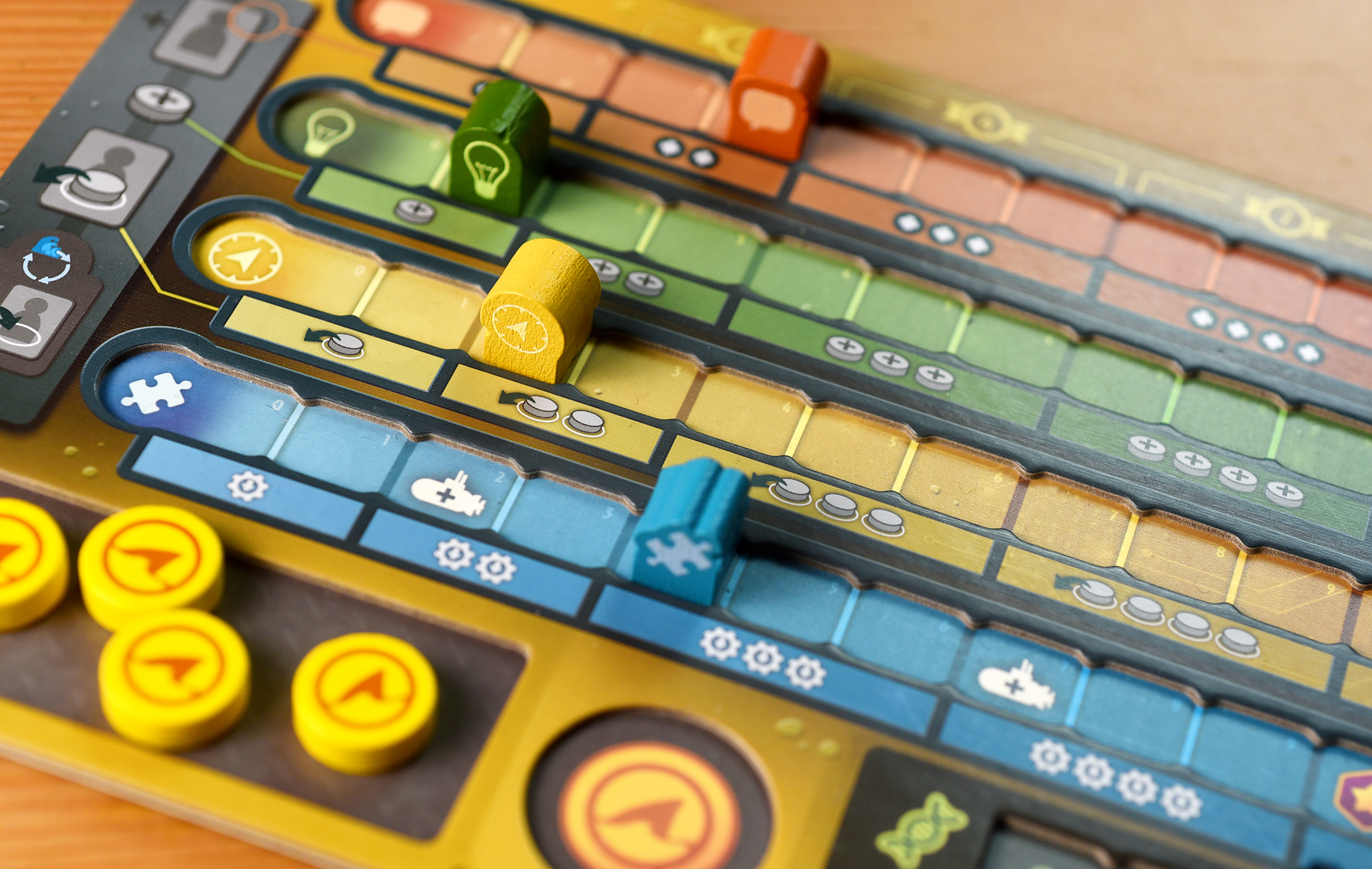
Player board
