= 7 Wonders Duel =

2015 card game

- Designers: Antoine Bauza; Bruno Cathala
- Illustrators: Miguel Coimbra
- Publishers: Repos Production
- Publication: 2015
- Genres: Card; strategy
- Parent games: 7 Wonders
- Players: 2
- Website: www.rprod.com/en/games/7-wonders-duel

7 Wonders Duel is a 2015 two-player strategy card game designed by Antoine Bauza and Bruno Cathala with art from Miguel Coimbra. A spinoff of 7 Wonders, the game was published by Repos Production and achieved commercial success.

== Gameplay ==
7 Wonders Duel is a two-player strategy card game. A game consists of three stages, each with a unique deck of cards, laid out in a overlapping pyramid shape. On a player's round, they must select one of the available cards and perform one of three actions. They may construct it by paying its cost in resources, activating the card and giving the player its effects. These include resource production, military advances, scientific tokens, victory points, and coins. Alternatively, the card may be discarded for coins or used to construct wonders. Similar to in 7 Wonders, which the game is a spinoff of, wonders give large benefits and cost multiple resources to construct.

There are three means of victory. Anytime during the game, a player wins if they have advanced the military token to the end of the track or if they have six different science tokens. If neither condition is met at the end of the game, the player with most victory points, as calculated by a formula, wins. There is a single-player variant available, in which the opponent is replaced by a leader card that takes actions based on decision cards.

== Reception ==
7 Wonders Duel was published by Repos Production, a subsidiary of Asmodee, in 2015. Critical reception was mostly positive. Matt Bassil from Wargamer wrote that it was "one of the absolute best couples board games money can buy", and Birth.Movies.Death.'s Evan Saathoff described it as "an easy setup that'll have your opponent asking to play again and again". The game's replay value has been criticized, with Keith Law at Paste Magazine saying that it "loses some of the former game's need for strategy" and that it "lacks the variation from game to game".

The game was a commercial success, selling one million copies in five years, at twice the speed of 7 Wonders. It was nominated for, and won, BoardGameGeek's "Best 2-Player Board Game" and "Best Card Game" awards of the same year.

7 Wonders Duel was awarded the 2015 Origins Awards for "Best Card Game" and "Fan Favorite Card Game".
