= A Few Acres of Snow (board game) =

2011 board game

A Few Acres of Snow, published in 2011 by Treefrog Games, is a board wargame designed by Martin Wallace. It is based on the French and Indian War of 1754-1763. Its name is taken from "a few acres of snow", words of consolation Voltaire provided King Louis XV, when news arrived that France had lost Canada. The title was also used for a book by Robert Leckie.

== Awards ==
- 2011 winner of the BoardGameGeek Golden Geek Award
- 2011 winner of the Meeples' Choice Award,

== Reimplementation ==
In 2014 Treefrog released Mythotopia, a multiplayer game based on the core mechanisms in A Few Acres of Snow. A third, space themed game, A Handful of Stars, was released – as the last game published by Treefrog Games – in 2017.
