= BoardGameGeek =

Online database of board games

- Owner: Scott Alden
- Founders: Scott Alden and Derk Solko
- Website: boardgamegeek.com
- Launched: January 2000; 26 years ago

BoardGameGeek (BGG) is an online forum for board gaming hobbyists and a user-generated game database that holds reviews, images and videos for over 150,000 different tabletop games. The site allows users to rate games on a 1–10 scale and shows these as a ranked list of board games. It is considered the most-used website by board game enthusiasts since the 2000s, and recent academic literature about board games relies on the website. The New York Times in 2019 called it "the hub of board gaming on the internet."

== History ==
BoardGameGeek was founded in January 2000 by Scott Alden and Derk Solko. Alden had an ambition for the website to be the "worldwide definitive resource for board games." The site's early structure was based on Alden's earlier work from 1996, 3DGameGeek. This was a similar site which hosted discussions on digital games with three-dimensional graphics.

In 2005, BGG began hosting an annual board game convention, BGG.CON, that has a focus on playing games and where winners of the Golden Geek Awards are announced. New games are showcased and convention staff is provided to teach rules. In 2010, BGG received the Diana Jones Award for Excellence in Gaming which recognized it as "a resource without peer for board and card gamers, the recognized authority of this online community." On the BGG forums, posts seeking new players and groups for playing tabletop games roughly tripled from 2005 to 2015, growing at a rate of 10% per year. By 2014, the website's database held cross-referenced entries for over 65,000 games, 9,000 artists, 13,000 publishers and 18,000 designers. By April 2019, it covered 80,000 titles. Over 250,000 users had rated at least one game on the website, with a total of 15 million ratings.

In 2019, the site updated its logo, which originally depicted a white blond man with spectacles running with a checkerboard. Alden wrote that "BGG welcomes all gamers, whatever your level of experience or particular tastes, and updating the logo reflects our belief that gaming is for everyone, not just geeky guys with glasses. Whatever our differences individually, gaming brings us together. Our new symbol is a nod to BGG's past, while also inviting you to see yourself in that silhouette—or to find your passion for play represented in that 'game flame.'"

In 2020, BGG was inducted into the Origins Award Hall of Fame that year. In 2024, the website had information on over 150,000 board games, and was being regularly accessed by 300,000 active users.

== Design ==
BoardGameGeek's central piece is its large database of cross-referenced entries of board games, artists, publishers and designers. To navigate this database, users can browse categories of board games. The website groups games by their 'families', using broad concepts such as 'strategy' instead of directly classifying themes. It also logs the games' mechanisms. Information on the website is the result of user-driven labor. The database can be accessed to conduct quantitative research, with much recent academic literature about board games relying on BGG.

BGG has a live rating system, through which games are rated by users on a scale of 1 to 10. To supplement this, they are also allowed to give a qualitative description of their rating. The lowest rating, 1, is suggested by the website to correspond with the words, "Defies description of a game. You won't catch me dead playing this. Clearly broken", whereas games rated 10 are "Outstanding. Always want to play and expect this will never change". Ratings of 8 and above generally indicate that a game is well-liked, whereas ratings under 7 indicate the opposite. Users of the website generally prefer games which are longer and more complex. The website's user reviews are often placed next to those of more established outlets such as Shut Up & Sit Down and The Dice Tower, rather than being purely curated through online magazine ratings as per the digital game industry.

Users can visit BGG's online forums, which involve reviews, errata, news, play logs, design notes, articles about strategy, and images. Users maintain a personal profile where they may list, rank, and review their board game collections, manage a blog, and advertise projects and local conventions.. the website's international userbase is highlighted through use of flags denoting users' countries of origin that exist next to all user avatars. They can view 'Geeklists' which are lists of games put together by other users; one of these lists a history of the number-one ranked games on BGG. Contributors can buy 'geek gold', which buys cosmetics for users on the website, and BGG also gains funds through an annual end-of-year fundraiser.

Users can also shop for games and accessories, trade and sell games between one another through the site's market or through Amazon and eBay, and take part in user-and company-driven giveaways and contests.

== Golden Geek Award ==
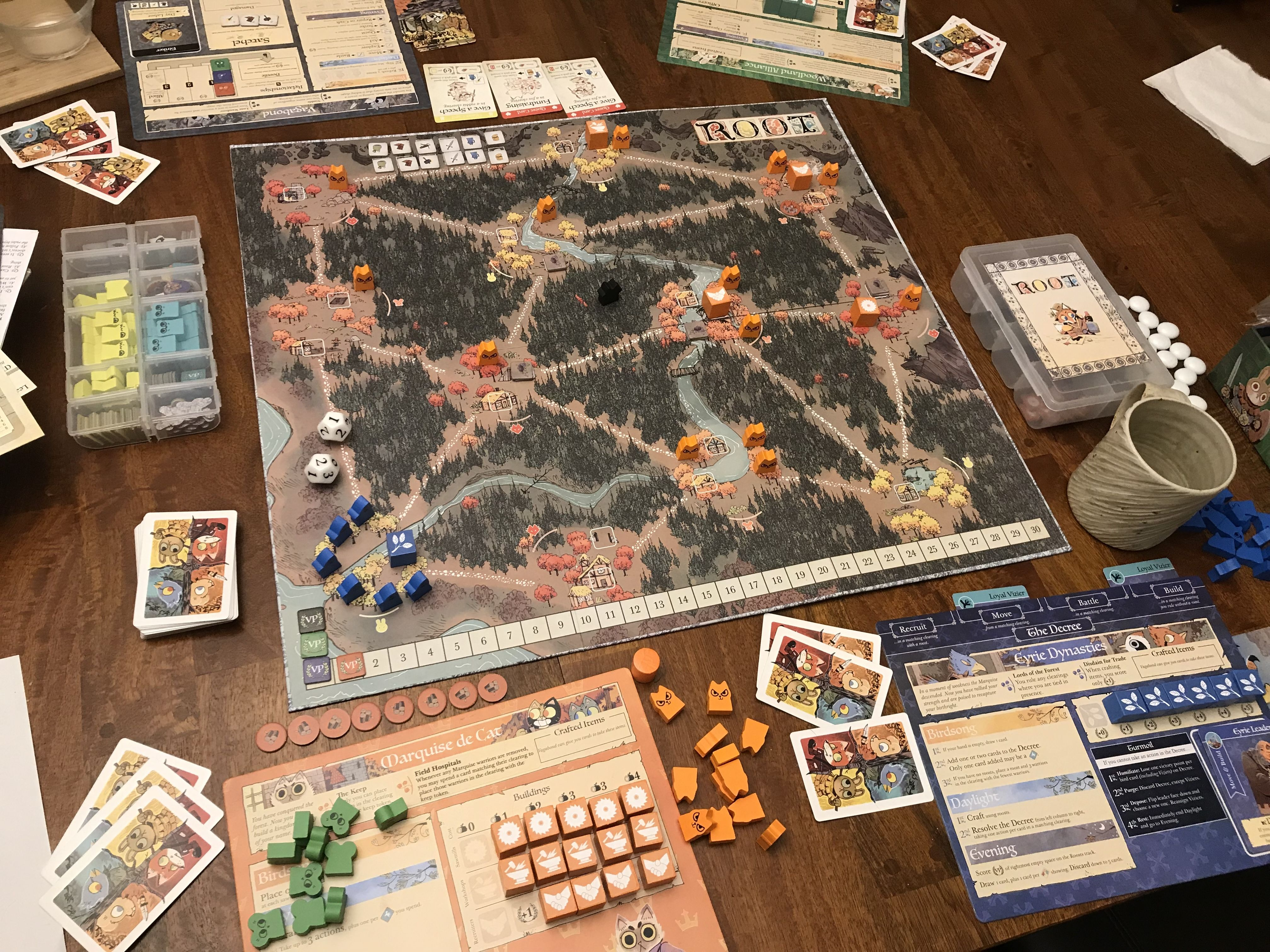
BoardGameGeek chose Root as its Game of the Year in 2018.

Since 2006, the site annually awards the best new board games of the year with the Golden Geek Award. Winners are selected based on a vote by registered users.

=== 2006–2009 ===
| Category | 2006 | 2007 | 2008 | 2009 |
|---|---|---|---|---|
| Game of the Year | Caylus | Shogun | Agricola | Dominion |
| Best Strategy Game | Caylus | Shogun | Agricola | Le Havre |
| Best Wargame | Twilight Struggle | Combat Commander: Europe | Hannibal: Rome vs. Carthage | Combat Commander: Pacific |
| Best Children's Board Game | Nacht Der Magier | Zooloretto | Chateau Roquefort | Sorry! Sliders |
| Best 2-Player Board Game | Twilight Struggle | BattleLore and Commands & Colors: Ancients | Hannibal: Rome vs. Carthage | Space Hulk (third edition) |
| Best Family Board Game | Ingenious | Zooloretto | Thebes | Pandemic |
| Best Party Board Game | Diamant | Wits and Wagers | Say Anything | Time's Up! Deluxe |
| Best Card Game | - | Caylus Magna Carta | Race for the Galaxy | Dominion |
| Best Board Game Artwork/Presentation | - | BattleLore | Jamaica | Space Hulk (third edition) |
| Best Board Game Expansion | - | - | - | Pandemic: On The Brink |
| Best Print & Play Board Game | - | - | - | Dune Express |
| Best Innovative Board Game | - | - | - | Space Alert |

=== 2010–2019 ===
| Category | 2010 | 2011 | 2012 | 2013 | 2014 | 2015 | 2016 | 2017 | 2018 | 2019 |
|---|---|---|---|---|---|---|---|---|---|---|
| Game of the Year | Hansa Teutonica | Dominant Species | Eclipse | Terra Mystica | Splendor | Pandemic Legacy: Season 1 | Scythe | Gloomhaven | Root | Wingspan |
| Best Strategy Game | Hansa Teutonica | Dominant Species | Eclipse | Terra Mystica | Five Tribes | Pandemic Legacy: Season 1 | Scythe | Gloomhaven | Brass: Birmingham | Wingspan |
| Best Wargame | Washington's War | A Few Acres of Snow | Sekigahara: The Unification of Japan | 1775: Rebellion | Fire in the Lake | Churchill | Falling Sky: The Gallic Revolt Against Caesar | 878 Vikings: Invasions of England | Hannibal & Hamilcar | Undaunted: Normandy |
| Best Children's Board Game | Forbidden Island | Animal Upon Animal: Balancing Bridge | King of Tokyo | Forbidden Desert | Tales & Games: The Hare & the Tortoise | - | - | - | - | - |
| Best 2-Player Board Game | Washington's War | A Few Acres of Snow | Android: Netrunner | Star Wars: X-Wing Miniatures Game | Star Realms | 7 Wonders Duel | Star Wars: Rebellion | Codenames: Duet | KeyForge: Call of the Archons | Watergate |
| Best Family Board Game | Tobago | 7 Wonders | King of Tokyo | Love Letter | Splendor | Codenames | Codenames: Pictures | Azul | The Quacks of Quedlinburg | Wingspan |
| Best Party Board Game | Telestrations | Dixit Odyssey | King of Tokyo | Love Letter | Cash n' Guns 2nd Ed. | Codenames | Codenames: Pictures | Warewords | The Mind | Wavelength |
| Best Card Game | Innovation | 7 Cudów Świata | Android: Netrunner | Love Letter | Star Realms | 7 Wonders Duel | Arkham Horror: The Card Game | Century: Spice Road | The Mind | Wingspan |
| Best Board Game Artwork/Presentation | - | Merchants & Marauders | Takenoko | Mice and Mystics | Abyss | Mysterium | Scythe | Photosynthesis | Root | Wingspan |
| Best Board Game Expansion | Dominion: Prosperity | Twilight Imperium: Shards of the Throne | Alien Frontiers: Factions | Lords of Waterdeep: Scoundrels of Skullport | 7 Wonders: Babel | Ticket to Ride Map Collection: Volume 5 United Kingdom & Pennsylvania | 7 Wonders Duel: Pantheon | Scythe: The Wind Gambit | Scythe: The Rise of Fenris | Wingspan: European Expansion |
| Best Print & Play Board Game | Zombie in My Pocket | The Thing | D-Day Dice: Free Trial Version | Tiny Epic Kingdoms & Coin Age | ...and then we held hands... | Dune: The dice game | Star Trek: The Dice Game | My Little Scythe | Orchard: A 9 card solitaire game | TINYforming Mars |
| Best Innovative Board Game | Catacombs | A Few Acres of Snow | Risk: Legacy | Love Letter | Dead of Winter: A Crossroads Game | Pandemic Legacy: Season 1 | Captain Sonar | Gloomhaven | Root | Wingspan |
| Best Thematic Board Game | War of the Ring Collector's Edition | Mansions of Madness | Mage Knight Board Game | Robinson Crusoe: Adventure on the Cursed Island | Dead of Winter: A Crossroads Game | Pandemic Legacy: Season 1 | Scythe | Gloomhaven | Root | Dune |
| Best Abstract Board Game | FITS | Paris Connection | Kingdom Builder | Tash-Kalar: Arena of Legends | Patchwork | - | - | - | - | - |
| Best Cooperative Game | - | - | - | - | - | - | Mechs vs. Minions | Gloomhaven | The Mind | The Crew: The Quest For Planet Nine |
| Best Solo Game | - | - | - | - | Imperial Settlers | Tiny Epic Galaxies | Scythe | Gloomhaven | That's Pretty Clever | Wingspan |

RPG and Video Game awards

RPG and Video game awards were introduced in 2014 and awarded through 2017. Only 1 category was awarded in 2018, and none in following years.

| Category | 2014 | 2015 | 2016 | 2017 | 2018 |
|---|---|---|---|---|---|
| Best RPG Artwork/Presentation | Player's Handbook (D&D 5e) | Mouse Guard (2nd Edition) | Volo's Guide to Monsters | Xanathar's Guide to Everything | - |
| Best RPG Supplement Winner | Dungeons & Dragons Starter Set | The Dracula Dossier: Director's Handbook | Volo's Guide to Monsters | Xanathar's Guide to Everything | - |
| RPG of the Year | Dungeon Master's Guide (D&D 5e) Player's Handbook (D&D 5e); Dungeons & Dragons (5th Edition) | Blades in the Dark | 7th Sea | Tales from the Loop | - |
| Best Indie Video Game Winner | Star Realms | Rocket League | Stardew Valley | Cuphead | - |
| Best Mobile/Handheld Video Game | Star Realms | Fallout Shelter | Twilight Struggle | Through the Ages | - |
| Best Video Game Visuals/Artwork | The Banner Saga | The Witcher 3: Wild Hunt | Overwatch | The Legend of Zelda: Breath of the Wild | - |
| Most Innovative Video Game | Galaxy Trucker | - | Pokémon GO | The Legend of Zelda: Breath of the Wild | - |
| Video Game of the Year Winner | Hearthstone: Heroes of Warcraft | Multiple Winners | Multiple Winners | Multiple Winners | - |
| Best Board Game App Winner | - | - | Twilight Struggle | Through the Ages | Ganz Schön Clever |

=== 2020–present ===
2020 saw many awards replaced with new categories, such as "Board Game of the Year" replaced with "Game of the Year, Light", "Medium" and "Heavy".

| Category | 2020 | 2021 | 2022 | 2023 | 2024 | 2025 |
|---|---|---|---|---|---|---|
| Game of the Year, Light | MicroMacro: Crime City | Cascadia | Cat in the Box: Deluxe Edition | Thunder Road: Vendetta | Castle Combo | Hot Streak |
| Game of the Year, Medium | Lost Ruins of Arnak | The Crew: Mission Deep Sea | Heat: Pedal to the Metal | Earth | Harmonies | The Lord of the Rings: Fate of the Fellowship |
| Game of the Year, Heavy | Gloomhaven: Jaws of the Lion | Ark Nova | Carnegie | Hegemony: Lead Your Class to Victory | SETI: Search for Extraterrestrial Intelligence | Galactic Cruise |
| Best Wargame | Imperial Struggle | Undaunted: Reinforcements | Undaunted: Stalingrad | Undaunted: Battle of Britain | Arcs | Star Wars: Battle of Hoth |
| Best 2-Player Board Game | Undaunted: North Africa | Radlands | Splendor Duel | Sky Team | The Lord of the Rings: Duel for Middle-earth | Toy Battle |
| Best Card Game | Dune: Imperium | - | - | - | - | - |
| Best Board Game Artwork & Presentation | On Mars | Sleeping Gods | Flamecraft | The Castles of Burgundy: Special Edition | Unconscious Mind | The Old King's Crown |
| Best Board Game Expansion | Wingspan: Oceania Expansion | Lost Ruins of Arnak: Expedition Leaders | Dune: Imperium – Rise of Ix | Ark Nova: Marine Worlds | Arcs: The Blighted Reach Expansion | SETI: Space Agencies |
| Best Print & Play Board Game | 7 Wonders Duel: Solo | Gloomholdin' | Aquamarine | Waypoints | 52 Realms: Adventures | Dungeons of the Oak Dell |
| Most Innovative Board Game | MicroMacro: Crime City | Oath: Chronicles of Empire and Exile | Cat in the Box: Deluxe Edition | Hegemony: Lead Your Class to Victory | Arcs | Vantage |
| Best Thematic Board Game | Gloomhaven: Jaws of the Lion | Sleeping Gods | Heat: Pedal to the Metal | Hegemony: Lead Your Class to Victory | SETI: Search for Extraterrestrial Intelligence | The Lord of the Rings: Fate of the Fellowship |
| Best Cooperative Game | Gloomhaven: Jaws of the Lion | The Crew: Mission Deep Sea | Return to Dark Tower | Sky Team | The Fellowship of the Ring: Trick-Taking Game | The Lord of the Rings: Fate of the Fellowship |
| Best Solo Board Game | Under Falling Skies | Final Girl | Turing Machine | Legacy of Yu | Slay the Spire: The Board Game | Vantage |
| Best Zoomable Game | Forgotten Waters | - | - | - | - | - |
| Best Party Game | - | So Clover! | Ready Set Bet | That's Not a Hat | Flip 7 | Hot Streak |
| Best Podcast | So Very Wrong About Games | Board Game Barrage | This Game Is Broken | One Stop Co-Op Shop | Beyond Solitaire | Board Game Hot Takes |
| Best Board Game App | Root (2020) | Gloomhaven | Everdell | Unmatched: Digital Edition | Dune: Imperium | Ark Nova |

== See also ==
- Amerigame
- Eurogame
- Going Cardboard (documentary)
