= Everdell =

2018 board game

- Designers: James Wilson
- Illustrators: Andrew Bosley
- Publishers: Starling Games
- Publication: 2018; 8 years ago
- Players: 1–4 (standard); 1–6 (with Bellfaire expansion)
- Playing time: 40–80 minutes
- Website: https://tycoongames.com/pages/everdell https://www.direwolfdigital.com/everdell/

Everdell is a board game for 1 to 4 players (or 1 to 6 players with expansions) designed by James Wilson and published by Starling Games in 2018. In the game, players take the role of forest animals building a city over four seasons by collecting resources, recruiting workers, and constructing buildings. The game has been well regarded by reviewers, with its art and components receiving strong praise.

A follow-up to the game called Farshore was released in December 2023. Farshore is a standalone title set in the same world as Everdell, featuring nautical themes, a new map board, and revised worker-placement mechanics. Published by Tabletop Tycoon. In 2025, another standalone expansion, Everdell Silverfrost, was released and features frost seasons, new forest cards, and updated event mechanics. It expands the thematic world of Everdell and incorporates revised balance adjustments to align with previous expansions.

== Gameplay ==
Over four seasons, players place their forest animal meeples to get resources to buy cards into a personal tableau, which give points towards winning the game or special abilities to help them build further. The game starts simply, with the complexity increasing as a player's cards gain synergies from newly acquired cards. In addition to the points they get from acquiring cards, players score by triggering events, from special events, from collecting certain combinations of card types, and from end game bonuses given by cards for acquiring certain other cards in their city. Later expansions and standalone titles, such as Farshore and Silverfrost, introduce alternative environments and seasonal effects that modify worker placement and card interaction strategies. These versions maintain the core tableau-building mechanics of Everdell while adding new elements such as map exploration and resource management under changing seasonal conditions.

== Reception ==
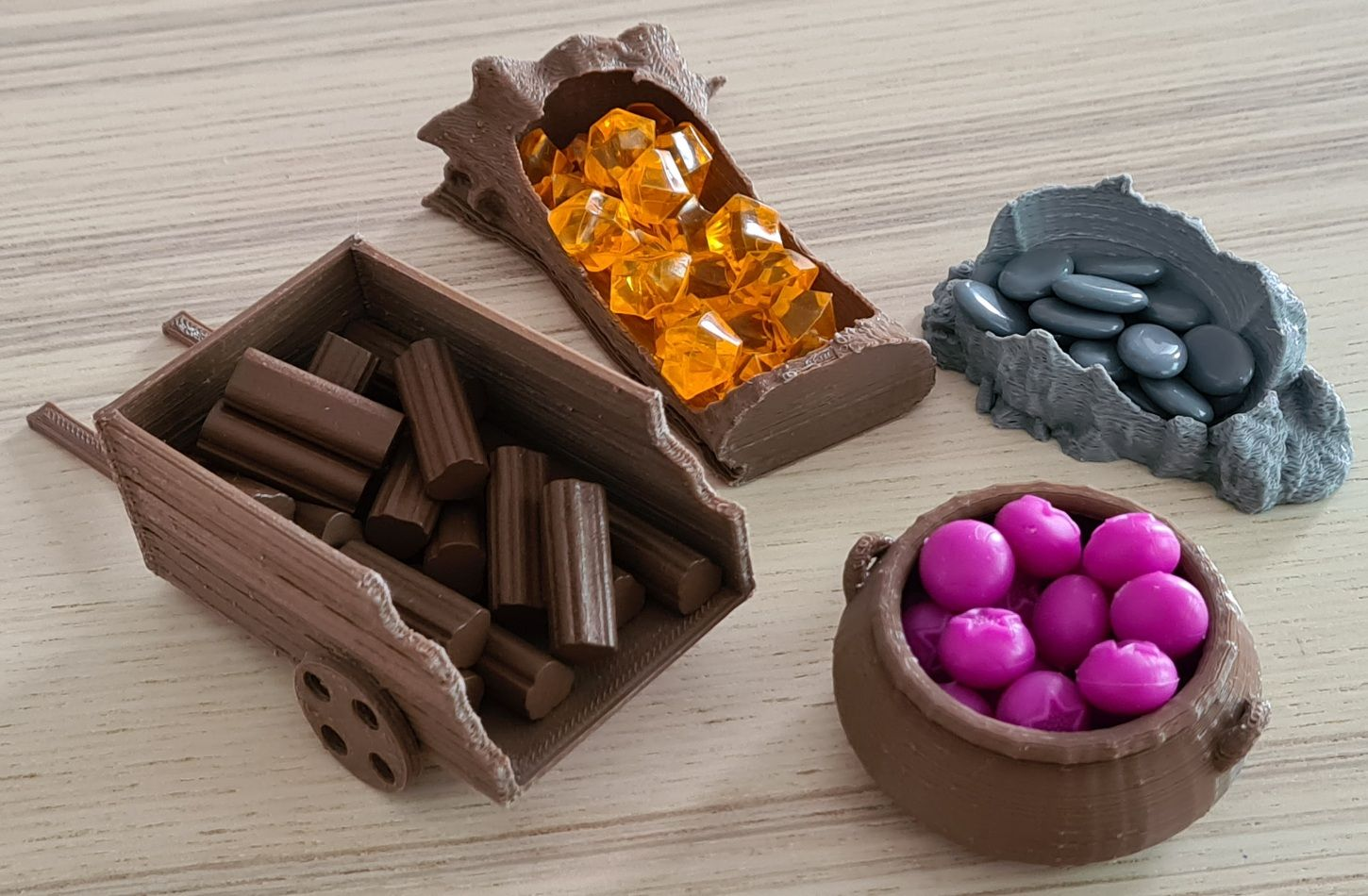
Components of the game

Keith Law of Paste Magazine and Vulture dubbed Everdell one of the best new board games of 2018, praising its gameplay, forest animal theme, and "gorgeous" art and components. Smithsonian also called it one of the best games of 2018, lavishing praise on the tactile components, such as the hefty coins, squishy berries, and three dimensional tree which holds the cards available for purchase. The magazine also listed The Complete Collection edition as one of the best games of 2022.

Everdell was nominated for a Golden Geek award for Best Artwork and Presentation.

== Expansions ==
Starling Games have run several successful Kickstarter campaigns to fund expansions for the game.

The first expansion Pearlbrook released in 2019 after being funded via Kickstarter in September 2018. The expansion gives players frog ambassadors who can collect pearls and trade with undersea creatures.

Two more expansions were funded by another Kickstarter in September 2019. Spirecrest adds a new Mountain board that players can explore in addition to various new card types. Bellfaire adds several modules to the game including unique player powers, a new market location and rules to support 5–6 players.

A third kickstarter in September 2021 funded two more expansions. Newleaf adds a new station board and several train-themed components. Mistwood adds a new gamemode designed for solo or two player games. A version of the game titled Everdell: The Complete Collection containing all 5 expansions was also funded during this Kickstarter. The expansions and Complete Collection were released in 2023.

A simplified version of the base game aimed at a younger audience called My Lil' Everdell was published in 2022.

Farshore, a standalone game in the same Everdell universe released in 2023, moves the setting to a coastal region where players explore a nautical map, gather maritime resources, and race to complete seafaring expeditions. The game refines resource management and progression pacing from the original design while emphasizing exploration and variable setup between sessions. Silverfrost, released in 2025, expands the series into a winter-themed environment and introduces frost seasons, new terrain tiles, big critter helpers, and revised forest and event cards.

Title	Year	Type	Key Features	Publisher	References
Pearlbrook	2019	Expansion	Adds river board, frog ambassadors, aquatic cards, and new resources.	Starling Games	
Spirecrest	2020	Expansion	Adds mountain exploration and weather events.	Starling Games	
Bellfaire	2020	Expansion	Adds player powers, a new market location, and expanded tableau limits.	Starling Games	
Newleaf	2022	Expansion	Adds train station, new critters, and travel cards.	Starling Games	
Mistwood	2022	Expansion	Adds solo mode and automated opponent (“Nightweave”).	Starling Games	
Farshore	2023	Standalone	Introduces nautical setting, map exploration, and new resources.	Tabletop Tycoon	
Silverfrost	2025	Standalone	Adds frost seasons, terrain tiles, and balance refinements.	Tabletop Tycoon	
Emerland	2026	Standalone	Adds a new jungle-themed region with new cards, exploration, and artifact mechanics.	Tabletop Tycoon	

== Digital edition ==
A video game adaptation developed by Dire Wolf Digital was released in July 2022 on Steam, iOS and Android. A Nintendo Switch version was released in September 2022.
