= Watergate (board game) =

2019 board game

- Designers: Matthias Cramer
- Publishers: Capstone Games
- Publication: 2019
- Languages: English, German
- Players: 2
- Playing time: 30-60 minutes
- Chance: Low to medium
- Age range: 12+

Watergate is a 2019 board game published by Capstone Games. Players take on the roles of either Richard Nixon or the editors of various newspapers during the Watergate scandal, and play cards that could gain momentum, initiative, evidence or informant tokens. The Nixon administration wins the game if five momentum tokens are gained, whereas the editor wins if two informant tokens are connected, thus breaking the story. Watergate received positive reviews.

== Gameplay ==
Players assume the roles of Nixon or journalists from The Washington Post. During each turn, the value part or the action part of an event card could be played. The value parts move tokens on the research track, whereas the action part gives unique benefits depending on the player's role, but are removed upon use. For example, the Pentagon Papers token allows an evidence token to be placed onto the board. Numerous event cards allow informants to be placed either face up for the editors or face down for Nixon. The Nixon administration and editors both also have other conspirator and journalist cards, which are similar to event cards, but are not removed when the action part is used.

At the end of each round, which comprises four or five actions for each player, players gain any tokens on their side. Evidence tokens can be placed face-up by the editors connecting to the informants, or face down by the administration to obstruct the connection. The game ends when Nixon gains all five momentum tokens or if the editor connects two informants to the centre.

== Release ==
Watergate was designed by Matthias Cramer, who previously designed the worker placement title Glen More. The game was published in 2019 in German and English by Frosted Games and Capstone Games.

== Reception ==
Upon its release, Watergate received positive reviews. Ars Technica listed it as one of the best two-player games, and commended thematic value, with the "explanatory text" from the cards and rulebooks. Writing for the Paste Magazine, Keith Law agreed and praised the mechanics and the "well explained and depicted" theme through the "extensive appendix" of the rulebook, but criticised that the card powers did not have "any real relationship to the various personages or events the game cards". In conclusion, he stated that it was one of the best new two-player games.

Alexandra Sonechkina from the Tabletop Magazine said that the tug-of-war mechanism for the tokens were engaging and "incredibly tight", and also observed that the theme added "visual flavour to its components and artwork, as well as knowledge of its historical background", but that the game could also be viewed from a "completely abstract lens". A Just Push Start review also described the "heavily themed abstract style experience" and the mechanics, including the tug-of-war and timing of using cards.

== Awards ==
Year	Game	Award	Result
2019	Watergate	Gra Roku Best Two Player Game	Won
2020	Watergate	Origin Award best Historical Game	Nominated
