= Thunder Road (board game) =

1986 board game

- Other names: Le Survivant
- Designers: Jim Keifer
- Illustrators: Paul Alexander
- Publishers: Milton Bradley
- Publication: 1986; 40 years ago
- Years active: 1986–present
- Genres: Board game
- Languages: English
- Players: 2–4
- Playing time: 45'
- Age range: 10+

Thunder Road (a.k.a. ThunderRoad, Le Survivant) is a post-apocalyptic themed racing board game invented by Jim Keifer and published by Milton Bradley. Using an assortment of four different vehicles each ranging from a modified dune buggy to a gyrocopter, players must race down an infinite roadway against one another. The goal of the game for players is to either be the last player team alive (e.g., eliminate all other player vehicle teams) or simply out race (i.e., out distance) the other teams. Although the game was originally published by Milton Bradley in 1986, Hasbro currently owns the rights to the game, since it acquired Milton Bradley in 1984 (though a modernized version, Thunder Road: Vendetta was released in 2023 by Restoration Games).

== Game play ==
After the game pieces have been assembled (first time setup time can be approximately ten minutes due to game piece complexity), the switch & link game board has been set up with its appropriate hazard areas (wrecks), and player colors have been selected play begins. Initial play consists of each player rolling three yellow dice and moving their vehicles for the number of spaces rolled on a per die per vehicle basis. Once all players have done this, the rest of the game proceeds with each player rolling to move and also trying to attack opposing player vehicles.

Attacks can be done by a player ramming their vehicle into their opposition's vehicle, shooting at their opponent's vehicle with vehicle-mounted artillery or using their aerial vehicle (the Thunder Chopper) to attack. As play progresses along the game board, it is constantly extended by using the back portion of the board; the Rear Board. Indeed, a way in which a player can beat an opponent is by getting all of their cars and chopper onto the forward-most game board (Lead Board) faster than their opponent's vehicles. If a player is lagging too far behind and is still on the rear-most game board section (Rear Board) by the time another player has reached the end of the Lead Board, any vehicles on that portion of board are permanently removed from the game; this suggests that the car was "outrun". An exception to this rule applies only to the Thunder Chopper, it can stay in play as long as a player has at least one running car remaining.
