= Tākina =

Convention and exhibition facility in Wellington

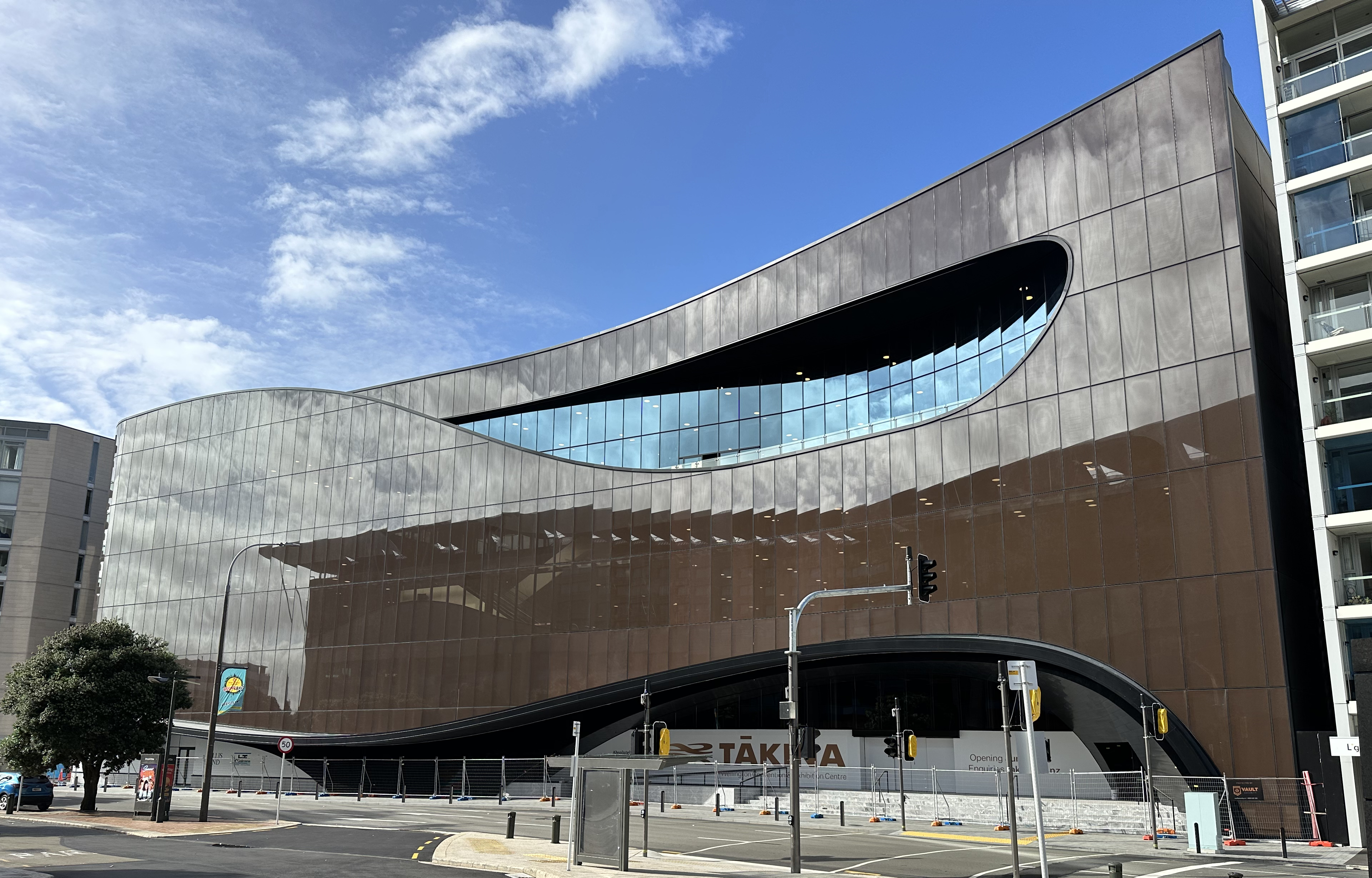
- Interactive map of Tākina
- Address: 50 Cable Street
- Location: Te Aro, Wellington, New Zealand
- Coordinates: 41.29128°S 174.78109°E
- Owner: Wellington City Council
- Operator: Te Papa

Construction
- Opened: 31 May 2023; 2 years ago
- Construction cost: NZ$ 180 million
- Architect: Studio Pacific Architecture

Website
- https://www.takina.co.nz/

Tākina is a convention centre in Wellington, New Zealand. The name means "to invoke, to summon, to connect, or to bring forth" in the Māori language. The building's main entrance is on Cable Street opposite Te Papa, the Museum of New Zealand, and there is another public entrance on Wakefield Street. Tākina is owned by Wellington City Council.

== Background ==
Proposals for a new convention centre in Wellington go back at least to the 1990s. In 1998, then-Mayor Mark Blumsky was interested in turning the failing Queens Wharf retail centre into a convention centre. At that time conventions were being held at Te Papa, the Town Hall and Michael Fowler Centre (known together as the Wellington Convention Centre), Victoria University and at hotels. The chief executive of the Wellington Chamber of Commerce didn't think a large venue was needed and asked if conventions should be a core business for the city council.

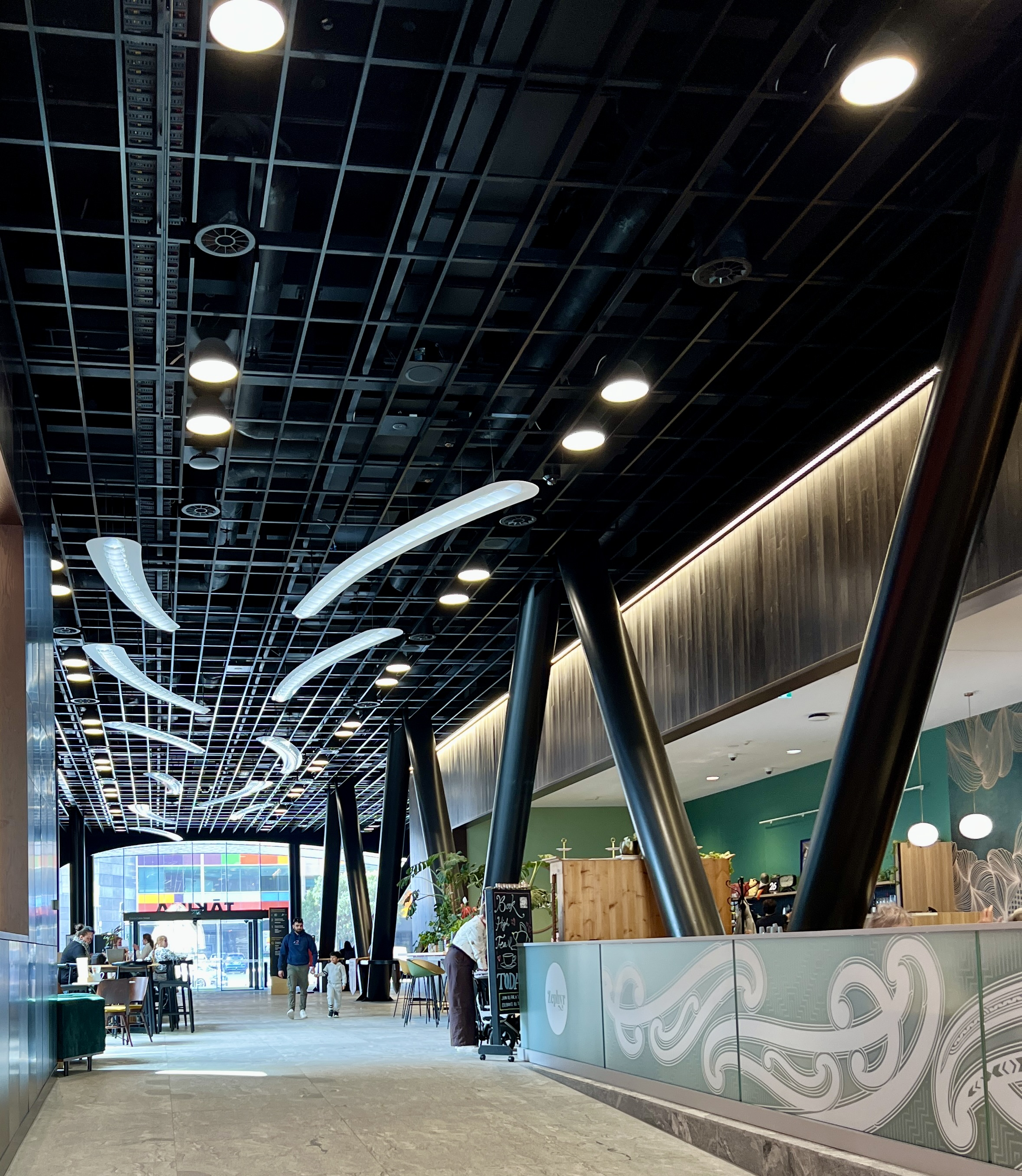
Ground floor of Tākina, with the café at right.

By 2002, Wellington was second to Auckland as the most popular convention destination in New Zealand. Tourism organisation Totally Wellington supported a new convention centre, saying Wellington needed more high-quality tourism facilities. Then-Mayor Kerry Prendergast said that funding a convention centre was a low priority for Wellington City Council and "not on the agenda".

In 2014, there was a proposal to build a Hilton Hotel and convention centre on the Cable Street site. The project would be built and owned by local developer Mark Dunajtschik, and the convention centre leased from him by Wellington City Council. Then-Mayor Celia Wade-Brown supported the project, but the proposal came to nothing after Dunajtschik and the owner of the Cable Street site, Arrowtown-based company director Andrew Wall, could not agree on a price.

In 2015, there were plans for a convention centre and movie museum on the site. The movie museum was a project by Sir Peter Jackson and Sir Richard Taylor. This project was cancelled in August 2018 after Wellington City Council and the Movie Museum Ltd could not agree on financial and other aspects of the deal. In December 2018, Wellington City Council voted to go ahead with a revised plan for a convention centre and exhibition space on the Cable Street site.

== Design ==
The building was designed by Studio Pacific Architecture and financed by Wellington City Council. It cost NZ$180 million, including the cost of the land. Construction took nearly three years, and the convention centre was formally opened on 31 May 2023.

Tākina's façade is clad in glass with a flowing organic form. The architects state that:

Tākina has a unique sculptural form that draws inspiration from a wide range of sources including its maritime location, Wellington's dramatic, and sometimes wild, weather patterns, and landforms. It also draws from Maori mythology, specifically 'Te Ūpoko-o-Te-Ika-o-Māui' Maui's head of the fish. The legend refers to the forming of Te Whanganui a Tara – Wellington's unique harbour and waterfront geology and topography.

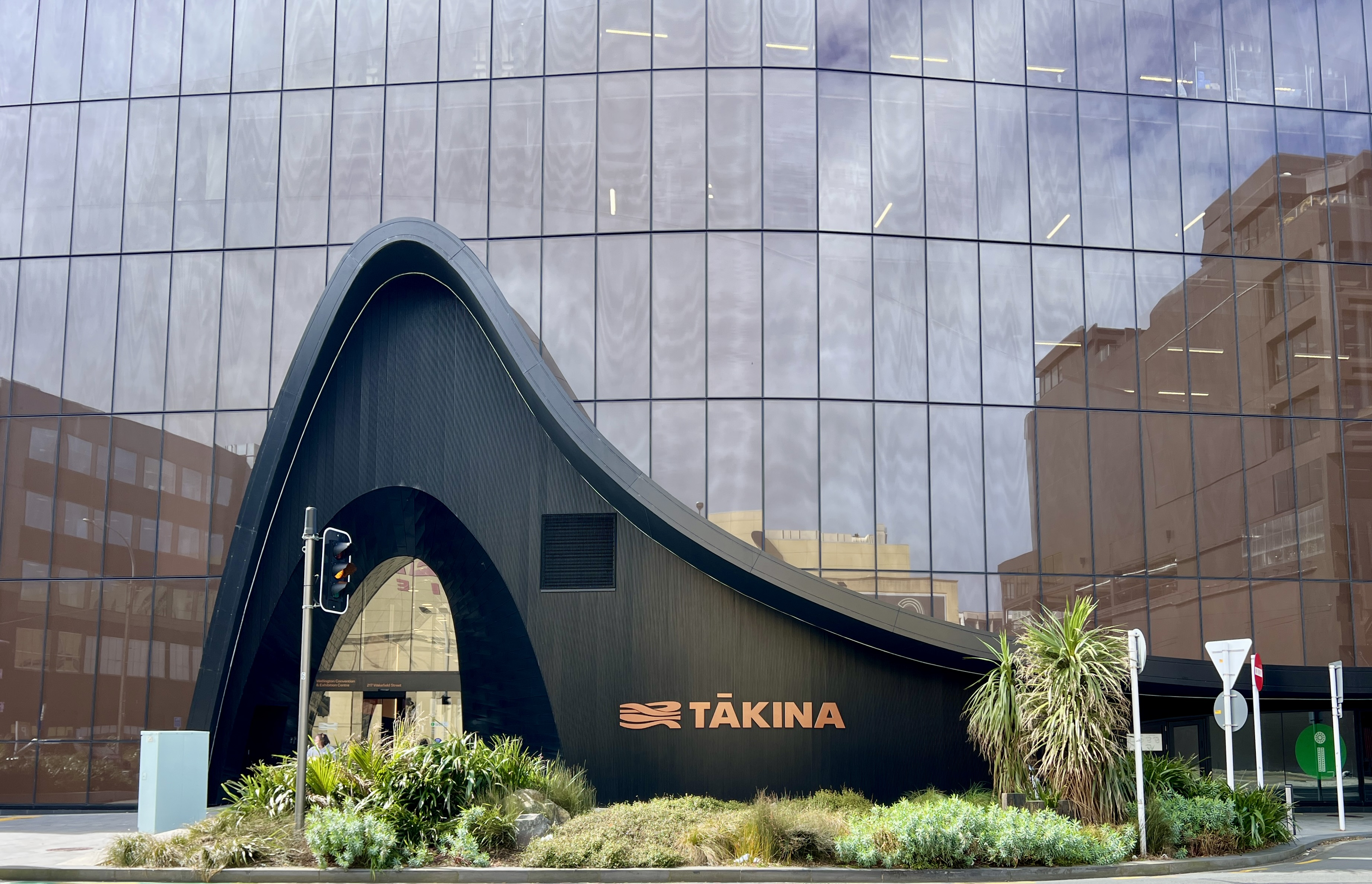
South entrance

The building is located on a 5500m^{2} site owned by Wellington City Council that was previously used by car rental companies and as carparks. It has 18,000m^{2} of space over three storeys and three mezzanine floors. The building has 32 base isolators for earthquake resilience. There is a 1280m^{2} exhibition space on the ground floor which at the time of opening was the largest gallery in New Zealand. It was specifically designed to allow New Zealand to host international touring exhibitions and provide changing visitor attractions. The ground floor also includes a large lobby, a café, retail space and i-Site, a Wellington visitor information centre. The two upper levels of Tākina consist of convention halls and auditoriums along with kitchen and other facilities. The convention spaces can be configured in various ways to host up to 1,600 attendees.

=== Sustainability ===
Tākina has a five-star Green Star certification for its design and is the first conference centre in New Zealand to meet this standard. The building has various features which enable it to use 60–70% less energy and emit 60–70% less carbon than other similar buildings. Sustainability features include thermal insulation and double glazing; a 30,000 litre rainwater harvesting system for toilet flushing and evaporative cooling; demand-controlled air conditioning; and provision for future addition of a solar array.

Tākina won a variety of Wellington, New Zealand and international awards for its architecture and design. Tākina won the Public Architecture category in the 2024 Wellington Architecture Awards and took second place at the World-Architects 'Building of the Year' awards in February 2025.

== Visitor numbers ==
When the convention centre was opened it was estimated that 500,000 people would visit each year, but in May 2025, Wellington City Council stated that there were only 300,000 visitors annually. The first three exhibitions at Tākina did not attract the expected visitor numbers, and the centre made less revenue than expected. Wellington Chamber of Commerce chief executive Simon Arcus suggested that Tākina's business model needed to be examined, while Mayor Tory Whanau blamed inflation, the cost of living and a decrease in business-related travel. Te Papa's spokeswoman Kate Camp acknowledged that the post-Covid operating environment was more challenging than envisaged by the original business case. Te Papa had been in charge of operating the centre but after a review in late 2024 it was decided that marketing, communications and public relations would move from Te Papa to WellingtonNZ, which is the city council's tourism agency.

In May 2025, Wellington City Council stated that people visiting Wellington for conferences or exhibitions at Tākina had increased the city's economy by more than $50 million each year.
