= A few acres of snow =

Quotation by Voltaire deriding Canada

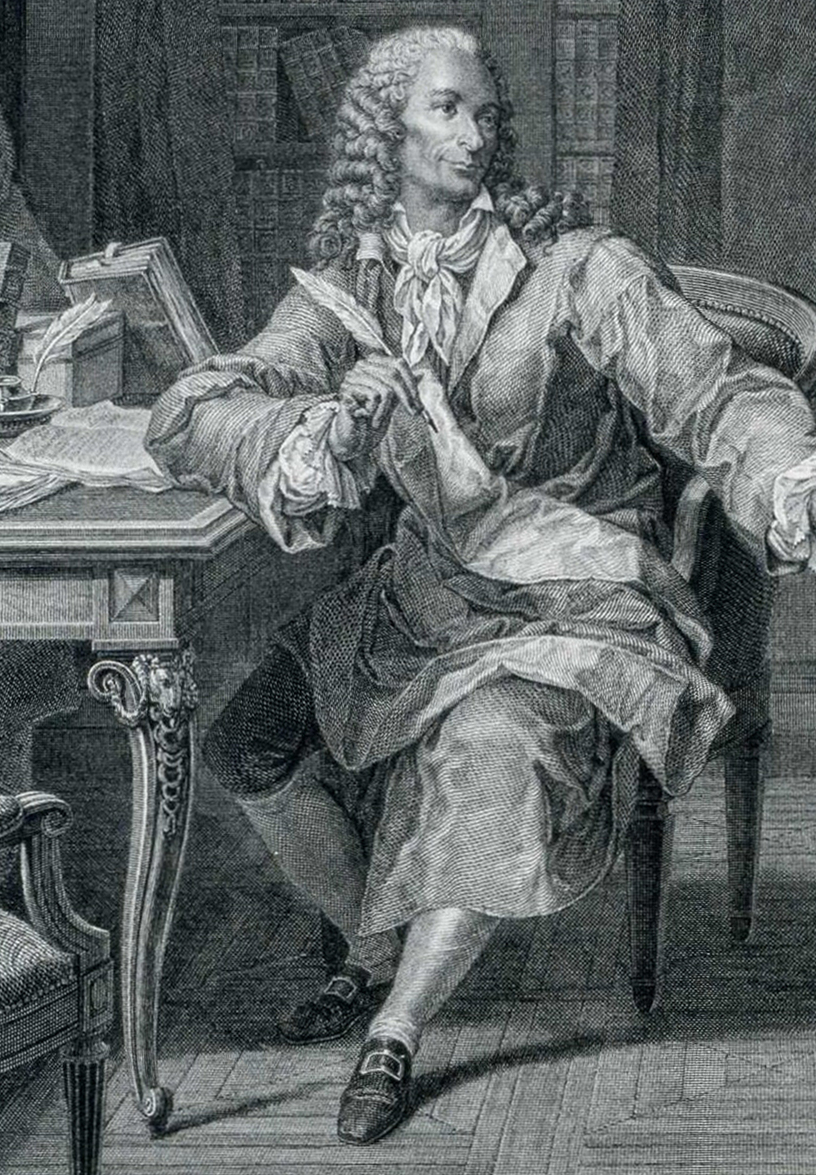
c. 1800 engraving of Voltaire at his writing desk

"A few acres of snow" (in the original French, "quelques arpents (Note: Although generally translated as "acres", the arpent is actually an old French unit of land measurement, about 0.85 acres (0.34 hectares).) de neige", French pronunciation: [kɛlkə.z‿aʁpɑ̃dəˈnɛːʒ], with "vers le Canada") is one of several quotations from 18th-century French writer Voltaire, indicative of his sneering evaluation of the colony of Canada as lacking economic value and strategic importance to 18th-century France.

In Voltaire's time, Canada was the name of a territory of New France that covered most of modern-day southern Quebec. However, "Canada" was also commonly used as a generic term to cover all of New France, including the whole of the Louisiana Territory, as well as modern-day southern Ontario, Labrador, New Brunswick, and Prince Edward Island. The meaning of "Canada" that Voltaire intended is a matter of some dispute.

The exact phrase "quelques arpents de neige" first appears in 1759 in chapter 23 of Voltaire's book Candide, but the phrase "a few acres of ice" appeared in a letter he wrote in 1757. Voltaire wrote similar sarcastic remarks in other works.

== Background ==
In Voltaire's day, New France included Canada, Acadia, Louisiana, and other territories. All of those colonies were the object of Voltaire's sarcastic comments at one point or another.

Through all his writings on the subject, Voltaire's basic idea about France's Canadian colony always remained the same. It can be summarized as comprising an economic premise and a strategic premise, both of which concur to a practical conclusion, as follows:

- Almost the entirety of Canada's territory is and will remain an unproductive and useless frozen wasteland.
- Great Britain, having establishing colonies on the more productive territories to the south and to the east (the Thirteen Colonies), and provided them with a much larger population, will not tolerate the presence of another European power in that area and will relentlessly attack Canada until such presence is ousted. Given the enormous disproportion in population and material resources between the French and British colonies in North America, the impossibility of modifying that imbalance in the foreseeable future and Britain's generally-better control of the maritime routes to Europe, Britain will inevitably prevail sooner or later.
- Therefore, an effective defence of Canada by France requires an extraordinarily large commitment of resources in comparison to the scant economic value in return, and any resources thus expended, even if they allowed victories in the short term, are wasted as they can serve at best only to postpone for a few more decades the handing over of Canada to Britain, which is inevitable in the long term. Consequently, sound economic policy dictates handing over Canada to Britain as soon as possible and concentrating France's resources in its West Indian colonies, which are more valuable economically and more readily defensible.

The year 1758 included the Battle of Fort Frontenac (August 26–28, a French defeat) and French naval secretary Nicolas René Berryer's October refusal to provide Louis Antoine de Bougainville with much-needed reinforcements to defend Quebec City. According to Berryer, "one should not try to save the stables when the house is on fire" (infamously, « qu'on ne cherche point à sauver les écuries quand le feu est à la maison »). The British siege of Québec City ended in a French defeat in the Battle of the Plains of Abraham in September 1759, and Montréal surrendered the next year.

Today's critics of Voltaire's opinion are directed primarily at his economic assessment of the Canadian colony. Voltaire's idea of the Canadian colony based essentially on fur trade was even during his own writings already outdated by almost a century. Thus, although it may be difficult to determine exactly what part of his depiction of Canada might be attributed to deliberate exaggeration for polemical purposes, attachment to a preconceived idea, or mere misinformation, his few writings on the subject seem to display a certain level of short-sightedness regarding the actual level of economic evolution that had already been reached in the settled parts of Canada and about the colony's potential for further development.

On the other hand, Voltaire's assessment of the heavy financial burden required for France's military defence of Canada and of the practical impossibility of such defence in the long term remains valid. Consequently, if he had espoused a more favourable idea of the economic potential of the colony, it would likely not have changed his general conclusion.

Voltaire's famous quotations about New France were for the most part written between 1753 and 1763, shortly before and then during the Seven Years' War. Voltaire was living in Switzerland during most of that period. During the war, he sometimes appeared to favor King Frederick II of Prussia, who was allied with Britain against France. They maintained a regular personal correspondence during the war and were on better terms again after their quarrel of 1753.

Voltaire was also then in correspondence with some French ministers. He thus corresponded with both sides of the belligerents in the war although mostly on personal and literary levels, rather than a political level. Thinking that the war was a mistake for France, he used several opportunities to ask the French ministers to simply quit the war. Boundary disputes in their American colonies had been an early casus belli between Britain and France in 1754 in the war, which was in 1756 further complicated by purely-European considerations and ended in 1763. Voltaire's position that France should let go of its North American colonies was in accord with his position about the war in general. For Voltaire, handing over New France would appease Britain. His position about the European war likely increased his tendency to paint New France as being of little value.

== Quotations in their textual context ==
These quotations are presented in chronological order.

=== 1753 — Essai sur les mœurs et l'esprit des nations ===
Chapter 151 — Of the possessions of the French in America:

Already the English were taking possession of the best lands and of those most advantageously situated that could be possessed in northern America beyond Florida, when two or three merchants from Normandy, on the slight hope of a small commerce of furs, equipped a few vessels, and established a colony in Canada, a country covered with snows and ices eight months of the year, inhabited by barbarians, bears and beavers. That land, already discovered as early as 1535, had been abandoned but, after several attempts, ineffectively supported by a government that did not possess a navy, a small company of merchants from Dieppe and St. Malo founded Québec, in 1608, that is to say, built a few cabins; and those cabins became a city only under Louis XIV.

...Those bad countries have nonetheless been an almost continual object of war, either with the natives, or with the English, who, being the possessors of the best territories, wanted to take that of the French, so as to be the sole masters of the commerce of that boreal part of the world.

...Colonies were sent to the Mississippi (1717 and 1718); the plan was set of a wonderful and regular city, named the New Orleans. Most of the settlers perished from misery, and the city was reduced to a few bad houses. Maybe one day, if there are millions of inhabitants in excess in France, will it be advantageous to populate Louisiana, but it is more likely that it will have to be abandoned.

=== 1756 — Letter to François Tronchin ===
In this letter to François Tronchin, written at Monriond, near Lausanne, dated January 29, 1756, Voltaire mentions the earthquake that destroyed Lisbon, Portugal, on November 1, 1755.

The war is serious, then. I wish the earthquake had engulfed that miserable Acadia instead of Lisbon and Mequines.

=== 1757 — Letter to Mr de Moncrif ===
This letter from Voltaire to François-Augustin de Paradis de Moncrif (1687–1770), written at Monrion, near Lausanne, on March 27, 1757, contains the first known direct use by Voltaire of his famous turn of phrase "a few acres of ice in Canada." Also of note is the clear preposition of location "in Canada." The relevant passage of the letter reads as follows:

...I am a bad actor in the winter in Lausanne and I have success in the roles of old men, I am a gardener in the spring, in Mes Délices near Geneva, in a climate more southern than yours. From my bed I see the lake, the Rhône and another river. Do you have, my dear colleague, a better view? Do you have tulips in the month of March? Also, one dabbles in some philosophy and some history, one mocks the follies of the human race, and the charlatanism of our physicists who believe that they have measured the Earth, and of those who pass for wise men because they have said that eels are made with sourdough. One pities that poor human race that slits its throat on our continent about a few acres of ice in Canada. One is free as the air from morning to evening. My orchards, my vineyards and me, we do not owe anything to anyone.

The sentence from Voltaire's letter to Moncrif has been quoted often. The 19th-century writer Jules Verne (1828–1905) quoted it in his novel A Family without a name (Famille sans nom), published in 1889, which was set in the Canada of 1837 during the Lower Canada Rebellion. The famous sentence is quoted in Chapter 1 of the novel, which has likely contributed to the quotation's popularity.

=== 1758 — Candide ===
Voltaire used his "few acres of ice" phrase again the following year, slightly modified, in his novel Candide (written in 1758 and published in 1759) although "ice" was now replaced by "snow". The "snow" version of 1758 has generally become better known today in Canada than the "ice" version of 1757, perhaps because Candide is sometimes used in high school courses. The relevant passage appears in chapter 23 of Candide, l when two characters of the novel are exchanging thoughts about France and Britain:

You know that these two nations are at war about a few acres of snow somewhere around Canada, and that they are spending on this beautiful war more than all Canada is worth.

In the original French version, Voltaire uses the phrase "... pour quelques arpents de neige vers le Canada," and the preposition "vers" did not have the usual meaning that it now has in French. Instead, "vers" was commonly used by Voltaire in his writings to express a general meaning of vagueness about an area in the general sense of "somewhere in or around the general area." It is apparent from the whole of his writings that he viewed or pretended to view, Canada as a vast icy and snowy area. Thus, it is immaterial to ponder if by "a few acres" Voltaire had in mind one of the areas in dispute in 1754, such as the Ohio Valley (in itself hardly an insignificant patch of land) or the Acadian border. By 1758, the war had extended to all possessions of the belligerents. Under Voltaire's pen, the term is deliberately vague, and the point of using it is to convey the idea that any acres of land in the general area of Canada are so unimportant that even their location is not worth worrying about.

=== 1760 — Letter from Étienne de Choiseul ===
Although not a Voltaire quotation, this letter from Étienne François, duc de Choiseul (1719–1785), French Secretary of State (minister) for Foreign Affairs, to Voltaire, is an example of the correspondence between Voltaire and the French ministry and of Choiseul's dry humour in the manner he informs Voltaire of the fall of Canada:

Versailles, October 12 ...I have learned that we have lost Montréal and consequently all of Canada. If you relied on us for this winter's furs, I advise you that it is with the English that you must deal.

=== 1760 — Letter to the marquis de Chauvelin ===
In this letter to Bernard-François, marquis de Chauvelin (1716–1773), written at Les Délices, Voltaire's property near Geneva, on November 3, 1760, Voltaire writes:

Would I dare, I would beg you on my knees to forever rid the government of France from Canada. If you lose it, you lose almost nothing; if you want it returned to you, all you will be returned is an eternal cause of war and humiliation. Consider that the English are at least fifty to one in northern America.

=== 1762 — Letter to César Gabriel de Choiseul ===
This letter from Voltaire to César Gabriel de Choiseul (1712–1785), who had replaced his cousin Étienne de Choiseul as French Secretary of State for Foreign Affairs in 1761, was written at Les Délices, on September 6, 1762 and is one of the best known of Voltaire's letters about Canada and is mentioned anecdotally in some high school history textbooks. A short letter, it can be quoted in full:

Aux Délices 6 septembre 1762 If I wanted to speak only for myself, milord, I would remain silent in the crisis of affairs where you find yourself. But I hear the voices of many strangers, all saying that you must be blessed if you make peace, whatever the cost. Therefore, allow me, milord, to compliment you. I am like the public, I like peace more than Canada, and I believe that France can be happy without Québec. You give us precisely what we need. We owe you our gratitude. Until then, please receive, with your usual kindness, the deep respect of Voltaire.

=== 1763 — Précis du siècle de Louis XV ===
The Précis was written by Voltaire over several years. These relevant passages were likely written in or after 1763.

Chapter 31 — The state of Europe in 1756 - ... - Disastrous wars for some territories somewhere in Canada - ...

The revolutions that the aforementioned king of Prussia and his enemies were preparing were thenceforth a fire that smouldered under embers. That fire soon spread to Europe, but the first sparks came from America. A slight quarrel between France and England, about some savage lands somewhere around Acadia, inspired a new politic to all the sovereigns of Europe.

Chapter 35 — Losses of the French

In one day were lost fifteen hundred leagues of land. Those fifteen hundred leagues, the three quarters of which are frozen deserts, were perhaps not a real loss. If one tenth of the money engulfed in that colony had been used to clear our uncultivated lands in France, it would have brought a considerable benefit, but it had been decided to support Canada, and one hundred years of effort were lost with all the money invested without benefit in return.

...

The State lost, during that disastrous war, the most flourishing youth, more than half the money that circulated in the realm, its navy, its commerce, its credit. One would have believed that it would have been very easy to prevent so many woes through some accommodation with the English for a small litigious patch of land somewhere in Canada, but a few ambitious, to acquire prestige and to render themselves necessary, precipitated France into this fatal war.

=== 1763 — Letter to d'Argental ===
Although the quotation is not directly in it, this letter from Voltaire to Charles-Augustin de Ferriol d'Argental (date uncertain, likely around 1763) illustrates Voltaire's position and actions about the matter:

Will the government not forgive me for having said that the English took Canada, which I had, incidentally, offered, four years ago, to sell to the English, which would have ended everything, and which Mr Pitt's brother had proposed to me.

== Modern usage ==
The phrase continues to be referenced in the modern era. Canadian poet Louis-Honoré Fréchette took his revenge on Voltaire in his poem "Sous la statue de Voltaire" ("Under the statue of Voltaire"), published in La Légende d'un Peuple (1887).

Quelques arpents de neige is the title of a 1972 movie by Denis Héroux, also known by the English title The Rebels. "Pour quelques arpents de neige" is a 1972 song by Claude Léveillée, written for the film.

In the 1980s, the marketers of the Quebec edition of the game Trivial Pursuit punningly named their product "Quelques arpents de pièges" (A few acres of traps).

The name of the board game A Few Acres of Snow is derived from this phrase. Designed by Martin Wallace, it is about the French and British conflict over what is now Canada.
