= Final Girl (board game) =

2021 board game about final girls

- Designers: Evan Derrick; A. J. Porfirio
- Illustrators: Tyler Johnson; Roland MacDonald
- Publishers: Van Ryder Games
- Publication: 2021; 5 years ago
- Genres: Card game; Horror game
- Players: 1
- Playing time: 20–60 minutes
- Age range: 14+

Final Girl is a single-player horror board game about final girls designed by Evan Derrick and A. J. Porfirio, and first published in 2021 by Van Ryder Games. The player plays as a Final Girl being hunted by a Killer as she travels around a game board, searching for items and saving Victims until either she can eliminate the Killer or be killed herself. The game is sold modularly so that Killers, Final Girls, locations, and mechanics can be swapped in and out with the core game rules.

== Publishing history ==
Final Girl is designed by Evan Derrick and A. J. Porfirio and published by Van Ryder Games, with a one-player gameplay system based on that of Hostage Negotiator, a 2015 board game designed by Porfirio. The game has two parts sold separately: a Core Box with rules and components, and a chosen Feature Film Box with the scenario to be played. Scenarios are sold as expansions and are released in series; as of July 2025, there are three series of 5–6 expansions released for a total of 16 scenarios. Scenarios are often set in a common horror location or reference a horror franchise, including Alien, The Thing, and The Strangers. Each series of Final Girl expansions was successfully funded by a Kickstarter, with Series 1 beginning distribution in May 2021, Series 2 in December 2022, and Series 3 in October 2024. The newest expansion, Final Girl: Bad Times at Buddyland, is set to release in mid 2025.

== Gameplay ==
Final Girl is played on three game boards: the Player Board (where the Final girl's health, Horror Level, Time, and items are tracked), the Killer Board (where the Killer's health, Bloodlust, and abilities are tracked), and the Location Board (where movements of the Final Girl, Killer, and Victims are tracked). If the Horror Level ever reaches one end of the track, the Final Girl receives either a bonus or penalty.

On their turn, the player may continuously play as many Action cards until they run out of cards or Time, making Horror Rolls to determine the effectiveness (success, partial success, or failure) of each one. Action cards may allow the Final Girl to move, attack the Killer, heal, or search a designated location for items. If a player lands on a space with any Victims, they may choose to have up to two follow them, though the Victims will not follow onto a space with a Killer. Victims will escape if the Final Girl brings them to an exit, and the Final Girl receives a benefit for each one that does so; if enough victims are saved, the player gains a positive passive ability. Cards can also be discarded to gain Time. After playing Action cards, the player may spend Time to buy new Action cards from the Action Tableau. Once finished, Time is reset to six seconds and any played Action cards are put in the Action Tableau for the next round. After the Final Girl's turn, the player resolves the Killer's action and draws a Terror card, indicating who the Killer will target and any movement or attack actions. An attacked Victim dies and the Killer's Bloodlust increases, and an attacked Final Girl will lose health equal to the Killer's Attack Value unless they can defend with a Reaction card from their hand. If the Killer's Bloodlust reaches a certain level of the track, their Dark Power card is revealed and the Killer gains a new ability. After the Killer acts, Victims will panic if the Killer is close by or if a Victim was killed during the round, and will move spaces according to a dice roll in the direction listed on the board.

If no Terror cards remain, the Finale and Dark Power cards are revealed if not already, and the Killer gains additional abilities. The game ends when either the Final Girl or Killer runs out of health, and the player wins if the Killer is killed, even if the Final Girl also died.

== Reception ==
Wirecutter listed Final Girl as one of their "Best Board Games" of 2025, with James Austin describing it as an "experience that’s equal parts assertive moves and desperate Hail Mary attempts," and praising its "tricky gameplay" and "gorgeously produced" art. In an article for Polygon, Ryan Miller, co-designer of Disney Lorcana, listed Final Girl: Starter Set as his favourite game of 2024, describing the gameplay as "absolutely brutal" and concluding that "this may be a solo board game, but its narrative and mechanics worked together to keep me totally on edge for nearly the entire game." Tim Ford, writing for Dicebreaker, called the game one of the "best solo board games," but noted that though the method of releasing feature box series means a lot of possibilities, it can also be a very expensive game if one is looking for variety.

In an article for Player Elimination, Charlie Theel criticized the game for its repetitive gameplay, lack of variation in central play between editions, and reliance chance mechanics that can create an "exceedingly tiresome" gameplay of "cascading failure" if one fails to manage the horror track. He also noted that the main gameplay loop of playing and buying cards "chokes the life out of the game, overshadows the somewhat abstract narrative, and becomes the very identity of play," but praised the game's box–which is modular and breaks down into the game's boards–as a "a brilliant piece of engineering."
