= Tom Vasel =

American podcaster, designer, and board games reviewer

- Occupations: Podcaster; board game reviewer; game designer
- Years active: 2002–present
- Known for: Founder and host of The Dice Tower
- Notable work: The Dice Tower podcast and YouTube channel
- Children: 8

Tom Vasel, born ca. 1976, is a podcaster, designer and reviewer of board games, and hosted The Dice Tower podcast from 2003-2022, which has more than 300,000 subscribers. Vasel began publishing board game reviews in 2002 on BoardGameGeek, followed by YouTube, and his Dice Tower website. As of 2021, he has rated over 7000 games and expansions. His first board game review was for The Settlers of Canaan.

Vasel was the designer of the board game Vicious Fishes in 2010, and co-designer for the boardgame Nothing Personal in 2013.

Tom and his wife Laura have had 8 children together, 6 girls and 2 boys. One of his children, Jack Vasel, died in 2011, resulting in Vasel establishing the Jack Vasel Memorial Fund, a not-for-profit fund with the goal of raising and distributing funds to help gamers in their hour of need.
