= 2015 in games =

This page lists board and card games, wargames, miniatures games, and tabletop role-playing games published in 2015. For video games, see 2015 in video gaming.

== Games released or invented in 2015 ==
- Blood Rage
- Codenames
- The Contender: The Game of Presidential Debate
- Deception
- Exploding Kittens
- The Gallerist
- Karuba
- Kingdom Death: Monster
- Mombasa
- Mysterium
- The Ninth Age: Fantasy Battles
- The Voyages of Marco Polo
- Warhammer Age of Sigmar
- XCOM

== Game awards given in 2015 ==
- La Granja won the Spiel Portugal Jogo do Ano.

== Significant game-related events in 2015 ==
Plaid Hat Games was acquired by Canadian board game publishing company F2Z Entertainment.

== Deaths ==
Date	Name	Age	Notability
January 7	Cabu	76	Cartoonist who also did artwork for games
January 7	Georges Wolinski	80	Cartoonist who also did artwork for games
January 7	Tignous	57	Cartoonist who also did artwork for games
January 12	John Hill	69	Game designer of miniatures wargames
February 16	Brett Ewins	59	Illustrator on The Judge Dredd Roleplaying Game
February 25	Victor Watson	86	Chairman of Waddingtons
April 23	Francis Tsai	48	Illustrator for Big Eyes, Small Mouth, Magic: The Gathering, and Dungeons & Dragons
May 11	Glen Orbik	51	Illustrator for Dungeons & Dragons
October 24	Will McLean	58	Illustrator for Dungeons & Dragons

== See also ==
- List of game manufacturers
- 2015 in video gaming
