= 2015 Origins Award winners =

The following are the winners of the 42nd annual (2015) Origins Award, presented at Origins 2016:

Category	Winner	Company	Designer(s)
Game of the Year	Codenames	Czech Games Edition	Vlaada Chvátil
Best Board Game	Star Wars: Imperial Assault	Fantasy Flight Games	Justin Kemppainen, Corey Konieczka, Jonathan Ying
Best Card Game	7 Wonders Duel	Repos Productions	Antoine Bauza, Bruno Cathala
Best Family Game	Codenames	Czech Games Edition	Vlaada Chvátil
Best Miniatures Game	Star Wars: Armada	Fantasy Flight Games	James Kniffen, Christian T. Petersen
Best Collectible Game	DC Comics Dice Masters: War of Light	WizKids	Mike Elliott, Eric M. Lang
Best Role-Playing Game	Star Wars: Force and Destiny	Fantasy Flight Games	Jay Little
Best Game Accessory	Terrain Tiles	Lost Battalion Games	Becky Siebe

== Fan Favorites ==
Category	Winner	Company	Designer(s)
Fan Favorite Board Game	Star Wars: Imperial Assault	Fantasy Flight Games	Justin Kemppainen, Corey Konieczka, Jonathan Ying
Fan Favorite Card Game	7 Wonders Duel	Repos Productions	Antoine Bauza, Bruno Cathala
Fan Favorite Family Game	Codenames	Czech Games Edition	Vlaada Chvátil
Fan Favorite Miniatures Game	Star Wars: Armada	Fantasy Flight Games	James Kniffen, Christian T. Petersen
Fan Favorite Collectible Game	DC Comics Dice Masters: War of Light	WizKids	Mike Elliott, Eric M. Lang
Fan Favorite Role-Playing Game	Star Wars: Force and Destiny	Fantasy Flight Games	Jay Little
Fan Favorite Game Accessory	Castle Panic: The Dark Titan	Fireside Games	Justin De Witt
