= Dungeon Lords =

Dungeon Lords may refer to:

- Dungeon Lords (board game), a 2009 euro-style game
- Dungeon Lords (video game), a 2005 game from DreamCatcher Interactive and Typhoon Games
