= Heavy Stereo =

English rock band (1993–1999)

- Origin: Durham, England Redcar, England
- Genres: Alternative rock; Britpop; hard rock; post-punk; indie rock; glam rock
- Years active: 1993–1999
- Label: Creation
- Past members: Gem Archer; Craig "Nez" Naisbitt; Pete Downing; Nick Jones

Heavy Stereo were an English alternative rock band, who were active from 1993 to 1999. There were known for their 1970s glam rock styled sound, and their sole album, Déjà Voodoo. They were also on the same record label and opened for Oasis, which Heavy Stereo's frontman Gem Archer later joined.

== Career ==
Heavy Stereo was formed in 1993 by lead guitarist Pete Downing and bassist Nez (both ex-2 Lost Sons) and fronted by ex-Contenders lead vocalist, rhythm guitarist, songwriter and producer Gem Archer, later of Oasis. They were heavily influenced by 1970s glam rock, including T. Rex (band), The New York Dolls, and Sweet. They released their debut and only album, Deja Voodoo, in 1996. Heavy Stereo also produced a cover of The Jam's song The Gift, for the tribute album Fire & Skill. The band split up after Archer joined Oasis as a rhythm guitarist and keyboardist, replacing Paul "Bonehead" Arthurs for their Standing on the Shoulder of Giants Tour, and on all albums and tours afterwards until their breakup in 2009. Archer then began work on a new project with other members of Oasis, called Beady Eye, before joining Noel Gallagher's High Flying Birds.

== Band members ==
- Gem Archer – lead vocals, rhythm guitar, piano
- Craig "Nez" Naisbitt – bass
- Pete Downing – lead guitar
- Nick Jones – drums, vocals, percussion

== Discography ==
=== Albums ===
- Déjà Voodoo (2 September 1996) – Charted at number 76 in the UK Albums Chart. All songs written by Gem Archer, and produced by Heavy Stereo, John Bell and Steve Orchard.
1. "Chinese Burn"
2. "Cartoon Moon"
3. "Déjà Voodoo"
4. "Tell Yer Ma"
5. "Crown of Thoughts"
6. "Mouse in a Hole"
7. "Bangers and Mash"
8. "Deep Fried Heart"
9. "Reaching for Heaven"
10. "Keep Up"
11. "Planet Empty"
12. "Shooting Star"

=== Chart singles ===
- "Sleep Freak" (1995) – UK No. 46
- "Smiler" (1995) – UK No. 46
- "Chinese Burn" (1996) – UK No. 45
- "Mouse in a Hole" (1996) – UK No. 53

== See also ==
- Fire & Skill: The Songs of the Jam
