= SETI: Search for Extraterrestrial Intelligence =

2024 science fiction board game

- Box cover
- Designers: Tomáš Holek
- Illustrators: Ondřej Hrdina; Oto Kandera; Jiří Kůs; Jakub Lang; Michaela Lovecká; Jiří Mikovec; Jakub Politzer; Petra Ramešová; František Sedláček; Petr Štich; Josef Surý
- Publishers: Czech Games Edition
- Publication: 2024; 2 years ago
- Genres: Science fiction
- Players: 1–4
- Playing time: 40–160 minutes
- Age range: 14+

SETI: Search for Extraterrestrial Intelligence is a science fiction board game designed by Tomáš Holek and published by Czech Games Edition in 2024. Players play as space exploration agency searching extraterrestrial life by scanning nearby space, analyzing collected data, and launching and landing exploratory probes on other planets or moons.

== Publishing history ==
SETI, designed by Tomáš Holek, was announced in early 2024 and published in late 2024 by Czech Games Edition. On April 30, 2025, Czech Games Edition announced an expansion, SETI: Space Agencies, to debut at the October 2025 SPIEL and release for retail later in 2025.

== Gameplay ==
SETI is played on a game board representing the solar system with rotatable planet pieces that shift throughout the game, representing the orbiting of astronomical bodies around the sun. To set up, the game board is set to a random orientation, two random discoverable alien species cards are placed face down in the play space, and each player receives a player board to track their unlocked technology and actions, some currency, and five cards.

The game is played over the course of five rounds comprising multiple turns, with players taking one main action–scanning nearby stars, analyzing collected data, researching technology upgrades, playing a card, or launching, orbiting, or landing a probe–and any free actions–spending energy to move a probe, completing missions, exchanging resources, moving data, buying cards, or completing free actions listed on a card they discard–they wish on their turn. Many actions also require a currency cost to complete. A round is completed when all players choose to pass on their turn. Players can launch probes, and move them through the solar system until they encounter a planet to either orbit or land on and collect data from. They may also scan space sectors from Earth to collect data, and receive rewards depending on the amount they contributed when a sector has been completely scanned. Data collected can be moved to a computer and analyzed in order to find traces of extraterrestrial life. If a player discovers enough alien traces by scanning, landing on planets, or analyzing data, then the corresponding alien board and unlock new cards and opportunities to score points. Players can also play cards based on real space projects, such as the Herschel Space Observatory and Mariner 10, which allow actions to be performed a reduced cost or with a bonus, or score victory points.

Players receive victory points for many different actions including playing some cards, completing missions, being the orbiting or landing on a planet, marking signals in space sectors, moving data, and researching technology, and the player with the most victory points at the end of the game is the winner.

== Reception ==
Polygon included SETI in their list of the best board games of 2024, with Charlie Theel describing it as "a contemplative game with layered strategy and sophisticated card play." Chris Marling, writing for Tabletop Gaming, noted that the game can run long with more than two players and that "the game can also feel too generous," but concluded that "SETI is a complex euro with a well-implemented theme and satisfying game arc, making it a must despite any length and ‘analysis paralysis’ concerns." In an article for GamesRadar+, Samantha Nelson rated the game 4/5 stars, praising its strategic gameplay, solo mode, and simulation of real-life SETI practices, but criticizing the playing length.

The game was nominated for the Heavy Strategy Board Game Award in the 2024 Origin Awards.
