= Contender =

Contender may refer to:

== Boats ==
- Contender (dinghy), type of sailing dinghy
- Columbia 24 Contender, an American sailboat design

== Books ==
- The Contender (Lipsyte novel), a 1967 novel by Robert Lipsyte
- The Contenders, a 2008 guide to the American presidential election with contributions by Laura Flanders and Dan Savage
- The Gemini Contenders, a 1976 novel by Robert Ludlum

== Films ==
- The Contender (1944 film), a film directed by Sam Newfield
- The Contender (1993 film), a TV movie directed by Lou Antonio
- The Contender (2000 film), a film starring Gary Oldman, Joan Allen, and Jeff Bridges
- Series 7: The Contenders, a 2001 film directed by Daniel Minahan

== Firearms ==
- Thompson/Center Contender, single shot, break-action firearm made as a pistol or rifle, manufactured by Thompson Center Arms

== Television ==
- The Contender (TV series), a 2005 boxing-based reality television series or its spinoffs
- The Contenders, a 2011 C-SPAN series about influential American presidential nominees
- The Contenders, a 2004 Australian television program presented by Liz Jackson
- Contender Entertainment Group, currently known as Entertainment One UK

== Music ==
- Contenders, a 1986 album by Easterhouse
- The Contenders (band), and their self-titled 1989 debut album
- The Contender, a 1998 album by Royal Crown Revue
- Contenders, a 1999 album by Valdy
- Contender (album), a 2012 album by American pop punk band Forever Came Calling

=== Songs ===
- "The Contender", a song by Menahan Street Band on the 2008 album Make the Road by Walking
- "Contender", a song by The Pains of Being Pure at Heart on their 2009 self-titled album The Pains of Being Pure at Heart
- "Contenders" (song), a song by Heaven 17
- "The Contender", by Irish songwriter Jimmy MacCarthy about Irish boxer Jack Doyle
- "The Contenders", a song by The Kinks on their 1970 album Lola Versus Powerman and the Moneygoround, Part One

== Plants ==
- A variety of green beans

== Games ==
- The Contender: The Game of Presidential Debate, a political debate-themed party game using cards.

== See also ==
- Contend
- Contenda
