= The Gallerist =

The Gallerist may refer to:

- The Gallerist (board game), a worker placement game
- The Gallerist (film), a 2026 comedy thriller film by Cathy Yan
