= Space Alert =

2008 board game

- Box cover
- Designers: Vlaada Chvátil
- Publishers: Czech Games Edition; Heidelberger Spieleverlag; Quined White Goblin Games; Red Glove; Rio Grande Games
- Players: 1 to 5
- Playing time: 30 minutes
- Age range: 12 and up

Space Alert is a cooperative survival designer board game created by Vlaada Chvátil in 2008. Players assume the roles of space explorers on a mission to survey the galaxy. The crew is evaluated on teamwork and how they deal with problems that arise on their journey. Unlike most board games, in Space Alert, players need to make decisions and play cards in real time. It was given a special prize for "New Game Worlds" in the 2009 Spiel des Jahres awards.

== Gameplay ==
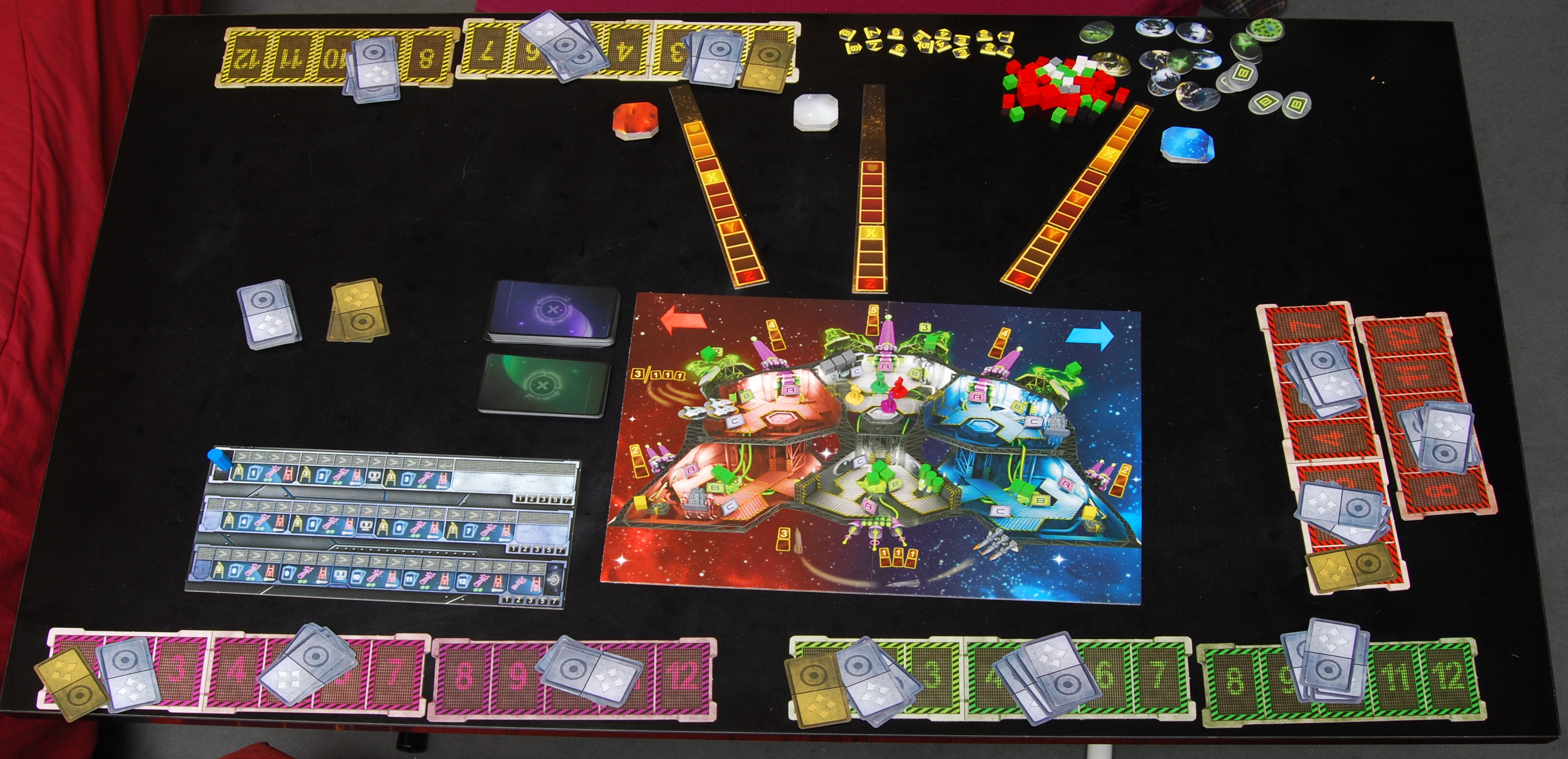
Game Board and Components.

The game is separated into two rounds, the action round and the resolution round. The action round consists of 10 minutes of gameplay. During this round, the computer announces threats that appear, and the players play cards which allow them to take actions in response to the threats. Each card allows the player to move around the ship, or to take actions (such as firing a laser, supplying energy to a reactor, etc.). After the action round, players complete the resolution round, during which they resolve their actions and determine whether or not they survived the threats. They then calculate their points based on the number of threats handled and the amount of damage their ship sustained.

=== Roles ===
The crew consists of a captain, a chief of security, a communications officer and two general space cadets. The captain is responsible for announcing the progression of the turns. The chief of security announces internal threats, while the communication officer announces external threats. The general space cadets have no specific role.

=== Computer announcements ===
The action round progression follows an audio track, included in the game components, that narrates the different events in each phase. These events include enemy activity, incoming data, data transfers, and the end of each phase. Incoming data allows players to draw cards. Data transfers allow players to exchange cards. Enemy activity details the external and internal threats.

=== Threats ===
There are two types of threats: external and internal. External threats spawn outside the ship and are usually dealt with by shooting lasers or missiles. Internal threats spawn inside the ship. All threats are categorized as serious or common threats. Serious threats, if not dealt with, usually end in a substantial amount of damage.

== Space Alert: the New Frontier Expansion ==

Space Alert: the New Frontier is an expansion pack for Space Alert released in 2010. The expansion adds to many different aspects of the game. There are new threats, (including more difficult "red" threats,) a new "double actions" game mode, player specializations and an experience system. These additions can all be used simultaneously or players can pick and choose which additions they would like to play with for a given mission.

== Appearance in popculture ==
Space Alert box appears in The Big Bang Theory in episode 11x10 ("The Confidence Erosion"), visible behind Stuart in the Comic Center shop.

== Awards ==
- 2009 Spiel des Jahres New Worlds Game
- 2009 Golden Geek Award Best Innovative Board Game
- 2009 JoTa Highlight of the Year
- 2008 Dice Tower Gaming Awards Most Innovative Game
