= Galaxy Trucker =

Science-fiction board game

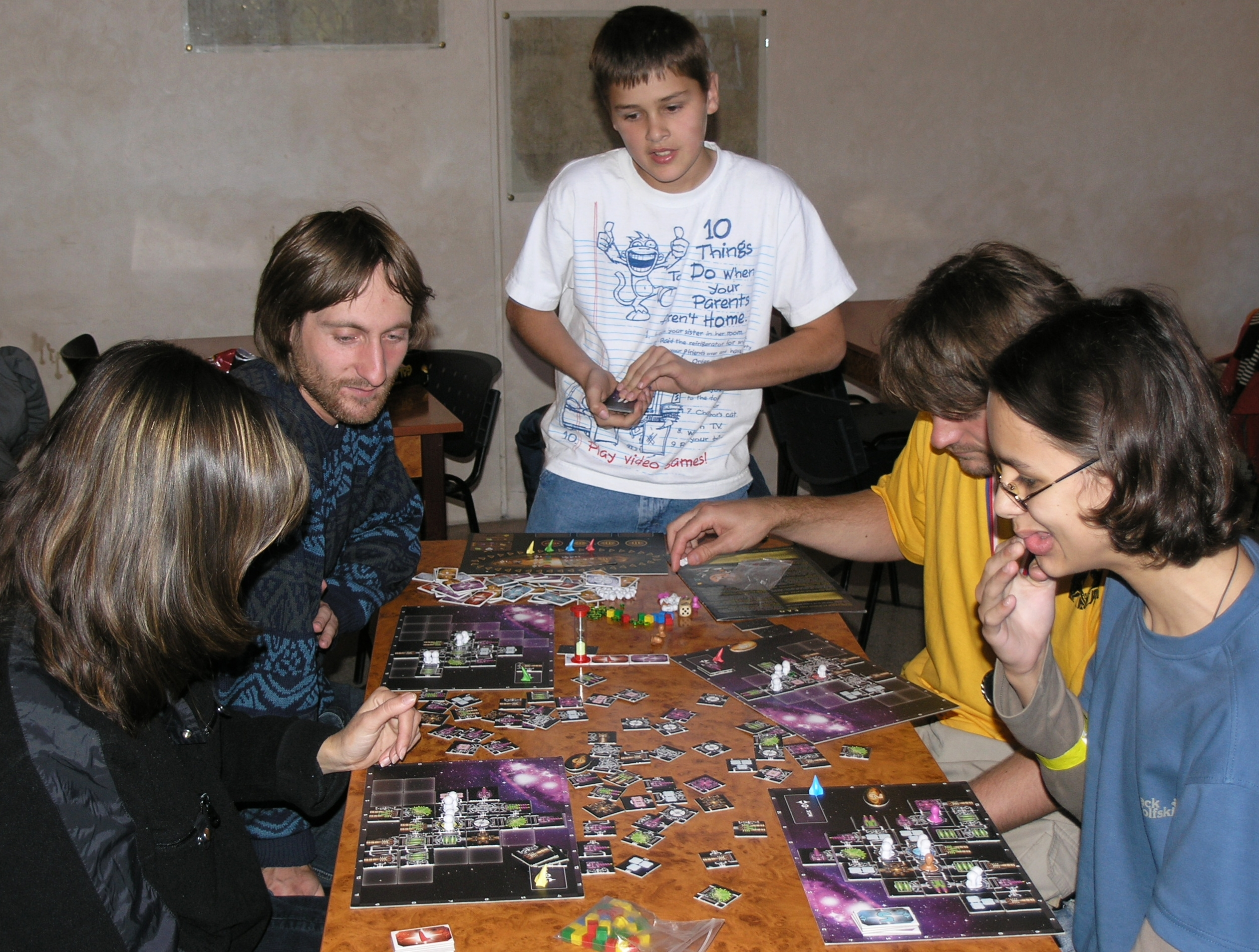
- Designers: Vlaada Chvatil
- Illustrators: Radim Pech
- Publishers: Heidelberger Spieleverlag
- Genres: Board game
- Players: 2 to 4 (5 with expansion)
- Playing time: 30 minutes
- Age range: 8 years and up

Galaxy Trucker is a science fiction board game for two to four players. It was developed by Vlaada Chvátil, with graphics designed by Radim Pech. The Czech version of Galaxy Trucker was released in 2007 by Czech Games Edition, and a German version was published in the same year by Heidelberger Spieleverlag. In 2021, a revised edition of the game was released.

Vlaada Chvátil developed the video game version of Galaxy Trucker in 2014. It was first released on October 7, 2014, for iPad, the 24th of December 2014 for iPhone and Android, and the 14th of April 2015 for Windows Phone.

== Plot ==
Galaxy Corporation Incorporated is a construction firm that builds sewer systems and low-income houses on underdeveloped planets. Galaxy Corporation Incorporated is on the verge of bankruptcy, which has resulted in the company transporting building materials to the edge of the Galaxy, where the need for their services is highest. Galaxy Corporation Incorporated was saved by a few individuals who decided not to ship the materials to the edge of the Galaxy and instead build the materials into spacecraft and ship themselves. The players now must sign a contract and then gain access to Galaxy Corporation Incorporated Warehouse. The players can build their own spacecraft from the available prefabricated materials and fly to the Periphery (edge of the Galaxy). The players may lose money, but any gains made are theirs to keep, and Galaxy Corporation Incorporated will pay a bonus for quick delivery. It's possible that the player will end up with an immense amount of debt and beg for money on the street or they may find themselves among the 10 billion richest people in the Galaxy.

== Gameplay ==
Galaxy Trucker features two phases—shipbuilding and Space Travel. The player builds their ship from junk to prepare for their trip. Players build the ship in real-time, with an option for a turn-based mode similar to the original game. The second phase of the game is the trip. A player gains a higher score by getting to the destination before their rivals, or by getting the most valuable goods.

Galaxy Trucker is played in three (or up to four with expansions) rounds, with later rounds having bigger ships that increase travel difficulty. Each round consists of three phases: building, space travel, and settlement. Before every round, four decks of cards are prepared. The main phase of Galaxy Trucker is during the construction phase, which has players building ships. In the beginning, all tiles are face down and all players pick and build simultaneously. Time restrictions via hourglasses keep players under pressure. However, faster players can limit the time available. A player who builds at least one tile can pick from the public deck to view the dangers ahead.

All decks are shuffled together and played one by one by the starting player. Cards contain both positive and negative effects (meteor showers, planets with goods, battle zones, slavers, or pirates) that can bring money and goods, remove ship pieces (that must be repaired), or even force a player to return home.

After the flight, players receive bonuses for the fastest delivery or the nicest ship and can sell obtained goods. Players also have to pay for any lost tiles.

== Other versions ==
=== Missions (2015) ===
Missions is a minor expansion based on missions introduced by the digital versions. The expansion contains mission cards and special tiles (like radioactive cargo and metal ingots).

=== Galaxy Trucker (2014) ===
An iPad version of Galaxy Trucker was released in October 2014, with releases for iPhone and Android following in December 2014. A version for Windows Phone was released the following year in April 2015. Galaxy Trucker offers a story-based campaign, a solo game, and multiplayer. The expansion Alien Technologies was released in August 2016 with Galaxy Trucker adding more features such as new tiles, a new species, and a new game mode.

== Reception ==
Galaxy Trucker has received very positive reviews, with an 87% on Metacritic. Galaxy Trucker has also gained awards, including the best Czech video game of the year by Games.cz and Readers' Choice by BoardGameGeek.

== Awards & nominations ==
- 2008 Golden Geek Best Board Game Artwork/Presentation Nominee
- 2008 Golden Geek Best Family Board Game Nominee
- 2008 Golden Geek Best Gamer's Board Game Nominee
- 2008 Golden Geek Best Party Board Game Nominee
- 2008 Hra Roku Nominee
- 2008 Spiel der Spiele Hit Mit Freunde Recommended
- 2008 Spiel des Jahres Recommended
- 2009 Japan Boardgame Prize Voters' Selection Nominee
- 2009 Lys Passioné Finalist
- 2012 Ludoteca Ideale Winner
