= Marie Cardouat =

French illustrator (born 1981)

- Born: 7 August 1981 (age 44); Finistère, France
- Occupation: illustrator
- Years active: 2006–present
- Notable work: Dixit

Marie Cardouat (born 7 August 1981) is a French illustrator, best known for illustrating the original image card deck of the game Dixit.

== Early life and education ==
Cardouat was born in 1981 in Finistère. She attended the School of Decorative Arts in Strasbourg, and set up a small studio near Paris upon her graduation in 2006.

== Career ==
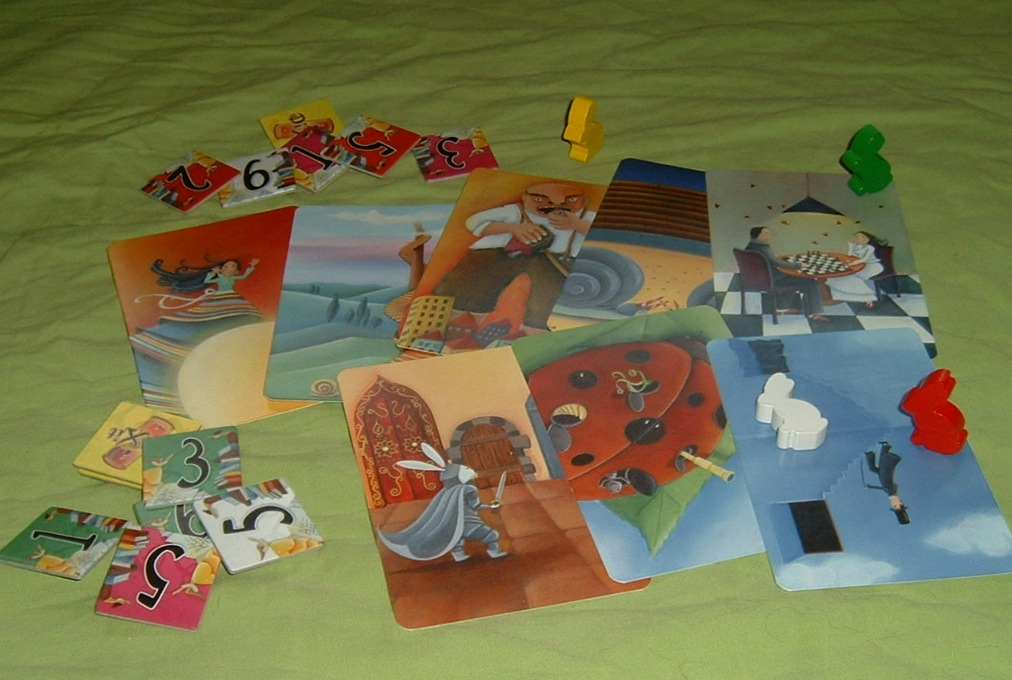
Image cards from the original game Dixit, illustrated by Cardouat

Cardouat began illustrating for Editions des Correspondances, a stationery company publishing greeting cards and postcards. Having heard that Régis Bonnessée of Libellud was seeking an illustrator, she submitted a portfolio and won the commission to illustrate the cards for Dixit (2008). Since then, she has continued to illustrate games, including Marrakech (2010), Au Pays Des Papas (2010), Steam Park (2013), Abracada...What? (2014), ...and then, we held hands (2015), and HOP! (2016), which she co-designed with Ludovic Maublanc. A recent game featuring her illustrations is 1001 Islands (2022), originally published as The Little Prince: Make Me a Planet (2013).
