= Vlaada Chvátil =

Czech board game and video game designer

Vladimír Chvátil
- Born: 14 September 1971 (age 54); Jihlava, Czechoslovakia (now Czech Republic)
- Known for: Board game designer Video game designer

Vladimír Chvátil [ˈvlaɟɪmiːr ˈxvaːcɪl] (born 1971), often known professionally as Vlaada Chvátil [ˈvlaːda ˈxvaːcɪl], is a Czech board game and video game designer. He became a recognizable name in the board game community following the publication of Through the Ages: A Story of Civilization in 2006 and thereafter his designs frequently made the top 100 list on BoardGameGeek. In 2016, he won the coveted "Spiel des Jahres" (Game of the Year) award for Codenames. In 2019, he entered the Origins Award Hall of Fame.

His most notable video game project was a real-time strategy Original War. He later worked on the role-playing video game Vision that has never been finished. In 2006, he left Altar and started to focus on board games. In 2010 he worked on Family Farm, a game that was developed by Hammerware.

== Style ==
Vlaada's designs are strongly rooted in the game's theme preferring the mechanics that fit the theme best. His attachment to the theme is also evident in the way he writes the rules for his games which always make the theme apparent and sometimes even uses the theme to inject humor into the process of learning a game.

He also gained a reputation for innovative mechanics and a diverse range of designs, including the epic civilization game Through the Ages, the award-winning party word game Codenames, and the real time sci-fi adventure Galaxy Trucker which required the players to simultaneously rummage through a pile of cardboard tiles looking for ones to improve their spaceship.

== Notable games ==
=== Video games ===
- 1992: Cervii
- 1997: Fish Fillets NG
- 2001: Original War
- 2007: Fish Fillets 2
- 2010: Family Farm
- 2014: Galaxy Trucker
- 2017: Through the Ages
- 2022: Codenames

=== Board Games ===
- 1997: Arena: Morituri te salutant
- 2002: Prophecy
- 2005: Merry Men of Sherwood
- 2006: Graenaland
- 2006: Through the Ages: A Story of Civilization winner of 2007 International Gamers Awards – General Strategy; Multi-player
- 2007: Kámen – Zbraně – Papír (Rock – Paper – Weapons)
- 2007: Galaxy Trucker recommended at 2008 Spiel des Jahres
- 2008: Space Alert winner of 2009 Spiel des Jahres "New Worlds Game"
- 2008: Sacculus (a card game for Junák – Czech scouting organization)
- 2009: Dungeon Lords
- 2009: Bunny Bunny Moose Moose
- 2010: Sneaks & Snitches
- 2010: Travel Blog
- 2011: Dungeon Petz
- 2011: Mage Knight Board Game
- 2011: Pictomania
- 2013: Tash-Kalar: Arena of Legends
- 2015: Codenames
- 2016: Star Trek: Frontiers (not directly involved in the project but serving in an advisory role, based on the same system from Mage Knight Board Game)
- 2017: That's a Question!
- 2021: Galaxy Trucker new edition of existing game
