= Castle Panic =

2009 strategy board game

- Designers: Justin De Witt
- Publishers: Fireside Games
- Publication: 2009
- Genres: Strategy board game
- Players: 1–6
- Setup time: 10 minutes
- Playing time: 60 minutes
- Skills: Strategy

Castle Panic is a board game designed by Justin De Witt and published by Fireside Games in 2009 Castle Panic is a tower defense strategy game in which players work cooperatively to protect a castle from monsters. The game was a nominee for the 2010 Golden Geek Best Family Board Game.

== Gameplay ==
The game is set up in a circle. The circle is divided into six arcs of four rings each. Each arc is assigned one of three colors; blue, red or green. Each ring of the circle is subdivided and labeled either forest, the outermost ring, moving inward with, archer, knight, and swordsman rings respectively. The objective of the game is to kill the monsters invading from the forest before they can destroy your castle. Each player has their turn in order trading, attacking, and potentially repairing their castle. After the players turns, monsters are added and move toward the castle. If they have already reached the edge of the walls or towers of the castles they will attack the obstacle in front of them. If all the towers are destroyed the monsters win and the players lose. Monsters are defeated by using cards from the current players hand to attack them. Each card attacks in its colored area and class location, e.g. a blue archer can only attack in the blue archer space. The exception to this rule is the hero who can attack in any ring of their color.

Each turn consists of six steps

1. Draw cards up to the hand limit.
2. Discard and then draw a new card (optional). This is useful to remove cards that aren't helpful to the player.
3. Trade cards with other players (optional). This allows you to get the cards you need to survive while giving players cards they will also want or need.
4. Play as many cards as you want. This of course is used to defeat monsters and protect your castle.
5. Move monsters into the next closest ring.
6. Draw two new monster tokens and add them to the board. Their position is determined by a roll of the dice.

== Awards and accolades ==
- ToysBulletin.com's Best of the year 2014
- Castle Panic was nominated for an Origins Award.
- Castle Panic: The Dark Titan by Justin De Witt won the 2016 Origins Fan Favorite Award for Best Game Accessory.

== Expansions ==
Castle Panic: The Wizard's Tower released in 2011. This expansion adds many new things. These include a new wizard's tower with a wizard card deck which includes new spells to attack monsters and defend and rebuild the walls and towers. There are also new monsters, bosses, game modes and fire to add more challenge to the original game.

Castle Panic: The Dark Titan released in 2015. This expansion adds a new boss monster, Agranok, along with more powerful enemies. Players now have a cavalier, boiling oil, and barrage to help combat the new threats.

Castle Panic: Engines of War was released in November 2016. This expansion gives the enemies encampments and siege engines, but provides the players with ballistas, catapults, and an engineer who can build pits, traps, and barricades on the battlefield.

It has been revealed on Fireside Games Instagram that there will be a fourth expansion to the game with an unknown release date

== Promotion items ==
Promotion items have been released each year in connection with Gaming Conventions.

- Feather Promo Bookmark - given away and 2011 Gen Con and Origins Game Fair. It slays one tarred monster.
- Crossbow Promo Coaster - released in 2012. It allows knights and swordsman to hit a flying monster (from Wizard's Tower expansion).
- Any Color Hero Promo Card - released in 2013. Shuffled into the castle deck, can hit one monster in any color of the Archer, Knight or Swordsman rings.
- Agranok Level 6 Promo Card - Released in 2015, it is an additional level card for Agranok (from Dark Titan expansion).
- Tower Promo (2015) - Set up in place of a standard tower, a monster attacking this tower is hit for 2 points instead of 1.
- Tower Promo (2016) - Set up in place of a standard tower, this tower can be rebuilt by returning 3 slain trolls to the Forest ring.
- Tower Promo (2017) - All players draw up and trade when this tower is destroyed.
- Tower Promo (2018) - Roll die. Damage that # of monsters 1 point.
- Tower Promo (2019) - Move all Monsters in this arc back to the Forest, when this tower is destroyed.
- Jury-Rig Promo Card - released in 2016, this card is shuffled into the resource deck of the Engines of War expansion and can be used to substitute for any resource.
- Fickle Fortune Promo Card - Shuffle this card into the player deck. On any player's turn, reroll the die and keep the second result.
- All for One Promo Card - Players discard a combined total of 5 cards to damage 1 Monster anywhere on the board for 1 point. (part of the 2018 Panic Day promo kit)

== Panic variations ==
- Released in 2014, Munchkin Panic is a combination between Munchkin and Castle Panic.
  - Munchkin Panic: Instant Gratification Promo allows a player to instantly add Treasures to his/her hand.
  - Munchkin Panic: Potion of Mwahahaha! Promo card allows a player to destroy a tower for 5 additional points.
- Released in 2016, War Thunder uses WWII themed enemies and player characters. Released by Hobby World in Russian only, with agreement of Fireside Games.
  - Released in 2018, War Thunder: Siege.Wunderwaffe by Hobby World as Russian version of The Wizard's Tower.
- Released in 2019, My First Castle Panic is a pre-school version of Castle Panic for ages 4+

=== Science-fiction themed variations ===
- Released in 2016, Star Trek Panic, uses Star Trek themed enemies and player characters, as players battle to complete missions before their Starship is destroyed.
  - Released in 2016, a promo card Star Trek Panic: Vulcan Mind Meld allows a player to use the special ability of another player.
- Released in 2013, Dead Panic is a variation to the game with similar gameplay against an army of zombies attacking your cabin.
  - Released in 2013, Dead Panic: Laser Sight Promo Card allows your rifle, pistol, or shotgun to do one more point of damage.
  - Released in 2014, the promo expansion Dead Panic: Bullet Bookmark was released to allow a player once per game to reload a weapon with one bullet.
