= Mysterium (board game) =

2015 board game

- Box cover
- Designers: Oleksandr Nevskiy; Oleg Sidorenko
- Illustrators: Igor Burlakov; Xavier Collette
- Publishers: Libellud
- Genres: Board game; Guessing game
- Players: 2–7
- Playing time: 42 minutes
- Age range: 10 and up
- Website: www.libellud.com/en/mysterium-universe/

Mysterium is a cooperative board game designed by Oleksandr Nevskiy and Oleg Sidorenko. It blends aspects of murder mystery games and card-based guessing games. One person plays as the ghost of a murdered individual who can communicate with the other players through a series of visions during a 7-hour seance in the form of illustrated cards. The other players, who take the role of psychic mediums participating in the seance, must interpret the art on the cards they individually receive to identify a suspect, location, and murder weapon of a committed crime. Following its release in 2015, Mysterium received positive reviews and has become a staple in its genre. It has since received two expansions Mysterium: Hidden Signs in 2016 and Mysterium: Secrets and Lies in 2017, which introduces a new card type to identify: the story card.

== Gameplay ==
Thirty years ago, a servant was murdered in his employer’s mansion during a party. A group of mediums organize a séance to solve the mystery. The ultimate goal of the ghost is to indicate who killed him, where, and with what weapon. A series of illustrated cards are laid out for each of three stages: one for suspects, one for locations, and one for murder weapons. One person plays as the ghost. This player may not directly communicate with the other players, who play the mediums; however, the mediums may collaborate. The ghost secretly selects a suspect, location, and murder weapon for each medium to guess. Each round, the ghost hands out one or more illustrated cards to each medium, which is its sole means of communication with the players. Mediums progress through the stages by correctly guessing their respective suspect, location, and murder weapon. Players may indicate whether they believe guesses to be correct or not through tokens. If all players have advanced past the third stage by round seven, the ghost gives a final clue as to which medium holds the true identity of the ghost's murderer. Depending on how quickly players advanced through the stages and how many correct tokens they have placed, they may see one, two, or three cards from the ghost. Players may not communicate during this final stage, and their final vote must be secret. If the majority guesses correctly, the players win and the ghost is set free to enjoy the afterlife.

== Publication ==
Mysterium was initially published as Містеріум in Ukraine. French publisher Libellud, after acquiring the English- and French-language rights, made several changes to the rules and art.

== Reception ==
Polygon identified it as one of the best games of Gen Con 2015. Nate Anderson of Ars Technica called it a "truly novel" combination of Dixit and Clue. Joshua Kosman of the San Francisco Chronicle rated it 5/5 stars and also compared it to Dixit and Clue. Matthew Baldwin of The Morning News compared it to Codenames, calling it more visual and complex. The game also won BoardGameGeek's 2015 Golden Geek Award for Best Artwork and Presentation.
