= Czech Games Edition =

Czech board and card game company

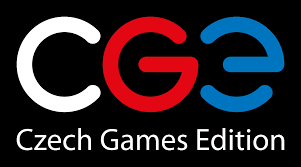
- Founded: 12 July 2007
- Headquarters: Prague
- Revenue: 373,104,000 Czech koruna (2020)
- Operating income: 88,702,000 Czech koruna (2020)
- Net income: 69,199,000 Czech koruna (2020)
- Total assets: 308,934,000 Czech koruna (2020)
- Number of employees: 28 (2020)

Czech Games Edition is a company established in 2007 in the Czech Republic that produces board and card games.

== Games ==
Board games produced by the company include Through the Ages: A New Story of Civilization, Galaxy Trucker, Space Alert, Lost Ruins of Arnak, and Codenames.

Digital app versions are also available of Galaxy Trucker, Codenames, and Through the Ages.
