= Fireside Games =

Board game

Fireside Games is a US based board game publishing company owned and operated by Justin De Witt and Anne-Marie De Witt. Based in Austin, Texas, the company was founded in 2007. They published their first game, Castle Panic in 2009, and have published several expansions and sequels as well as other titles since then.

== List of Games ==
Panic Games

- Castle Panic (2009) - A cooperative game played on a board of concentric rings with the castle in the center. Players cooperate as a team to repel the monsters as they methodically move from the outer ring toward the castle. Players use cards in their hand to attack monsters in a specific ring, rebuild walls, or other special effects before the monsters destroy the castle. After each player's turn the monsters move one ring closer to the castle and 2 new monsters are drawn and placed in the outer ring.
  - Castle Panic: Wizard's Tower (2011) - This game adds a wizard tower to replace one of the castle towers and a deck of wizard cards which players can draw from as long as the wizard tower still stands. The wizard cards have magical abilities to attack, destroy, move, or repel the monsters. New "flying" monsters are added to the mix, as well as monsters with other special abilities and vulnerabilities.
  - Castle Panic: The Dark Titan (2015) - Includes a new boss monster, Agranok, along with its heralds, and more monsters, but also includes support tokens, a cavalier, and castle cards to assist the players in defeating the monsters.
  - Castle Panic: Engines of War (2016) - This expansion adds a resource deck and an engineer tile so players can build barricades and other structures to slow down the monsters, or build a catapult or ballista to attack multiple monsters at once. New monsters appear with special abilities.
- Dead Panic (2013) - Players select role cards with special abilities and use weapons to destroy the zombies as the zombies slowly move toward the cabin. Players must assemble the radio and use it to contact the rescue van, in order to escape the zombies and win.
- Munchkin Panic (2014) - A semi-cooperative game where players attack and destroy the monsters approaching the castle, but there is a lot of backstabbing and betrayal like the game of Munchkin.
- Star Trek Panic (2016) - The Starship Enterprise sits in the center of the board where enemies approach from all directions. Players can rotate the starship and fire on enemies as they approach using the cards from their hands.
- My First Castle Panic (2019) - Children's version of Castle Panic. Players play cards to capture the monsters as they approach the castle along the path. Players must capture all of the monsters before they destroy the castle to win.

Other Games

- Bears! (2011) - A dice game with special 6 sided dice, each player takes 5 black player dice and places 5 white camp dice in the center. All the camp dice are rolled and show either a bear or a tent. Players then roll their player dice at the same time and race to pair up their guns with bears or runners or sleepers with tents. As soon as there are only one type of camp dice left (either bears or tents) players yell out "Bears!" and play stops. If bears are left in the middle, then players lose 2 points for each sleeper. If tents are left, then they gain 5 points per sleeper. In either situation players score 1 point per paired gun and 2 points for each paired runner. First player to 100 points wins.
  - Bears!: Trail Mix'd (2015) - Adds a special die which is rolled each round to activate a specific additional scoring rule for each round.
- Bloodsuckers (2011) - A card game for 2 to 4 players played in 2 teams as vampires against hunters. The board has five different locations. Each round a location is selected and the vampire team and hunter team play cards during a day/night cycle to win bystanders to determine which side wins the location. The winning side is the one who wins the most locations.
- Dastardly Dirigibles (2016) - A card game with 9 suits of 7 steampunk airship parts each, plus 12 special cards. Each turn players draw their hand up to 5 and play up to 3 actions which include playing an airship or special card from their hand to their board, discarding a card, switching 1 card from their hand with a card from the emporium, replacing the emporium, or passing. Airships are scored at the end of each round and after 3 rounds, the player with the most points wins.
- Grackles (2018) - a lightly themed abstract strategy game
- Here, Kitty Kitty! (2016) - A card game where players are trying to lure, steal, or otherwise collect cats to their yard, then porch, and finally inside their house. Each turn players have 2 actions where they can move a cat, play a card, or discard cards. After the last card is drawn, players get one more turn. Points are scored by the number and color of cats in your porch or house. The player with the most points wins.
- Hotshots (2017) - A cooperative game where players try to put out a forest fire.
- Kaiju Crush (2017) - Players select a kaiju monster and move around a modular board to claim territory and battle adjacent monsters to collect victory points. When no monsters can move anymore, the game ends and the player with the most victory points wins.
- Remnants (2018) - Remnants takes place in a post-apocalyptic world. Each player builds a compound and fights to survive Raiders and mutant creatures. Send Survivors into the Badlands to roll dice in a real-time race for Resources, and then take turns spending those Resources to buy weapon, defense, and special development cards. When threats attack, roll dice and use abilities from cards you purchased to stay alive and fend off the assault.
- Stringamajig (2020) - Players use a large string loop to draw images for other players to guess the words on cards to get points. Players get 1 or 2 points for drawing the correctly guessed word, or 1 point for guessing the word correctly drawn by another player. After 2 rounds, players add up their points to determine the winner.
- The Village Crone (2015) - Players are witches and move their token around a modular game board, collect resources, and play cards to cast spells to get points. The first player to 13 wins and becomes the village crone.
