= Through the Ages: A Story of Civilization =

2006 board game

Cover of the board game box

Through the Ages: A Story of Civilization is a board game for 2–4 players designed by Vlaada Chvatil and published by Czech Board Games in 2006. Its theme is the development of human civilization and the players determine the progress of their own civilization in different fields including culture, government, leadership, religion and science. The game won multiple awards including the International Gamers Awards in 2007 and Game of the Year in Poland in 2010, where it was published as Cywilizacja: Poprzez Wieki.

The game is about building a civilization, including urban buildings, governments, population, resource productions, military etc. By drawing and buying cards the players take their civilizations through 4 ages - beginning with classical antiquity and ending in the Modern Age. The game has spent over 5 years ranked in the top five board games at Board Game Geek.

In 2015 an updated version, entitled Through the Ages: A New Story of Civilization, was published with updated artwork and with a number of rule tweaks.

In 2017 an app version was announced and released on 14 September for Android, iPhone and iPad. This version was nominated for the A-Train Award for Best Mobile Game at the New York Game Awards 2018.

On March 26, 2018, a digital version of the game (similar to the app) was released on Steam.

== Description ==
Through the Ages is a civilization building game. Players take turns obtaining and spending resources to improve their civilization by increasing their population, building structures and developing their army while acquiring "civil cards" that allows them to also build wonders or appoint historical figures as their leaders, whose effects last until they are replaced with another leader or get obsolete, develop technologies to strengthen their assets or obtain extra resources. In the end of the turn, they also have the chance to obtain "military cards" that allows them in the beginning of their following turn to set historical events that can affect all players to be resolved later, colonize special territories, attack other civilizations to steal or destroy part of their resources or defend from such aggressions.

Victory is achieved by the player whose nation has accumulated the most "culture points" in the end of the game, which can be obtained in several different ways such as developing related buildings and wonders, using their leaders' special abilities or stealing them from other players using their military.

== Awards & Nominations ==
- 2007 International Gamers Awards - General Strategy
- 2017 Golden Geek Award – Best Board Game App – on BoardGameGeek
- 2017 Golden Geek Award – Best Mobile/Handheld – on BoardGameGeek
- 2010 Gra Roku Game of the Year
- Top Asynchronous Multiplayer Game: #2 by Pocket Tactics
- The Readers’ Top Game of 2017 by Stately Play
- Reader’s Choice Game of the Year 2017 by Pocket Tactics
- Card Game of the Year 2017 by Pocket Tactics
- Multiplayer Game of the Year 2017 by Pocket Tactics
- Игра года – Game of the Year 2017 – by iPadstory
- Game of the Year by Pixelated Cardboard
- Developer of the Year by Pixelated Cardboard

== Reception ==
Through the Ages has predominantly received positive reviews. Michael Weston from Opinionated Gamers described it as "near-perfection in every way", RPG.net have labeled the game as "One of the best modern games ever made" and Board Games Land have described it as "most refined and detailed civilization board game on the market".
