= Prophecy (board game) =

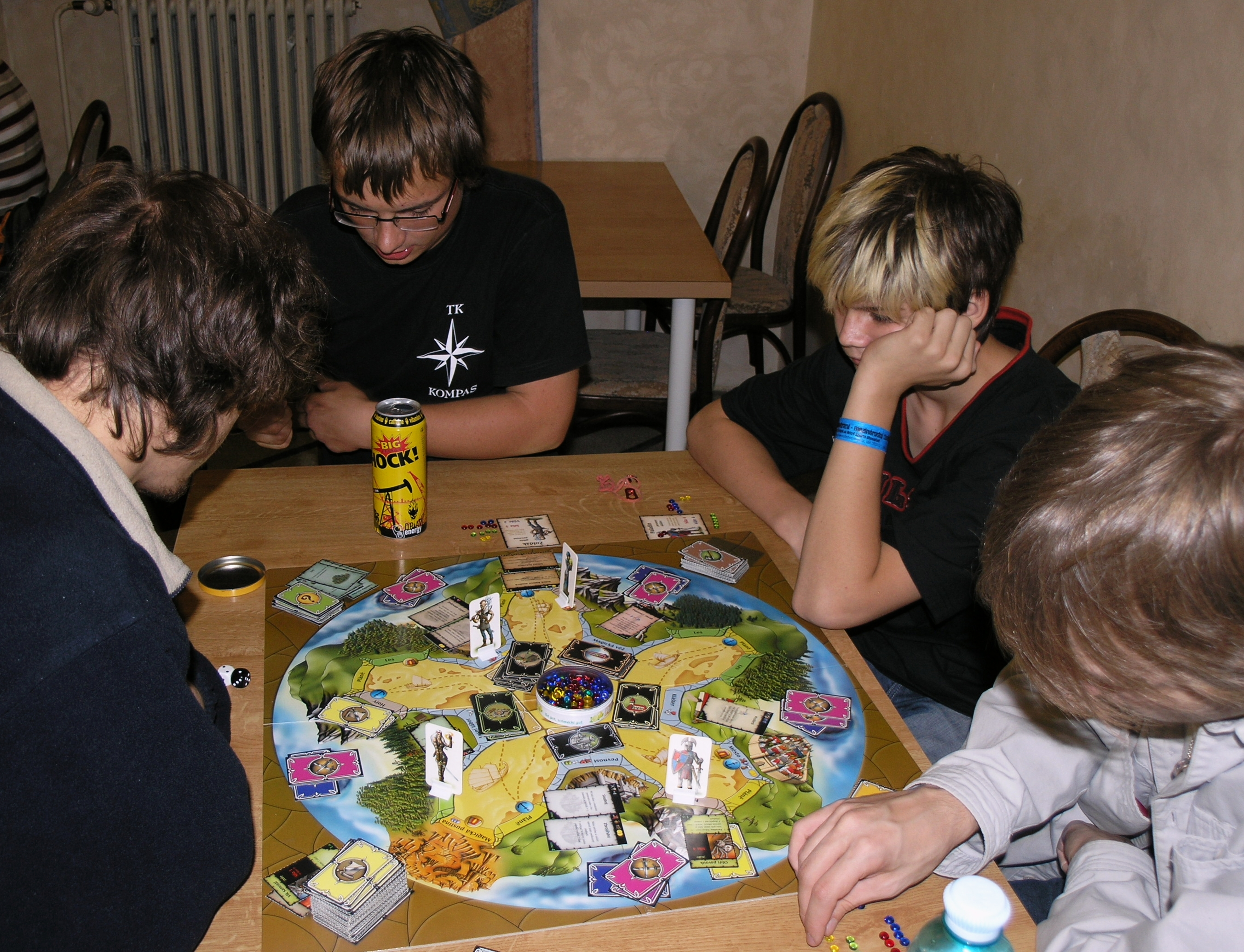
Proroctví

Proroctví (literally Prophecy) is a Czech fantasy board game published by Altar Games.

== Gameplay ==
The game is for 2 to 5 players and lasts 3 to 5 hours. Each player plays a mighty hero fighting with monsters and other enemies with weapons and magic and tries to build and strengthen his character. A player wins if he collects at least 4 out of 5 artefacts, which can be obtained by defeating very powerful monsters who guard them. Before a player dares to fight them, he must improve his character in some or all of the following aspects:

- Increase his character's strength, which makes him stronger in combat and help him endure more damage.
- Increase the will, which helps the character cast more spells and gives more chances when fighting with will - because any combat is done either in strength or in will. Some monsters attack by will and with most other opponents (including other characters) the player may pay some mages to force them to fight by will.
- Collect some gold to buy items (for example a weapon, shield, potion, magical weapon...) or to gain these items by killing monsters etc.
- Earn experience points by killing monsters and gain abilities for these points.

== Extensions ==
Two extensions to this game have been published so far: Dragon's realm and Water realm (Czech: Dračí říše, Vodní říše). The game is played on the original game plan, but some of the artefacts can be gained only in another world (Dragon's realm or Water realm) where the hero can get teleported.
