= The Contender: The Game of Presidential Debate =

Card game

"A social card game straight from the eagle’s beak of American democracy."
- Designers: Justin Robert Young, John Teasdale, Meg Paradise and Faun Chapin of Guts & Glory
- Publishers: The Contender
- Publication: August 2015 (9 years ago)
- Genres: Party game
- Players: 3+
- Setup time: 1–2 minutes
- Playing time: 30–90 minutes
- Website: thecontender.us

The Contender box (early design)

The Contender: The Game of Presidential Debate is a United States presidential election debate-themed party game using cards. The objective of the game is to use Argument Cards to win a mock presidential debate between other potential candidates. Players take turns debating an issue drawn from a deck of Topic Cards using phrases from the Argument Cards, creating the most convincing or entertaining argument. The game's development originated from a successful Kickstarter campaign, receiving acclaim for its simple concept backed up by its satirical, mature content.

The game was originally subtitled The Game of Political Debate, but was changed prior to its retail release in December 2015.

== History ==
The Contender was produced and written by John Teasdale and Justin Robert Young, and designed by Meg Paradise and Faun Chapin of Guts & Glory. This game began in Jan 2015 with Teasdale and Young: game designers, friends, and fans of political theatre. Young, a former editor-in-chief of The Daily Orange with extensive interest in American politics, approached Teasdale with the idea to make a game that is easy to learn and lasts around fifteen minutes. Teasdale, who had experience producing both card games and Kickstarter campaigns, had been considering a game themed around debates.

== Development ==
Early Contender card designs

The Contender was financed through Kickstarter, in a campaign that went live on July 31, 2015; it met its goal of $15,000 in just 14 hours. The weekend of July 4, 2015 a print-and-play deck was sent out to playtesters. A second round of playtesting coincided with the launch of the Kickstarter as The Contender was available to play in the gameroom during Nerdtacular '15 in Snowbird, Utah, an annual convention hosted by Scott Johnson.

=== Kickstarter campaign ===
The Kickstarter campaign started with the promise of only a 364 card base deck, which increased in size as several social media "backer goals" were unlocked:

- 1000 backers adds 30 cards. Unlocked Aug 10, 2015
- 1000 followers on twitter adds 5 cards.
- 2000 backers: Base deck gets an additional 50 cards.
- Backer PAC Challenge: backerPAC Every 3 successful challenges added 10 cards to The Contender
  - Record a theme song for The Contender.
  - Film a campaign ad for The Contender.
  - Design a campaign poster for The Contender. (1/1) Completed Aug 11, 2015
  - Remix our Kickstarter video into a song. (0/2)
  - Play The Contender in an official presidential library. (0/3)
  - Plant a sign supporting The Contender in your lawn. (0/5)
  - If a current presidential candidate takes a photo with a signed card, we will make 5 cards for that candidate.
  - If a TV president takes a photo with a signed card, we will make 1 card for them.
  - Want Frank Underwood? Bug Kevin Spacey.
- AUGUST 6TH GOP DEBATE CHALLENGE
  - The Contender Wikipedia page adds 3 cards. Unlocked Aug 6, 2015
  - Photoshop 15 images of the candidates playing The Contender would add 3 cards. Images 1, 2, 3, 4, 5, 6, 7
  - Create a musical remix of our Kickstarter video adds 3 cards.

== Release & Sale ==
The Contender was available during its Kickstarter campaign for $25 for the base game and $35 for the base game and Politically Incorrect add-on pack. The 2016 Expansion Pack could be added for an additional $20, as well as a limited signed edition of the game for $150. The game received its full retail launch on Amazon in December 2015.

== Gameplay ==
=== Rules ===
The Contender website provides the rules of the game: The game begins by selecting a Moderator, who deals each player five Argument Cards, colored white. The Moderator then draws a Topic Card, colored red, and reads the card aloud to the Candidates. The Candidate to the left of the Moderator responds by playing one, two or three Argument Cards while reading the text aloud. Each time a Candidate plays a card, they must draw a card, to have a total of five cards in their hand at all times. Then the next candidate takes their turn. Play continues in a circle until all Candidates have played a total of three cards. At the end of the round, the Moderator declares a winner, who is rewarded with a Topic Card and becomes the Moderator for the next round. Whoever collects the most Topic Cards wins. The rules in The Contender are flexible and can be altered with the many house rules (which are listed in the manual and website) that players can incorporate.

=== Expansions and additional products ===
The Contender comes as a base set with 364 cards, with additional expansion packs available later as add-ons.

- The Contender: The Game of Presidential Debate - Base game of 364 cards (330 argument cards and 34 topic cards).
- The Contender: Politically Incorrect Pack - adds cards that could not be included in the family friendly base deck. Was a Kickstarter backer exclusive and is no longer in print.
- The Contender: 2016 Expansion Pack - adds 100 cards following that follow 2016 presidential debate. Includes cards inspired by 2015 and 2016 presidential debates.

== See also ==
- Dixit, a similar game using pictures
- Comedy Against Humanity
