= Codenames (board game) =

2015 spy-themed board game

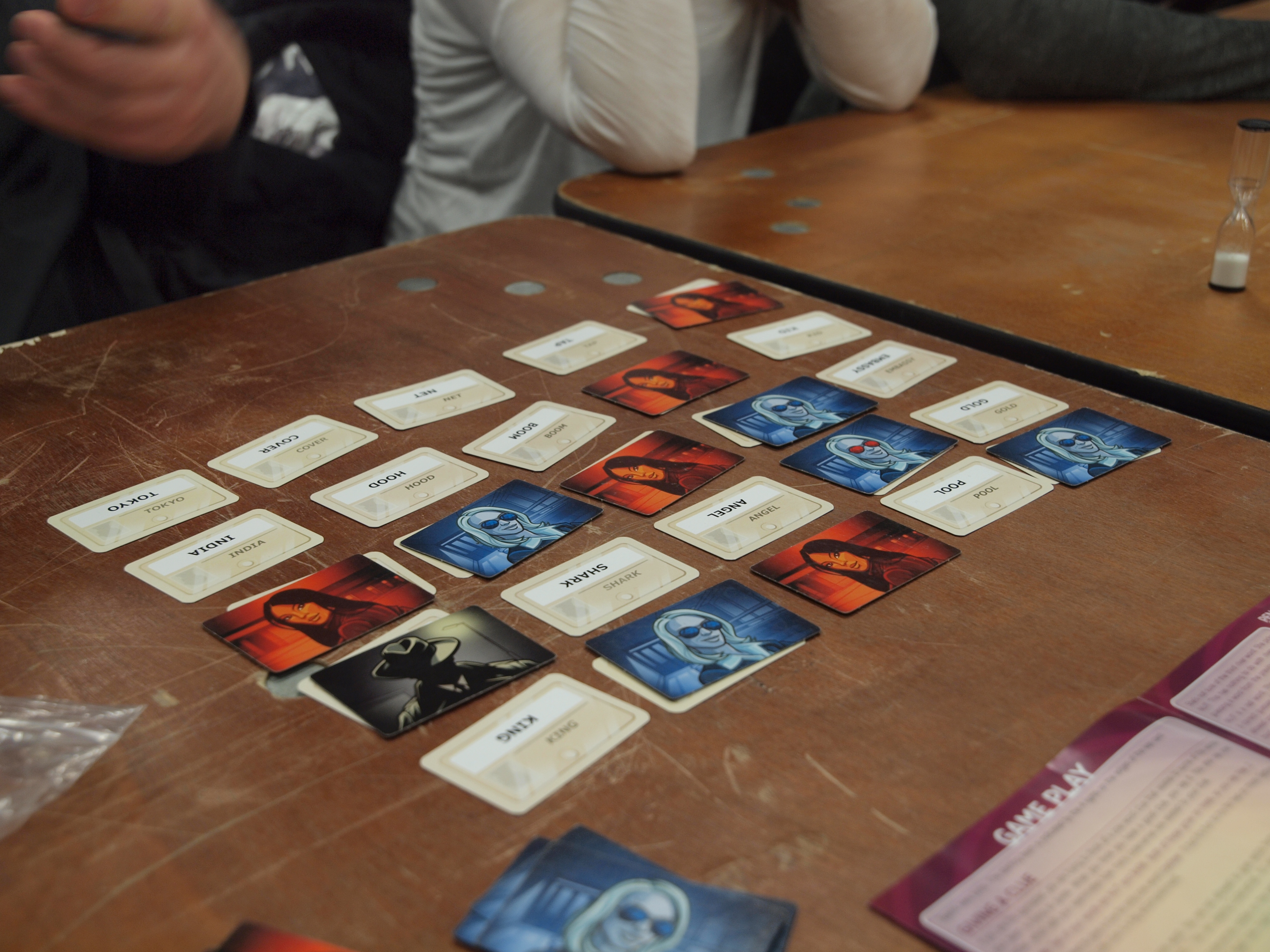
- Codenames at the end of play. The game has ended because the assassin (the black card on the left edge) has been found.
- Designers: Vlaada Chvátil
- Publishers: Czech Games Edition
- Players: 4–8+ (6 recommended)
- Setup time: 1–5 minutes
- Playing time: 15–30 minutes
- Chance: Low
- Skills: Language skills, concept identifying

Related games
- Dixit, 25 Words or Less, Mysterium, Deception

Codenames (cz. Krycí jména) is a 2015 party board game designed by Vlaada Chvátil and published by Czech Games Edition (CGE). In it, two teams compete by each having a "spymaster" give one-word clues that can point to specific words on the board. The other players on the team must attempt to guess their team's words while avoiding the words of the other team as well as an assassin square; if the latter is selected, then the team which selected it instantly loses. Victory is achieved when one team guesses all of their spymaster's assigned words.

Codenames received positive reviews and won many awards including the 2016 Spiel des Jahres award for the best board game of the year.

== Rules ==
Codenames is a game played by 4 or more players. Players are split into two teams, red and blue. One player from each team is the spymaster; the others play as field operatives.

During setup, 25 cards are randomly laid out in a 5x5 grid. Each card has a word, and cards are face-up, so all players can see all words. But what is hidden is what each card represents: some cards represent red agents (red squares); others represent blue agents (blue squares); one represents the assassin (black square); the rest are innocent bystanders (beige squares). Spymasters get a randomly dealt key card showing the board's red/blue/black/beige colors. "Lights" on the key card represent which team will go first and have an extra agent that must be found.

Teams alternate turns. Each turn, one team's spymaster gives verbal clues to help their team's field operatives guess word squares of their team's color - while avoiding squares for opposing agents, innocent bystanders, and the assassin. The verbal clue can only manifest in the form of a single word and a number; the number refers to how many word squares should be selected in total by the field operatives for that round, while the single word (ideally) provides a thematic hint guiding the field operatives toward which word squares to select. For example, if a spymaster wants their field operatives to select the words "beach", "whale", and "water", they can give the clue "ocean 3" as these three words are all related to the ocean. The single word must be thematically related, with phonetic hints discouraged—it also cannot be or contain an existing word on the 5x5 ground. If an invalid clue is given, the turn ends immediately, and the opposing team gets to reveal one of their own agents.

After the verbal clue is given, field operatives guess which words on the board go with the clue. Spymasters use the key to cover each guessed word with red/blue/beige/black to show if the word is an agent tile, a bystander tile, or the assassin tile. Field operatives must make a minimum of one guess per turn. Once a correct guess is made, field operatives may continue to make guesses or choose to end their turn voluntarily. At most, the maximum number of guesses for a turn is the number given in the verbal clue plus one. However, if a bystander or an opposing agent is revealed, the guess is considered incorrect and the turn ends immediately. If the assassin is revealed, the game ends immediately with a loss for the guessing team.

Assuming that the assassin hasn't been revealed, the game ends once all of one team's agents are found, thus achieving victory. Given the nature of the gameplay, it is entirely possible for a team to win the game during their opponents' turn. For a faster game, or in certain situations such as the opposing team taking too much time guessing, a timer, such as the hourglass timer included in the game's packaging, can be used.

== Official variations ==
Codenames: Deep Undercover was released in 2016 exclusively at Target Stores. Published by Lark & Clam and marketed as an adult party game, the game played under the same rules but featured 200 new word cards containing sexual references and double entendres, earning it a parental advisory label. The game later received an update called Codenames: Deep Undercover 2.0.

Codenames: Pictures was released in September 2016 and includes 200 two-sided cards that feature images instead of words. The game uses a 5x4 grid instead of the original's 5x5, resulting in 20 cards being used at a time, but otherwise has the same rules as the original. The image cards are surrealistic in nature, combining a few everyday concepts and objects in unusual ways. The image cards themselves can also be combined with the word cards from the original game for a more advanced gameplay variation.

Codenames: Disney Family Edition was released in September 2017, featuring characters and locations from Disney and Pixar films and including rules for an easier gameplay variation with a smaller 4x4 grid (and no assassin square), intended for younger players. Codenames: Marvel Edition was released around the same time, featuring superhero characters from Marvel Comics—specifically as depicted in the Marvel Cinematic Universe—such as Spider-Man, Doctor Strange, Iron Man and Captain America.

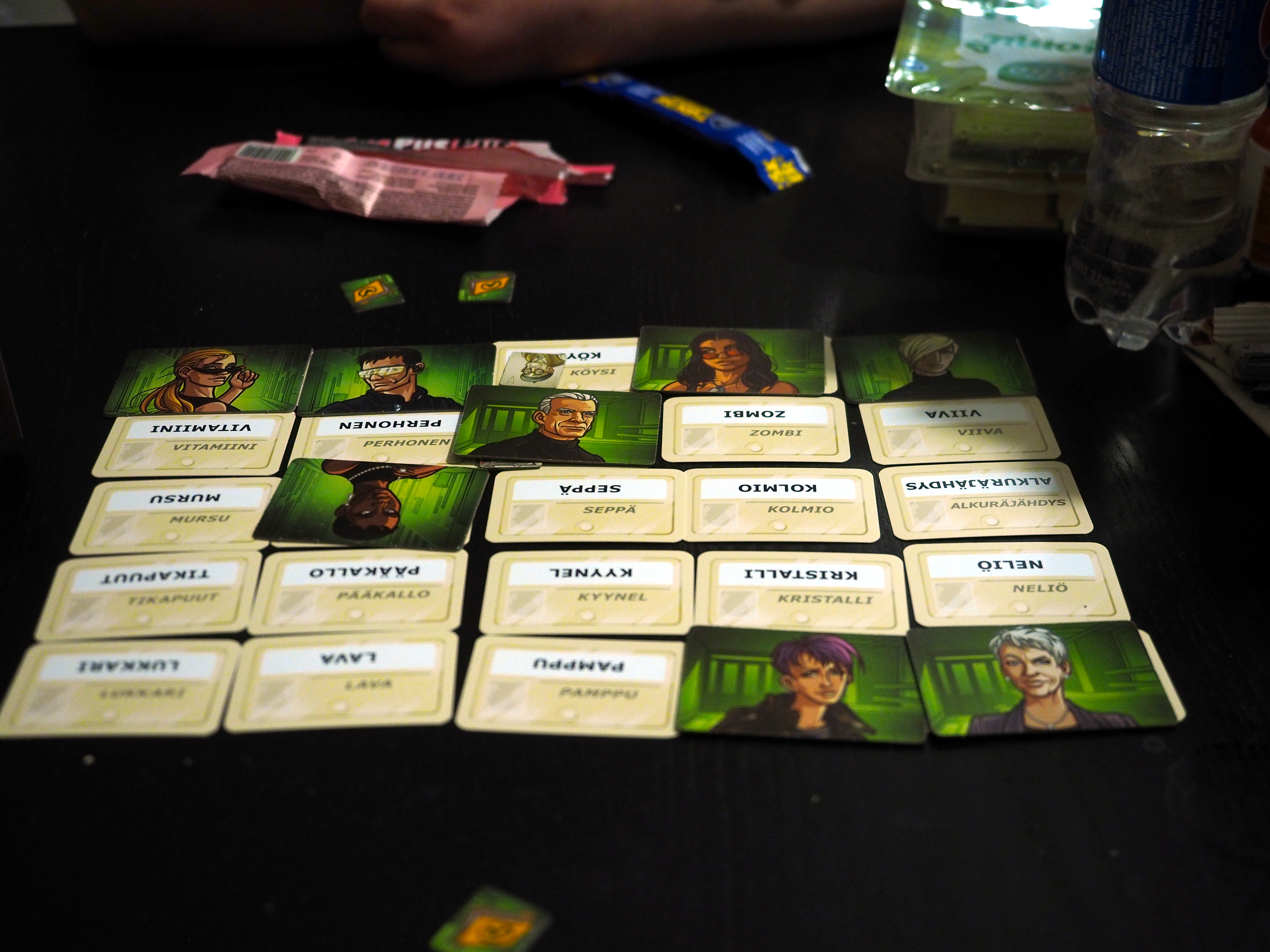
Codenames: Duet is a cooperative version of the game where two players try to find all their agents out of codename cards.

Codenames: Duet was released in October 2017 and co-designed by Scot Eaton, as a two-player cooperative version of the original game. The game packaging includes 200 new word cards which can also be used for the original game. The players sit opposite each other, each viewing one side of the double-sided key card, and the objective of the game is to identify all 15 agents (nine are visible from each side of the key card, with three overlapping) from the 5×5 grid within a given number of turns without contacting too many innocent bystanders or the assassin.

Codenames: Harry Potter was released in 2018. Themed around the novel series of the same name, it is played similarly to Codenames: Duet, with two or more players working together to reveal all Order of the Phoenix members before they run out of time while also trying to avoid the Ministry of Magic and the Death Eaters.

Codenames: XXL was released in June 2018; Codenames: Pictures XXL was released in November 2018; and Codenames: Duet XXL was released in May 2019. They are all the same as their respective original games, but with a larger format and double-sized cards and tiles.

Codenames: The Simpsons Family Edition was released in November 2019 and features characters and references from the eponymous television series; structurally, it is similar to other collaborative franchise editions like the Disney and Marvel editions. One month later, CGE released another licensed spin-off called Codenames: Blizzard Edition, featuring characters and references from the video game franchises by Blizzard Entertainment, such as Warcraft and Diablo. This particular edition was never available for retail and was gifted exclusively to Blizzard employees, though some copies of this edition were later auctioned for a charity event at the 2023 BlizzCon.

== Digital ==
The same year as the board game's release, CGE released a mobile app, called Codenames Gadget, which can randomly generate agent layouts. They also released an official web version of Codenames and Codenames Duet through their website in 2022. In September 2024, a paid mobile app called Codenames App was released for Android and iOS.

== Reception ==
Codenames received positive reviews upon its release. The game was commercially acclaimed and has been published in 38 languages: Afrikaans, Arabic, Bulgarian, Catalan, Chinese, Croatian, Czech, Danish, Dutch, English, Estonian, Filipino, Finnish, French, German, Greek, Hebrew, Hungarian, Icelandic, Indonesian, Italian, Japanese, Korean, Latvian, Lithuanian, Norwegian, Polish, Brazilian Portuguese, European Portuguese, Romanian, Russian, Serbian, Slovak, Slovene, Spanish, Swedish, Thai and Turkish, ultimately comprising six different alphabets.

Nate Anderson from Ars Technica praised the strategy and engagement involved in the game but criticized its downtime; he concluded that it was a "terrific choice for a family friendly game". Writing for Kotaku, Alex Walker stated that the game had high replay value and commended its mechanics. Oliver East, in Just Push Start, commented on the game's entertainment value and described it as an "instant hit".

== Awards ==
Year	Game	Award	Result
2015	Codenames	Origins Award: Best Family Game	Won
2015	Codenames	Origins Award: Fan Favorite Family Game	Won
2015	Codenames	Origins Award: Game of the Year	Won
2016	Codenames	Spiel des Jahres (Game of the Year)	Won
2017	Codenames Duet	Golden Geek award: Best 2-Player Game	Won
