= The Ninth Age: Fantasy Battles =

- Logo of The Ninth Age
- Publishers: The Ninth Age (association)
- Years active: Since 2015
- Genres: Miniature wargaming
- Players: 2
- Setup time: 10 minutes
- Playing time: 2 to 3 hours
- Chance: Medium (dice rolling)
- Skills: Military tactics, probability
- Website: www.the-ninth-age.com

The Ninth Age: Fantasy Battles (commonly abbreviated to The 9th Age or T9A) is a tabletop miniature wargame created and updated since 2015 by the non-profit association The Ninth Age. It simulates mass battles between two high fantasy armies represented by 28 mm scale models on square bases in rank and file formations.

== Development ==
After the release of the End Times expansions for the 8th edition of Warhammer Fantasy Battle in 2014–2015, Games Workshop discontinued both its game system and its lore. It was then replaced in its catalog by Warhammer Age of Sigmar, which left some tabletop wargamers estranged.

In June 2015, Lagge and fjugin, two prominent staff members of the Swedish Comp System (a fan-made expansion for competitive play of Warhammer), initiated a separate project called The Ninth Age and aimed at providing a new and balanced game system. The main target audience are tabletop players interested in a rank and file army game rather than skirmish games such as Age of Sigmar. A primary goal of the project has been to allow former players of Warhammer to use their model collections in games of The Ninth Age.

The project attracted the attention of wargamers and tournaments organizers in Europe and North America such as the European Tabletop Championship 2017 edition in Salamanca, Spain, and the Buckeye Battles in Columbus, Ohio. Independent miniature manufacturers, including Avatars of War, Titan Forge and Tabletop Miniatures Solutions, have launched lines of models dedicated to or compatible with the rules of The Ninth Age. The game has also become supported by BattleScribe, Quartermaster and Magnetic – Movementtray.com.

To ease the introduction of new players to the game, the authors released the Quick Starter edition in April 2017. It represents a faster and easier version of the core game, played on a smaller scale. The 72 page rulebook includes elementary lists for all 16 factions, an introduction to the world of the Ninth Age and unique artwork.

The second edition of the ruleset was released in December 2018 after a year of beta testing and is intended to stay unchanged for several years during which the team will focus on the production of new army books.

== Army books ==
Each army book, free to download from the game's website, details the composition and rules of the military of a specific faction. The team is gradually converting slim books, focused solely on the rules, into "Legendary" books with artwork and lore background.

Most of the lore and units of the Ninth Age are inspired by Historical fantasy, mythologies, fairy tales, human History and natural history, for instance the Beast Herds' Jabberwock, the Vampire Covenant's Varkolak and the Saurian Ancients' Taurosaur.

=== Core armies ===
The game fully supports 16 armies.

Army name	Short description	Book content
Beast Herds	Minotaurs, centaurs and their extended family: what they lack in armour and shooting, they make up in raw power, speed and ambushing capabilities.	Slim
Daemon Legions	Malicious creatures from another world able to build an army from a wide roster of highly specialized and autonomous units.	Full
Dread Elves	These violent raiders form a fragile but mobile and offensive army with access to multiple unit synergies.	In alpha
Dwarven Holds	The sturdy and stoic dwarves are able to field first-rate infantry troops, supported by runes and reliable shooting weapons.	Slim
Empire of Sonnstahl	An all-rounder human military force based on unit synergies and rich options in infantry, cavalry, and artillery.	Slim
Highborn Elves	High quality elvish troops and versatile flying monsters, capable in both offensive and defensive tactics.	Slim
Infernal Dwarves	A composite army of armoured dwarves, bound daemons, vassals and slaves. Great firepower, in every sense of the word.	In beta
Kingdom of Equitaine	Knights in shining armour and their followers. The greatest range of heavy cavalry in the game, supported by foot knights, peasants and artillery.	In redesign
Ogre Khans	Large, brutal creatures equipped with oversized weapons and impressive appetites, riding mighty prehistoric beasts into battle.	Slim
Orcs and Goblins	The many warborn races can field a wide range of foot and mounted troops, along with devastating weapons and monsters.	Slim
Saurian Ancients	Reptilian humanoids and their tamed dinosaurs. Tough melee units and short-range shooters led by powerful characters.	Slim
Sylvan Elves	Master archers and excellent riders, supported by the strength and staying power of dryads and other wild creatures of the woodlands.	Art and lore
Vermin Swarm	Ratmen and rats of all sizes without any cavalry or flying units, but allowed to shoot into melee regardless of friendly casualties.	In alpha
Undying Dynasties	The dead Pharaohs lead multitudes of brittle skeletons overshadowed by gigantic creatures such as the Sphinx and the Colossus.	Art and lore
Vampire Covenant	Vampires and necromancers summon all kinds of horrors, from zombies and wraiths to a menagerie of flying and crawling monstrosities. No shooting.	Slim
Warriors of the Dark Gods	Human worshippers of the Seven Sins. A melée-oriented army with heavy infantry and cavalry options supported by dangerous leaders.	Full

After the release of the full books of the Warriors of the Dark Gods and the Daemon Legions in 2018, followed by the beta release of the Infernal Dwarves in 2019, the team has announced that the next armies to be treated with a major overhaul will be the Dread Elves, the Vermin Swarm and the Kingdom of Equitaine.

=== Other armies ===
In addition to the 16 core armies, the game includes a smaller number of armies which are not designed for competitive play.

Army name	Short description	Book content
Asklanders	Hardy human footsoldiers (inspired by the Vikings) supported by monsters from Norse mythology	Auxiliary for the Warriors of the Dark Gods, released
Cultists	A fifth column uprising mixing ordinary heretics and the daemons they've summoned	Auxiliary for the Daemon Legions, released
Hobgoblins	Hobgoblin beast tamers allied to the Infernal Dwarves	Auxiliary for the Infernal Dwarves, released
Iron Crowns	Mercenaries of various origins - to be developed after the full army books of the core factions	Self-standing, unreleased
Makhars	Steppe horsemen led by Khagans (inspired by the Mongols and the Huns)	Auxiliary for the Warriors of the Dark Gods, released
Monosin / Monogod Daemons	Daemonic armies dedicated to a single cult, such as Gluttony	Auxiliary for the Daemon Legions, in design
Oceanborn	Comedy faction made of real and fantasy sea creatures such as mermaids, released as an April fool in 2016	Self-standing, discontinued

In parallel to the official content, homebrew army books are also developed and shared by community members on the forum of the game.

== The 9th Scroll ==
The 9th Scroll is a bi-monthly online magazine available for free on the game's website, featuring interviews, do-it-yourself tutorials, homebrew rules, armies showcases and other articles from the community and the T9A staff. Issue 4 (July 2017) has over 75.000 downloads.

== Relation to Games Workshop's Warhammer: Fantasy Battles ==
Similarities: The Ninth Age: Fantasy Battles invention was triggered by the discontinuation of WHFB after the End Times campaign. A main goal of the project was to create a game that continues on the same level of scale (i.e. army size, model count, game duration) and playstyle. The playstyle was specifically important as Games Workshop follow-up product "Age of Sigmar" changed in this regard from a "Rank and File" system to a "Skirmish" system. Additional goals were to allow former WHFB players to carry over their collections to The Ninth Age without greater modifications. This directly resulted in the same initial number of playable armies.

Differences: Opposed to WHFB, T9A is a model-agnostic system. There are no specific T9A models to represent each unit entry. This allows manufacturers to create a wide range of compatible models, which can look quite differently. This also means, that there is no "reference model" for an entry in the respective army books. Another important goal is set internal and external balance of army books to increase the playability of all entries in the respective army books. T9A does not aim to release new rules or create an expanding set of options in the playable armies. As a direct result of balancing considerations, the army categorizations are different for each army. Where WHFB used a fix separation of core/special/rare entries, T9A books categorize armies on the roles of units, e.g. shooting units, ambushing units, highly-mobile units may have their own category. Based on the first two complete revisions of army books (Warriors of the Dark Gods and Daemon Legions), the difference in army organisations and unit entries will become even more distinct over time, as the so-called Legendary Army Books (LABs) are developed and finished.
