= Contenda =

Coordinates: 25.6758°S 49.535°W

- Municipality
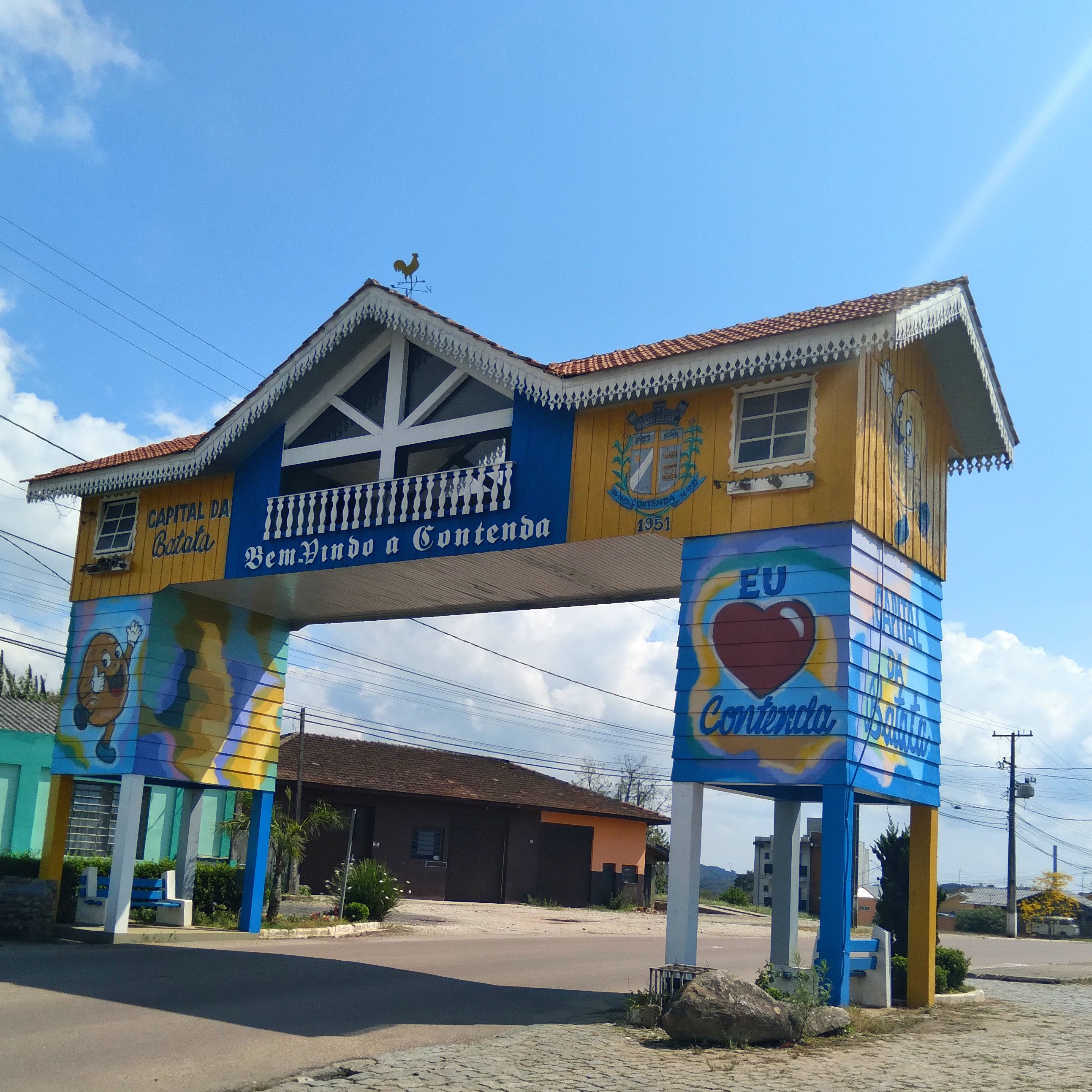

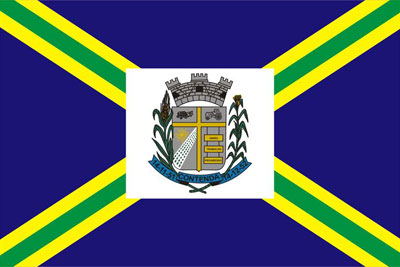
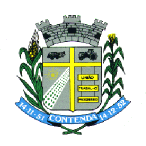
- Flag Coat of arms
- Interactive map of Contenda
- Country: Brazil
- Region: Southern
- State: Paraná
- Mesoregion: Metropolitana de Curitiba

Population (2020)
  - Total: 18,837
- Time zone: UTC−3 (BRT)

Contenda is a municipality in the state of Paraná in the South Region of Brazil.

- Named Potato Capital after the Emperor D. Pedro II visit Lapa City, at 1880. área : 344,8 km².
- A healthy country town province of plantation by Curitiba

== See also ==
- List of municipalities in Paraná
