= Dungeon Lords (board game) =

2009 board game

Dungeon Lords is a fantasy-themed euro-style board game with focus on resource management for 2-4 players, released in 2009. It was designed by Vlaada Chvátil.

Each player is a lord competing with other players to build a dungeon with rooms and traps, and defending against invaders.

== See also ==
- Dungeon Keeper
