= Dixit (board game) =

2008 French card game

- Old box cover of Dixit
- Designers: Jean-Louis Roubira
- Illustrators: Marie Cardouat; Pierre Lechevalier (Pierô); Xavier Collette; Clément Lefèvre; Franck Dion; Carine Hinder; Jérôme Pélissier; Marina Coudray; Paul Echegoyen; Sébastien Telleschi
- Publishers: Libellud
- Publication: 2008; 18 years ago
- Players: 3 to 6
- Playing time: 30 minutes
- Website: www.libellud.com

Dixit (Latin: dixit, Latin pronunciation: [ˈdiːksit], "he/she/it said"), is a French board game created by Jean-Louis Roubira, illustrated by Marie Cardouat, and published by Libellud. Using a set of cards illustrated with dreamlike images, players select cards that match a title suggested by the designated storyteller player, and attempt to guess which card the storyteller selected. The game was introduced in 2008. Dixit won the 2010 Spiel des Jahres award.

== Gameplay ==
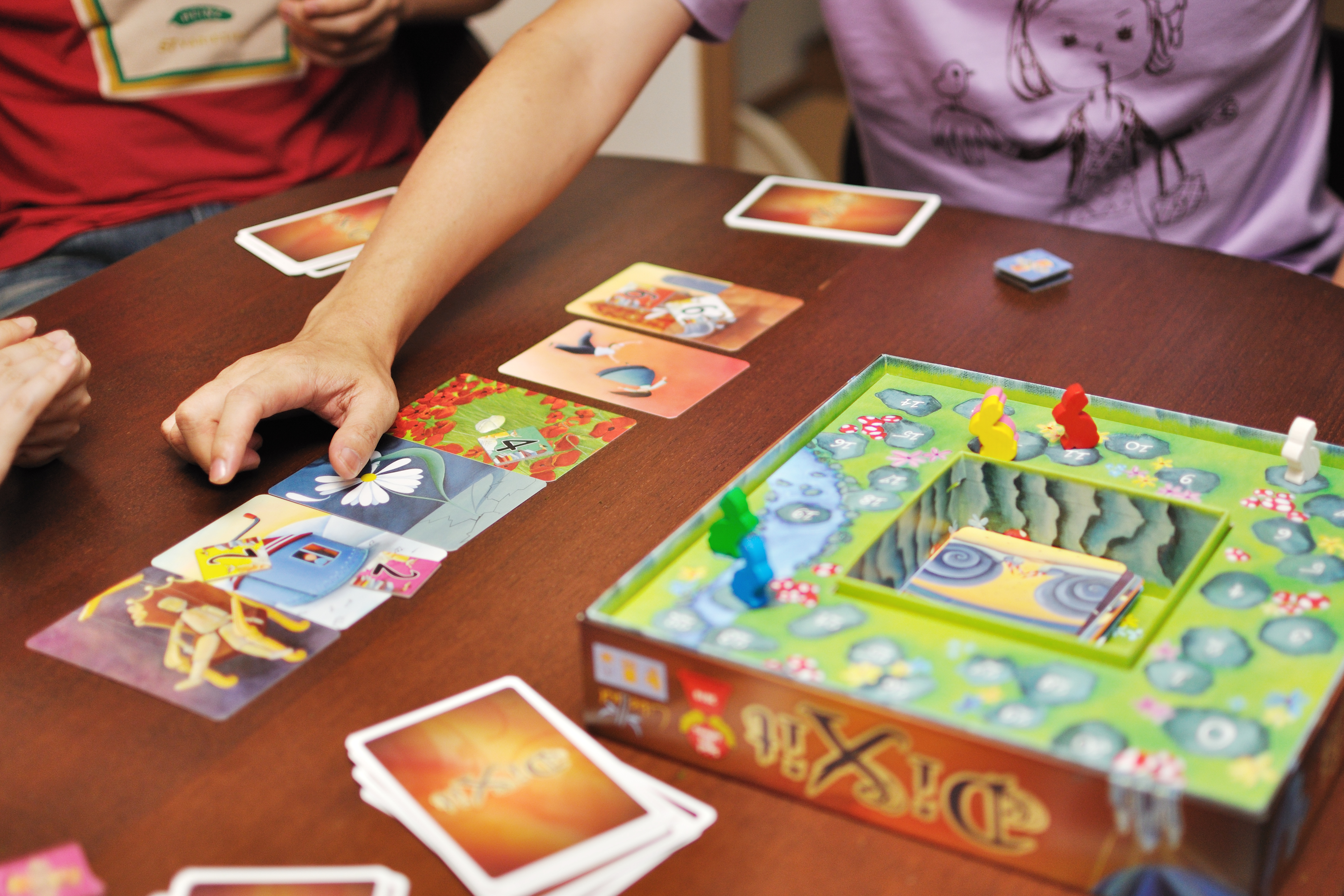
A game of Dixit in progress. Six cards have been dealt out and voted on, and the storyteller is indicating which story belonged to them. To the right, scores are tracked by rabbit-shaped tokens on a scoring track.

Each player is dealt six cards to start the game from a shuffled deck, which becomes the draw pile. For a three-player game, each player is dealt seven cards instead. Each player takes a turn as the storyteller.

The storyteller looks at the six cards in their hand and selects one, composing a sentence or phrase that might describe it and says it out loud, without showing the card to the other players. The storyteller's goal is to provide a description that is ambiguous enough that not all other players will recognize the card, yet relevant enough that some will.

Every other (non-storyteller) player then selects one card from their own hand which best matches the sentence given by the storyteller. In a three-player game, the two non-storyteller players each select two cards from their hand. Then each non-storyteller player gives the selected card(s) to the storyteller face down, without showing it to the others. The storyteller shuffles the card they had described with the cards received from the other players, and all of the selected cards are then dealt face up. The minimum number of cards in the tableau for voting is five, from a three or four player game.

Each player (except for the storyteller) then secretly guesses which picture was the storyteller's, using numbered voting chips. Each voting player cannot vote for the card(s) they had selected for the tableau. For games with seven or more players (under the Odyssey rules), each voting player may vote for a second image. Once the votes have been revealed, scoring is based on the number of votes that correctly guessed the storyteller's card.

After voting and scoring are complete for the turn, the cards in the tableau are moved to a discard pile, face-up. Each player draws one new card from the draw pile so that everyone starts the next turn with six cards in their hand. Again, in a three-player game, the non-storyteller players each draw two cards, while the storyteller draws one to maintain seven cards in their hand. If there are not enough cards remaining in the draw pile, the discard pile is shuffled into the draw pile. For the next turn, the player to the left of the storyteller becomes the new storyteller.

=== Scoring ===
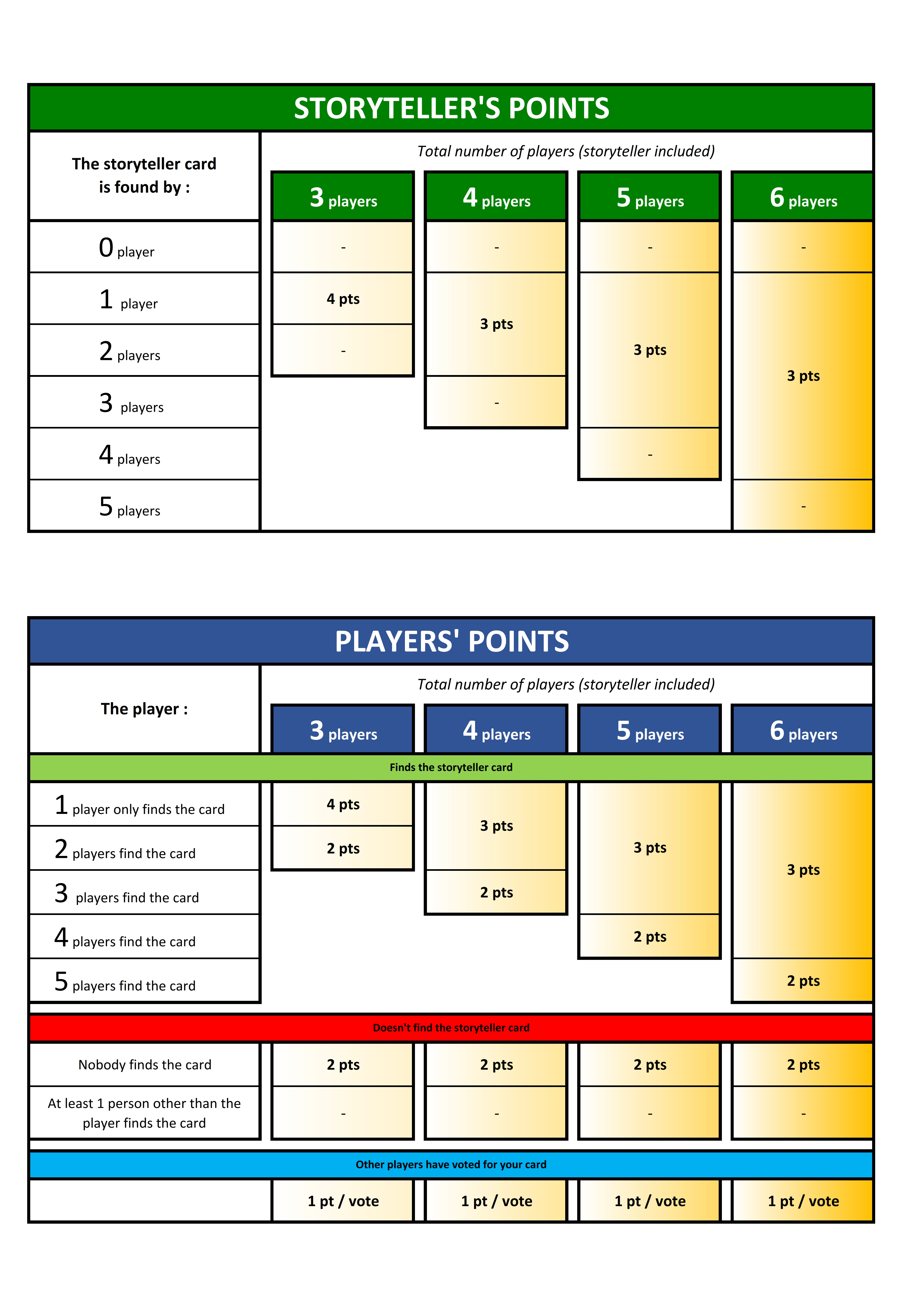
Scoring according to Dixit revised rules

The original rules were revised after publication.

The storyteller scores points if some, but not all, players guess correctly; the other players score points individually for having correctly guessed the storyteller's card, or if another player or players select the card they originally gave to the storyteller. In addition, if none of the players guessed correctly, the players receive points while the storyteller does not.

Points received per Dixit turn for a game with n players
Number of Storyteller card votes		Storyteller	Each non-storyteller player	
Number of Storyteller card votes		Storyteller	Basic score	Bonus points
n-1	(all players voted for the storyteller's card)	0	2 (each)	N/A
0	(no players voted for the storyteller's card)	0	2 (each)	1 (for each vote received) (Note: In the original rules, players who did not find the storyteller's card were ineligible for bonus points. In the revised rules, each of the other players receive +1 bonus point per vote for their own card.) (Note: A maximum of three bonus points are awarded under Odyssey rules.); 1 (for single vote) (Note: Voting players who selected the storyteller's card and only voted once receive a bonus point, for 7+ player games under Odyssey rules.)
≥1 and <n-1	(at least one, but not all players voted for the storyteller's card)	3	3 (for each player that voted for the storyteller's card)	1 (for each vote received); 1 (for single vote)
≥1 and <n-1	(at least one, but not all players voted for the storyteller's card)	3	0 (for each player that voted for another card)	1 (for each vote received); 1 (for single vote)

Notes

The players move their rabbits along the track on the board according to the points scored.

=== Endgame ===
In the original rules, the winner is the first player to reach 30 points. In the revised rules, the winner is the player with the most points when the last card is drawn.

=== Equipment ===
All basic editions of the game come with 84 illustrated cards.

The original published versions were limited to six players by providing six wooden rabbit markers and thirty-six voting tokens (six color-coordinated sets, each numbered one to six). The 2021 refreshed edition accommodates up to eight players, with eight voting dials, eight wooden rabbit markers, and one game board. The game board has a scoring track, eight card slots, and a graphical aid as a reminder of the scoring system.

== Other editions ==
An iOS app for Dixit was released in 2011. An updated version, named Dixit World, was announced in 2018 for iOS and Android. Dixit World beta testing began in 2020.

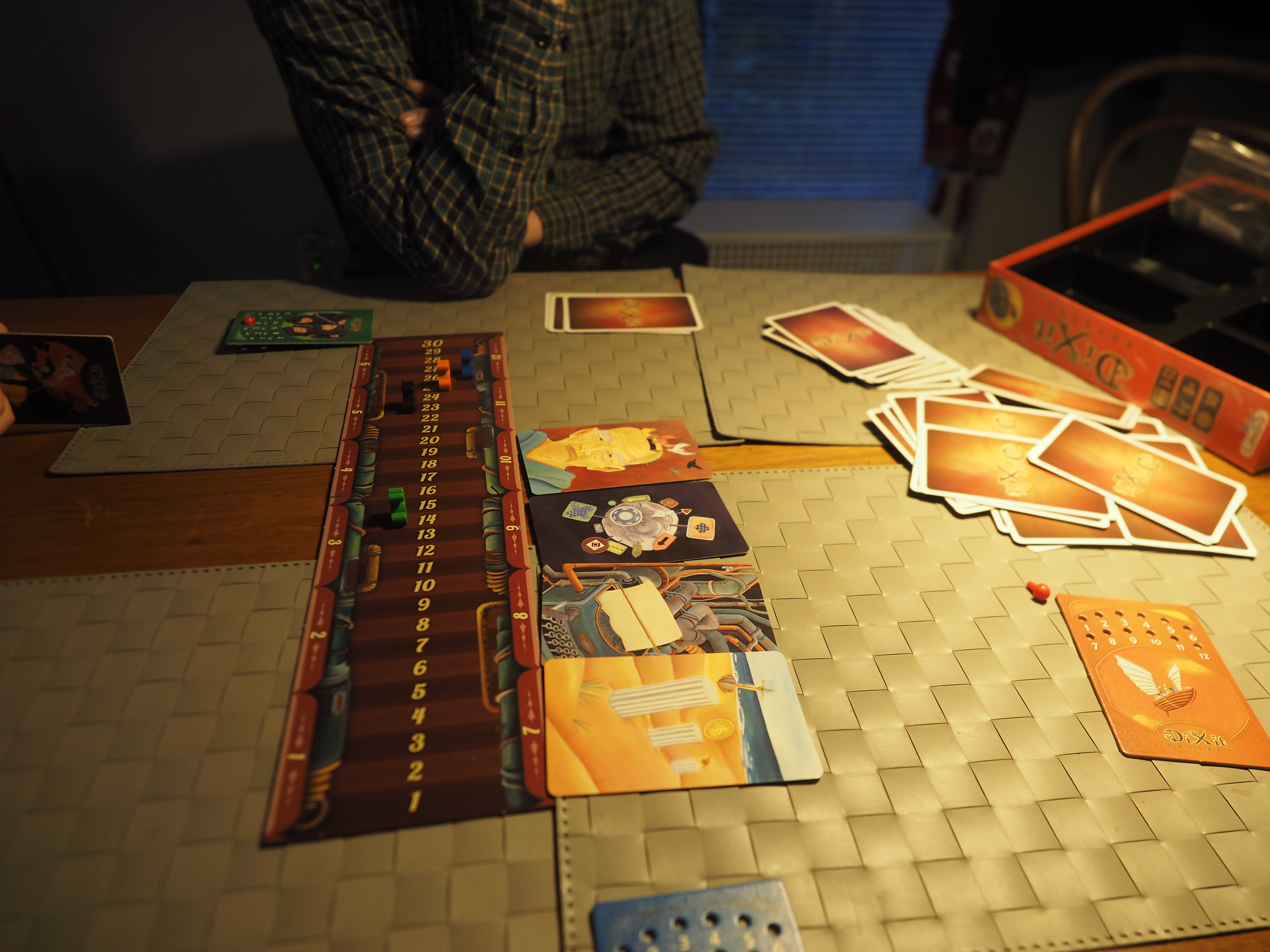
Dixit Odyssey game in progress, showing scoring track with 12 card slots

Multiple versions of the game have been published, with minor updates to the equipment included with the original edition in 2012 and again in 2021.

Expansion sets, each containing 84 cards, were published starting in 2010.

A version for up to 12 players was published in 2011 (Dixit Odyssey), both as a standalone game and as an expansion for owners of the original game. Odyssey has slightly revised rules for games with a larger number of players. The revised equipment for Odyssey includes 12 voting boards, rather than voting tile sets, and 24 pegs that fit in the holes of the voting board to register votes.

Dixit versions and expansions
No.	Name	Year	Cards included	Artist	Notes
−	Dixit ("International Rules")	2008	84	Marie Cardouat	Original printing, scoring track built into box, 3–6 players.
−	Dixit Odyssey	2011	84	Pierre Lechevalier and Marie Cardouat	Accommodates 3–12 players. Features updated artwork; illustrations by Pierre Lechevalier (Pierô), with color by Cardouat.
−	Dixit ("Family")	2012	84	Marie Cardouat	2012 update, distinguished by "Family" printed on front with green background. Folding scoring track, 3–6 players; box holds 336 cards.
−	Dixit (2021 refresh)	2021	84	Marie Cardouat	Accommodates 3–8 players, slightly different equipment (voting dials instead of tiles).
−	Dixit Odyssey	2011	—	—	Additional rabbit tokens and voting tiles for up to 12 players; no cards included
2	Quest	2010	84	Marie Cardouat	
3	Journey	2012	84	Xavier Collette	Also released as a standalone version in the United States by Asmodee, with plastic pawns and folding board
4	Origins	2013	84	Clément Lefèvre	
5	Daydreams	2014	84	Franck Dion	
6	Memories	2015	84	Carine Hinder and Jérôme Pélissier	
7	Revelations	2016	84	Marina Coudray	
8	Harmonies	2017	84	Paul Echegoyen	
9	Anniversary	2018	84	(multiple)	Includes image cards from the artists that created Dixit expansion sets
10	Mirrors	2020	84	Sébastien Telleschi	
11	MNK	2023	84	(multiple)	Cooperation between National Museum in Kraków, Libellud Studio and Rebel Publishing House

=== Dixit Party ===
Dixit Party is a variation for six or more players, contained in the rules of Dixit Odyssey.

In Dixit Party, each player receives five image cards (instead of six) and takes a green voting token, except for the storyteller, who takes a red token. The storyteller looks at their hand and speaks a phrase that is not related to any image card in their hand. Play then proceeds according to the regular rules, with all players, including the storyteller, selecting an image card that best matches the phrase; the selected image cards are shuffled and placed face-up in a tableau. Each player votes for the image card they feel best matches the phrase.

The image card that receives the most votes will score points for each player that voted for it, up to a maximum of five points; for example, if the most popular image card received eight votes, the score would be capped at five points each for the eight players that voted for it. However, the storyteller also has a vote (using the red token) and anyone who voted for the image card also voted by the storyteller will receive no points. A player that voted for an image that received only one vote also scores no points.

=== Team Dixit ===
Team Dixit is a variation for an even number of six or more players, playing in teams of two, contained in the rules of Dixit Odyssey.

In Team Dixit, each individual player receives four cards each. After the storyteller gives the clue, the storyteller's teammate hands a card to the storyteller for the tableau (i.e., that team contributes two cards), and each other team hands in a single card for the tableau. Each other team may discuss which card they will turn in, provided the conversation takes place in front of the other players and neither teammate shows their cards. Both the storyteller and their teammate are not allowed to vote.

Scoring is the same as regular Dixit, and the game ends when each player has had a chance to be the storyteller.

=== Spin-offs ===
==== Dixit Jinx ====
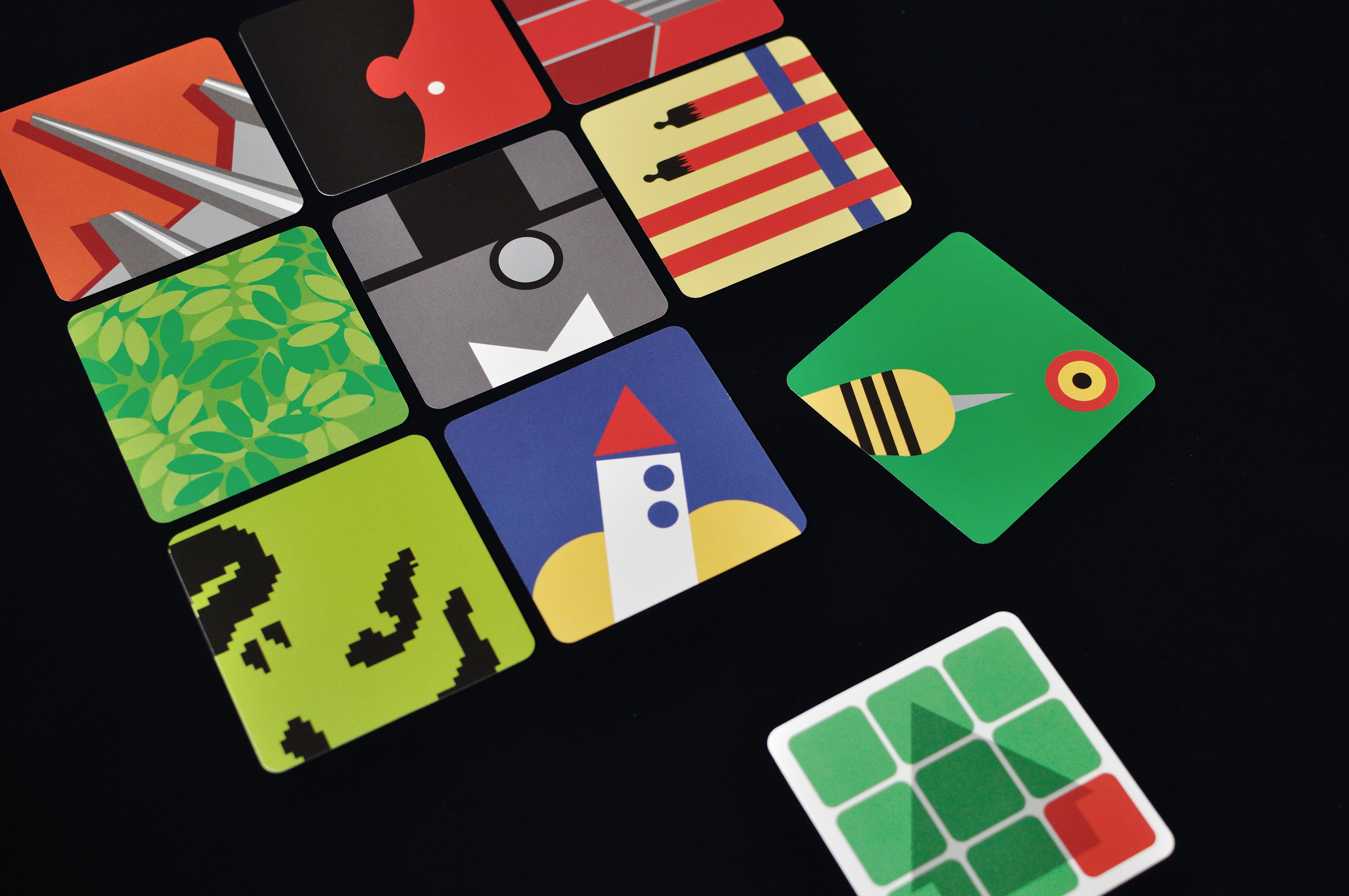
Sample tableau in Dixit Jinx, with position card indicating lower right corner

Dixit Jinx is a spin-off with a similar gameplay mechanic of describing cards in a tableau, published in 2012. However, Jinx uses a streamlined set of equipment and more abstract images. It was designed by Josep M. Allué and illustrated by Dominique Ehrhard. Play has been described as a cross between Dixit and Jungle Speed.

Jinx has 71 image cards and 9 position cards. To start, the image card deck is pared down according to the number of players and shuffled to form the draw pile:

- 3 players: 30 image cards are removed, 41 image cards remain
- 4 players: 20 image cards are removed, 51 image cards remain
- 5 players: 10 image cards are removed, 61 image cards remain
- 6 players: All 71 image cards remain

9 of the image cards are drawn from the shuffled image card deck and placed face-up in a 3×3 array. The youngest player is the first active player, shuffling the position card deck and drawing one, but not revealing it to the other players. The position card drawn indicates which of the image cards in the 3×3 tableau has been selected as the active player's image card, which they describe verbally with a clue.

Once the clue is announced, each of the other players selects the most appropriate card by placing their finger on the card. Only one finger is allowed per card, so if two (or more) players select the same card, the first player that shouts "Jinx" keeps their selection, while the other(s) must select a different card. Once a card is selected by a player, the active player indicates if that player has correctly guessed the active player's image card. If the guess is incorrect, the player making the incorrect guess removes their finger and is not allowed to continue guessing. If the guess is correct, the turn ends. Any card selections remaining after the correct guess are ignored.

- The active player's image card is moved in front of the player who correctly guessed it.
- Image cards that were guessed incorrectly prior to the correct guess are taken off the tableau and placed in front of the active player.
- If the selected image card is guessed correctly by the first player to select a card in the tableau, one image card is removed from the pile of the active player and returned to the bottom of the deck.
- The remaining cards in the tableau are moved to the discard pile. If the selected image card is not correctly guessed, all of the cards in the tableau are discarded.

The game ends when a 3×3 square tableau can no longer be made from the remaining image cards in the draw pile. The winner is the player with the most image cards at the end of the game.

==== Stella ====
Stella – Dixit Universe is a related game designed by Gérald Cattiaux and Jean-Louis Roubira, with artwork by Jérôme Pélissier, first published in October 2021.

Stella has a similar illustrated 84-card deck that is compatible with Dixit, but the gameplay is different, facilitated by the following equipment:

- 110 Word Cards, divided as:
  - 96 Two-Word Cards
  - 4 Discovery Word Cards
  - 10 Custom Word Cards
- 10 tokens, divided as:
  - 6 Lantern Tokens (double-sided)
  - 4 Round Tokens (numbered I to IV)
- 1 First Scout Pawn
- 6 Erasable Personal Slates
- 1 Erasable Scoring Slate

To start, the image deck is shuffled and 15 cards are dealt face-up to form a tableau of 3 rows and 5 columns next to the game board. The 96 word card deck is shuffled and 4 cards are dealt face-down next to the tableau as a draw pile. For beginners, it is suggested the Discovery Word sub-deck is used instead. One personal slate is distributed to each player, and one of the players is selected to start the game, by giving them the First Scout Pawn.

The designated scout flips the first word card over and reads it aloud, which becomes the clue word for the first of four rounds. By mutual agreement, the players may choose to use the alternate word on the word card. The Personal Slate includes a reproduction of the game board, which provides a consistent orientation for all players. Each player then associates from 1 to 10 cards in the tableau with the clue word, by marking the associated card positions on the Personal Slate with a cross.

After each player has completed their card selection, they announce the number of cards they had selected and place their lantern token on the game board, lighted side up. If one player has selected more cards than the others, that player must turn their lantern token over, dark side up, indicating they are in the dark. If the maximum number of cards are selected by more than one player, no further action is required and all players remain in the light.

The scout starts the matching phase of the game by pointing to one of the cards in the tableau which they had selected. All players (including the scout) who selected the same card receive a spark and fill in two stars on their Personal Slate matching that card position. If only one other player (in addition to the scout) selected the same card, those two players receive a super spark and fill in three stars on their Personal Slate. If no players selected the same card, the scout has fallen: they are unable to continue filling stars or bonus stars for this round, and the First Scout Token is passed on to the next player. Because the scout's turn continues until that scout has fallen, the scout should start with the most obvious match first, to ensure they can accumulate some sparks. The round continues until all players have fallen, or the players who have not served as scout have no cards left to confirm.

The score for each round is the number of stars that were filled during that round on each player's Personal Slate. If a player is in the dark, their score is penalized by -1 for each match (e.g., 1 point for a spark and 2 points for a super spark) unless all the cards they had selected resulted in a spark or super spark. In that case, the player in the dark did not fall and they score full points for each match.

To set up the next round, the Word Card that was used is returned to the box, the First Scout Pawn is passed clockwise, and the active round token is flipped over, which indicates which row of image cards in the tableau should be replaced. The winner is the player that accumulates the most points through four rounds.

== Reception ==
Dixit has received highly positive reviews and over 30 awards and nominations. BGL described it as a card game that "allows creativity and imagination to run riot", while Shut Up & Sit Down referred to it as "one of those very special game ideas that makes the most of the human brain while also keeping its rules to a minimum". Father Geek noted that Dixit is "one of those rare games that can be played with a mixed age and skill group with little to no difficulty". The Dixit expansions have also been well received by critics.

In a review of Dixit in Black Gate, Andrew Zimmerman Jones found the illustrations on the cards "attractive", and the cards in the expansions "fantastic".

Dixit was featured in a 2012 episode of TableTop, a web video series hosted by Wil Wheaton and broadcast on Felicia Day's YouTube channel Geek & Sundry. The episode showed a match between Leo Chu, Casey McKinnon, Beth Riesgraf, and Wheaton, won by Riesgraf.

The game mechanic of submitting a response has been compared to the contemporary Apples to Apples and the earlier game Balderdash, which has players vote for submitted responses.

== Awards ==
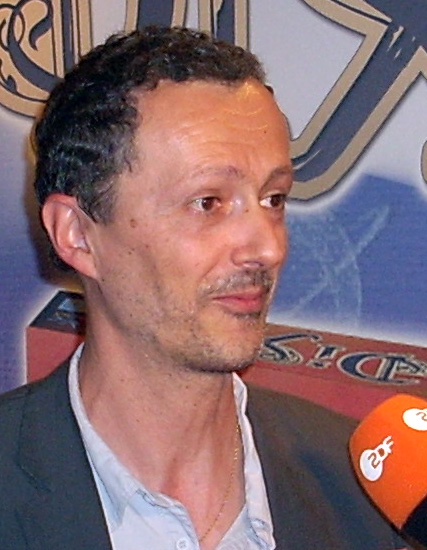
Jean-Louis Roubira, designer of the game Dixit.

- 2009 As d'Or – Jeu de l'Année Winner
- 2009 Juego del Año Winner
- 2009 Lys Grand Public Winner
- 2010 Games Magazine Best New Party Game of the Year Award Winner
- 2010 Spiel Des Jahres Winner
- 2010 Vuoden Peli Family Game of the Year Winner
- 2010 Hungarian Board Game Award Winner
- 2010 Hra roku Winner
- 2011 Ludoteca Ideale Official Selection Winner

== See also ==
- Apples to Apples
- Balderdash
- "Mysterium"
- Taboo (game)
