= The Gallerist (board game) =

Board game

The Gallerist is a 2015 worker placement strategy board game published by Eagle-Gryphon Games and designed by Vital Lacerda.

== Awards ==
- 2015 Cardboard Republic Tactician Laurel Winner
