= List of dice games =

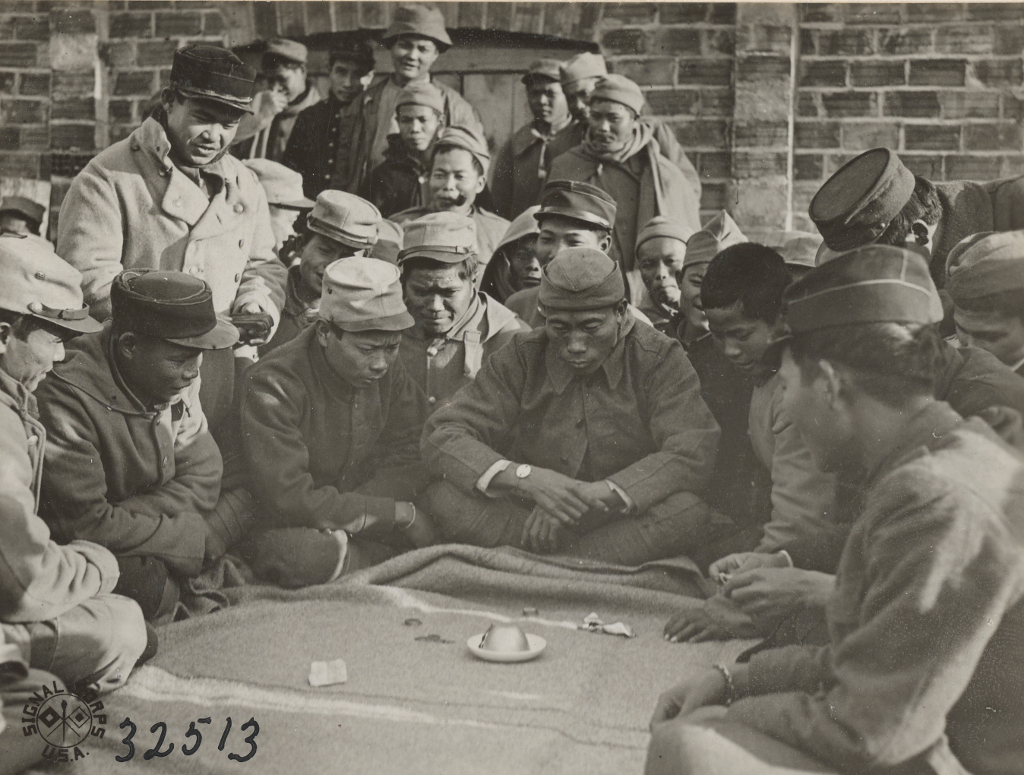
A game of chuck-a-luck in progress

Dice games are games that use or incorporate one or more dice as their sole or central component, usually as a random device.

== Traditional ==
- Astronomical chess
- Backgammon
- Balut
- Bar dice
- Bầu cua cá cọp
- Beer die
- Beetle
- Bidou
- Biscuit
- Bo Bing (Pua Tiong Chiu)
- Bunco
- Cacho Alalay
- Cee-lo
- Chaupar
- Chō-han
- Choboichi
- Chuck-a-luck
- Crag
- Craps / Seven-eleven
- Crown and Anchor
- Daldøs
- Dayakattai
- Dice chess
- Drop Dead
- Dudo
- Farkle
- Generala
- Glückshaus (House of Fortune)
- Hazard
- High jinks
- Hoo Hey How
- Jacquet
- Liar's dice
- Macao
- Mexico
- Mia
- Midnight
- Mumchance
- Mutschelspiele
- Passe-dix
- Pencil cricket
- Petals Around the Rose
- Pig
- Poker dice
- Pugasaing
- Rattle and snap
- Sa'-ro
- Sevens, elevens, and doubles
- Ship, captain, and crew
- Sho
- Shut the box
- Sic Bo
- Three man
- Tien Gow
- Trictrac
- Yacht
- Yatzy

== Proprietary ==
- Animal Husbandry
- Boggle
- Button Men
- Can't Stop
- Catan Dice Game
- Cosmic Wimpout
- Cthulhu Dice
- dbDice
- Dead Man's Dice
- Dice Throne
- Diceball!
- Don't Go to Jail
- Elder Sign
- The Game
- Kismet
- Las Vegas
- Ludo
- Owzthat
- Pandemic: The Cure
- Pass the Pigs
- Perquackey
- Pirateer
- Quarriors!
- Roll for the Galaxy
- Roll Player
- Sagrada
- Scribbage
- Snout!
- To Court the King
- Yahtzee
- Zombie Dice

== Collectible dice games ==
Patterned after the success of collectible card games, a number of collectible dice games have been published. Although most of these collectible dice games are long out-of-print, there is still a small following for many of them.

Some collectible dice games include:

- Battle Dice
- Cookie Fu
- Demon Dice
- Dicemaster: Cities of Doom (1996 game)
- Dice Masters (2012 system designed for Quarriors! that expanded to other games)
- Diceland
- Dragon Dice
- Star Trek: The Next Generation Collectible Dice Game

== See also ==
- List of card games by number of cards
- List of domino games
- List of cross and circle games
