= Drop Dead (disambiguation) =

"Drop Dead" is a 2026 single by Olivia Rodrigo.

Drop Dead, Drop dead, or Dropdead may also refer to:

== Arts, entertainment, and media ==
=== Music ===
==== Groups and labels ====
- Dropdead, a hardcore punk band of Rhode Island

==== Albums ====
- Drop Dead (album), a 1984 LP by the hardcore punk band Siege

==== Songs ====
- "Drop Dead", a song by MissMatch, 2007
- "Drop Dead", B-side to the single "Happy House" by Siouxsie and the Banshees
- "Drop Dead", song by the band Electro Hippies
- "Drop Dead", 2020 song by artist Grandson, with its 2021 remix featuring Kesha and Travis Barker
- "Drop Dead", song by Holly Humberstone from Falling Asleep at the Wheel, 2020

=== Other uses in arts, entertainment, and media ===
- Drop Dead (dice game), a dice game
- Drop Dead Festival, an annual Deathrock festival held in New York
- "Drop Dead" (Randall & Hopkirk (Deceased)), a 2000 television episode
- "Drop Dead", a 1956 science fiction short story by Clifford D. Simak

== Other uses ==
- Drop dead date, a time limit in contract law or a court order
- Drop dead (computing), an informal name for an illegal instruction on the Motorola 6800 CPU
- Ford to City: Drop Dead, a headline in the New York Daily News following a speech by president Gerald Ford

== See also ==
- Dead drop, espionage technique of leaving an item to be collected by another who knows it being there to be a secret
