= Pub game =

Game traditionally played in or outside pubs and bars

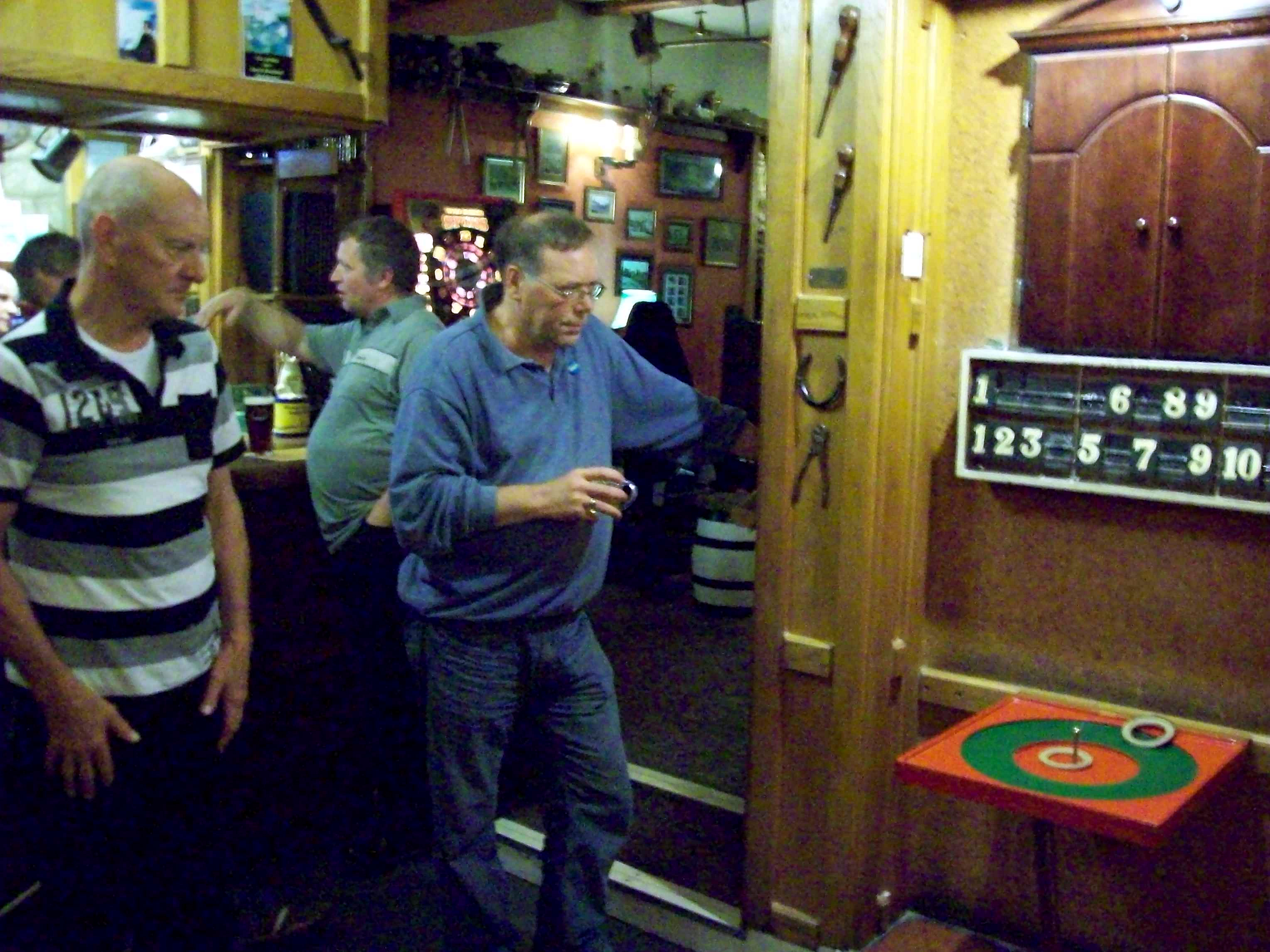
A game of indoor quoits, being played at a pub in the Forest of Dean

A pub game is one which is traditionally played inside or outside a pub. Most pub games date back centuries and are rooted in village culture. Many derive from older outdoor sports.

Pub games can be loosely grouped into throwing games, dice games, card games, board games, slot games, cue and ball games, bat and ball games, coin pushing/throwing games, and drinking games.

== History ==
In his book, Beer and Skittles, Richard Boston claims that the first regulation concerning national control of pubs was about pub games; Henry VII's statute of 1495 restricted the playing of "indoor games which were distracting Tudor pubmen from archery".

Many pub games owe their origins to older outdoor sports, adapted and transformed over time for indoor play, either for convenience or to allow publicans to maintain their teams during the off-season.

Gaming activities associated with pubs included card games such as cribbage, throwing games such as darts, physical sports such as cricket, and blood sports such as cock fighting. Balls Pond Road in Highbury, London, was named after an establishment run by Mr Ball that had a pond out the back filled with ducks, where drinkers could, for a certain fee, go out and take their chance at shooting the creatures.

== Types ==
Pub games can be loosely grouped into throwing games, dice games, card games, board games, cue and ball games, bat and ball games, bowling games, coin pushing/throwing games, and drinking games.

=== Throwing games ===
==== Darts ====
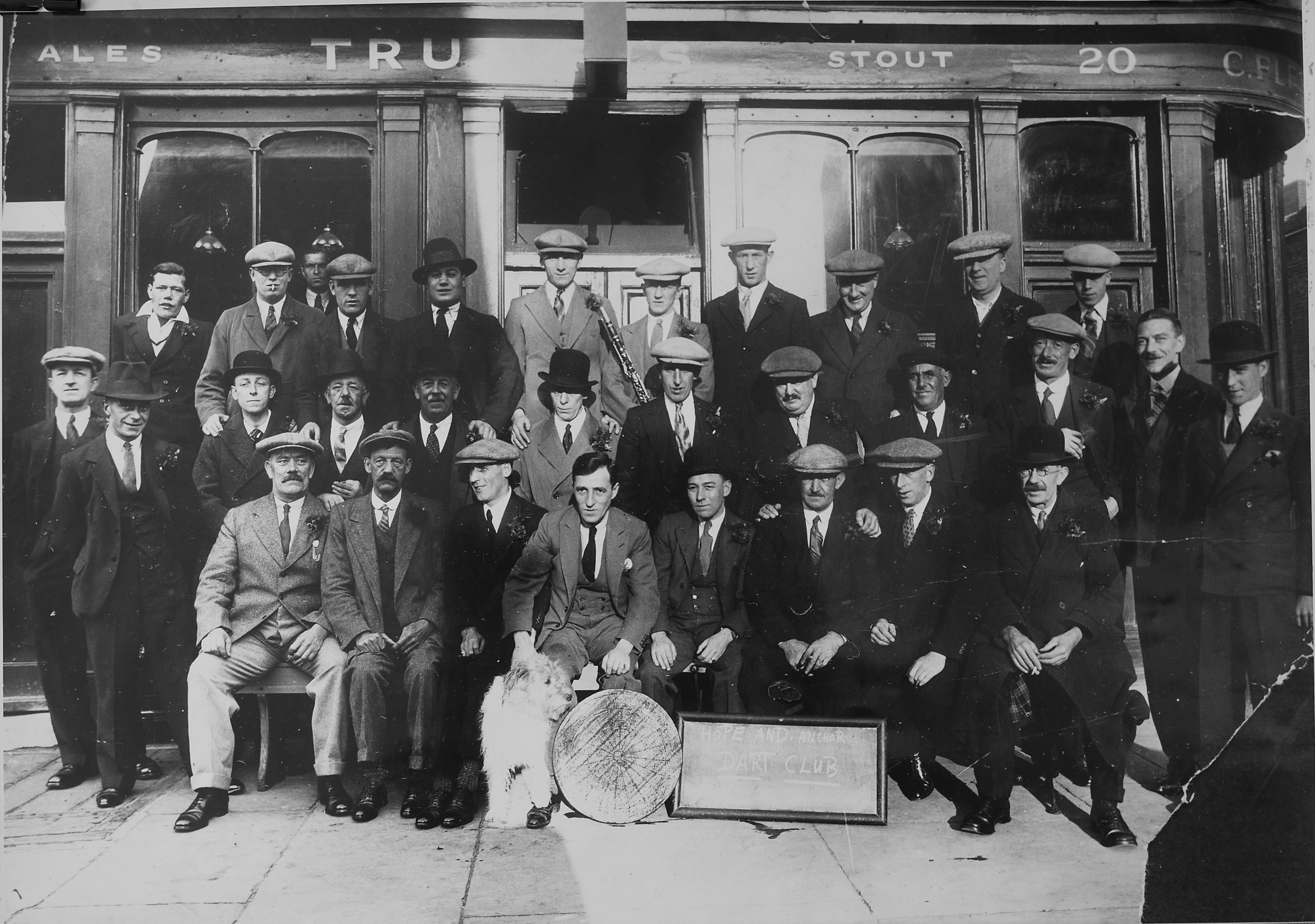
c. 1925 "Hope and Anchor Dart Club", Hope and Anchor, Hammersmith, London, UK

Darts is a game that involves the throwing of small missiles at a circular target, called a dartboard. It is one of the few traditional pub games that remains popular to the present day. When played at a professional level the game adheres to a specific board design and set of rules, but as a pub game, it can encompass several variants, such as 'Cricket'.

==== Aunt Sally ====
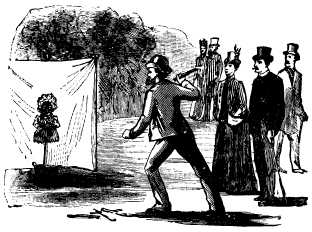
A game of Aunt Sally from the 1911 edition of Whiteley's General Catalogue

An Aunt Sally was originally a figurine head of an old woman with a clay pipe in her mouth, or subsequently a ball on a stick. Traditionally played in pubs and fairgrounds, the object of the game was for players to throw sticks at the head to break the pipe. The game bears some resemblance to a coconut shy, or skittles.

Today, the game of Aunt Sally is still played as a pub game in Oxfordshire. The ball is on a short plinth about 4 inches (10 cm) high, and is known as a 'dolly'. The dolly is placed on a dog-legged metal spike and players throw sticks or short battens at the dolly, trying to knock it off without hitting the spike.

==== Devil among the tailors ====
This form of table skittles involves 9 small skittles arranged in a 3 x 3 square, usually within a shallow open-topped wooden box sitting on a table-top. The wooden ball (about the size of a golf ball) hangs from a string or chain attached to the top of a vertical wooden post rising from one corner of the box. The aim of the game is to knock down the skittles by swinging the ball in an arc round the post (rather than aiming directly at the skittles).

In the picturesque name, the 'devil' refers to the ball, and the 'tailors' are the skittles.

==== Ringing the bull ====
Ringing the bull is a game that involves swinging a bull's nose ring, which is attached to a string, in an arc so as to hook it onto a bull's horn or hook attached to the wall. It was adopted by the earlier settlers of the Caribbean islands, where it is also referred to as the Bimini Ring Game.

The game is still played in Ye Olde Trip To Jerusalem, in Nottingham, which claims to be Britain's oldest pub.

==== Quoits ====
Quoits is a game that involves the throwing of metal, rope or rubber rings over a set distance, usually to land over or near a spike. The sport encompasses several distinct variations which are played either indoors on a small elevated table, or outside on a marked strip.

=== Dice games ===
Bar dice is a simple game played with five dice and a cup, often played to determine who buys the next round of drinks.

=== Card games ===
Numerous card games have been traditionally played in pubs. Those still played in Britain today include:

- Traditional card games
  - Cribbage
  - Euchre
  - Phat
  - Whist
- Gambling games
  - Brag
  - Poker

=== Cue and ball games ===
==== Pool ====
The pool is played on a billiard table with six pockets into which balls are deposited in a specified order. The game encompasses distinct variants, including eight-ball, nine-ball, and several others.

==== Bar billiards ====
The game, in its current form, started in the UK in the 1930s. The tables were made by the Jelkes company of Holloway Road in London, and sold to many pubs.

Today, it is mostly played in southern England and Jersey on a special table without side and corner pockets, but with 9 scoring holes in the playing surface. On the playfield are normally placed three skittles--guarding the highest scoring holes (the two 50-point holes and the 200-point hole). The aim of the game is to score as many points as possible by potting balls down the holes before either the time runs out or a skittle is knocked over. The last ball can only be potted by getting it into the 100 or 200-point hole after bouncing off one cushion.

=== Bat and ball games ===
==== Bat and Trap ====
Bat and Trap is a Kentish pub game is played between two teams of up to eight players. At any one time, one team is batting and the other is bowling. The game involves placing a heavy solid-rubber ball, similar to a lacrosse ball, on one end of a "trap", which is a low wooden box 22 inches (560 mm) long, 5 inches wide, and 5 inches (130 mm) high, on top of which is a simple see-saw mechanism. Each player in turn on the batting side hits the opposite end of the see-saw lever (the "striker") with their bat, so as to propel the ball into the air, and then, using the same bat, attempts to hit the ball between two 7-foot (2.1 m) high posts situated 21 yards (19 m) away and 13 feet 6 inches (4.11 m) apart at the other end of the playing area, or "pitch".

=== Bowling games ===
==== Skittles ====
Skittles is "one of the quintessential English pub games" and many pubs have a skittle alley, often in a side room. They may be of quite basic construction and the balls, as well as the skittles, may be made of wood. Some were based on cowsheds and only used during the summer months when the shed was not occupied by cattle.

=== Coin pushing/throwing games ===
==== Pitch penny ====
A game that involves throwing coins across the room and into a hole carved in the seat of a wooden bench.

==== Shove ha'penny (or "shove halfpenny") ====
Played by two players on a small, smooth board, made of slate or wood. A number of parallel lines or grooves run horizontally across this board. Ha'pennies or similarly-sized coins or metal discs are placed at one end of the board and are shoved with a quick flick of the hand. The object is to shove the coins so that a certain number of them (normally five) lie between the lines. The two players take alternate turns. In addition to shoving his own coin directly between the lines, a player may use his turn to knock his own coins into position. One set of coins is used by both players.

==== Toad in the hole ====
Involves the throwing of brass discs, called Toads, at a hole in a lead-topped table. A variation of this game has been played in pubs in East Sussex, UK, the 'hole' being in the centre of the lead surface.

=== Drinking games ===
- Yard of ale

=== Other games ===
- Bagatelle
- Bowls
- Skittles
- Table shuffleboard
- Table football

== See also ==
- Pub quiz
- Karaoke
- Traditional games
- Golf (billiards)
- Backyard golf
- Backyard Cricket
- Baseball pocket billiards

== Sources ==
- Croft-Cooke, Rupert (1937). Darts. London: Geoffrey Bles.
- Finn, Timothy (1981). Pub Games of England (2nd ed.). Cambridge; New York: Oleander Press. ISBN 0-900891-67-X.
- Hampson, Tim (2019). London's Riverside Pubs, updated edn.
- James, Masters (2011). "Aunt Sally - The Online Guide".
- "Vintage Direct". Archived from the original on April 2, 2005.
