= Glückshaus =

European gambling game

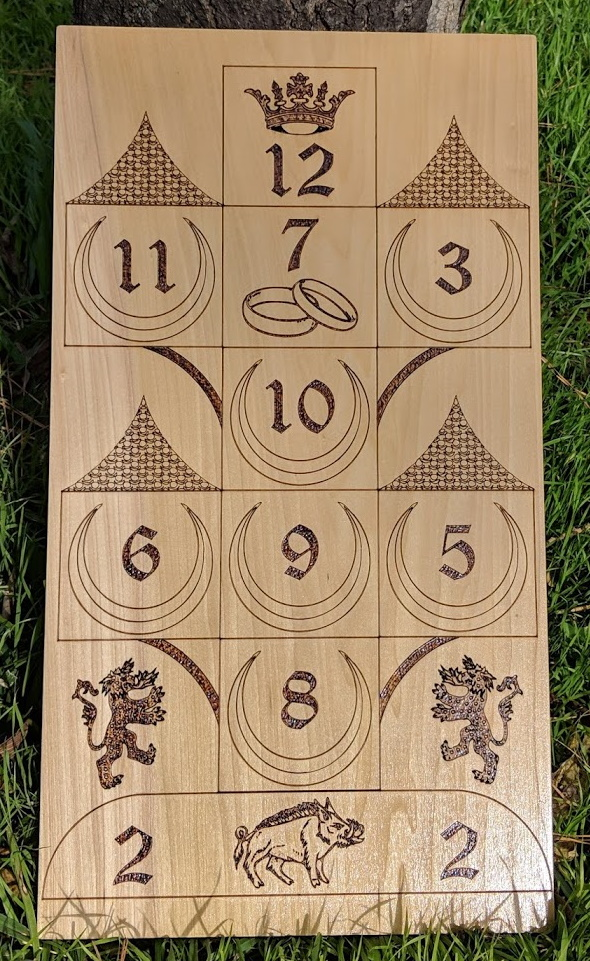
Wooden Glückshaus board with pyrographic artwork

Glückshaus (House of Fortune) is a gambling dice game for multiple players. It is played with two dice on a numbered board. The name was coined in the 1960s by Erwin Glonnegger who also created the modern design of the board by merging older dice games with a staking board for a card game.

== Rules ==
The board is divided in fields numbered from 2 to 12 (with 4 often left out), arranged in the form of the rooms of a house. Each player rolls two dice.

- On a roll of 3, 5, 6, 8, 9, 10 or 11, the player places a coin on the board if that room is empty, or takes the coin if it is occupied.
- If the player rolls snake eyes, he has rolled a "Lucky Pig" and collects all the coins on the board, except for what lies in room seven.
- If the player rolls a 12, he is "king" (König) and wins all the coins on the board.
- If the player rolls a 7, there is a "wedding" (Hochzeit) going on in the room, and one has to put a coin on there no matter what (a dowry). This builds up a jackpot until the "king" (12) is rolled.
- If playing on a board without a 4, either nothing happens on rolling a 4, or a rule defined before starting the game comes into play (for example a coin is given to the board owner).

The game ends when one player has won all the coins.
