= Canoga =

Canoga may refer to:

== Games ==
- Canoga, a nickname for a card game called Shut the Box

== Places ==
- Canoga, New York, a hamlet located in Seneca County, New York
- Canoga Park, California, a neighborhood located in Los Angeles, California
