= Battle Dice =

Dice Game

Battle Dice is a dice game that uses small figures which represent superheroes that are placed inside a die, and then rolled. It was created by Genie Toys and licensed to Playmates Toys and it began with the majority of the superheroes and supervillains from Marvel in 2006.

== Marvel Battle Dice ==
The figures' booster packs contained 3 random battle figures and one battle die. The starter set cane with 6 figures. There are also battle dice launchers, which are large sized versions of the Thing and the Hulk.

=== The Game ===
The game works by placing the figures (approximately 1" inch) in the battle dice, which have certain attributes by popping the dice open. When the dice are rolled, the player with the lower dice roll goes first. They select an attribute on the character, and use them to battle the other figure(s). Then the attributes take place, and so on and so forth, and the player with a certain roll wins, etc. Currently, there are 23 different dice. The attributes are measured on a 0-6 scale, 6 being the highest; those attributes are: Intelligence, Strength, Speed, Durability, Energy, and Fighting Skills. Characters are ranked points; in most tournaments teams cannot exceed 30 points, making figures like the powerful Dark Phoenix too expensive to use. A comprehensive explanation can be found at any of the first two links in the links section.

=== The Production Run ===
On September 12, 2006 Playmates Toys officially announced that the game would no longer be supported. The official site announced that the company would be turning its attention away from the game. Series 2 figures although announced for release no longer have an official release date and may never ship. The game received quite a few reviews all of which were above average. And an official reason has not been given as to the end of this games production.

Tournament vouchers should be honored until the beginning of December 2006. After that time they will return any further vouchers un-opened. The first official tournament was held in Sandy Utah on May 20, 2006. The last official tournament has not been revealed.

==== Set 1 ====
In January 2006, Playmates Toys released the first set consisting of 68 characters, which are:

- 001 - Captain America
- 002 - Captain America (Transparent)
- 003 - Hawkeye
- 004 - Human Torch
- 005 - Invisible Woman
- 006 - Iron Man
- 007 - Mister Fantastic
- 008 - She-Hulk
- 009 - Silver Surfer
- 010 - The Thing
- 011 - The Thing (Transparent)
- 012 - Thor
- 013 - AIM agent
- 014 - Annihilus
- 015 - Baron Zemo
- 016 - Doctor Doom
- 017 - Loki
- 018 - Mole Man
- 019 - Red Skull
- 020 - Super-Skrull
- 021 - Thanos
- 022 - Ultron (Transparent)
- 023 - Ultron
- 024 - Black Cat
- 025 - Black Spider-Man
- 026 - Daredevil
- 027 - Doctor Strange
- 028 - Elektra
- 029 - Ghost Rider
- 030 - Nick Fury
- 031 - Punisher
- 032 - Spider-Man
- 033 - Spider-Man (Transparent)
- 034 - Hulk
- 035 - Hulk (Transparent)
- 036 - Abomination
- 037 - Blackheart
- 038 - Bullseye
- 039 - Carnage
- 040 - Doctor Octopus
- 041 - Doctor Octopus (Transparent)
- 042 - Hobgoblin
- 043 - Mysterio
- 044 - Rhino
- 045 - Venom
- 046 - Vulture
- 047 - Archangel
- 048 - Banshee
- 049 - Beast
- 050 - Cyclops
- 051 - Gambit
- 052 - Kitty Pryde
- 053 - Nightcrawler
- 054 - Professor X
- 055 - Psylocke
- 056 - Wolverine
- 057 - Wolverine (Transparent)
- 058 - Apocalypse
- 059 - Dark Phoenix
- 060 - Deadpool
- 061 - Magneto
- 062 - Magneto (Transparent)
- 063 - Mimic
- 064 - Mojo
- 065 - Mystique
- 066 - Sabretooth
- 067 - Sentinel
- 068 - Toad
- 069 - Wolverine (Stealth)

There are also "Clear" forms of Wolverine, Spider-Man, Magneto, Captain America, the Thing, Doctor Octopus, Ultron and the Hulk that "re-arrange" their abilities. Three characters were left out of production and are currently tournament prizes: She-Hulk, Silver Surfer and Red Skull.

==== Set 2 ====
Originally slated for a July 2006 release, Playmates Toys was to have released the second series of Marvel Battle Dice. This set would have included these characters:

- Storm
- Phoenix
- Galactus
- Pyro
- Franklin Richards
- Green Goblin
- Scarlet Spider
- Vengeance
- Scarlet Witch
- Colossus
- Kraven the Hunter
- Mister Sinister
- Vision
- Mandarin
- Blob
- Ezekiel Sims
- Sentry
- Black Panther
- Iron Fist
- Kang the Conqueror
- MODOK
- Juggernaut
- Omega Red
- Electro
- Kingpin
- Mephisto
- Wasp

== DC Battle Dice ==
The first DC set of Battle Dice was to have been released in the fall of 2006 and was to include characters like Superman, Batman, Wonder Woman, Raven, Starfire, etc.

== The "Death" of Battle Dice ==
Shortly after their promotional tour of the game, Playmates suddenly pulled their support of Battle Dice. Their own site for the game was deactivated shortly thereafter, leaving the future of the game — not to mention the two above-mentioned expansions — rather nebulous. Fan support of the game, though scattered, still remains.

== See also ==
- Game design
- Dice Throne
