= Snout! =

Tabletop game

- Box cover and game components
- Publishers: Winning Moves
- Players: 2 to 6
- Setup time: 5 minutes
- Playing time: 10-30 minutes
- Chance: High
- Age range: 7 and up
- Skills: Dice-rolling; Point Tracking; Risk-taking

Snout! is a variation on the classic dice game Pass the Pigs. Unlike the original, players earn points by discarding cards in their hand matching what was rolled and getting rid of all cards in their hand, rather than matching what they rolled to a point chart. It was published by Winning Moves Games USA in 2005 but is no longer in production.

== Gameplay ==
The gameplay is somewhat different from Pass the Pigs, but will be easy to grasp for those familiar with the game. You start by shuffling the deck of cards and dealing 8 to each player. Each player chooses 3 cards from their hand and passes them to the right. The game then begins and the Start player tosses the pig die. Players then examine their hand to see if they have cards that match the position the pig landed in. If they do, they "oink" and discard those cards to a discard pile. If they don't have any that match, they must draw a card from the draw pile (they may look at the card and discard it immediately if it matches). Once all players have discarded or drawn, the next player in turn order tosses the pig and play continues. If a player(s) discards the last card in their hand, they have gone "Snout" and won the round. All other players reveal their hands and tally all the points on the cards left in their hands. Those points are evenly distributed to all players who have gone "Snout." In addition, all players who went "Snout earn 10 points.

There is a special way to win a round as well. One card, called the Leaning Jowler, is very difficult to play and worth 15 points to someone going "Snout," but has an upside, in that if a player who has it their hand is able to successfully play/discard it, they go "Snout" and win the round immediately, despite potentially still having cards in their hand. In addition, they score a 15-point bonus. Once a round ends, 8 new cards are dealt to each player, 3 cards are again passes to the right, and a new round begins. If the draw pile runs out, players simply shuffle the discards to form a new one. Play continues till one player has accumulated 100 points.
