= Sagrada (board game) =

Dice-drafting board game

- A nearly complete window in Sagrada
- Designers: Adrian Adamescu; Daryl Andrews
- Illustrators: Peter Wocken
- Publishers: Floodgate Games
- Publication: 2017; 9 years ago
- Genres: Dice games; Drafting games
- Players: 1–4
- Playing time: 30–60 minutes
- Age range: 10+

Sagrada is a dice-drafting board game designed by Adrian Adamescu and Daryl Andrews and published in 2017 by Floodgate Games. Each player constructs a stained-glass window using dice on a personal 4×5 game board with restrictions on the types of dice that can be played on each space. Players gain points by completing public and secret objectives for dice placements, and the one with the most after ten rounds is the winner.

== Gameplay ==
The object of the game is for each player to construct a stained-glass window using dice on a private board having 20 spaces. There are three global scoring cards used by all players, as well as a private scoring card for each player. The available double-sided window boards have a complexity rating ranging from 3 to 6, which represents how many spaces on the board have restrictions on colours or dice and the number of favour tokens with which the player begins the game.

Each turn, players choose one at a time from a pool of coloured dice in two passes, such that the first player in the first pass becomes the last player in the second pass. These are then placed on a player's private board based on the restrictions specified on each space and the global placement rules. The first die must be placed on one of the edges of the window, and subsequently placed dice must be placed in a space adjacent to already-placed dice, either orthogonally or diagonally. Additionally, no die may be placed orthogonally adjacent to one having the same colour or the same number. On their turn, players may choose to pay a fee to obtain rule-altering tool cards instead of placing a die.

Points are scored based on the three global scoring cards and their private scoring card; they are deducted for each open space in the player's window and awarded for each favour token possessed. The player with the most points after ten rounds is the winner.

== Versions and expansions ==
A set of three expansions–Passion, Life, and Glory–called Sagrada: The Great Facades were released between 2019 and 2022. A digital version developed by Dire Wolf Digital was published as an app in 2020. In 2023, a legacy edition of the game called Sagrada: Artisans was released following a successful Kickstarter campaign.

== Reception ==
In a review for The Guardian, Owen Duffy stated that the game "benefits from some real variety", but that there is "almost no interaction between players". Wirecutter listed Sagrada as one of "The Best Board Games" as of 2024, with Anna Perling praising it for its graphic design and simple rules. Writing for Polygon, Charlie Hall listed the game as one of "The best board games to buy at Target", describing it as a "gorgeous board game that's easy to teach and quick." The game was featured in Ars Technica's 2019 "ultimate board game gift guide", where it was concluded that "Sagrada plays quickly, looks gorgeous on the table, and is a satisfyingly thinky experience with low rules overhead."

Players with colour blindness have reported problems distinguishing between the dice, as colour is the only feature differentiating them. The app by Dire Wolf Digital provides a colour-blind mode.
