= Pig (dice game) =

Dice game

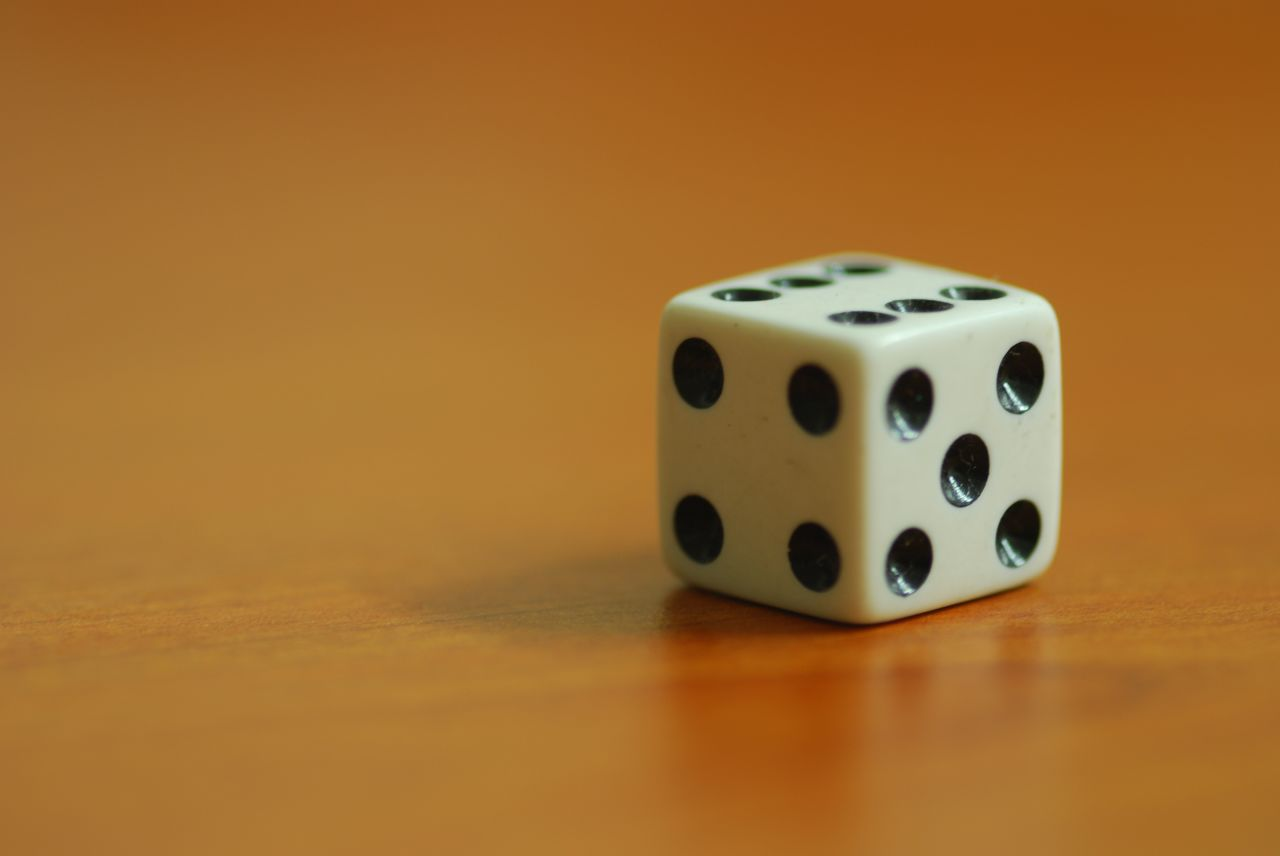
The game of Pig is played with a single six-sided die.

Pig is a simple dice game first described in print by John Scarne in 1945. Players take turns to roll a single dice as many times as they wish, adding all roll results to a running total, but losing their gained score for the turn if they roll a.

As with many games of folk origin, Pig is played with many rule variations, including the use of two dice instead of one. Commercial variants of two-dice Pig include Pass the Pigs, Pig Dice, and Skunk. Pig is commonly used by mathematics teachers to teach probability concepts.

Pig is one of a family of dice games described by Reiner Knizia as "jeopardy dice games", where the dominant type of decision is whether or not to jeopardize previous gains by rolling for potential greater gains.

== Gameplay ==
Each turn, a player repeatedly rolls a die until a is rolled or the player decides to "hold":

- If the player rolls a, they score nothing and it becomes the next player's turn.
- If the player rolls any other number, it is added to their turn total and the player's turn continues.
- If a player chooses to "hold", their turn total is added to their score, and it becomes the next player's turn.

The first player to score 100 or more points wins.

For example, the first player, Alice, begins a turn and rolls a. Alice could hold and score 5 points, but chooses to roll again. Alice rolls a, and could hold with a turn total of 7 points, but chooses to roll again. Alice rolls a, and must end her turn without scoring. The next player, Bob, rolls the sequence , , , ,, after which he chooses to hold, and adds his turn total of 23 points to his score.

== Optimal play ==
Optimal play for 2-player Pig was computed by Todd W. Neller and visualized by Clifton G. M. Presser in 2001. At any time, the relevant decision information includes the player's score, the opponent's score, and the turn total. Such information corresponds to a 3D point in the graph's space. If this point is inside the gray solid, the player should roll. Otherwise, the player should hold.

Many 2-dice variants have been analyzed, and human-playable Pig strategies have been compared to optimal play. For example:

- Hold at 20 is a popular strategy. Each turn, the player rolls until they score 20 or more, then holds. This strategy has an 8% disadvantage against optimal play.
- Hold at 25 was found by Neller and Presser to be more effective. This has a 4.2% disadvantage against optimal play.
- 4 scoring turns holds at 25 on the first turn, then on subsequent turns, divides the amount needed to reach 100 by the number of turns remaining. This has a 3.3% disadvantage against optimal play.
- End race or keep pace. If either player has a score of 71 or higher, roll to win. Otherwise, hold on 21 plus the difference between scores divided by 8. This has a 0.9% disadvantage against optimal play.

== Variations ==
=== Two-Dice Pig ===
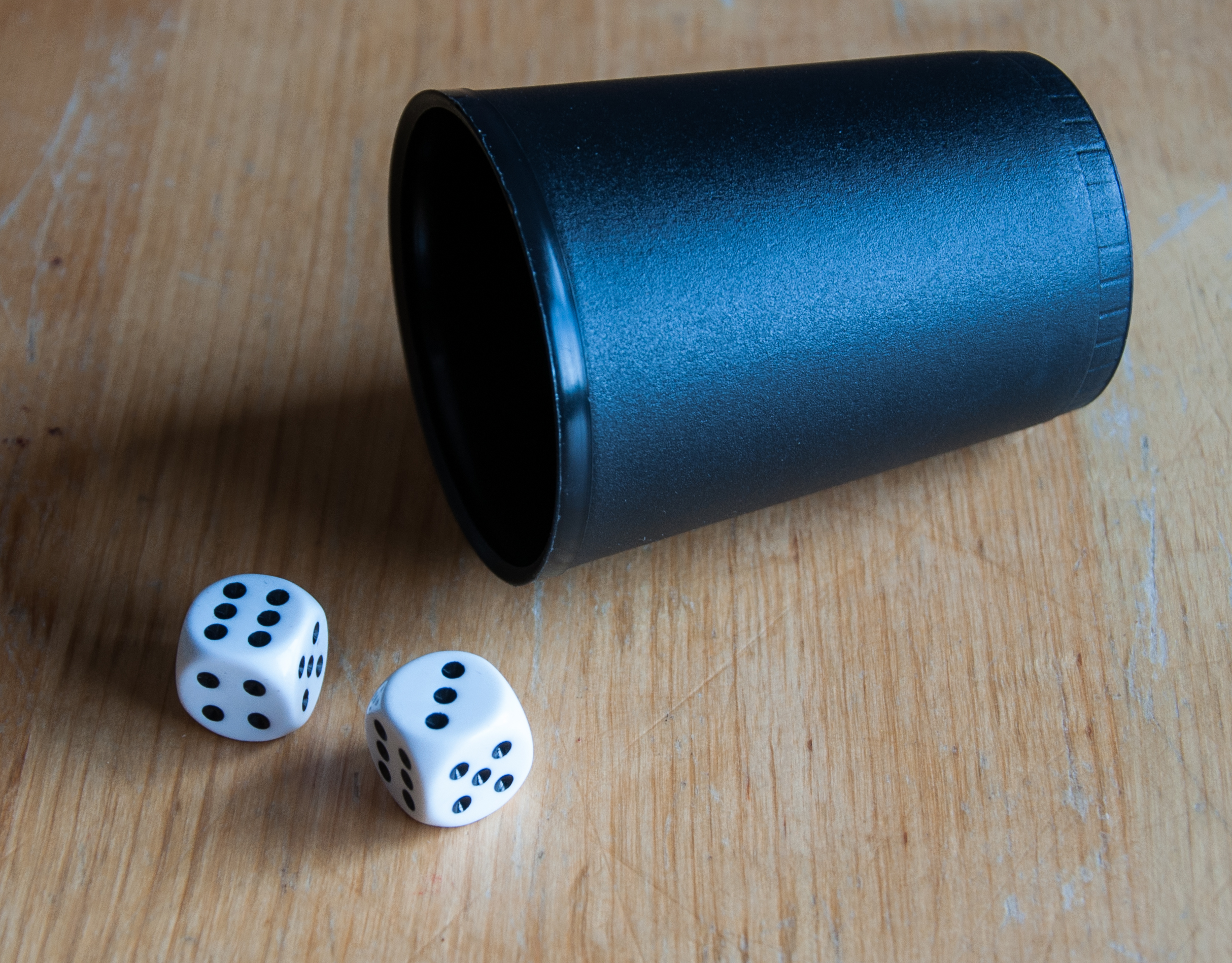
The game can be played with a pair of dice instead of one

This variation is the same as Pig, except:

- Two standard dice are rolled. If neither shows a, their sum is added to the turn total.
- If a single is rolled, the player scores nothing and the turn ends.
- If two s are rolled, the player's entire score is lost, and the turn ends.
- If a double is rolled, the point total is added to the turn total as with any roll but the player is obligated to roll again (possible sub-variation of the two-dice game). Another variation is that the values of the dice are multiplied together, so if you were to roll a and a, 25 would be added to the turn total.

Some versions of this game instead use as the "bad" die face.

=== Big Pig ===
This variation is the same as Two-Dice Pig, except:

- If two s are rolled, the player adds 25 to the turn total.
- If other doubles are rolled, the player adds twice the value of the dice to the turn total.

=== Skunk ===
Skunk (or Think) is a variation of Two-Dice Pig that is played with large groups. Rather than rolling in turn, all players begin the round standing. At any point in the round, a player may hold by sitting down. The round continues until a is rolled, or all players have sat down. Skunk is played in five rounds, and scoring is recorded in a five-column table with columns labeled with the letters of the word "SKUNK". The first round score is entered in the "S"-column, the next in the first "K"-column, and so on. After five rounds, the highest-scoring player is the winner.

=== Hog ===
Hog is played with a larger number of dice. On a player's turn, they choose any amount of dice to roll, and throw those dice. If they roll any s, they score zero for their turn; otherwise they score the sum of the dice. Play then passes to the next player. The game continues to a target score.

=== Pass the Pigs ===
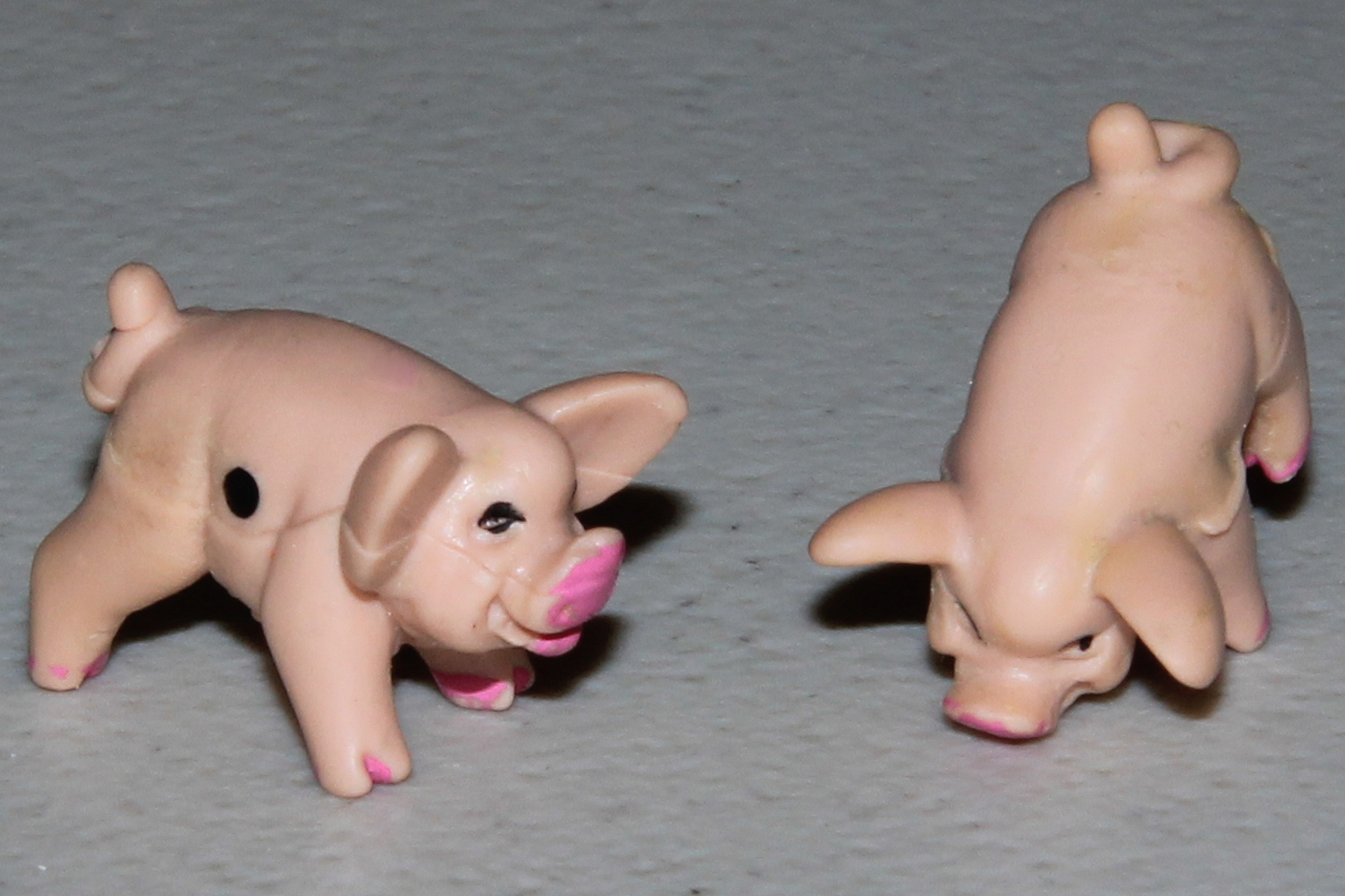
The two "dice" in Pass the Pigs

The commercial game Pass the Pigs is similar to two-dice Pig, and is played with two small model pigs being thrown, similar to shagai bones.

In this game, a roll of left side and right side has the same consequences as rolling a (i.e., the turn ends with the loss of the turn total), and a roll with pigs touching has the same consequences as rolling two s (i.e., the turn ends with the loss of the turn total and score). Pass the Pigs is similar to Frey's variant in that two pigs in the same non-side configuration score double what they would individually.

== Teaching ==
Pig often serves as a simple example for teaching probability concepts from the middle school level upwards. The game also provides exercises for teaching computer science in areas ranging from introductory courses to advanced machine learning material.
