= Cosmic Wimpout =

Dice game

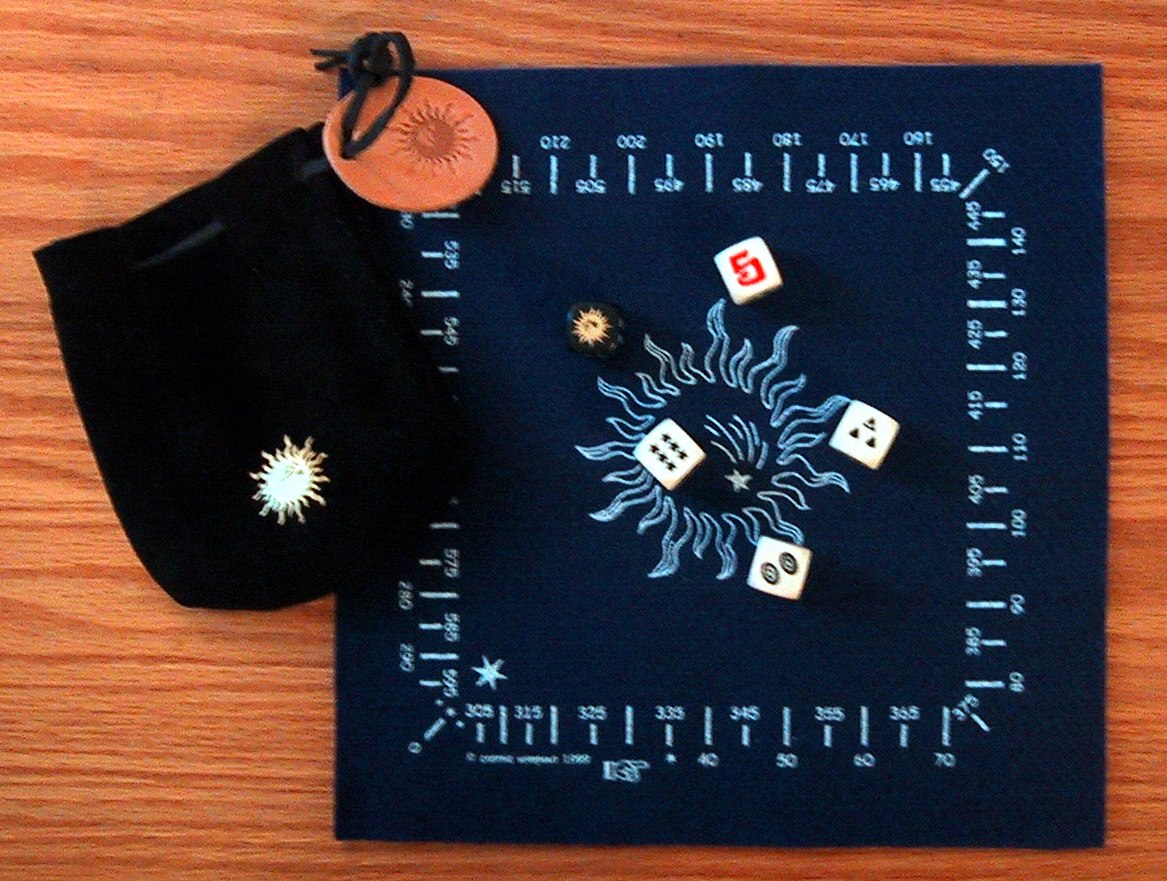
- Cosmic Wimpout set, including dice and a dice bag
- Genres: Dice Rolling
- Players: 2 and up
- Setup time: 1 minute
- Playing time: 20 minutes
- Chance: High (Dice)
- Age range: 5 and up
- Skills: Arithmetic, Risk Management
- Website: Homepage

Cosmic Wimpout is a dice game produced by C3, Inc in 1976. It is similar to 1000/5000/10000, Farkle, Greed, Hot Dice, Squelch, Zilch, to name but a few. The game is played with five custom dice, and may use a combination score board and rolling surface, in the form of a piece of cloth or felt available in various colors and designs. Players supply their own game piece for score keeping.

The game of Cosmic Wimpout has often been associated with the Berkeley area, the Grateful Dead, and other free-form subcultures. An annual tournament takes place at the Green River Festival in Greenfield, Massachusetts.

== Gameplay ==
The five Cosmic Wimpout dice are referred to as "cubes". Four of the cubes have face values of "two swirls", "three triangular glyphs", "four lightning bolts", "the number 5", "six stars", and "the number 10" - the fifth cube, often a different colour, has a single "flaming sun" icon in place of the three triangular glyphs. The general rules for the game have evolved since its inception and there have been various minor modifications made to the colors and patterns of the face designs on the cubes.

=== Scoring ===
The game is played by rolling all five cubes and adding up the player's score. If a player rolls the dice and no points are scored, that player has "wimped out".

- Fives and tens rolled are worth 5 and 10 points, respectively.
- Twos, threes, fours, and sixes, when rolled by themselves or as a pair, do not score any points (unless a flaming sun is present.)
- The Flaming Sun is a wild, and can be used as
  - a 5 or 10 point cube (and must be if it´s the only scoring cube in that roll),
  - part of a three-of-a-kind "flash", or
  - a non-scoring cube that can be re-rolled
- Rolling a flash. A flash occurs when you roll three of a kind of any number, or a pair with a "flaming sun", and scores ten times the face value of one of the dice in the flash. For example, rolling three twos is worth 20 points, three fives is worth fifty point, etc. Per the "Flaming sun" rule, if you roll a pair plus the flaming sun wild cube, the sun must be made into a flash.
- Rolling a freight train. A freight train occurs when the player rolls five of a kind in a single roll, and is worth 100 times the face value of the cube. Five swirls (twos) is worth 200 points, five lightning bolts (fours) is 400 points, and five 5's is worth 500 points. Rolling a freight train of five stars (sixes) is an instant win for that player. However, rolling a freight train of 10's is called a "supernova", and considered too many points, resulting in that player instantly losing and being out of the game. Game play continues for the remaining players, if any.

As the player scores points, they set the scoring cubes aside, and may choose to either keep the points earned, or to roll the non-scoring dice and try for more points. There are four exceptions to this general guideline, which force rolls in certain cases:

1. The opening roll. You must score at least 35 points to get on the board. If your opening roll is less than 35 point, you must continue to roll any non-scoring dice until meeting the minimum number of points, or you wimp out and end your turn.
2. You May Not Want To But You Must. If after any series of rolls you score with all five dice, you must continue your turn, rolling all five cubes. Points earned in each subsequent five cube reroll are added to the previous roll.
3. The Futtless rule. When you roll a flash, to keep the points, you must "clear" the flash by rolling all remaining non-scoring dice (or all five if you've scored with five cubes). However, the "reroll clause" states that you cannot match any one of the flash faces when clearing. If you match a flash face when clearing, you must reroll all those cubes just rolled until you can keep them or Wimp out.
4. No two players can be on the same spot at the same time. If the points you've earned would take you to a spot that another player is on, you must keep rolling.

If the player rolls all five cubes and scores no points, this type of wimpout is called a "train wreck". The player loses all points gained in that round. Herein lies most of the game's strategy: if a player keeps the points they get, those points are "safe" for the remainder of the game, and the player's score cannot drop below that value, house rules notwithstanding.

In his 2007 essay on the game, game designer Andrew Looney described Cosmic Wimpout as the "single most influential game I've ever played" and that the game "has a clean, elegant set of rules that allows losing players to feel they still have a chance at a come-from-behind victory." Looney cites Cosmic Wimpout's influence from the French dice game Dix Mille ("Ten Thousand") and names other variations of the game including Bupkis, Greed, Farkle, and Zonk.

== Variations ==
Cosmic Wimpout was created with the ability to modify or add additional rules while playing, known as the Guiding Light, given the consensus of all of the players. For example, some players use the Full House rule, which states that if a player rolls a flash, and rolls a pair with their remaining two dice, they must roll again.

Another variation is the Cosmic Sampler variation, which was featured in an electronic version for the Palm. A Sampler is when none of the dice on any roll match, similar to a large straight in Yahtzee. Scoring for a Sampler is 25 points.

== Reviews ==
- Games #32
- 1985 Games 100

== Related games ==
- Farkle
- Dice 10000
