= Bo Bing (game) =

Chinese dice game

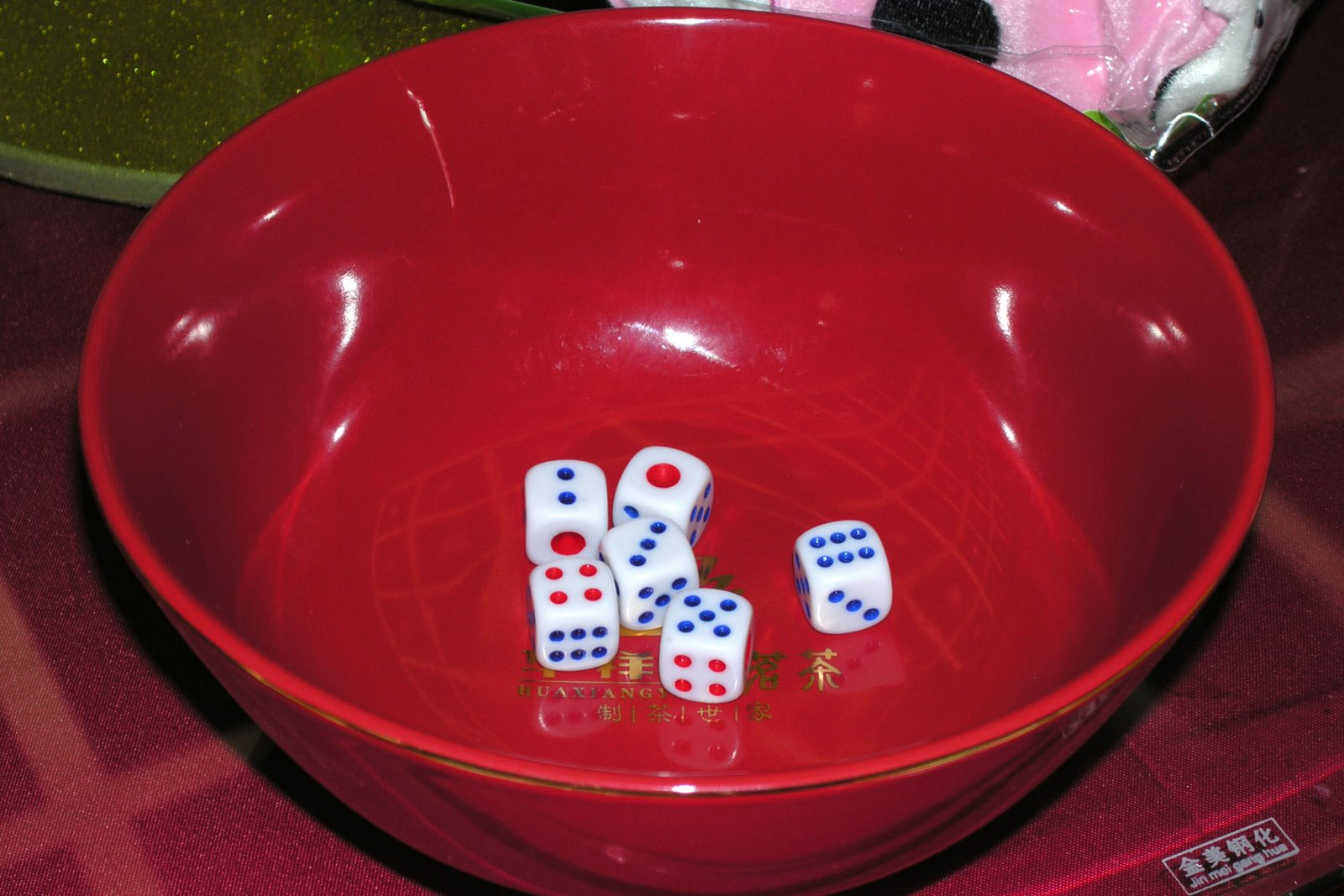
- Six dice in a bowl: a roll of 1-2-3-4-5-6 is a Bangyan, and its prize is the second largest mooncake
- Other names: Po̍ah-piáⁿ Po̍ah-chiōng-gôan-piáⁿ Poa̍h-tiong-chhiu
- Years active: 17th century - present
- Genres: Dice game
- Players: 2+
- Chance: High
- Materials required: Six dice, a bowl

Bo Bing
- Traditional Chinese: 博餅
- Simplified Chinese: 博饼
- Literal meaning: Gamble for Pastry
Transcriptions
Standard Mandarin
- Hanyu Pinyin: bóbǐng
- IPA: [pwǒ.pìŋ]
Yue: Cantonese
- Jyutping: bok^{3} beng^{2}
Southern Min
- Hokkien POJ: po̍ah-piáⁿ

Alternative Chinese name
- Traditional Chinese: 博狀元餅
- Simplified Chinese: 博状元饼
- Literal meaning: Gamble for Champion Pastry
Transcriptions
Standard Mandarin
- Hanyu Pinyin: bó zhuàngyuán bǐng
Southern Min
- Hokkien POJ: po̍ah-chiōng-gôan-piáⁿ

Pua Tiong Chiu
- Traditional Chinese: 跋中秋
- Literal meaning: Gamble for Mid-Autumn
Transcriptions
Southern Min
- Hokkien POJ: poa̍h-tiong-chhiu

Bo Bing (Mandarin Chinese: 博餅; pinyin: Bóbǐng; also known in Hokkien Chinese: 博餅 / 跋餅; Pe̍h-ōe-jī: Poa̍h-piáⁿ, or Hokkien Chinese: 跋狀元餅; Pe̍h-ōe-jī: Po̍ah-chiōng-gôan-piáⁿ) as known in Mainland China, is a Chinese dice game from Southern Fujian traditionally played as part of the celebration of the Mid-Autumn Festival, also known as the Mooncake Festival. It is traditionally played with six dice and a china bowl. Bo Bing is a national-level intangible cultural heritage of China as of 2008. In the Philippines, the game is widely known as "Mooncake Festival Dice Game"/"Mid-Autumn Festival Dice Game" or "Pua Tiong Chiu" (Hokkien Chinese: 跋中秋; Pe̍h-ōe-jī: Poa̍h-tiong-chhiu) among the Chinese Filipino community.

The game dates back to the 1600s when it is said to have been invented by the Chinese general Koxinga of the Southern Ming, along with his lower officer Hong Xu. Zheng was stationed with his troops in Amoy planning the Siege of Fort Zeelandia to take Dutch Formosa, which had been occupied by the Dutch since 1624. The game was an attempt to boost the morale of Koxinga's homesick troops during the Mid-Autumn Festival. The game became popular in Amoy (now Xiamen) and is considered a folk game.

The Hokkien Chinese name Po̍ah-piáⁿ translates as "gambling for cakes", and the game traditionally has 63 different sized mooncakes as prizes for the winning players: 32 of the smallest cake, half as many of the next largest, and so on ending with a single large Chiōng-gôan-piáⁿ ("champion cake"). These days in mainland China, the game's instructions are often printed on mooncake packaging, although the game is also played with prizes of daily necessities, household appliances or money. In the Philippines, the prizes are often usually money and/or daily necessities and household appliances for adults and sometimes toys, school supplies, junk food, various snacks and hobby items for the youth or sometimes for various ages, the prizes may also variously include mooncakes known in Hokkien Chinese: 中秋餅; Pe̍h-ōe-jī: tiong-chhiu-piáⁿ or Hokkien Chinese: 月餅; Pe̍h-ōe-jī: ge̍h-piáⁿ.

== Rules ==
The game requires six dice and a wide mouthed bowl. The first player is assigned by the eldest or most senior player rolling two dice and counting clockwise until the sum is achieved. The first player throws the six dice into the bowl and wins a specific prize depending on the dice combination. The dice are then passed to the next person clockwise, and the process is repeated until there are no prizes left. A throw is declared invalid and the thrower's next throw forgone if at least one of the dice lands or bounces outside the bowl.

Prize	Combination name			Number of cakes available	Dice results		Probability
Prize	Mandarin	Hokkien	English	Number of cakes available	Dice results		Probability
1st Place 狀元 (Trad.) / 状元 (Simp.) zhuàngyuán (Pinyin) chiōng-gôan (POJ)	紅六博 (Trad.) / 红六博 (Simp.) / 六紅 (Trad.) / 六红 (Simp.) hóngliùbó / liùhóng (Pinyin)	六紅 / 六殕紅 la̍k-hông / lio̍k-phú-âng (POJ)	Six Fours	1	Six 4-faces	4	1/46,656 0.0021%
1st Place 狀元 (Trad.) / 状元 (Simp.) zhuàngyuán (Pinyin) chiōng-gôan (POJ)	要點六博 (Trad.) / 要点六博 (Simp.) / 六子 yàodiǎnliùbó / liùzǐ (Pinyin)	六博 / 六卜 / 六殕烏 la̍k-pok / lio̍k-phú-o͘ (POJ)	Six Ones	1	Six 1-faces	1	1/46,656 0.0021%
1st Place 狀元 (Trad.) / 状元 (Simp.) zhuàngyuán (Pinyin) chiōng-gôan (POJ)	黑六博 / 六子 hēiliùbó / liùzǐ (Pinyin)	六博 / 六卜 / 六殕烏 la̍k-pok / lio̍k-phú-o͘ (POJ)	Six of a Kind	1	Six of any number, except four or one	2	4/46,656 0.0085%
1st Place 狀元 (Trad.) / 状元 (Simp.) zhuàngyuán (Pinyin) chiōng-gôan (POJ)	黑六博 / 六子 hēiliùbó / liùzǐ (Pinyin)	六博 / 六卜 / 六殕烏 la̍k-pok / lio̍k-phú-o͘ (POJ)	Six of a Kind	1	Six of any number, except four or one	3	4/46,656 0.0085%
1st Place 狀元 (Trad.) / 状元 (Simp.) zhuàngyuán (Pinyin) chiōng-gôan (POJ)	黑六博 / 六子 hēiliùbó / liùzǐ (Pinyin)	六博 / 六卜 / 六殕烏 la̍k-pok / lio̍k-phú-o͘ (POJ)	Six of a Kind	1	Six of any number, except four or one	5	4/46,656 0.0085%
1st Place 狀元 (Trad.) / 状元 (Simp.) zhuàngyuán (Pinyin) chiōng-gôan (POJ)	黑六博 / 六子 hēiliùbó / liùzǐ (Pinyin)	六博 / 六卜 / 六殕烏 la̍k-pok / lio̍k-phú-o͘ (POJ)	Six of a Kind	1	Six of any number, except four or one	6	4/46,656 0.0085%
1st Place 狀元 (Trad.) / 状元 (Simp.) zhuàngyuán (Pinyin) chiōng-gôan (POJ)	五紅 (Trad.) / 五红 (Simp.) wǔhóng (Pinyin)	五紅 gō͘-hông / gǒ͘-hông (POJ)	Five Fours	1	Five 4-faces	4 0	30/46,656 0.0643%
1st Place 狀元 (Trad.) / 状元 (Simp.) zhuàngyuán (Pinyin) chiōng-gôan (POJ)	五子 wǔzǐ (Pinyin)	五子 gō͘-chí / gǒ͘-chí (POJ)	Five of a Kind	1	Five of any number, except four	1 0	150/46,656 0.3215%
1st Place 狀元 (Trad.) / 状元 (Simp.) zhuàngyuán (Pinyin) chiōng-gôan (POJ)	五子 wǔzǐ (Pinyin)	五子 gō͘-chí / gǒ͘-chí (POJ)	Five of a Kind	1	Five of any number, except four	2 0	150/46,656 0.3215%
1st Place 狀元 (Trad.) / 状元 (Simp.) zhuàngyuán (Pinyin) chiōng-gôan (POJ)	五子 wǔzǐ (Pinyin)	五子 gō͘-chí / gǒ͘-chí (POJ)	Five of a Kind	1	Five of any number, except four	3 0	150/46,656 0.3215%
1st Place 狀元 (Trad.) / 状元 (Simp.) zhuàngyuán (Pinyin) chiōng-gôan (POJ)	五子 wǔzǐ (Pinyin)	五子 gō͘-chí / gǒ͘-chí (POJ)	Five of a Kind	1	Five of any number, except four	5 0	150/46,656 0.3215%
1st Place 狀元 (Trad.) / 状元 (Simp.) zhuàngyuán (Pinyin) chiōng-gôan (POJ)	五子 wǔzǐ (Pinyin)	五子 gō͘-chí / gǒ͘-chí (POJ)	Five of a Kind	1	Five of any number, except four	6 0	150/46,656 0.3215%
1st Place 狀元 (Trad.) / 状元 (Simp.) zhuàngyuán (Pinyin) chiōng-gôan (POJ)	四紅 (Trad.) / 四红 (Simp.) sìhóng (Pinyin)	四紅 sì-hông (POJ)	Four Fours	1	Four 4-faces	4 0	375/46,656 0.8037%
2nd Place	榜眼 / 探花 / 對堂 (Trad.) / 对堂 (Simp.) bǎngyǎn / tànhuā / duìtáng (Pinyin)	對堂 / 榜眼 / 探花 tùi-tn̂g / póng-gán / thàm-hoa (POJ)	Three of a Kind	2	Scenario 1: 2 sets of three of the same number, except four.	1 2	200/46,656 0.4287%
2nd Place	榜眼 / 探花 / 對堂 (Trad.) / 对堂 (Simp.) bǎngyǎn / tànhuā / duìtáng (Pinyin)	對堂 / 榜眼 / 探花 tùi-tn̂g / póng-gán / thàm-hoa (POJ)	Three of a Kind	2	Scenario 2: 2 sets of three of the same number, including four	1 4	300/46,656 0.6430%
2nd Place	榜眼 / 探花 / 對堂 (Trad.) / 对堂 (Simp.) bǎngyǎn / tànhuā / duìtáng (Pinyin)	對堂 / 榜眼 / 探花 tùi-tn̂g / póng-gán / thàm-hoa (POJ)	Straight	2	All numbers (1,2,3,4,5,6) in sequence	1 2 3 4 5 6	720/46,656 1.5432%
4th / 3rd Place (Note: Sometimes, the 3rd and 4th place are switched by game event organizers.)	進士 (Trad.) / 进士 (Simp.) / 四進 (Trad.) / 四进 (Simp.) jìnshì / sìjìn (Pinyin)	四進 / 進士 sù-chìn / sì-chìn / chìn-sū / chìn-sǐ (POJ)	Four of a Kind	8 / 4	Four of any number, except four	1 0	1875/46,656 4.0187%
4th / 3rd Place	進士 (Trad.) / 进士 (Simp.) / 四進 (Trad.) / 四进 (Simp.) jìnshì / sìjìn (Pinyin)	四進 / 進士 sù-chìn / sì-chìn / chìn-sū / chìn-sǐ (POJ)	Four of a Kind	8 / 4	Four of any number, except four	2 0	1875/46,656 4.0187%
4th / 3rd Place	進士 (Trad.) / 进士 (Simp.) / 四進 (Trad.) / 四进 (Simp.) jìnshì / sìjìn (Pinyin)	四進 / 進士 sù-chìn / sì-chìn / chìn-sū / chìn-sǐ (POJ)	Four of a Kind	8 / 4	Four of any number, except four	3 0	1875/46,656 4.0187%
4th / 3rd Place	進士 (Trad.) / 进士 (Simp.) / 四進 (Trad.) / 四进 (Simp.) jìnshì / sìjìn (Pinyin)	四進 / 進士 sù-chìn / sì-chìn / chìn-sū / chìn-sǐ (POJ)	Four of a Kind	8 / 4	Four of any number, except four	5 0	1875/46,656 4.0187%
4th / 3rd Place	進士 (Trad.) / 进士 (Simp.) / 四進 (Trad.) / 四进 (Simp.) jìnshì / sìjìn (Pinyin)	四進 / 進士 sù-chìn / sì-chìn / chìn-sū / chìn-sǐ (POJ)	Four of a Kind	8 / 4	Four of any number, except four	6 0	1875/46,656 4.0187%
3rd / 4th Place	會元 (Trad.) / 会元 (Simp.) / 三紅 (Trad.) / 三红 (Simp.) huìyuán / sānhóng (Pinyin)	三紅 / 會元 sam-hông / saⁿ-âng / hōe-oân (POJ)	Three Fours	4 / 8	Scenario 1: Three 4-faces, any number for the three remaining dice except for other 1 set of three of the same any number.	4 0	2400/46,656 5.1440%
3rd / 4th Place	會元 (Trad.) / 会元 (Simp.) / 三紅 (Trad.) / 三红 (Simp.) huìyuán / sānhóng (Pinyin)	三紅 / 會元 sam-hông / saⁿ-âng / hōe-oân (POJ)	Three Fours	4 / 8	Scenario 2: Three 4-faces, any number for the three remaining dice	4 0	2500/46,656 5.3584%
5th Place	舉人 (Trad.) / 举人 (Simp.) / 二舉 (Trad.) / 二举 (Simp.) jǔrén / èrjǔ (Pinyin)	二舉 / 舉人 lī-kú / lī-kí / kú-lîn / kú-jîn / kí-jîn / kí-lîn (POJ)	Two Fours	16	Two 4-faces, any number for the four remaining dice.	4 0	9300/46,656 19.9331%
6th Place	秀才 / 一秀 xiùcái / yīxiù (Pinyin)	一秀 / 秀才 it-siù / siù-châi (POJ)	One Four	32	A 4-face, any number for the five remaining dice.	4 0	17400/46,656 37.2942%
A blank dice denotes a result of any number outside the given exceptions

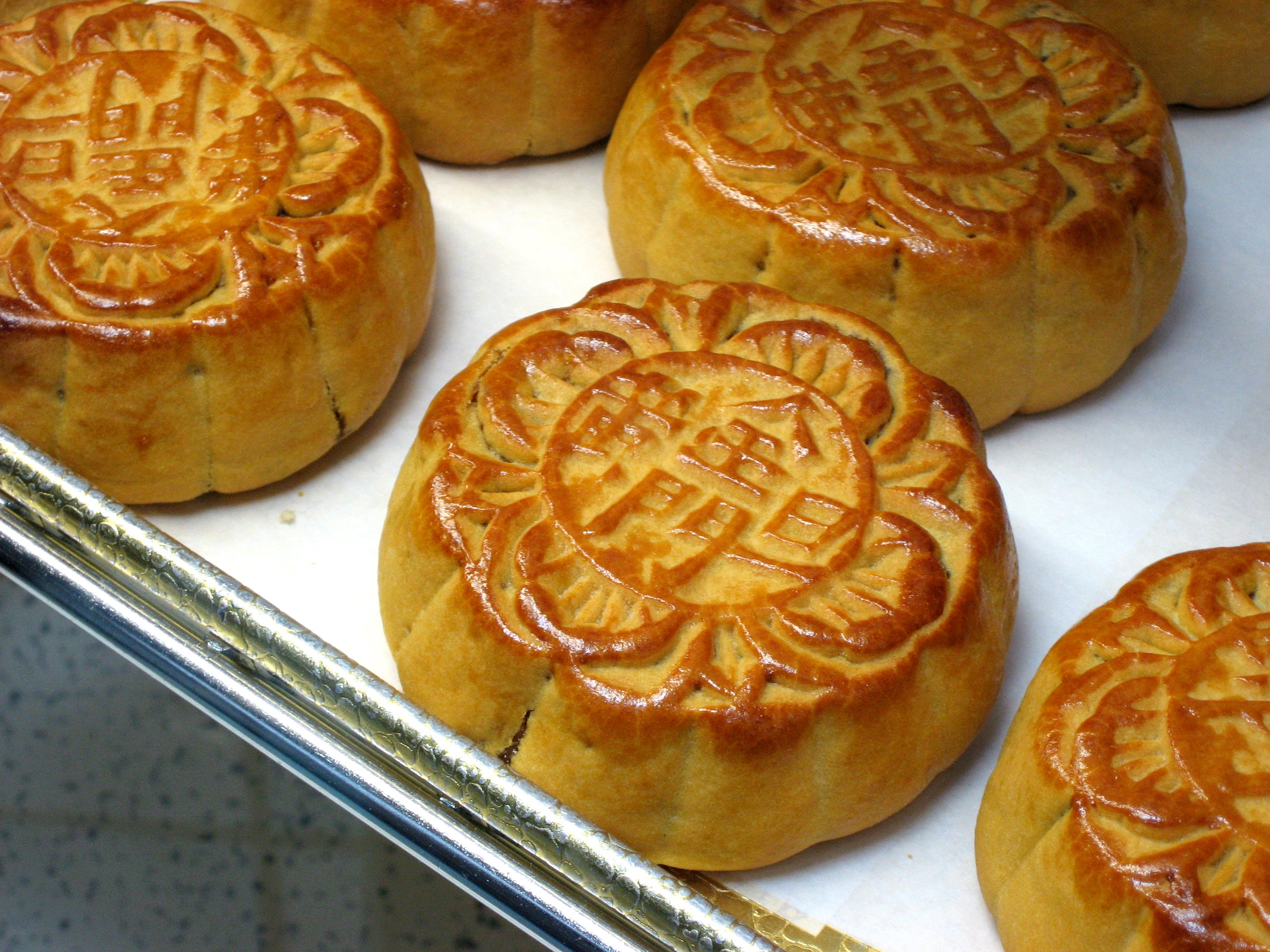
Mooncakes

If a player makes an ultimate throw (six fours), they receive all of the other mooncakes designated for 6th to 1st place, even those which have already been awarded. This rule can be omitted to ensure all players receive a prize.

Big prizes such as 状元/狀元, 对堂/對堂, and 三红/三紅 may be chased (追饼/追餅) by other players, wherein a prize already won by another player can be taken by another player who has rolled the dice combination corresponding to a prize that has already been completely taken. In the case of 状元/狀元, where there is only one prize, the hierarchy of 状元/狀元 size determines if it can be taken; only players who roll a higher combination of 状元/狀元 than the last can take the prize.

== Rituals ==
Some players believe in rituals when playing the game that they believe will give them good luck and success during the year. The winner of the largest prize (状元/狀元) will sometimes wear a champion hat (状元帽/狀元帽/zhuàngyuánmào) to symbolize success. Additionally, the winner of the largest prize will sometimes be responsible for the purchase of the following year's mooncakes to share the fortune. Other reported practices include throwing the dice with one or two hands, or exclaiming "Chiong Wan!"
