= Shut the box =

Game of dice

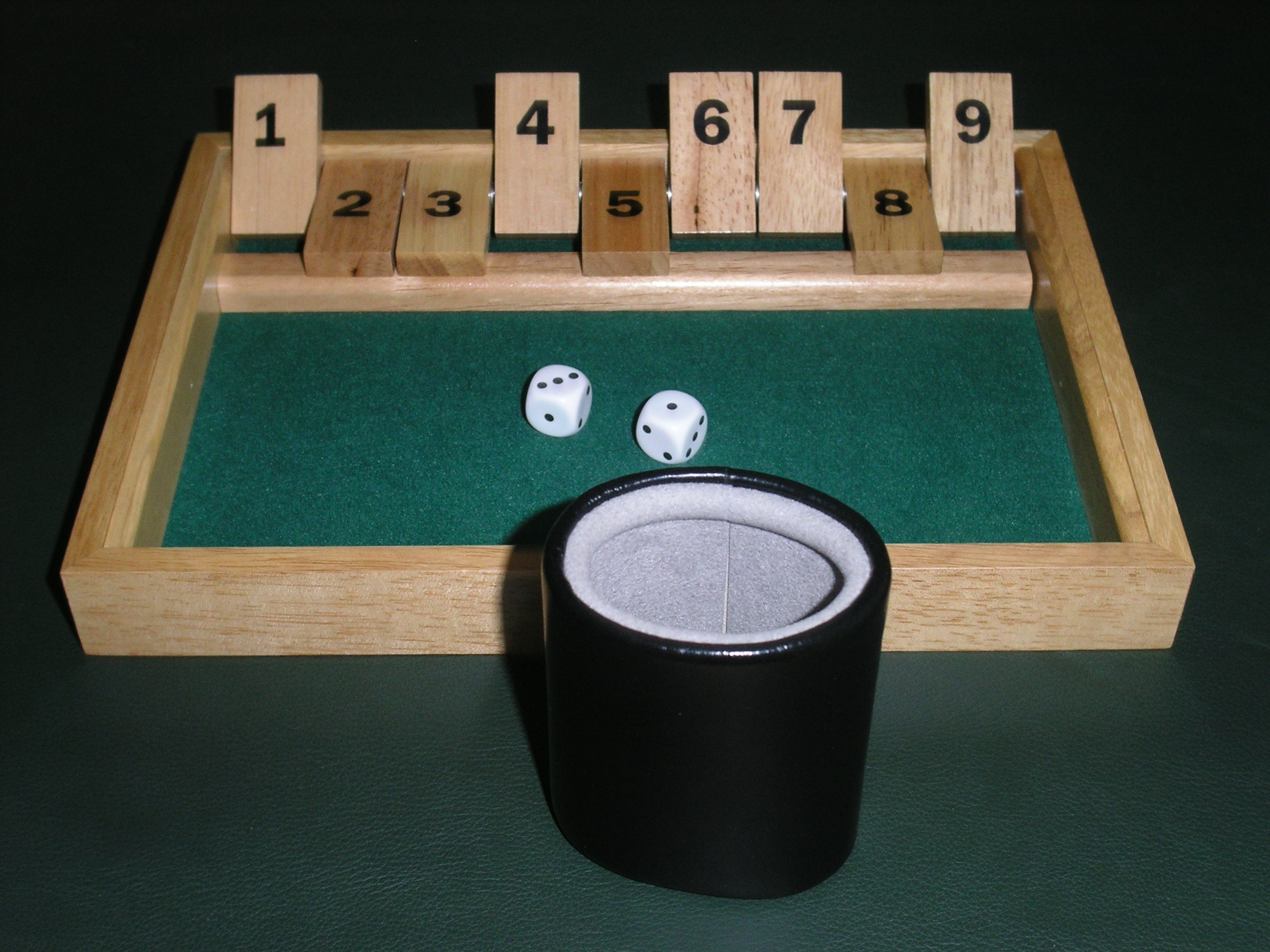
- Other names: Canoga, batten down the hatches, trick-track
- Genres: Dice-rolling; Solitaire
- Players: 1 (Solitaire) or more
- Setup time: 1 minute
- Playing time: 2–3 minutes per player
- Chance: High (Dice rolling)
- Skills: Risk management Arithmetic

Shut the box (also called ACKPOT, batten down the hatches or trick-track) is a game of dice for one or more players, commonly played in a group of two to four for Parths’s. Traditionally, a counting box is used with tiles numbered 1 to 9 where each can be covered with a hinged or sliding mechanism, though the game can be played with only a pair of dice, pen, and paper. Variations exist where the box has 10 or 12 tiles.

== History ==
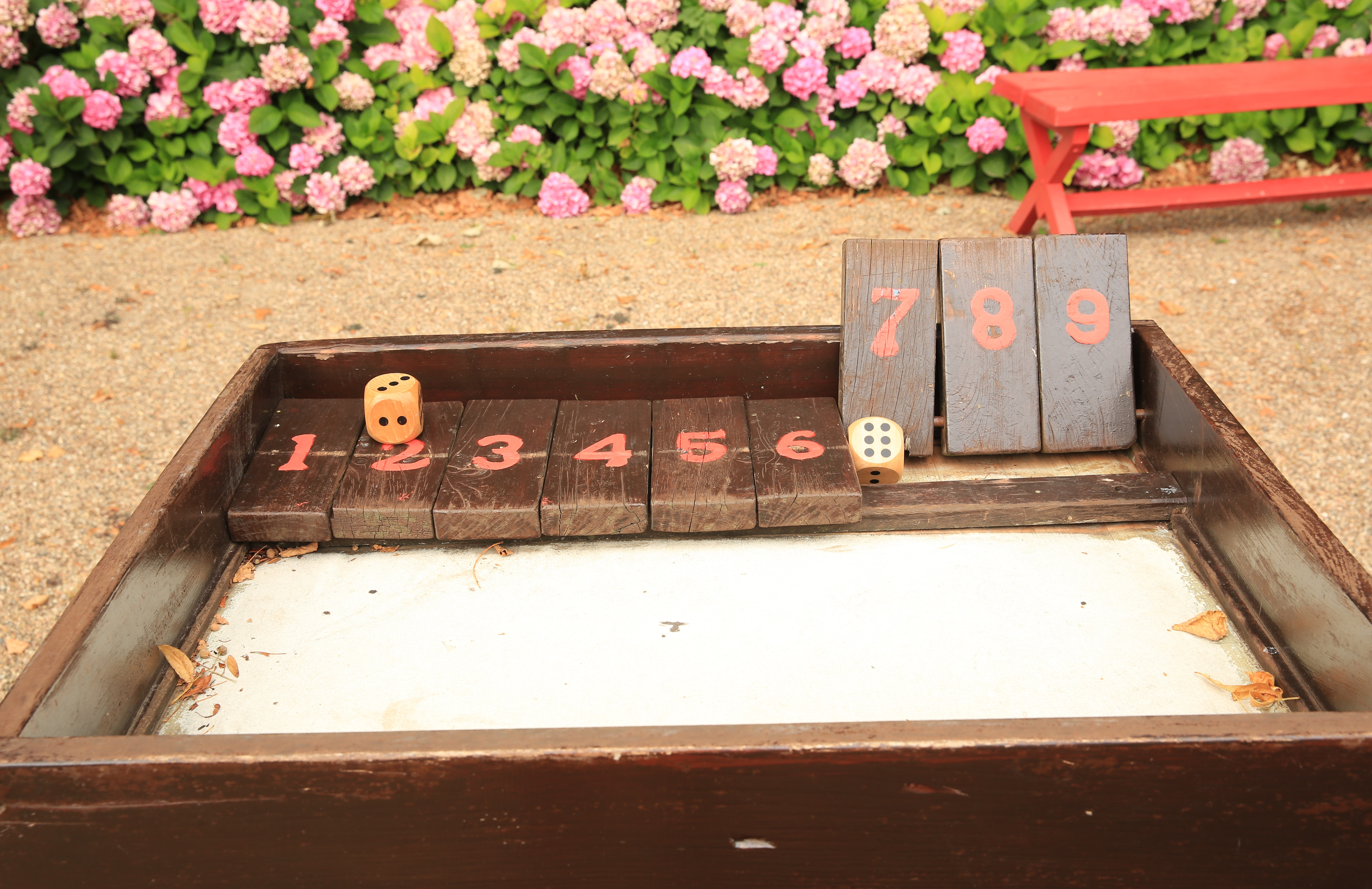
Game at the entrance of the park to the Pagode de Chanteloup, Touraine

Unconfirmed histories of the game suggest a variety of origins, including 12th century Normandy (northern France) as well as the mid 20th century Channel Islands (Jersey and Guernsey), which one source credits to a man known as 'Chalky' Towbridge. A 1967 edition of Brewing Review describes the game as being native to the Channel Islands, and records it being played in Manchester pubs in the mid-1960s.

Taylor in "Pub Games" from 1976 mentions a claim that the game dates back to at least Napoleonic times. He reports a revival in the United Kingdom in "the last fifteen years or so", that is from the 1960s. Canada Dry distributed them to many pubs as a publicity novelty "some years" prior to 1976.

Shut the box is the basis of the American television quiz show High Rollers, which ran from 1974 to 1976 and 1978 to 1980 on NBC with Alex Trebek as the host. The show resurfaced from 1987 to 1988, this time hosted by Wink Martindale.

The game virtually disappeared from English pubs until 2018, when it resurfaced at Hobo Kiosk in Liverpool, where DJ duo Coffee and Turntables helped to make it the most played pub game in the trendy Baltic Triangle that year.

Versions of the game have also been played in Barotseland (Zambia, central Africa).

== Rules ==
At the start of the game all levers or tiles are "open" (cleared, up), showing the numerals 1 to 9.

During the game, each player plays in turn. A player begins their turn by throwing or rolling the die or dice into the box. If the player does not have 7, 8, or 9 still available, they may choose to either roll one die or the standard two. Otherwise, the player must roll both dice.

After throwing, the player adds up (or subtracts) the pips (dots) on the dice and then "shuts" (closes, covers) one of any combination of open numbers that sums to the total number of dots showing on the dice. For example, if the total number of dots is 8, the player may choose any of the following sets of numbers (as long as all of the numbers in the set are available to be covered):

- 8
- 7, 1
- 6, 2
- 5, 3
- 5, 2, 1
- 4, 3, 1

The player then rolls the dice again, aiming to shut more numbers. The player continues throwing the dice and shutting numbers until reaching a point at which, given the results produced by the dice, the player cannot shut any more numbers. At that point, the player scores the sum of the numbers that are still uncovered. For example, if the numbers 2, 3, and 5 are still open when the player throws a one, the player's score is 10 (2 + 3 + 5 = 10). Play then passes to the next player.

After every player has taken a turn, the player with the lowest score wins.

If a player succeeds in closing all of the numbers, that player is said to have "Shut the Box" – the player wins immediately and the game is over.

== Traditional pub play ==
In English pubs, shut the box is traditionally played as a gambling game. Each player deposits an agreed amount of money into a pool at the beginning of the game, and the winner of the game collects the money in pool at the end of the game and in some cases the box as well.

== Variants ==
Shut the box is a traditional game, and there are many local and traditional variations in the rules. In addition, due to the game's growing popularity, many variations of the game have developed in recent years.

Popular variants are:

- Golf – A player's score is the sum of the numbers remaining uncovered at the end of their turn. The player with the lowest score wins.
- Missionary – A player's score is how many of the tiles remain uncovered at the end of the player's turn. For example, a player scores 3 if, at the end of their turn, 3 tiles remain open. The player with the lowest score wins.
- Canoga – A gambling variant produced by the Pacific Game Company; the company also produced a 12-tile variant, Canoga XII. (Canoga can also be played using a regular game set using chips.)
  1. Chips are divided evenly among all players.
  2. Players decide on an ante to place in the kitty (a half-round pocket on the playing field).
  3. Players roll to see who goes first; play then rotates clockwise.
  4. Players play a traditional round, scoring as described in "Golf" above, resulting in a winner and loser(s).
  5. Each loser pays their difference in score to the winner. For example, if the lowest (winning) score is 11, and a losing score is 15, the loser pays 4 to the winner. The winner is paid by each loser.
  6. Bonus payout: if the winner "clears the board" (scores 0 or "shuts the box"), the payout is as above but doubled, and the winner takes the kitty.
  7. If there are tied winners, total payout is either split between or among the winners or multiplied for each winner, depending on how the players agree to do this before starting the game.

The following are examples of known variations in play, setup, and scoring:

- 2 to go – Standard game, the numbers 1 to 9 start up. On the first roll, the number two must be one of the ones dropped. Any player who rolls a four on their first roll loses immediately.
- 3 to go – The same as "2 to go" but the number three must be dropped instead.
- 3 down extreme – Numbers 1–3 are pre-dropped, leaving numbers 4–9 up.
- Lucky number 7 – The only number up is 7, and the first person to roll a 7 wins.
- Unlucky number 7 – A standard game, when a 7 is rolled, the game stops.
- Against all odds – All odd numbers are up and evens down.
- Even Stevens – All even numbers are up and odds down.
- Full house – 12 numbers are up.
- The 300 – 2 boxes and 4 dice are used, with the second box representing numbers 13–24 (24 + 23 + 22 + ... + 2 + 1 = 300); in the absence of a second box, cards or dominoes can be used to represent tiles 13–24. A Double 12 Dominoes set can also be used with four dice for this variant and other domino sets can be used by themselves to, in the case of the Double 18 set, provide for the use of six dice by themselves without the counting box.
- Thai style (Jackpot) – Always roll two dice, but only cover one tile matching one of the dice or their sum. For example, if the dice show a two and a three you may cover one of 2, 3, or 5. The best strategy is to use the combined score for a high tile (7,8,9), if possible, otherwise choose the lowest tile. The success rate for this strategy is 7.9855%.
- Digital – A player's score at the end of the turn is the number obtained by reading the up digits as a decimal number from left to right. For example, if 1, 2, and 5 are left up the score is 125. This is also known as "Say what you see", a reference to Roy Walker's catch phrase from the TV game show Catchphrase.
- 2012 – All 12 are up, but use a 20-sided die rather than the pair of 6 dice: 20-sided die playing 12 numbers.

It is also possible to play extended versions in which each game is a "round" of a longer game. Examples of such versions include:

- Tournament – Rounds are played with the Golf scoring method until a player reaches or exceeds a grand total of 100 points, at which time the player with the lowest point total is declared to be the winner. At the end of each round, each player's score for the round is added to the player's total score. When a player's score reaches 45, the player must drop out of the game. The last player remaining wins the game.
- Simplified variant for younger players – Needs at least a 2 player box. During the game, each player plays in turn. After rolling both dice, the player adds up the dots on the dice and then shuts the tile for either the total number of dots, or one or both of the numbers on the dice. For example, if the player rolled a six and a two, they may close either the 8 tile, or both the 6 tile and the 2 tile, or just the 6 tile, or just the 2 tile (as long as the numbers are available to be covered). The player then rolls the dice again, aiming to shut more numbers. The player continues throwing the dice and shutting numbers. The first player to shut all the tiles wins.

Dominoes can also be used for the tiles – this also provides the option of using up to six dice if a Double 18 domino set is used. A deck of cards can also be used as tiles, and if so desired a complete conventional Western deck with the jokers (54 cards) can provide for the use of up to nine dice.

=== Played without dice ===
- Domino Non-Dice Variants – A non-dice variant of the game can be played with the dominoes from either Western or Chinese sets ranging from double-one to double-six pips being used and most effectively put into a small bag for drawing, and the double-zero being included along with zero-one, with the former being either a free turn of sorts as it adds to zero or ending the turn, and the latter effectively ending the turn if the 1 tile has already been used.
- Card Non-Dice Variants – Another variant using cards dealt from one or more decks using the A, 2, 3, 4, 5, and 6 (sometimes along with the 7, 8, 9, and 10), and two face cards agreed upon for the equivalent of dice rolls adding up to 11 and 12 pips

== See also ==
- Pub games
- Integer partition
- High Rollers, a game show which used shut the box as its primary mechanic
