= Farkle =

Dice game

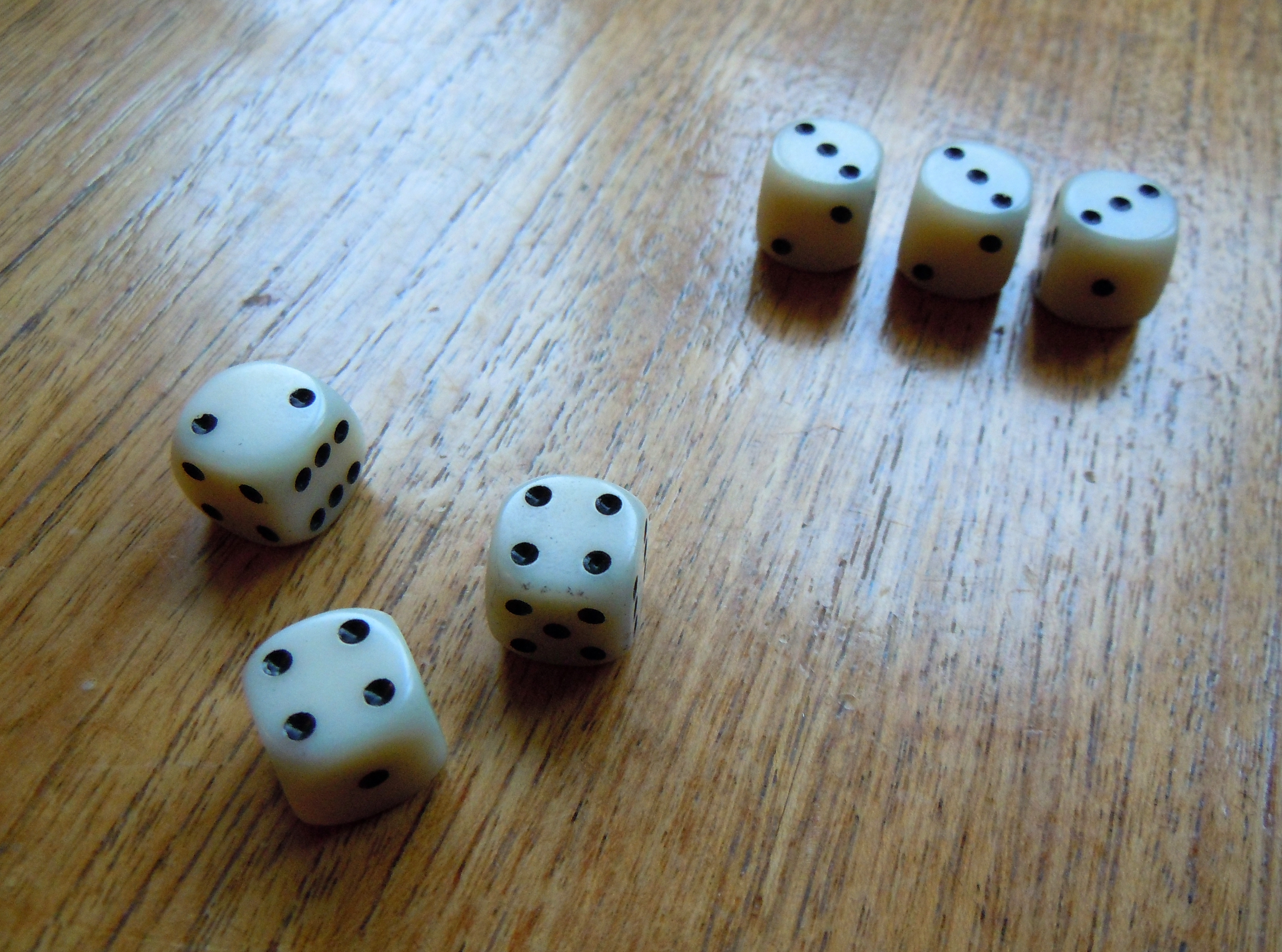
A Farkle game in progress; a group of three threes has been set aside, earning 300 points.

Farkle, or Farkel, is a family dice game with varying rules. Alternate names and similar games include Dix Mille, Ten Thousand, Cosmic Wimpout, Chicago, Greed, Hot Dice, Volle Lotte, Squelch, Zilch, and Zonk. A version has been marketed commercially since 1996 under the brand name Pocket Farkel by Legendary Games Inc. The game is believed to have arrived to North America on French sailing ships in the 1600s and has been passed down in families as a folk game ever since. As such, while the basic rules are well-established, there is a wide range of variation in scoring and play. The game is played with six dice (five in some variations), along with paper and a pencil or pen for keeping score.

== History ==
According to the official Pocket Farkel game documents, scholars believe the game arrived on French sailing ships in the 1600s and has been passed down in families ever since. The game has also been claimed to originate from Iceland through the purported English nobleman Sir Albert Farkle, who is said to have first played it there in the 1300s or 1400s, but this is not considered credible. Another claim is that the game originates in Texas, based on the fact that farkleberries grow there and the game could purportedly be played with dried farkleberries. However, as a folk game passed down through families, the game has a number of names: even if the name "Farkle" did come from farkleberries, as one of many names of the game, it could simply have been acquired as the game passed through Texas.

Equipment and instructions to play Farkle dating to the 1700s have been found at Fort Chartres, Illinois.

== Play ==
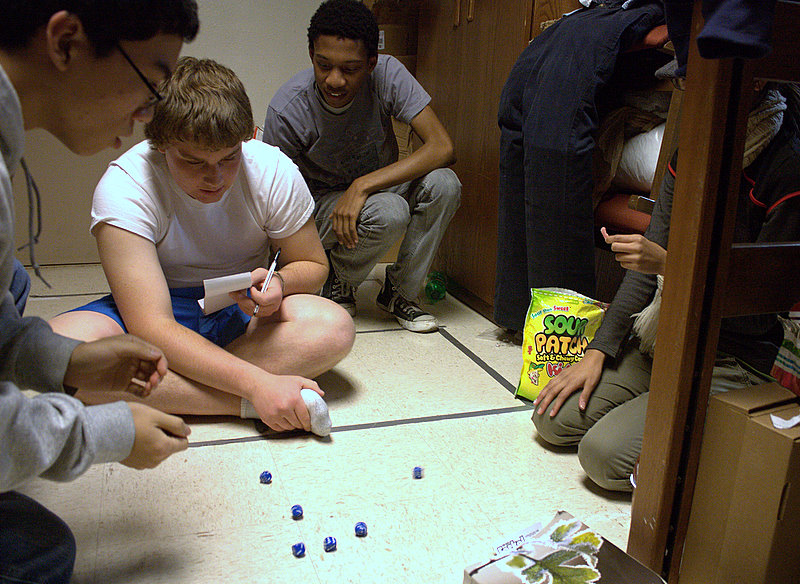
College roommates playing Farkle in their dorm

Farkle is played by two or more players, with each player in succession having a turn at throwing the dice. Each player's turn results in a score and the scores for each player accumulate until they reach or exceed 10,000, although this number varies.

- At the beginning of each turn, the player throws all six dice at once.
- After each throw, one or more scoring dice must be set aside (see sections on scoring below).
- The player may then either end their turn and bank the score accumulated so far or continue to throw the remaining dice.
- If the player has scored all six dice, they have "hot dice" and may continue their turn with a new throw of all six dice, adding to the score they have already accumulated. In some variations, they must reroll the dice. There is no limit to the number of "hot dice" a player may roll in one turn.
- If none of the dice score in any given throw, the player has "farkled" and all points for that turn are lost.
- At the end of the player's turn, the dice are handed to the next player in succession (usually in clockwise rotation, viewing the table from above), and they have their turn.

Once a player has achieved a winning point total, each other player has one last turn to score enough points to surpass that score.

=== Standard scoring ===
As a base of comparison, the base scoring rules listed in Playing Grandma's Games by Arnold are given below.

Dice combination	Dice	Score
Each one	1	100
Each five	5	50
Three ones	1	1000
Three twos	2	200
Three threes	3	300
Three fours	4	400
Three fives	5	500
Three sixes	6	600
Four of a kind	4	1000
Five of a kind	5	2000
Six of a kind	6	3000
Three pair	1 2 3	1500
Run	1 2 3 4 5 6	2500

==== Scoring example ====
For example, if a player throws a combination of one, two, three, three, three, and five, they could do any of the following:

- score three threes as 300 and then throw the remaining three dice
- score the single one as 100 and then throw the remaining five dice
- score the single five as 50 and then throw the remaining five dice
- score three threes, the single one, and the single five for a total of 450 and then throw the remaining die
- score three threes, the single one, and the single five for a total of 450 and stop, banking 450 points in that turn

This is not an exhaustive list of plays based on that throw, but it covers the most likely ones. If the player continues throwing, as in any of the above cases except the last, they risk farkling and thus losing all accumulated points. On the other hand, if they score five dice and have only one die to throw, they have a 1 in 3 chance of scoring a single one or a single five, and then having scored all six dice they will have "hot dice" and can throw all six dice again to further increase their score.

Each scoring combination must be achieved in a single throw. For example, if a player has already set aside two individual fives and then throws a third with the four dice remaining, they do not have a triplet of fives for a score of 500 but merely three individual ones for a score of 150.

=== Scoring variations ===
Since farkle is a folk game, variant rules are used in different playing communities. For example, the commercially marketed game of Pocket Farkel differs in that three ones are scored as 300 rather than 1000. In addition, some players score one or more combinations of dice beyond the standard ones. Those variations include the following.

- Rolling no scoring dice with six die (such as two, two, three, four, six, and six) is scored as 500.
- Three pairs (such as one, one, four, four, six, and six) may be scored as 750, 1500, or 2000.
- Two three-of-a-kinds may be scored as 2500 or 3000.
- A straight (one, two, three, four, five, and six) may be scored as 1000, 1500, or 3000.
- A short straight (a one, two, three, four, and five, or a two, three, four, five, and six) is scored as 500.
- A full house (three-of-a-kind and a pair) is scored as the three-of-a-kind value plus 250, for instance a four, four, four, three, and three scores 650, and a one, one, one, three, and three scores 1250.
- Four-of-a-kind and a pair may be scored as 1500.
- Four, five, and six of a kind are scored in one of three ways: adding, doubling, or set value:
  - Adding: For each additional matching die above three of a kind, the three of a kind score is added. For example, three twos, four twos, five twos and six twos are worth 200, 400, 600 and 800 respectively.
  - Doubling: For each additional matching die above three of a kind, the score is doubled. For example, three ones, four ones, five ones and six ones are worth 1000, 2000, 4000 and 8000 respectively.
  - Set value: Four of a kind may be scored as 1000 or 2000, five of a kind may be scored as 2000 or 4000, and six of a kind may be scored as 3000, 6000 or 10000.

=== Play variations ===
Some Farkle rules also incorporate one or more of the following variations in the sequence of play.

- Players may be required to achieve a certain threshold score in their opening turn or turns before they can bank points for the first time, for example 500 or 1000 points. After having reached the threshold once, they are free to stop throwing in subsequent turns whenever they choose.
- In some variations it may be possible for opposing players to steal the turn total of points from a player who has farkled.
- Four or more twos, a "disaster roll" may cause all banked points to be lost.
- Six-of-a-kind may cause an immediate win.
- Players may be required to achieve a certain threshold score every turn before they can bank their points, for example 300 or 350 points.
- In some variations, all scoring groups of dice rolled must be set aside rather than being rerolled if possible.
- In a variant described as "piggybacking" or "high-stakes", each player after the first can choose to begin their turn either with a fresh set of six dice, or by throwing the dice remaining after the previous player has completed their turn. For example, if a player banks three ones for a score of 1000, the next player may choose to roll the remaining three dice. If they score at least one die, they score 1000 plus whatever additional score they accumulate. Players may thus assume the greater risk of farkling for the chance of scoring the points already accumulated by the player before them. If a player ends their turn on a "hot dice", the next player may "piggyback" using all six dice.
- Another variation is using five dice instead of six. This is sometimes called "Hot Dice" today; the original version of Farkle was also played with five dice. In this version, players cannot score three pairs, and this variation often couples an "instant" win option, where on the first roll of the five dice on any turn, if the player rolls five of a kind, that player instantly wins the game, regardless of the scores to that point.
- Players may be required to make at least one additional throw when they have hot dice, even if they have accumulated a high enough score that they would choose not to risk farkling.
- Penalties for repeated farkles, for example deduction of 500 points for three farkles in a row.
- An end-of-game variation described as "welfare" requires the winner to score exactly 10,000 points. If a player scores more than 10,000 points, then all points scored in that turn are given to the player with the lowest score.

== Strategy ==
An optimal strategy for winning a game of Farkle, based on one set of rules, has been determined.

A simplified version of Farkle, in which only single ones and fives score points (groups of three do not exist) can be used productively in statistics education, specifically in AP Statistics. Students can use expected values to determine better strategies for the game.

== Video game versions ==
A video game implementation of Farkle can be found in the popular RPG Kingdom Come: Deliverance as "Farkle", and in its sequel Kingdom Come: Deliverance 2 as "Dice". The version in the game's sequel includes weighted dice of various kinds, as does the version in the first game.

In 2020, a video game version of Farkle was announced as one of the six games included with the Intellivision Amico console. As the console has faced numerous delays, this version remains unreleased.

== Related games ==
- Kismet (dice game)
- Yahtzee
