= Dayakattai =

Dayaboss a dice game originated in Tamilnadu

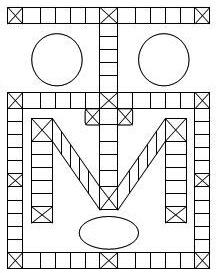
Original board

Dayakattai or Dayaboss is a Tamil dice game played by 2 or 4 people (or multiples) by forming teams. It originated in Tamil Nadu (a southern state of India) and is comparable to another dice game from the country called Pachisi. Dayakattai takes many different forms.

== Etymology ==
The word "Daya" is derived from the Tamil word தாயம் ("Thayam," meaning first stone).

== Equipment ==
The game uses a pair of long square cuboid dice, called the Dayakattai. These dice also go by names such as Daayam and Daala.

They are typically made of brass and have dots punched onto the long faces (1, 2, 3, 0). Each player starts with twelve or six coins/chips at a 'home' in the center of the game board.

== Gameplay ==
Dice counting
Die 2 Die 1	0	1	2	3
0	12	1	2	3
1	1	2	3	4
2	2	3	4	5
3	3	4	5	6

Dhaayam [தாயம்] is a traditional game of Tamil Nadu. Players take turns rolling the Dayakattai. When a player rolls a Dayam (0 on one die and 1 on another), they move one of their pieces one space out of the "home", rolls again and advances their piece by the number indicated by the dice. In order to move all the pieces out of the home, Daayam must be rolled for each one.

Thayam game rules described by a Thayam player

Pieces advance first along the side of the player and then in a clockwise direction. When a player rolls a one, five, six, or twelve (two 0s), they get to roll again. The numbers rolled can be distributed among the player's pieces: e.g., if a player rolls 5, 12 and 2, they can move one piece by 12, move another by 5, and then move a third piece by 2. Alternately, the player could elect to have the three numbers shared by only two pieces or even move only one piece by the total number rolled.

Pieces can 'cut' other pieces from the opponent by landing on the same spot that they are in. A 'cut' piece is sent home. However, while in one of the safe zones (marked by an X), a piece cannot be cut. After completing one lap, a piece starts to move up the outer edge of the right side of its owner's leg of the game board. It stays on the corners instead of the spaces. The piece then needs to move the exact number of spaces to get to the center of the board. While at the corner of the home, a piece can be cut by another piece getting to the corner of its home. Players win by getting all of their pieces to the center of the board. This game has 8 steps.

== Long format ==
In the longer format of the game players start with 8 coins, of which 4 have to move around the board in pairs, i.e. 4 coins form 2 pairs. Paired coins move only when an even number is rolled by the player. The number of paces moved gets halved (e.g. if a player rolls 2 or 4 or 6 or 12, the paired coins can move only 1 or 2 or 3 or 6 paces). Once the inner lap is completed, an outer lap must be completed before the player can move to the outer edge and win the game.

One reason why this format takes a long time, apart from the fact that it has two laps, is due to the "paired coins". Since the pair can move only when even numbers are rolled, if a player has taken all his single coins to the center of the board, it is a daunting task to take the pairs back to the center. However, an advantage of paired coins is that a pair cannot be cut by a single coin, but the reverse is not true.

== Significance ==
One more traditional Dayakattai is in use in some Indian villages; it is called "Marudees" or "Majith," which translates as "a vehicle to God".

The rules are the same with the pieces ranging to 12 numbers each, the cross which comes for every 5 box counts is called a safe place. One team occupies the safe place (pazham zone), which can't be occupied by the other team until it is cleared. The pieces in this safe place cannot be cut, and only if a team cuts at least one of the other team's pieces can it enter the pazham zone. Its zone is usually in the shape of letter M.

The first player to move all 12 coins to pazham is the winner. The Mahābhārata, the famous Indian epic states that the Kauravas invited the Pandavas to gamble for their kingdom over this game.

== See also ==
- Parcheesi - an American adaptation of Pachisi
