= Sa'-ro =

Filipino dice game

Sa'-ro is a dice game played by the Negritos of the Zambales region of the Philippines.

Two small wooden cubes are used as dice, each marked with lines incised on its sides. One set recorded by William Allan Reed in his 1904 book Negritos of Zambales had faces of I, II, III, X, + and #.

The player has five chances to throw the two dice. If the player pairs the dice, they win (Reed does not clarify if the game ends immediately after pairing the dice, or if all five throws are taken regardless). If the player cannot pair the dice within five throws, the game ends as a loss.

Wagers are made usually for small items such as camotes, rough-made cigars, and tobacco leaves. Reed noticed that Roman numerals and modern symbols were used on the dice, but upon inquiry with the Negritos and the surrounding Filipino groups, the game appears to be very old having been handed down by the ancestors of the Negritos and observed when the surrounding Filipinos were first acquainted with the Negritos.
