= Midnight (game) =

Dice game

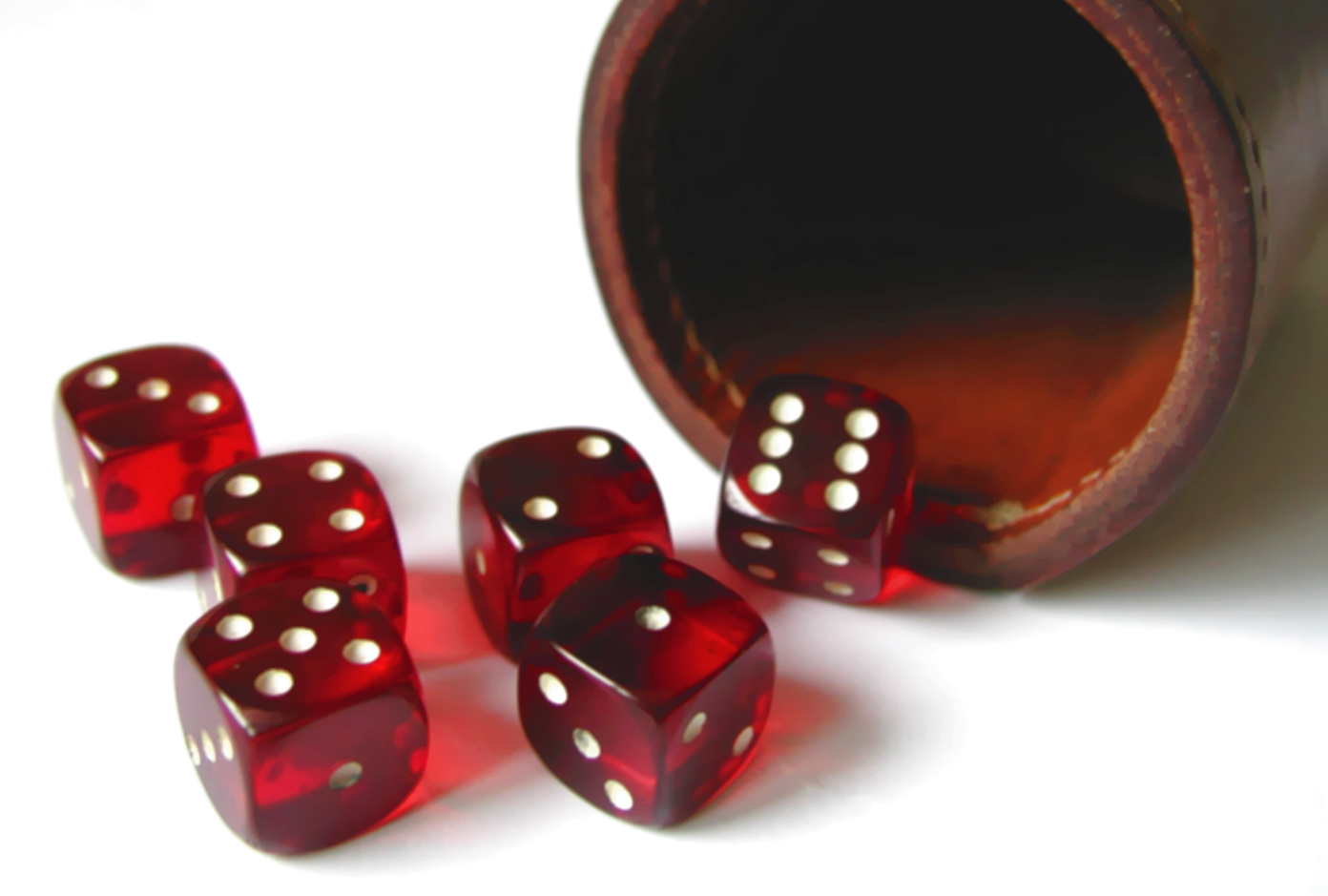
Midnight is played with six six-sided dice

Midnight (or 1-4-24) is a dice game played with six dice.

== Rules ==
One player rolls at a time. All six dice are rolled; the player must "keep" at least one. Any that the player doesn't keep are rerolled. This procedure is then repeated until there are no more dice to roll. Once kept, dice cannot be rerolled. Players must have kept a one and a four, or they do not score. If they have a one and four, the other dice are totaled to give the player's score. The maximum score is 24 (6+6+6+6) The procedure is repeated for the remaining players. The player with the highest four-dice total wins.

If two or more players tie for the highest total, any money bet is added to the next game.

== Example game ==
Dice shown in blue are those rolled that turn.

Roll	Dice	Keep
1	3 4 5 1 2	4 5
2	6 4 3 5 2	6 4 5
3	6 4 2 5 1	6 4 5 1
4	6 4 3 5 1	6 4 3 5 1

The player scores 20 (6+3+5+6).

== Variant game ==
A variant version, called 2-4-24, in which the player must keep a two and a four to score, rather than a one and a four, is sometimes played.

== Strategy ==
=== Maximum probability of scoring ===
It is possible to calculate the probability of scoring if that is the player's sole objective. This would, for instance, be the case if the player was the last to throw and the other players had not scored.

The strategy is to keep a one or a four when they are first thrown and otherwise to keep just one die, as required by the rules. Playing this strategy will mean that the player will score unless they fail to throw a one or a four in 21 (=6+5+4+3+2+1) throws of the dice. This is because the only time a player will keep two dice is when they are one and four, in which the player is guaranteed to score. Since 21 is the maximum number of throws possible, this strategy must maximise the chance of scoring. The probability of scoring is $1-(2(5/6)^n-(4/6)^n)$ where $n$ is the number of dice thrown; in this case 21. This comes from applying the inclusion–exclusion principle to the three cases of failure: you never get any ones with probability $(5/6)^n$, you never get any fours with probability $(5/6)^n$, and you never get any ones or fours with probability $(4/6)^n$. Plugging in $n=21$ gives the chance of scoring as approximately 95.7%, the maximum possible.

The formula can also be used to calculate the probability of having a one and a four after each throw when using this strategy.

Number of dice thrown	Probability
6	41.8%
5	74.2%
4	87.2%
3	92.6%
2	94.8%
1	95.7%

So the player has a 41.8% chance of throwing a one and a four on the first throw of the dice and a 74.2% chance of throwing a one and a four after the second throw of the dice.

The formula can be used to calculate the maximum probability of scoring when the player has less than six dice.

Number of dice left	With neither a one nor a four	With either a one or a four
6	95.7%	–
5	87.2%	93.5%
4	69.4%	83.8%
3	41.8%	66.5%
2	13.9%	42.1%
1	0.0%	16.7%

So the player has an 87.2% chance of scoring even when they only have five dice left and they have not kept a one or a four on the first throw. They have a 93.5% chance of scoring at this stage if they kept a one or four on the first throw. When a player hasn't kept either a one or a four and has only two dice left, the chance of getting a one and four with these two dice is 13.9%.
