= Pass the Pigs =

Board game

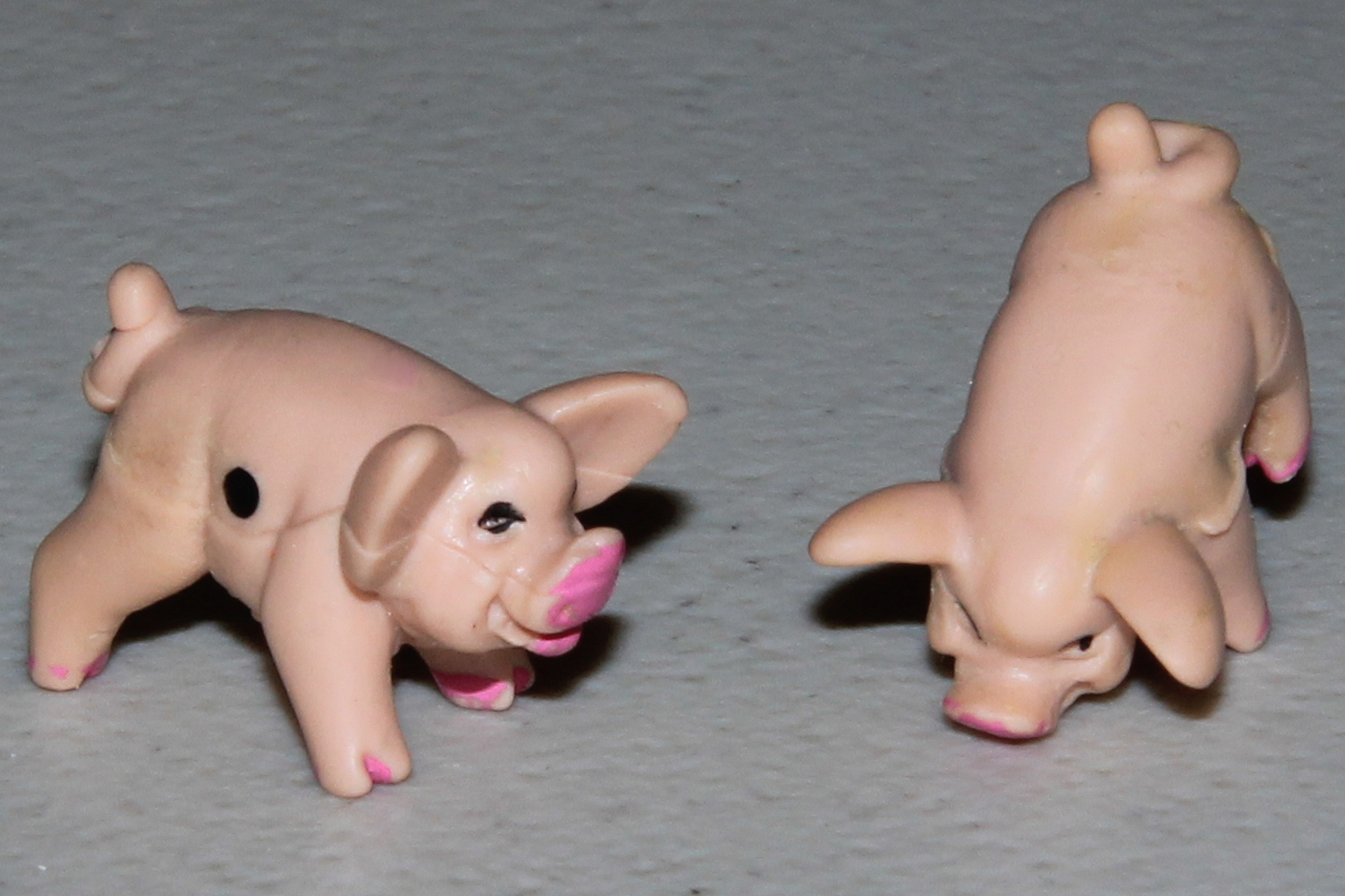
- An example of a roll in Pass the Pigs. The player rolled a trotter on the left and a snouter on the right, and earns 15 points for the two pigs.
- Publishers: Winning Moves
- Players: 2 or more players, preferably up to 4
- Setup time: A few seconds of unpacking

Pass the Pigs is a commercial version of the dice game Pig, but using custom asymmetrical throwing dice, similar to shagai. It was created by David Moffat and published by Recycled Paper Products as Pig Mania! in 1977.

The publishing license was later sold to Milton Bradley and the game renamed Pass the Pigs. In 1992, publishing rights for North America were sold to Winning Moves Games USA, which acquired the game outright from David Moffat Enterprises in early 2017.

== Rules ==
Each turn involves one player throwing two model pigs, each of which has a dot on one side. The player gains or loses points, or is eliminated from the game based on the way the pigs land. Each turn lasts until the player throwing either rolls the pigs in a way that wipes out their current turn score, wipes out their total game score, or decides to stop their turn, add their turn score to their total score and pass the pigs to the next player. The winner is the first player to reach a predetermined total score, usually 100 points.

=== Scoring ===
Generally, a position's score is inversely proportional to its likelihood of occurring.

If one, and only one, of the pigs is lying on its side, that pig scores nothing, and the other pig scores as follows:

- Razorback - The pig is lying on its back with its trotters facing upwards - 5 points
- Trotter - The pig is standing on all four trotters akin to normal pigs - 5 points
- Snouter - The pig is resting on its snout and front trotters - 10 points
- Leaning Jowler - The pig is resting on its trotter, snout and ear - 15 points

If neither pig is lying on its side, the score is the sum of the individual positions. If both pigs land in the same position, the sum is doubled; equivalently, the score for the individual position is quadrupled:

- Mixed Combo - Sum of individual scores
- Double Razorback - (5 + 5) × 2 = 20 points
- Double Trotter - (5 + 5) × 2 = 20 points
- Double Snouter - (10 + 10) × 2 = 40 points
- Double Leaning Jowler - (15 + 15) × 2 = 60 points

If both pigs land on their sides, the score is as follows:

- Sider - Pigs lie on the same side, either spot up or spot down - 1 point
- Pig Out - Pigs lie on opposite sides - Player's score for the turn is set to 0; play passes to the next player.

Finally, if the pigs come to rest touching each other:

- Makin' Bacon (or Oinker) - Both pigs are touching and both are resting on the table - Player's total score from the game is set to 0; play passes to the next player.
- Piggyback - One pig rests on top of the other pig and the pig on top is not touching the table - Player is eliminated from the game and cannot play anymore; play passes to the next player.

There are several variations to these game rules. One is the Hog Call, where a player attempts to guess the score their opponent is about to land. After scoring 20 points a non-throwing player may attempt a Hog Call. To do so, the non-throwing player must scream "sooee!" before the opposing players throw. The caller must then guess the score of the next throw, but cannot guess a Pig Out, Makin' Bacon, or Piggyback. If correct, the caller receives double the points thrown, and the thrower loses double the points thrown. If incorrect, the caller loses double the points thrown, and the thrower gains double the points thrown. Only one player may hog call per throw.

=== Variants ===
- Pass The Pigs Big Pigs (2016) - by Winning Moves Games USA- Each pig measures about 6" and is made of foam rubber. They land in all the same poses as the standard 2 pigs. It includes a larger score pad and a drawstring storage bag.
- Pass The Pigs Pig Party Edition (2011)-Winning Moves Games USA- The game includes 4 sets of pigs for a total of 8 pigs. The gameplay is a little different from standard Pass The Pigs in that players try to roll a position, or combination, as depicted on a card from the roll-card deck. Players take turns and whoever rolls it first wins the card and the points. If a player rolls the move pictured on the first roll they win the card plus a bonus roll. A bonus roll entitles the player to roll all eight pigs at once to get bonus points.

== Relative frequencies ==
The approximate relative frequencies of the various positions (for a single pig), using a standardized surface and trap-door rolling device and a sample size of 11,954, are

Position	Percentage
Side (no dot)	35.0%
Side (dot)	30.2%
Razorback	22.4%
Trotter	8.8%
Snouter	3.0%
Leaning Jowler	0.6%
