= Dead Man's Dice =

Dice game

- Designers: Martin H. Samuel
- Illustrators: Martin H. Samuel; David Penfound
- Publishers: Games Above Board; Channel Craft
- Players: 2 - 6
- Setup time: 1 minute
- Playing time: 20 minutes
- Age range: 7 and up
- Skills: Tactics, strategy, concentration

Dead Man's Dice is a pirate-themed game, played with dice, employing luck, strategy, and the accumulation of points.

The game was designed by Martin H. Samuel and originally produced for two to six players by Games Above Board. Channel Craft, Inc. of Charleroi, Pennsylvania, United States, published a 2-player version of the game in 2006.

Giseh Verlag launched the game in Germany at Essen Spiel.

The skull and pistols graphic was designed by David Penfound of Andover, England.

== Components ==
- 2 Jolly Roger dice and 4 regular dice
- Score pad
- Pencil
- Instructions

== Objective ==
The goal of the game is to pile up the points with all your dice before the opponent(s), while plundering other pirates, and score points which count as doubloons.

== Gameplay ==
The Dead Man's Dice game is played on a flat surface. Players (termed "pirates" in-game) choose 1 Jolly Roger and 2 regular dice each.

To begin, pirates roll any one of their dice, and the pirate with the lowest number rolls another die. If two or more pirates roll the same lowest number, all pirates roll again. Then, taking turns, play rotates clockwise round by round, with pirates rolling their remaining dice one at a time.

A pirate may place their rolled die on top of their own die if:

1. it matches,
2. it is in ascending numerical sequence – or,
3. it totals 7 with the die currently on top.

PLUNDER: pirates must roll a die before they plunder and may then take an opponent's top die - placing it on their pile if it meets either Rule 2. or 3. Pirates may plunder any number of possible dice on a turn.

JOLLY ROGER: a pirate may mutiny and roll this special die on any of their turns. If their special die is rolled first and the Jolly Roger comes up, it is the 1 spot. This die only has a special value and a point value of 7 if the skull and crossbones come up.
A rolled Jolly Roger may be placed on the pile regardless of the top number. A Jolly Roger may not be plundered.
A pirate caught red-handed holding their special die at the end of a round – Dead Man's Dice, is keelhauled and subtracts 7 points.
If a pirate ends around with the Jolly Roger on the top, that player doubles the points value of their pile.

If a pirate does not have at least one die in their pile due to opponents' plundering, that pirate must roll a die on their next turn – and may then plunder if possible. A turn is over when a pirate is marooned and cannot place a die on their pile - a round is over when a pirate's pistol is empty and has no more dice to play. Pirates then add up the points on the tops of the dice in their pile o’ treasure.

A pirate who falls overboard (knocks their own pile over) returns any plundered dice, and starts again on their next turn. A pirate who fires a broadside with their rolled die and blows an opponent's pile to Davy Jones’ Locker (knocks it over) walks the plank, and deducts 7 points. The victim returns any plundered dice and immediately starts again.

Pirates keep their own score (on the pad) throughout the game, overlooked points are forfeited, and the game is over when a pirate has scored 100 doubloons and is then the winner.

== See also ==
- Game design
