= Erwin Glonnegger =

Erwin Glonnegger (19 May 1925, Aulendorf - 6 February 2016, Ravensburg) was a German writer and game designer for the company Ravensburger; he was the inventor of the game Concentration.
