= Drop dead (dice game) =

North American dice game

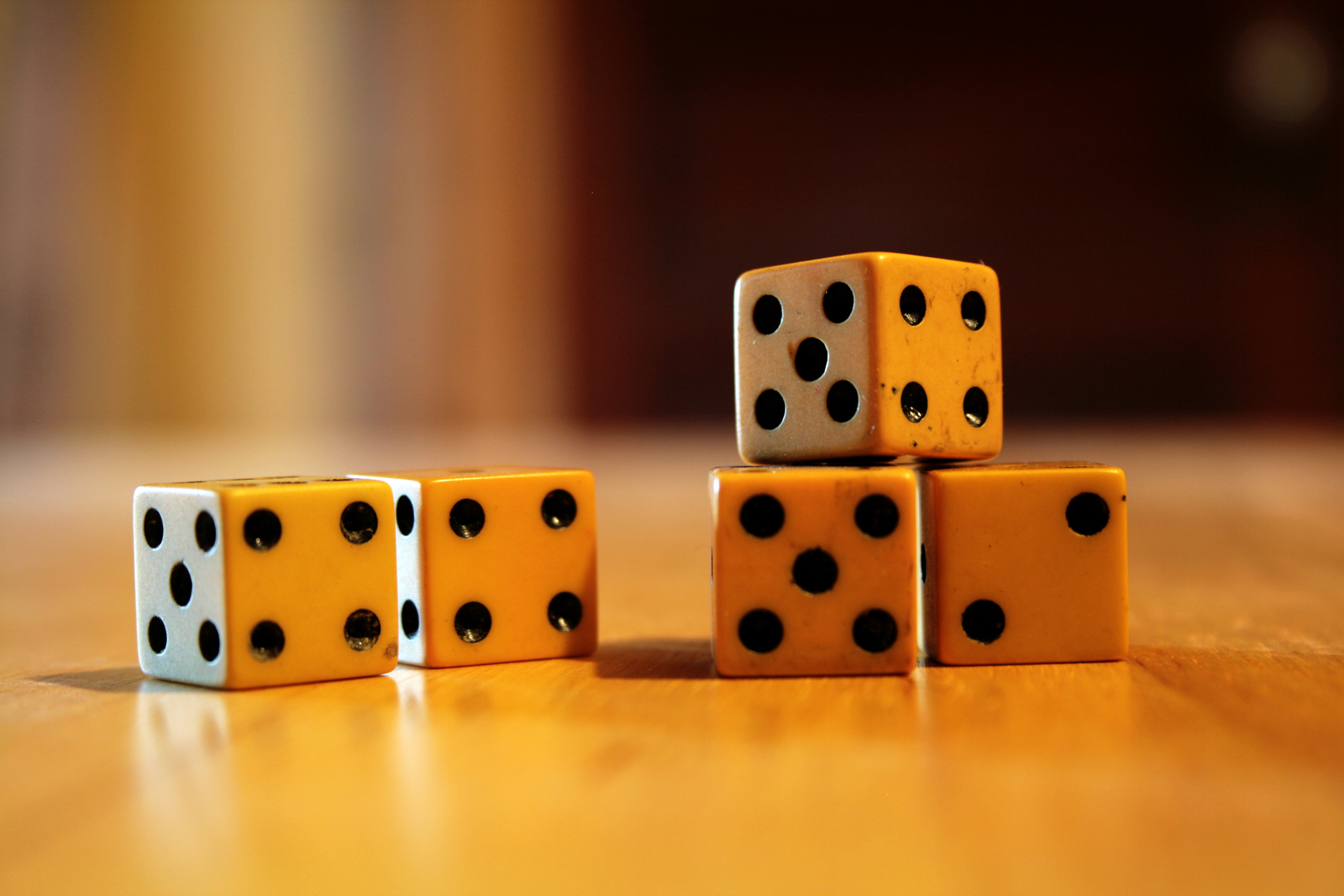
Drop dead is played with five dice

Drop dead is a dice game in which the players try to gain the highest total score. The game was created in New York.

Five dice and paper to record players' scores are all that is needed. A player rolls the five dice, and if none of the dice come up a two or five, the total of the rolled numbers added together is added to the player's score. That player is also able to roll the dice again. When a player rolls the dice and any of them contain a two or five, no points are recorded immediately, and the dice that include twos and fives are excluded from the future throws. A player's turn does not stop until their last remaining dice are all twos or fives. At that point, the player "drops dead" and it becomes the next player's turn. The highest total score wins.

The textbook Understanding Probability by Henk Tijms uses the dice game in a math question about simulation.
