= Petals around the rose =

Puzzle involving inductive reasoning

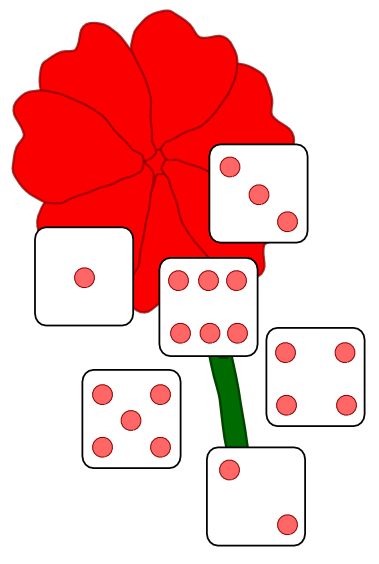
The answer to this roll is six

Petals around the rose is a puzzle in which the object is to work out the rule by which a number is derived from the roll of a set of five or six dice. It has been used as an exercise in inductive reasoning. The puzzle became popular in computer circles in the mid 1970s, particularly through an anecdote recounted in the September/October 1977 issue of Personal Computing which describes Bill Gates trying to solve the puzzle in an airport.

The origin of the puzzle is unknown.

== Puzzle play ==
The puzzle is presented as a challenge in which one person (the presenter) who is familiar with the puzzle's rule rolls the dice and announces the calculated result for their roll, repeating ad nauseam. Players are challenged to work out the formula being used by the presenter and to verbally announce the calculated result of each roll along with the presenter. It is intended that they keep the formula to themselves.

=== The formula ===
The key to the formula is given by the name of the puzzle, and the presenter should state the name of the challenge distinctly. The calculated (announced) result for a throw is calculated by counting only the "petals around the rose", where a "rose" is any die face with a center dot. On a standard 6-sided die, this corresponds to the three odd faces—one, three, and five. The rose's "petals" are the dots which surround the center dot. There is no rose on the two, four, or six faces, so these count as zero. There are no petals on the one face, so it also counts as zero. There are two petals and four petals on the three and five faces, respectively. The solution to a given throw is the total number of petals.

For example, in a roll of one, two, three, four, five, and six, the only petals are on the three and five faces, for a total of 6 (ie. (3 − 1) + (5 − 1) = 2 + 4 = 6).

A way to express this as a formula is to add 2 times the number of dice that land on the three face to 4 times the number of dice that lands on the five face.
