= Pugasaing =

Native American dice game

Pugasaing (or the game of bowl and counters) is a Native American dice game played by the Ojibwe. It is mentioned by name in Henry Wadsworth Longfellow's poem, The Song of Hiawatha. The word pugasaing is the participle form of the verb "to throw" in the Ojibwe language.

Pugasaing is played using thirteen counters of bone carved into various shapes (men, snakes, war clubs, fish and ducks), along with four circular brass counters. These are thrown from a bowl, and a score is derived from the way in which they fall, depending on which sides land uppermost. The best possible score is 158, which occurs when all the pieces land red-side up and one of the men lands upright on top of one of the brass counters.

Pugasaing was often used for gambling, with players staking personal belongings, family members and their own servitude on the results of the throw. Some players became professional gamblers, travelling around the country and making their living from the game.
