= Cookie Fu =

Cookie Fu is a 2003 collectible dice game published by Blue Kabuto.

== Gameplay ==
Cookie Fu is a game in which players use fortune‑cookie‑themed moves, customizable fighters, and booster‑pack upgrades to battle in quick 10–15 minute matches.

== Reviews ==
- Pyramid
- Scrye #58
