= Sho (board game) =

Sho ( Tibetan : ཤོ ) is a traditional race game in Tibet, still common today. Its name is simply the Tibetan word for "dice". It is traditionally played for money and by men, with two to four players—three being the most common. With four players, the usual variant is to play as two teams of two, with the partners sitting opposite each other.

== Equipment ==
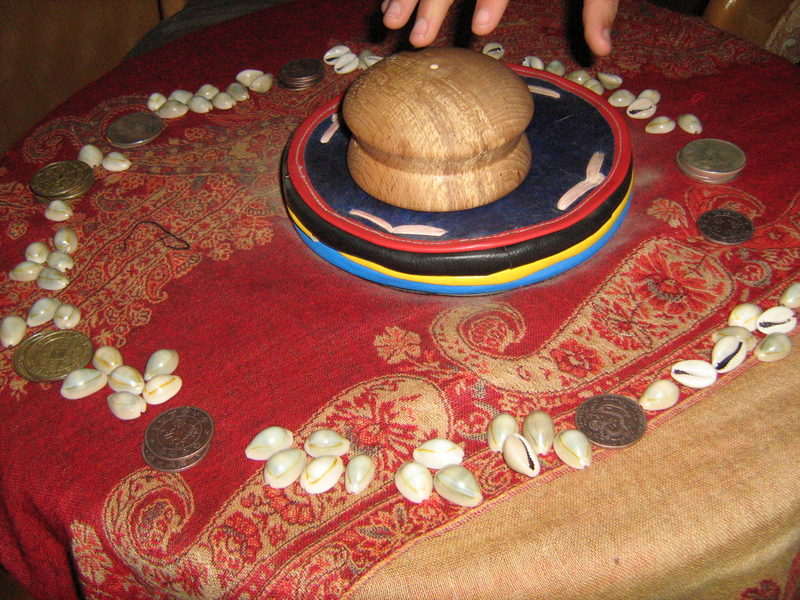
The Tibetan game of sho in progress

The "board" is formed by a circular line of shells, typically sixty-four in number.

Each player (or team) has nine identical playing pieces, which are usually old coins. In any case, the playing pieces have to be stackable.
Two six-sided dice are used. They are placed in a wooden dice cup which is shaken and then slammed down onto a dice pad, typically made of yak leather stuffed with yak wool, which forms the centre of the board, within the circle of shells.

== Basic gameplay ==
The first player to move all nine coins from the beginning of the board to the end is the winner.

The shells are formed into a clockwise spiral shape around the dice pad. The spaces between the shells are the playing positions which can be occupied by the coins. As the coin stacks move around this dynamic playing board, the shells are rearranged to expand or contract the spiral and the spaces between the shells, which means the game has a very tactile feel to it.

Each playing position can be occupied by a coin or stack of coins from only one player. A stack of coins is moved as one unit. A stack can be increased but never reduced; a stack is destroyed when it is kicked out and all its coins are sent back to the start.

The players take turns to throw the dice. The player chooses which coin or stack to move from its current position to a new target position determined by moving it forward the number of positions (inter-shell spaces) corresponding to the throw of the dice - the total of the dice is taken so there is no difference between, say, the rolls (4,2), (5,1) or (3,3) - all are moved as 6. (This is unlike in backgammon, for example.)

Depending on whether and how this new target playing position is occupied, there are four possibilities:

1. the position is vacant - the player places his coin/stack in the new position
2. the position is occupied by coins of the same player - the player stacks his coins onto the coins in the target position, creating a larger stack
3. the position is occupied by coins of an opposing player, with the number of coins equal to or less than the number of coins in the stack being moved - the player kills the opposing stack and occupies the new position, sending the opposing coins back to the start
4. the position is occupied by coins of an opposing player, with the number of coins more than the number of coins in the stack being moved - the player cannot move that coin/stack

If the player cannot move or if they simply place their coin/stack in a new space, play passes to the next play clockwise.

However, if the player can stack or kill, they roll and move again. If they again stack or kill, they roll again, and so on until they can only place or cannot move. So with the luck of the dice, game-changing sequences of moves can be achieved.

=== Pa ra or Snake eyes ===
The only dice roll which has a special significance in the basic game is (1,1) which is called pa ra in Tibetan. This entitles the player to roll the dice again before they move and then choose from a selection of move values. For example, if the player rolls (1,1)=2 then (5,3)=8, the player has a choice of moving 2, 8, or 10 (=the sum of 2 and 8). Furthermore, if one of the two dice roll values (not the sum, so here either 2 or 8) is chosen and this leads to a kill or stack, the player then carries over the unused value to their subsequent roll. And so on if this also lead to a kill or stack. In this way, moves above the usual maximum roll of (6,6)=12 become possible.

For example:

1. The player rolls (1,1) and then rolls again, the dice show (5,6). The choice of moves is therefore 2, 11 or 13.
2. A move of 2 enables the player to kill an opponent's stack, so the player can roll again, the dice show (3,4)=7
3. The unused roll of 11 is carried forward, so the player now a choice of move: 11, 7 or (11+7=)18.
4. A move of 11 enables the player to stack, so they move 11 and now they can roll again, the dice show (2,3)=5.
5. The unused roll of 7 is carried forward, so the player has a choice of move: 7, 5 or (7+5=)12.
6. The player chooses to move one of their stacks 12 spaces into a vacant space. The move is now over and play passes to the next player.

== Special rules ==
These variants and others can be found among sho players with their personal and traditional preferences:

- No niner-stack: In this variant, it is forbidden to build a stack of all nine coins. So players are denied the often-observed effect that the first player to create a stack of nine then charges on to inevitably win the game.
- Six-Three: Where niner-stacks are allowed, this rule says that if a player has all their pieces killed during the game and once again has all nine pieces in their hand at the start of the board, then in this situation a dice roll of (6,3) allows them to bring all nine pieces as one stack into the ninth position, as long as this position is vacant.
- After killing the last stack of an opposing player, which means that opposing player now has all their coins back at the start, the player who kills does not roll again. Instead, their turn ends.
- The flexible pa ra variant: Upon rolling a pa ra (1,1), the dice are rolled again and the total dice count is taken and split flexibly between two stacks. So, if the player rolls (1,1) followed by (5,6), this gives a dice count total of 13. The player can move a first choice of stack any number of spaces (including 1 space - normally not available from a dice roll). For example, the player chooses to move one stack 4 spaces. Then a second stack can be moved (13-4=) 9 spaces. If this second move results in a stack or kill, the player rolls again, as usual.
- When a stack reaches the end of the board, the unused dice count can be used to move a second stack. So if one stack is 5 shells from the board finish and the player rolls 11, the player moves the finishing stack 5 spaces to the end and then chooses a second stack which he moves (11-5=) 6 spaces.

== Gambling ==
The game is often the focus of gambling. The most simple versions involves a fixed stake per game, which each player pays by placing the bank notes under the dice pad. The winner takes the combined stakes.
