= Dice Throne =

Tabletop game

- Designers: Nate Chatellier, Manny Trembley
- Publishers: Roxley Games
- Years active: 2018–present
- Players: 2–6
- Setup time: 5 minutes
- Playing time: 20–40 minutes
- Chance: Medium (dice rolling)
- Age range: 8+
- Skills: Strategy, Probability, Tactics
- Website: dicethrone.com

Dice Throne is a hybrid dice and card game designed by Nate Chatellier and Manny Trembley that blends elements of strategy, probability, and tactical decision-making, often described as "Yahtzee meets Magic: The Gathering". Players engage in fantasy-themed battles, winning by eliminating all other opponents using their chosen hero's unique set of dice and cards.

== Gameplay ==
Each player selects a unique hero with their own set of five custom dice, player board showing the hero's abilities (activated by rolling a specific combination of dice), and deck of cards. Many cards are common to all heroes, but some are hero specific.

Players start with 50 health and win by reducing their opponent's health to zero. Each turn, players draw a card and gain a combat point (CP), which are used to play cards. On their turn, players roll dice up to three times in an attempt to activate an ability and may "lock" or "unlock" any number of dice after each roll. Abilities generally deal damage or apply status effects, like poisoning the opponent or protecting the user. Cards heavily influence the outcome of a match: they can permanently upgrade abilities, manipulate dice rolls, impact combat results, apply status effects, and generate resources such as extra cards or CP.

Dice Throne is played with 2 to 6 players in various formats including 1v1, 2v2, 3v3, or free-for-all.

== Characters ==
Dice Throne features 45 unique heroes as of July 2026. Each hero has a complexity rating (ranging from 1 to 6) that measures how difficult they are to play. Higher complexity heroes often take more time to master and require good strategy to play effectively.

Each hero is designed to be fully standalone and cross-compatible with others, allowing for a wide variety of matchups and strategies.

== Expansions and Spin-offs ==
- Dice Throne Adventures (2020) – A cooperative dungeon-crawling expansion, players use their heroes in a persistent campaign setting.
- Dice Throne: Santa v. Krampus (2022) – A holiday-themed 2-Hero pack, featuring original takes on Santa and Krampus.
- Marvel Dice Throne (2022) – A licensed version featuring Marvel characters like Thor, Loki, and Scarlet Witch.
