= Bar dice =

Drinking game

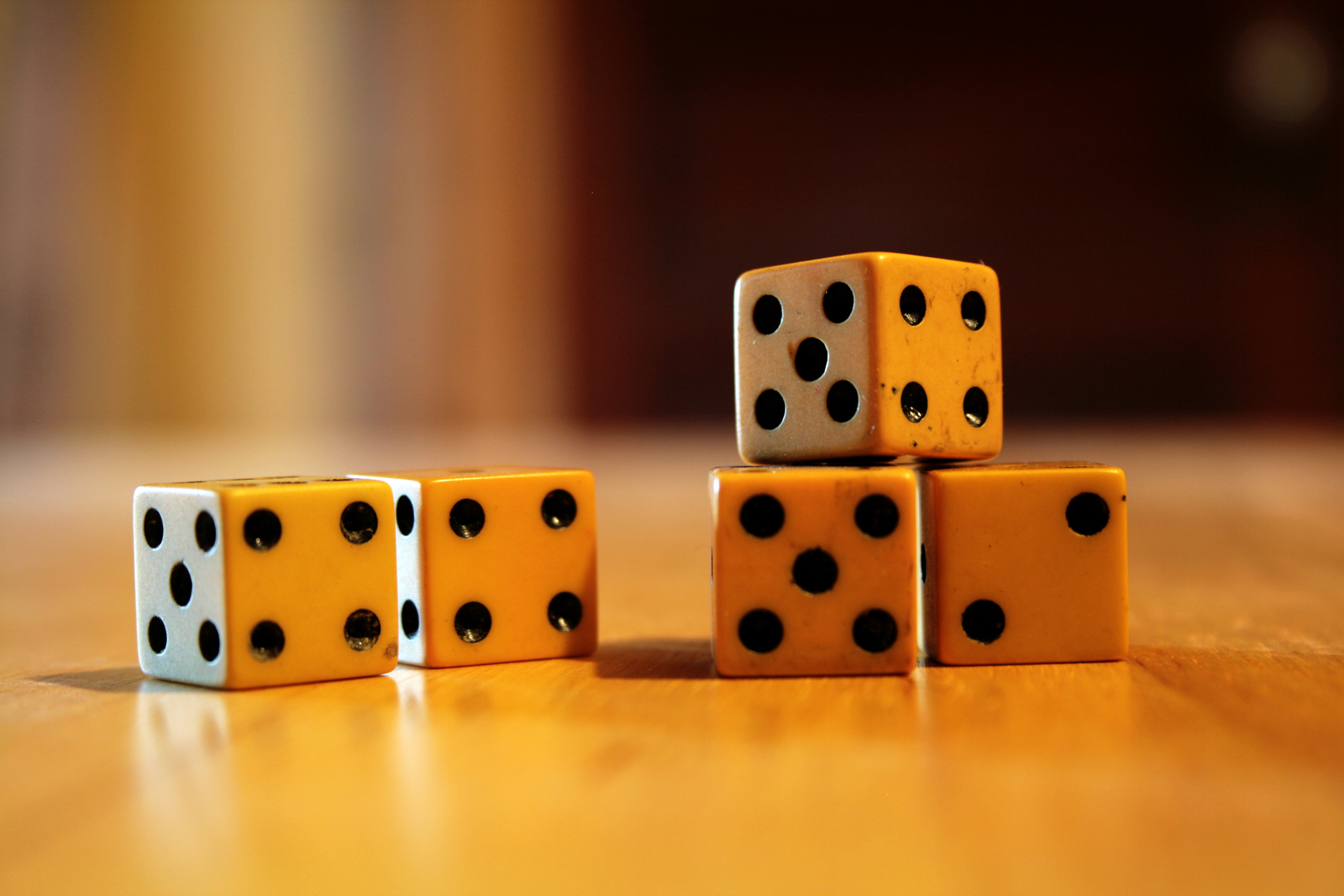
The game of bar dice uses five dice

Bar dice is a drinking game played with five dice and a cup. Generally played in a bar, tavern or pub, the game is often used to determine which of the participants will pay for the next round of drinks.

== Game mechanics ==
Bar dice is played with five six-sided dice, with each player attempting to assemble the highest hand possible from each "flop" or toss of the dice. Each round of the game will result with one player who has the highest hand; that player is "out" and can neither continue playing nor is responsible for the purchase of the next round of drinks.

Scoring is based on amassing the largest number of dice with the same digits. Each hand must include at least a single "Ace", or one, in order to be a valid hand; Aces act as "wilds", and can be paired with any other digit. The strength of a player's hand depends first on the number of digits and then value of those digits. As an example, a hand with four 3's is better than a hand with three 5's, but not better than a hand with five 2's.

Rules vary from place to place. In Wisconsin, when the game has only two players remaining each player is allowed three shakes of the dice, attempting to get the highest score.

== See also ==
- List of drinking games
