= Kitsune bakuchi =

Dice game from Japan

Kitsune Bakuchi (狐博奕) is a dice game from Japan in which a player rolls three dice; if the roll results in a triple, i.e., each dice shows the same number, they win four times the amount wagered. The term literally means "fox gambling."

== Probability ==
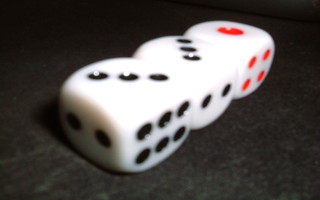
Three dice, showing 3-3-1. This would be a losing throw in kitsune bakuchi.

There are only six triples (winning throws) out of 216 total possible throws, so the winning probability is 6/216 = 1/36. Thus the house edge with a standard payout of 4× the original bet is 210/216 – (4-1)·6/216 = 95.8%; a fair game of Kitsune Bakuchi with zero house edge would pay out winnings at 36 for 1, i.e., the winning player would receive their bet back plus a bonus equal to 35 times the original bet.

== Similar games ==
There are several dice games whose names include fox (狐, kitsune; or キツネ), dating from the Edo period:

Fox Choboichi (狐ちょぼいち, Kitsune Choboichi)
This is an alternate name for choboichi, which uses a single die. Players wager on a single number, and receive 5× the original bet if the bet matches the number that is rolled. In this case the house edge is 16.7%.
Fox (狐, Kitsune) / Fox Chobo (狐ちょぼ, Kitsune Chobo)
This is a subset of sic bo or chuck-a-luck, both of which use three dice. Players wager on a single number, and the payout varies depending on how many dice show that number; if only one die matches, the payout is 1:1; if two match, it is 3:1; and if three match, it is 4:1. In this case the house edge is 40.3%.
Fox Chobo (キツネチョボ, Kitsune Chobo)
This is a variant of Bầu cua tôm cá, Crown and Anchor, and Hoo Hey How, each of which uses three dice with special symbols; in Fox Chobo, standard dice are used. Again, players wager on a single number, and the payout is slightly different: 1:1 for one match, 3:1 for two matches, and 5:1 for three matches; this reduces the house edge to 39.8%. There are two special rolls which result in an automatic win for the dealer, which are 4-5-1 and 3-2-6.
Fox (キツネ, Kitsune)
Like chō-han, this game uses two dice. Players bet on one number, with a payout of 3:1 for a single match and 4:1 for a pair. However, the dealer selects two numbers before rolling; if both numbers are matched, the dealer wins all bets. The house edge is 2.78%.
