= Big Six wheel =

Game of chance played with a wheel

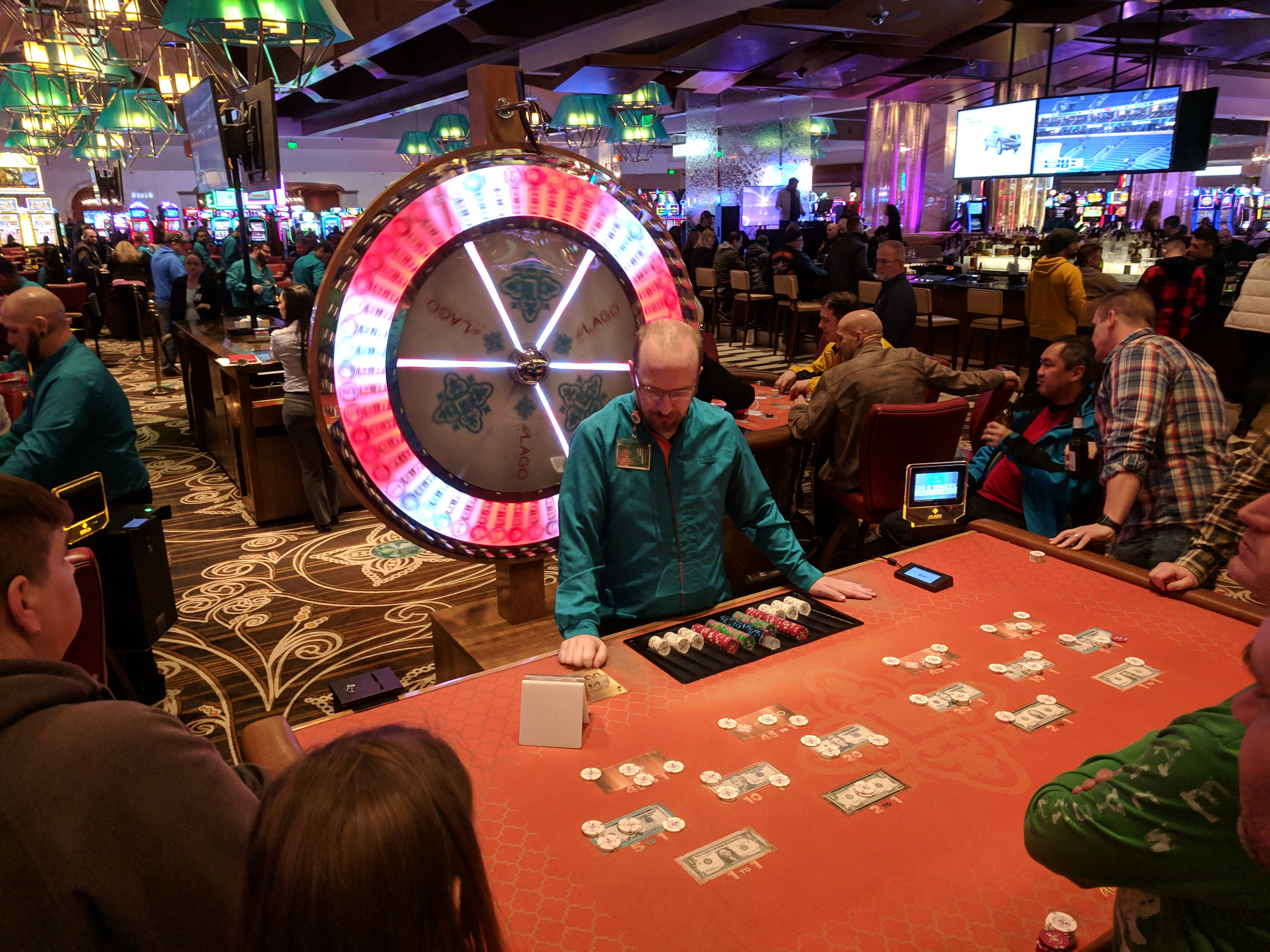
A Big Six wheel at Del Lago Resort and Casino

The Big Six wheel (also known simply as The Big Six, the Wheel of Fortune, or the Big Wheel) is an unequal game of chance, played using a large vertical wheel that can be spun.

Since 13 May 2002, it can be played legally in licensed casinos in the United Kingdom, under The Gaming Clubs (Bankers' Games), (Amendment) Regulations 2002 (Statutory Instrument 2002/1130).

The game is also in casinos in the United States.

== Rules ==
The wheel is divided into a number of equal segments separated by spokes or pins. Each segment is associated with a number. The wheel is spun by a dealer, and the winning segment is indicated by a pointer mounted on a flexible piece of rubber or leather, which also rubs against the pins to impart friction and slow the wheel down. Should the player stop the wheel, the segment at the top is the winner.

== Variants ==
There are a number of variants of the game, that divide the wheel into a different number of segments, use different symbols in the segments, and have different odds if a symbol is selected.

=== Money wheel ===
This variant is the most common in casinos in the United States. The symbols are $1, $2, $5, $10 and $20 bills — and two special symbols, a joker and the casino logo. The $1 bills pay at odds of 1 to 1, the $2 bills at 2 to 1, the $5 bills at 5 to 1, and so on. The joker and the logo pay at odds of 40 to 1 or 45 to 1, depending on local gaming regulations or the practice of the casino.

The house advantage or edge (the proportion of the stakes that the casino expects to win on average) of this game is one of the highest of most casino games. In the United States it ranges from 11.1% on the $1-bill bet to more than 24% on the joker or logo (when it pays at 40 to 1). In Australia the house edge is 7.69% on all bets, so that the payouts on a 52-segment wheel are 47:1, 23:1, 11:1, 5:1, 3:1 and 1:1.

=== Dice wheel ===
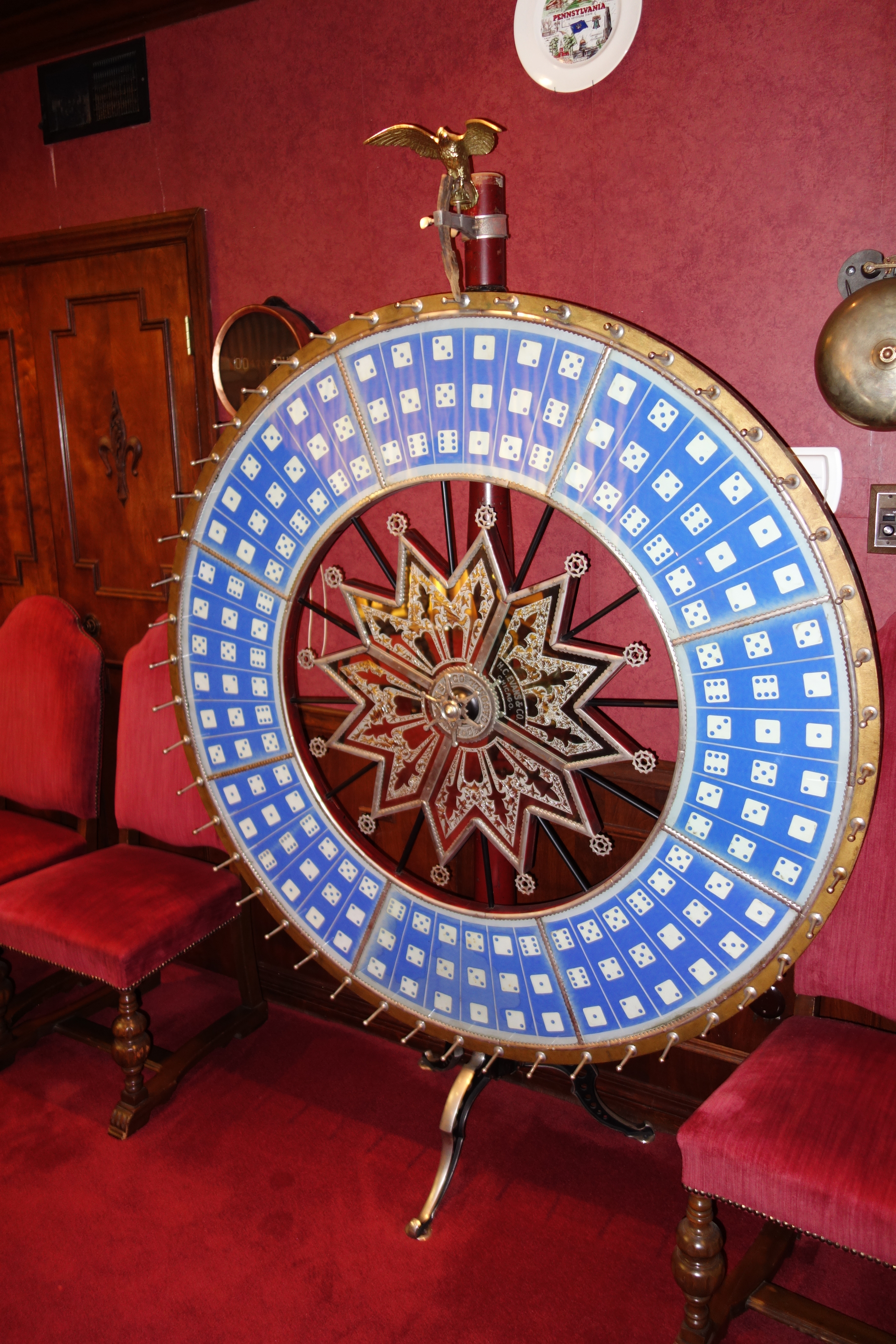
An example of the 'dice wheel' variant produced by H. C. Evans & Co. of Chicago

The symbols on the wheel represent some of the 216 (6 × 6 × 6) possible combinations of three dice. Sometimes the same combination appears in more than one segment. Players wager on the numbers 1 through 6. If the number appears on one of the dice in the winning segment, the dealer pays at 1 to 1; on two of the dice, 2 to 1; on all three of the dice, 3 to 1.

One example of a dice wheel, manufactured by H. C. Evans & Co. of Chicago (or its successor), is divided into 54 segments:

- 24 segments with triples; each triple (1-1-1, 2-2-2, etc.) appears four times
- 24 segments with doubles; each double (1-1-x, 2-2-y, etc.) appears four times:
  - 2-1-1
  - 2-2-1
  - 4-3-3
  - 5-4-4
  - 6-5-5
  - 6-6-3
  - Note the non-pair value appears precisely once in a group of these six pairs
- 6 segments with three different numbers; each of the following combinations of three different numbers appears three times:
  - 3, 2, 1
  - 6, 5, 4

In the example above, there are 54 (24 + 24 + 6) possible outcomes for a single spin of the wheel. For a specific number:

- There are 7 possible outcomes where only one die will match the number; payout 1:1
  - 3× in the three-different-number combinations
  - 4× in the paired combinations
- There are 4 possible outcomes where only two dice will match; payout 2:1
- There are 4 possible outcomes where all three dice will match; payout 3:1

At odds of 1 to 1, 2 to 1, and 3 to 1, respectively, for each of these types of outcome, the expected loss as a percentage of the stake wagered is:

1 - [(7/54) * 2 + (4/54) * 3 + (4/54) * 4] = 22.22%

The symbolism of the game is redolent of chuck-a-luck or sic bo, games of chance played with three dice. However, the house advantage or edge is greater than for chuck-a-luck, which itself has a higher house advantage than other casino games.

This variety is seldom seen in casinos, but frequently seen as a carnival game, or at a charity "Monte Carlo night" fund-raiser. A similar game, the "Big Nine" wheel, has five numbers on each segment, and also three special symbols, appearing on three spaces each, which pay 10:1 odds.

=== United Kingdom, Australia and New Zealand ===
A legal game in a licensed casino in the United Kingdom, Australia or New Zealand involves a wheel at least 1.5 metres in diameter divided into 52 segments, each marked with one of seven symbols (referred to as A to G). The table below sets out the frequency of the symbols, their probability, the associated odds specified, and the house advantage or edge.

Symbol	Number of segments	Probability of winning	UK		AUS & NZ	
Symbol	Number of segments	Probability of winning	Odds offered	House edge	Odds offered	House edge
A	1 out of 52	1.92%	50 to 1	1.92%	47 to 1	7.69%
B	1 out of 52	1.92%	50 to 1	1.92%	47 to 1	7.69%
C	2 out of 52	3.85%	20 to 1	19.23%	23 to 1	7.69%
D	4 out of 52	7.69%	10 to 1	15.38%	11 to 1	7.69%
E	8 out of 52	15.38%	5 to 1	7.69%	5 to 1	7.69%
F	12 out of 52	23.08%	3 to 1	7.69%	3 to 1	7.69%
G	24 out of 52	46.15%	1 to 1	7.69%	1 to 1	7.69%

=== Other variants ===
Other variants, using different symbols and odds, are relatively rare in the United States.

One variant called "Mississippi Derby" was used for a short time at the Grand Casino in Gulfport, Mississippi. (The casino was destroyed in 2005 by Hurricane Katrina.) The symbols were combinations of three of a number of different horses, arranged to represent a winner, a second-placed horse and a third-placed horse. (The horses were represented in three concentric rings, with the winner on the outer ring.) Players wagered on particular horses to "win", "place" or "show", as with betting in horse racing. The payoffs varied from horse to horse, depending on how many times and where the horse appeared on the rings. Odds ranged from 40 to 1 for the "longshot" to win, down to 1-2 for the "favorite" to show.
