= List of Akane-banashi chapters =

First tankōbon volume cover, featuring Akane and her father

Written by Yuki Suenaga and illustrated by Takamasa Moue, Akane-banashi began serialization in Shueisha's shōnen manga magazine Weekly Shōnen Jump on February 14, 2022. The rakugo in the series is supervised by professional rakugoka Kikuhiko Hayashiya. Publisher Shueisha is collecting the individual chapters into tankōbon volumes, with the first released on June 3, 2022.

== Volumes ==
No.	Original release date	Original ISBN	English release date	English ISBN
1	June 3, 2022	978-4-08-883150-3	August 8, 2023	978-1-9747-3648-5
1. "On That Day" (あの日, Ano Hi); 2. "Six Years" (6年, 6-Nen); 3. "First Performance" (初高座, Hatsu Kōza); 4. "Who Is That?" (何者, Nanimono); 5. "Proper Channels" (通すべき筋, Tōsubeki Suji); 6. "Senior Pupils" (兄弟子達, Anideshitachi); 7. "Kibataraki" (気働き)
Akane requests to become a formal rakugo apprentice under Shiguma Arakawa (VI), her father's former master who has been secretly giving her lessons for the last six years. Before deciding, he has her perform in front of an audience for the first time at Rakugo Cafe. After showing her skills with the classic "Scared of Manju" (Note: In "Scared of Manju", a man tricks his roommates into feeding him delicious manjū by convincing them it is the one thing in the world that scares him the most. After he devours the manjū they realize their error and ask what he is really afraid of, to which he replies "a hot cup of tea".) she is well-received by the audience, shocks Shiguma's pupil Guriko, and meets Kaisei, a pupil of Issho Arakawa, the man who expelled her father. Akane is formally taken on as an apprentice after Shiguma meets with her mother for the first time since Akane's father was expelled. Shiguma's pupil Kyoji takes Akane under his guidance and, when she is disappointed with the audience reception after she performs "Praising Children", (Note: In "Praising Children", a man who demands free sake without providing appropriate flattery is given a brief lesson in etiquette; in his subsequent confusion, he makes inappropriate age-related compliments.) calls her rakugo selfish and puts her on the path to learning kibataraki or mindful action; which includes altering your performance to each audience and anticipating what they want ahead of time. He does this by having her work as a waitress at Umi, an izakaya.
2	August 4, 2022	978-4-08-883193-0	October 10, 2023	978-1-9747-4053-6
8. "In Order to Entertain" (喜んでもらう為に, Yorokonde Morau Tame Ni); 9. "After the Delight" (喜びの先, Yorokobi no Saki); 10. "Epitome" (背中, Senaka) (Note: Originally titled "Model" in English when released on Manga Plus.); 11. "Myopic" (短絡的, Tanraku Teki); 12. "The Dreamer" (夢見るあの子, Yumemiru Ano Ko); 13. "Goal and Condition" (目的と条件, Mokuteki to Jōken); 14. "The Type to Hold a Grudge" (根に持つタイプ, Nenimotsu Taipu); 15. "Koguma's Rakugo" (こぐまの落語, Koguma no Rakugo); 16. "The Karaku Cup Begins" (可楽杯開幕, Karaku Hai Kaimaku)
During a performance of "Praising Children" at a retirement home, Akane shocks Kyoji with the kibataraki she has learned. Kyoji performs "Three Men Lose One Ryo". (Note: In "Three Men Lose One Ryo", two prideful men argue over a lost wallet containing three ryō; neither the finder nor loser want to accept it, as spending money was seen as a virtue. To resolve the dispute, a judge adds one ryō to the wallet and splits the total, giving each man two.) In school, Akane's teacher Machiko Iwashimizu is concerned that her student is so firmly set on becoming a rakugoka that she will not even be applying for colleges. After attending a performance by Akane at the urging of Akane's classmate Jumbo Ozaki and seeing how passionate she is about rakugo, Iwashimizu changes her mind and informs Akane of the Karaku Cup, a rakugo competition for students. Akane wants to enter in order to win the prize, a conversation with head judge Issho Arakawa. Master Shiguma allows her to enter but under the condition that she win only with "Jugemu", a story so famous that even people unfamiliar with rakugo know it; meaning it is difficult to get laughs with, and thus never performed in competitions. Akane asks her senpai Koguma Arakawa for help, and he inspires her to research the Edo period. As the first day of the Karaku Cup begins, the unknown Akane draws attention after receiving praise from the emcee, Kaisei.
3	October 4, 2022	978-4-08-883260-9	December 12, 2023	978-1-9747-4098-7
17. "The Karaku Cup Prelims" (可楽杯予選, Karaku Hai Yosen); 18. "Shut It" (せからしか, Sekarashika); 19. "The Karaku Cup Finals" (可楽杯本選, Karaku Hai Honsen); 20. "BM"; 21. "Hikaru's Rakugo" (ひかるの落語, Hikaru no Rakugo); 22. "As A Performer" (表現者として, Hyōgensha Toshite); 23. "Lull" (凪, Nagi); 24. "Infinite Blessings" (寿限り無し, Kotobuki Kagiri Nashi); 25. "The Disappearing Stage" (消える高座, Kieru Kōza)
Akane is one of eight contestants to proceed to the finals of the Karaku Cup, and positions herself as one of the three poised to win. In the finals, Karashi Nerimaya, winner of the last two years, performs his "adapted rakugo", which takes the basic concepts of the classic "Tenshiki" (Note: In "Tenshiki", a doctor asks a senior priest if he has "tenshiki"; feigning knowledge to save face, the priest says no, then tasks a junior priest to learn what it is. Eventually, the junior priest learns it means flatulence, but deliberately misleads his senior into thinking it is a sake cup.) and places them in a modern setting. Hikaru Koragi, a popular voice actress, uses her acting skills to perform "Shibahama", (Note: In "Shibahama", a drunkard goes on a binge fueled by found money; the next morning, hungover and unable to pay his debts after he has lost the wallet, he turns his life around and goes sober. After several industrious years, his wife confesses she turned the wallet over to the authorities that night; he is grateful for her help rather than angry, as their lives have improved.) a heart-warming rakugo, in a theatrical style. After these two performances where the contestants purposefully showed off their strengths, Akane successfully adapts her performance of "Jugemu" to the audience's current mood so that they naturally focus on her story rather than her; she essentially disappears from the stage, showing a deeper connection to the characters' minds and outlooks, just as Master Shiguma wanted her to learn.
4	December 2, 2022	978-4-08-883419-1	February 13, 2024	978-1-9747-4302-5
26. "Where You Belong" (来ていい場所, Kite Ii Basho); 27. "Conversation" (座談会, Zadankai); 28. "I'm Glad" (よかった, Yokatta); 29. "A Wonderful World" (素敵な世界, Suteki na Sekai); 30. "Before Being a Rakugoka" (落語家である前に, Rakugoka de Aru Mae ni); 31. "Zenza Training Begins" (前座修行開幕, Zenza Shugyō Kaimaku); 32. "Yasaka-Tei" (弥栄亭); 33. "A Place of Learning" (修練の場, Shūren no Ba); 34. "Background Listening" (捨て耳, Sute Mimi)
Master Issho, who had been encouraging promising newcomers, declares Akane does not belong in an amateur contest, as he realizes she has studied under Shiguma. As her reward for winning the Karaku Cup, Akane has a private meeting with Issho where she asks why he expelled her father, Shinta. He explains he was protecting the art from weakness, including Shinta's unconfident shin'uchi test performance; Akane thanks him and vows to demonstrate he misjudged her father's art. Shiguma tells Akane that Shinta chose to leave rakugo forever because he could not carry on Shiguma's art. Eight months later, Akane begins zenza performance training at Yasaka-tei, a yose theatre, alongside Karashi, now studying under Enso Sanmeitei, Un'un Kenputei, and the senior (tate) zenza, Asagao Konjakutei. After a stern lecture from odious futatsume Rien Konjakuan, Asagao assigns her to open for Rien.
5	March 3, 2023	978-4-08-883427-6	April 9, 2024	978-1-9747-4334-6
35. "Opening Act" (開口一番, Kaikōichiban); 36. "One Fan's Worth" (扇子一本分, Sensu Ippon-bun); 37. "Rakugo Quest" (落語クエスト, Rakugo Kuesuto); 38. "Manners and Etiquette" (礼儀と作法, Reigi to Sahō); 39. "Ookanban" (大看板, Ōkanban); 40. "The Image of Greatness" (傑物の背, Ketsubutsu no Se); 41. "Sharaku the Unteaching" (師資不承のしゃ楽, Shishibushō no Sharaku); 42. "Evaluation" (値踏み, Nebumi); 43. "Wonder Child" (麒麟児, Kirinji)
After Akane performs a punning "Sango-Jigo" (Note: "Sango-Jigo" is a word play story which relies on the observation that temples have both a mountain name (山号, sango) and a temple name (寺号, jigo); one character, motivated by money, points out mountain and temple names in everyday life.) rakugo which pointedly references their encounter yesterday, an infuriated Rien's retaliation is halted by "wonder child" Rokuro Kashiwaya. As the zenza crew at Yasaka-tei disbands, Asagao, Karashi, and Shiguma encourage Akane to learn more stories from other masters. Hassho Tsubakiya, the first she approaches, declines to teach her "Hirabayashi"; (Note: In "Hirabayashi", an apprentice is asked to deliver a letter, but since he cannot read the address, he seeks help from a series of people who confidently state incorrect answers, leaving him hopelessly confused.) Akane realizes she is earning a bad reputation from her "Sango-Jigo" stunt. She asks to participate in Rokuro's upcoming neta-oroshi event in which each rakugoka is performing a story new to them. Akane watches superstar ookanban master Urara Ransaika perform "Fetching Tea" (お茶汲み, Ochakumi). (Note: In "Fetching Tea", an oiran screams in shock at first seeing a patron because he resembles her lost love, for whom she sold herself to the brothel; she proposes marriage once her contract ends next spring, but he leaves after he realizes she is lying to win his favor. Hearing the story, another man visits her, claiming she resembles his lost love; by the reversal of the story, her deception is uncovered, but she agrees to keep seeing him and fetches more tea.) Upon listening to Akane describe her conflict with Rien, Urara offers to teach her the same story. Urara invites Akane to watch Rokuro perform "The Carpenter's Inquiry"; (Note: In "The Carpenter's Inquiry", a landlord seizes a carpenter's tools after he falls behind on rent; the carpenter's boss admonishes the landlord for his predatory nature. [In a second part, not related in the manga, the dispute is elevated to the courts, where the magistrate fines the landlord for not having a pawnbroker's license.]) Kimihisa Kashio, a reporter for Monthly Rakugo, explains Rokuro earned the "wonder child" nickname by refusing to be cowed by the other performers.
6	June 2, 2023	978-4-08-883492-4	June 11, 2024	978-1-9747-4575-3
44. "First Practice on the Road" (初めての出稽古, Hajimete no Degeiko); 45. "Two Steps" (二つの手順(ステップ), Futatsu no Suteppu); 46. "Date" (デート, Dēto); 47. "Fetching Tea" (お茶汲み, Ochakumi); 48. "Fetching Tea, Part 2" (お茶汲み②, Ochakumi 2); 49. "Fetching Tea, Part 3" (お茶汲み③, Ochakumi 3); 50. "Master's Desire" (師匠の望み, Shishō no Nozomi); 51. "Goldfish" (金魚割り, Kingyowari); 52. "Embodiment" (体現者, Taigensha); 53. "Fascinating News" (おもしろい報せ, Omoshiroi Shirase)
At their first formal lesson, Master Urara says Akane is not suited for the part of the oiran; to win Urara's approval to perform "Fetching Tea", Akane literally dresses as a courtesan and later goes on an initially awkward date with her former classmate, Jumbo Ozaki. At the neta-oroshi event, Akane's delivery is similar to Urara's, but the difference in their ages make the oiran sound false, not seductive; however, the story pivots after the oiran's deception is exposed, and Master Hassho, watching from the side of the stage, recognizes the realism of Akane's portrayal. Acknowledging her resilience, Hassho agrees to teach "Hirabayashi". In a flashback, Kaisei's childhood struggles and his connection to Master Issho are shown before he performs "The Death of Toyoshiga" (Note: In "The Death of Toyoshiga", the eponymous Toyoshiga, a master of the shamisen, falls in love with her apprentice Shinkichi, but grows jealous of his relationship with fellow student Ohisa, who is closer to his age. She dies by suicide, cursing Shinkichi.) at an event, following an opening story by Akane; backstage, he tells her about an upcoming four-performer event in which three have already been chosen, and the fourth slot will go to the winner of the annual zenza renseikai training event, judged by Master Ikken Arakawa.
7	August 4, 2023	978-4-08-883592-1	August 13, 2024	978-1-9747-4623-1
54. "Zenza Renseikai" (前座錬成会); 55. "The Vibe of the Renseikai" (錬成会の空気, Renseikai no Kūki); 56. "She's Here" (彼女がいる, Kanojo ga Iru); 57. "The Rakugo Swamp" (落語の沼, Rakugo no Numa); 58. "Framework of the Art" (芸の骨格, Gei no Kokkaku); 59. "A Difficult Choice" (難しい三択, Muzukashī Santaku); 60. "Only One Side" (たった一面, Tatta Ichimen); 61. "Time Machine" (タイムマシン, Taimu Mashin); 62. "Judging Standards" (審査基準, Shinsa Kijun)
The renseikai event includes a preliminary round with 18 zenza, with four advancing to a final evaluation one month later. Maikeru volunteers to tutor Akane if she makes the finals. From the preliminary round, Akane advances with "Hirabayashi", as does Kaichi, a former salesman now studying under Master Issho; Zenmai, apprentice to Zensho; and, in a surprise, Hikaru with "The Miller's Torment", (Note: In "The Miller's Torment", Tokubei, a rice miller, visits Maruyama, an oiran, but runs out of money. He decides to earn more by ringing a bell, damning him to eternal torment after death; when the sum is less than expected, he rationalizes it as the milling fee.) who kept her studies under Ikken secret until that day. Maikeru offers three stories to Akane, and she chooses "Changing Time" (替り目, Kawari-me), (Note: In "Changing Time", a drunken husband and suffering wife engage in gentle banter after he returns following a night of drinking; he demands food but she has eaten it all, so she offers to purchase oden for him. Thinking she has left, he verbalizes how grateful he is for her, but is chagrined to realize she overheard him when she re-enters almost immediately. While she is buying the meal, he accidentally starts a chaotic party at home.) because he learned it from Shinta. To better understand her father's art, Akane asks those who knew him, including her mom, what Shinta was like. At the finals, Zenmai performs "The Stubborn Moxibustion" (Note: In "The Stubborn Moxibustion", one man brags about his tolerance for moxibustion but his friend is dismissive, lighting a large moxa on his own arm, comparing the feat to Ishikawa Goemon, who was boiled alive. However, the friend is unable to tolerate it and mutters that Goemon must have felt quite hot.) first, receiving a total score of 75/100, which is the sum of three professional judges (two rakugoka and one critic), the in-person audience, and an on-line audience, each of which can award up to 20 points.
8	October 4, 2023	978-4-08-883691-1	October 8, 2024	978-1-9747-4893-8
63. "The Worst Compatibility" (相性最悪, Aishō Saiaku); 64. "This Is So Stupid" (くだらんね, Kuradanne); 65. "Most of All" (一番は, Ichiban wa); 66. "Let's Forget About It" (忘れようか, Wasureyō ka); 67. "Still That Girl" (あの日のまま, Ano Hi no Mama); 68. "When Feelings Get Too Strong" (強すぎる思い, Tsuyosugiru Omoi); 69. "Dad's Magic" (おっ父の魔法, Ottō no Mahō); 70. "The Rakugoka Shinta Arakawa" (落語家 阿良川志ん太, Rakugoka Arakawa Shinta); 71. "Resolution" (解像度, Kaizōdo)
Kaichi goes next, performing "Golden Bamboo" (Note: In "Golden Bamboo", the stock character Yotaro is placed in charge of his uncle's store, where he follows directions too literally and is confused by indecipherable instructions from a fast-talking man with a strong Kamigata accent; Yotaro refuses to buy the merchandise using a homonym which literally means frog.) by aiming to please the audience and drawing on his experience; backstage, Akane hears echoes of Shinta's motivations in Kaichi, who scores 91 points. Before she goes on, Hikaru tells Akane she became a rakugoka to beat her. Hikaru performs "The Hanami Revenge" (Note: In "The Hanami Revenge", four men stage a production for a flower viewing party (hanami); two, playing brothers, will fight a third, their father's murderer, until the fourth, a traveling pilgrim, calms the tensions and starts a celebration. The first three start their needlessly realistic battle while awaiting the pilgrim, who was waylaid; when a passing samurai offers to join their righteous revenge, the trio are frightened and run away together, astonishing onlookers.) in the heretical "Eight Blind Men" style, using distinct voices for each character. She earns 93 points, including a perfect 20 from the streaming audience. Akane closes out the set with "Changing Time"; during her low-key performance, she realizes she was charmed by the vulnerability in Shinta's art, which she uses to deliver the in-person audience into the story. At his wife's insistence, Tohru is watching Akane online while traveling for work; he protests rhetorically about the blurry video quality, through his tears.
9	December 4, 2023	978-4-08-883791-8	December 10, 2024	978-1-9747-4939-3
72. "Changing Time" (替り目, Kawarime); 73. "And the Winner Is..." (勝者は, Shō-sha wa); 74. "The Shikisai Festival" (志喜彩祭, Shikisai Sai); 75. "The Shikisai Festival, Part 2" (志喜彩祭②, Shikisai Sai 2); 76. "The Shikisai Festival, Part 3" (志喜彩祭③, Shikisai Sai 3); 77. "I'm Burning Up" (燃えてますよ, Moetemasuyo); 78. "A Shallow Man" (軽薄な男, Keihaku na Otoko); 79. "The Man Who Will Be Your Guidepost" (標に成り得る男, Shirube ni Nari Uru Otoko); 80. "Chocho Konjakutei the Ookanban" (大看板・今昔亭ちょう朝, Ookanban Konjakutei Chōchō)
Akane places second with 92 points; her first defeat leaves her feeling sad. Although she received better marks from every in-person voter, the streaming audience provided the winning margin. At a local festival held jointly by the Shiguma school and his neighborhood, Shiguma's apprentices operate competing booths; Akane encounters Master Shiguma, who advises her to "tighten the loincloth (fundoshi) of her heart" and enjoy herself before she helps Guriko at a yakitori stand. During the festival rakugo performance, she opens for Guriko, whose "The Careless Nail" (Note: In "The Careless Nail", after a couple move into a new home, she asks her husband to put in a nail to hang up her broom; fearing the too-long nail could have affected their neighbors, she admonishes him. The absent-minded husband visits the neighbors; seeing the tip of the nail above the head of a Buddha altar, he asks if they also use a broom here.) is received well; he later vows to stay ahead of her as a role model and asks Maikeru for help. At a corporate anniversary event, Karashi recites the company's history in the kōdan style before reuniting with Asagao, Akane, and Un'un at Yasaka-tei to celebrate Asagao's futatsume promotion plans. Akane, who has been strategizing how to secure a recommendation from one of the Arakawa Arch Four, is given an old flyer by Asagao, which advertised an event held jointly by his master Chocho Konjakutei with Shinta and Taizen Arakawa. Akane and Karashi are invited to watch Chocho perform, who is the youngest ever to reach ookanban. Hassho helps Chocho sneak into the venue and tells Akane she reminds him of Chocho.
10	March 4, 2024	978-4-08-883822-9	February 11, 2025	978-1-9747-5176-1
81. "Chocho Konjakutei the Ookanban, Part 2" (大看板・今昔亭ちょう朝②, Ookanban Konjakutei Chōchō 2); 82. "Art of Sunshine" (“陽”の芸, "Yō" no Gei); 83. "Cho-Han Dice" (丁半博打, Chōhan Bakuchi); 84. "Present Location" (現在地, Genzaichi); 85. "My Plan" (私の秘策, Watashi no Hisaku); 86. "New Breeze" (新風会, Shinpūkai); 87. "External Validation" (外付けの自信, Sotozuke no Jishin); 88. "Got Me Licked" (舐めやがって, Nameyagatte); 89. "Tanuki Stories" (狸の噺, Tanuki no Hanashi)
Based on a roll of the dice backstage, Chocho performs "One for Show" (Note: In "One For Show", a retired gambler takes over as dealer for choboichi, in which bettors guess the value of a rolled die hidden beneath a cup. Apparently unnoticed by the dealer, the die has escaped the cup, showing one pip, and the bettors eagerly bid on one; after collecting the bets, the dealer archly notes the visible die was "one for show" and gathers it, preparing for the actual roll.) and Hassho wryly notes he is "a born gambler". At a celebratory afterparty, Asagao announces his plans to hold a zenza study event monthly and invites Akane and Karashi to participate. Chocho gambles with the zenza over a rigged game of chō-han for a chance to learn a story. Separately, Guriko asks permission from Shiguma to continue his studies in Osaka. Asagao is challenged to sell all 50 seats at the Rakugo Cafe for his study events, but only four show up at the debut. Taizen refuses to meet with Chocho, who asks if Taizen still believes Shinta's expulsion was Taizen's fault. Akane draws a young audience to the study events by performing "Tanuki Money" (狸の札, Tanuki no Satsu) (Note: In "Tanuki Money", Hachigoro rescues a tanuki who offers to repay his debts by shapeshifting into money. Despite some preliminary transformation glitches, the debt is settled; the tanuki returns to Hachigoro later with more money after escaping from the debt collector's purse.) in a tanuki costume. Asago tells Rokuru he is using the study events to select an opener. At the "Arakawa New Breeze" futatsume event featuring Hikari, Yuzen, Koguma, and Kaisei, Koguma revives "Giboshi" (擬宝珠), (Note: In "Giboshi", a young man confesses his love of licking metal to a family retainer, saying his dream is to lick the giboshi finial of Sensō-ji. Revealing the secret to the man's parents, the retainer is shocked to learn it is a family trait. In the end, the father puts up a ladder at the temple for his son, ruefully noting "he's got me licked.") a story whose oral tradition had died out.
11	May 2, 2024	978-4-08-884023-9	April 8, 2025	978-1-9747-5279-9
90. "This Breeze Feels Nice" (この風は心地いい, Kono Kaze wa Kokochiī); 91. "Errands to Run" (用事があるんで, Yōjigārunde); 92. "Specialty" (十八番, Ohako); 93. "My Words" (私の言葉, Watashi no Kotoba); 94. "This is a Major Event" (事件だよ, Jikendayo); 95. "It's Been A While" (久しぶり, Hisashiburi); 96. "It's Just Rakugo" (たかが落語だ, Takaga Rakugo da); 97. "Heartwarming" (微笑ましい, Hohoemashi); 98. "Art and Nin" (芸と仁, Gei to Nin)
At the fourth study event, Asagao performs "The Backward Rickshaw" (Note: In "The Backward Rickshaw", a man seeking a ride at night to Ueno boards a rickshaw whose driver is elderly and slow but insists he will reach Ueno Station before the first train leaves; the passenger jumps off, disgusted. He then asks another driver if he is fast; the driver takes off running before the man can board; after catching the ride, they end up in Sendai but the driver says he will be in Ueno before the first train.) and invites Akane to open his futatsume debut event, which will include the ookanban Chocho and Taizen. Chocho asks if Taizen will give Akane a futatsume recommendation which Taizen, who apprenticed under Zensho, has never done and Zensho, who has a grudge against Shiguma, forbids him from doing so. For the event, Chocho teaches "Tanuki Dice" (狸賽, Tanuki Sai) (Note: In "Tanuki Dice", a tanuki tries to repay a debt by transforming into a loaded die to help a man cheat at choboichi. After the man bets on five, he prays out loud for an appearance from Tenjin, a spirit whose crest features the five-petal plum blossom, as a hint to the tanuki; when the cup is lifted, the animal literally has transformed into a miniature Tenjin.) to Akane but asks that she refrain from using Edo dialect for training. Over drinks, Chocho asks Shiguma (VI) about the art of Shiguma's and Issho's master, also named Shiguma (V), which Shinta was pursuing. The upcoming debut event, which Kimihisa notes is the first to include members of the Rakugo Federation and Arakawa School since the mass expulsion, is highly anticipated and the "National Treasure", rakugoka Miroku Kashiwaya, attends. To avoid disobeying his master, Taizen calls to say he will be late enough to miss Akane's performance, but Tohru convinces him to show up on time instead. Akane's "Tanuki Dice" draws on her own personality, rather than just the structures of rakugo, for the first time.
12	July 4, 2024	978-4-08-884114-4	June 10, 2025	978-1-9747-5573-8
99. "The Other Effect" (もう一つの効果, Mōhitotsu no Kōka); 100. "The Rakugoverse" (落語ヴァース, Rakugouāsu); 101. "Exactly" (だからだよ, Dakaradayo); 102. "The Furious" (怒髪天, Dohatsuten); 103. "Tension and Release" (緊緩, Kinkan); 104. "The Promise of the Past" (あの日の約束, Ano Hi no Yakusoku); 105. "Butt Out" (口出し無用, Kuchidashi Muyō); 106. "Today's Star" (今日の主役, Kyō no Shuyaku); 107. "Old Name" (昔の名, Mukashi no Na)
Akane plays with the structure and plot of "Tanuki Dice", winning a warm reaction from the crowd before Taizen performs "The Golden Daikoku" (黄金の大黒, Kogane no Daikoku) (Note: In "The Golden Daikoku", a landlord calls together his tenants, who fear he will ask for unpaid rent; however, he invites them to celebrate the discovery of a buried golden Daikoku statue. They attend one at a time, sharing the same crested haori jacket. During the party, the landlord notices Daikoku preparing to leave and asked if they were being too noisy; the deity instead was inviting more friends to join the fun, including Ebisu.) to rapturous applause. Backstage, Akane speaks with Taizen; as Zensho interrupts to remind Taizen of his order, Taizen announces he will give Akane a futatsume recommendation and Shiguma orders Zensho to leave. Outside, Zensho's tantrum is interrupted by Maikeru, who tells him his shin'uchi promotion test has been set to take place in a month. Akane confesses she is having fun with rakugo to Tohru. In a private meeting, Miroku calls Shiguma by his student name, Rokuen Kashiwaya, noting that Issho (Kisoba) and Kyoji (Kyoichi) also were brought up in the Kashiwaya School; Miroku also draws similarities between Akane and Kiroku Kashiwaya, the former Shiguma (V).
13	September 4, 2024	978-4-08-884165-6	August 12, 2025	978-1-9747-5595-0
108. "Patient" (我慢, Gaman); 109. "Model" (範, Han); 110. "Senior Apprentice" (一番弟子, Ichiban Deshi); 111. "Too Shallow" (軽過ぎる, Karusugiru); 112. "Floundering" (ジリ貧, Jirihin); 113. "His True Self" (本来の姿, Honrai no Sugata); 114. "Yin and Yang" (陰陽, Inyō); 115. "A Stand" (ケジメ, Kejime); 116. "Judges' Results" (審査結果, Shinsa Kekka)
Tagging along at his request, Akane and Maikeru perform everything but rakugo as he prepares for his shin'uchi test, the first to be held by the Arakawa School since the expulsion. Zensho privately predicts failure and poisons the crowd's mood by reminding everyone about the prior disaster during the opening remarks. During the test, Maikeru chooses to perform "Time's Up", (Note: In "Time's Up", traditionally, an incense stick is used to measure the time for a geisha visit. A besotted man spends lavishly to meet one named Koito, embezzling from his family business. As an intervention, he is locked in a storeroom for 100 days; Koito writes daily, but the letters abruptly stop after 80 days. Upon his release, he returns to her okiya where he learns she died of lovesickness; he prays at her memorial and hears his favorite song playing from a shamisen, which stops as the altar incense burns out.) making an initial light, joking impression, but he pivots to a tone befitting the tragic, emotional ninjo-banashi, which reflects his journey as the senior apprentice after Shinta left; his performance leaves most of the audience, including Zensho, in tears. Maikeru is promoted on a 3–1 vote, with Issho dissenting because some members of the audience were left unmoved.
14	November 1, 2024	978-4-08-884284-4	November 4, 2025	978-1-9747-5879-1
117. "Really Shaping Up" (様になったな, Sama ni Natta na); 118. "I'm Counting On You" (任せたぞ, Makasetazo); 119. "A Fully-fledged Rakugoka" (一端の落語家, Ippashi no Rakugoka); 120. "Walk the Path" (歩む道, Ayumu Michi); 121. "Thanks to Master" (師匠のおかげ, Shishō no Okage); 122. "Essence of the Shiguma School" (志ぐま一門らしさ, Shiguma Ichimon Rashisa); 123. "Shiguma Onstage" (志ぐまの高座, Shiguma no Kōza); 124. "Room for Imagination" (想像の余地, Sōzō no Yochi); 125. "The Art of Subtraction" (❝引き算❞の芸, ❝Hikizan❝ no Gei)
Standards to become an Arakawa shin'uchi have risen to the point where the performance must be worthy of an ookanban, following an incident involving Master Issho. While researching Issho's master Shiguma Arakawa (V) (Kiroku Kashiwaya), Rokuro discovers Shiguma (V) had performed an unfinished story later named "Shiguma's Art", which had been passed down within Kashiwaya exclusively until Kiroku/Shiguma (V) broke away to form the Arakawa School. Four months later, as Akane prepares for her own futatsume event, Shiguma (VI) asks her to open for his upcoming solo event. Karashi, Hikaru, and Akane renew their now-friendly rivalry. At the solo event, Akane performs "First Tenjin" (Note: In "First Tenjin", a man takes his son to the first Tenjin festival of the year (January 25), and the son's repeated requests are denied by the father until he buys first candy, then a kite. On the way home, the man stops to fly the kite but refuses to let his son take over; the boy mutters that if he had known this was going to happen at the festival, he wouldn't have taken his father.) in gratitude for Shiguma VI's life lessons before he goes on with his specialty "God of Death".
15	February 4, 2025	978-4-08-884431-2	March 10, 2026	978-1-9747-6104-3
126. "Afterparty" (打ち上げ, Uchiage); 127. "Impossible Task" (ムチャブリ, Muchaburi); 128. "Time at Last" (いよいよ, Iyoiyo); 129. "Is This Rakugo?" (落語ですか?, Rakugo desu ka?); 130. "It's All A Mess" (ぐちゃぐちゃ, Guchagucha); 131. "Dismantled" (解体, Kaitai); 132. "Thinking Back" (思い出す, Omoidasu); 133. "There's Always Tomorrow" (明日がある, Ashitagāru); 134. "There Is Everything" (何でもある, Nani Demo aru)
Shiguma (VI) offers to teach Akane "Shiguma's Art", which Issho and Rokuru are also pursuing. He explains to Akane that "Shiguma's Art" is an unfinished framework she will fill in with her futatsume experiences to win Issho's acceptance; before he can give more details, he suffers a heart attack and doctors discover he has throat cancer, threatening his voice. At the hospital, Issho decides to disband the Shiguma (VI) branch and announces he will take over Akane's apprenticeship; Urara defuses the tense situation and leaves with Akane, who asks Urara about Shiguma (V). In a flashback, Urara first met Issho and Shiguma (VI) in 1964; they were delivery boys for Soba Shop Kikuhiko who helped her during a confrontation with the son of a kumichō, the captain of a yakuza family. The kumichō returns and beats the boys, stopping at the request of Kiroku Kashiwaya, a regular patron of the soba shop, because Kiroku saved his life at Rabaul decades ago. They attend Kiroku's performance of "Time Soba", (Note: In "Time Soba", a man watches another soba shop patron cheat on his bill by smoothly asking for the time while counting out coins; impressed, he later tries the same trick but ends up paying extra instead due to his lack of skill.) where Issho is deeply moved and vows to follow Kiroku.
16	April 4, 2025	978-4-08-884449-7	May 12, 2026	978-1-9747-6335-1
135. "Apprenticing" (弟子入り, Deshiiri); 136. "Still Alive" (死んでない, Shin Denai); 137. "To Hell With It" (しゃあねえか, Sha anē ka); 138. "Chance to Shine" (晴れ舞台, Hare Butai); 139. "Raise the Flag" (旗上げ, Hata Age); 140. "Tough Cookie" (強か, Shitataka); 141. "Zenza Training Complete" (前座修業閉幕, Zenza Shūgyō Heimaku); One-Shot. "Tatarashido" (タタラシドー, Tatarashidō)
Kiroku eventually accepts the new apprentices Kisoba and Rokuen. However, his master Miroku Kashiwaya (IV) bars them from performing for two years because of the fight; defiant, Kiroku schedules the zenza to open a Kashiwaya school event. Miroku IV offers the prestigious myoseki name Miroku to Kiroku if he expels his pupils, or be expelled himself, but Kiroku ultimately chooses the ruffians. After Kisoba debuts with "Time Soba" and is showered in applause, Miroku IV expels Kiroku and his students. At hanashi-zuka, a shrine to rakugo stories and performers purged during the war, Kiroku announces he will start a new school and revive the myoseki rakugoka name Shiguma Arakawa as the fifth to carry it, ending the flashback. Akane realizes that "Shiguma's Art" must have divided the two apprentices. Maikeru calls the Shiguma apprentices together and vows to reinstate the branch when he reaches ookanban. Issho forbids Akane from "Shiguma's Art" while studying with him; in return, she asks about Shiguma (V). Three years later, she is living in Paris.
17	June 4, 2025	978-4-08-884559-3	August 11, 2026	978-1-9747-6570-6
142. "New Path" (新たな歩み, Aratana Ayumi); 143. "Very Scary" (こわいこわい, Kowai kowai); 144. "I Have Something" (在る, Aru); 145. "Sit Back and Watch" (見てなよ, Mitenayo); 146. "I'm Back" (帰ってきた, Kaettekita); 147. "Maybe All-Powerful" (最強かもよ, Saikyō Kamo yo); 148. "The Futatsume Arc Begins" (二ツ目編 開演, Futatsume-hen Kaien); 149. "Release" (解く, Hodoku); 150. "Ignorance" (お門違い, Okadochigai)
Shiguma has retired; Karashi and Hikaru have been promoted to futatsume but Akane canceled her debut and was sent to Europe by Issho, staying with Emilie Dupont, the granddaughter of Gakumon Sensei. Feeling homesick, she won her first, private audience of one with "Jugemu" despite the language barrier. After Kashio catches her performance of "Scared of Manju" in Paris, she says she will perform at Yasaka-tei in March. Back in Tokyo, Akane suffers from motion sickness and relies on Taizen's newest apprentice, Taison, to get to the theater, where she receives a chilly reception from the zenza after Rien, still nursing the old grudge, visited to spoil her return. Akane performs "Yawning Lessons", (Note: In "Yawning Lessons", a man convinces his friend to accompany him to a new school for yawning; while he struggles with the instructions, his friend falls asleep. After waking up, the friend crossly calls the lesson boring and yawns, causing the tutor to exclaim the friend is quite talented.) causing the entire audience to yawn sympathetically. Gakumon wanted to expose her to foreign culture in Paris, but Akane approached it as a practical lesson to strengthen her fundamentals. Emilie sees Akane's strength blossom; Gakumon calls her performance "pure freedom"; Rien tears his hair in frustration as his plan fails and Akane's triumphant return spreads over social media. She meets Ikken and then Issho, who asks her what she learned abroad and tells her Shiguma's Art requires mastering three stories: "Shibahama", "God of Death", and an unrevealed title, but adds that it is an illusion not worth pursuing. Akane reaffirms her commitment to become a shin'uchi and asks Shomei Tsubakiya to instruct her in "God of Death", but he refuses.
18	September 4, 2025	978-4-08-884650-7	November 10, 2026	978-1-9747-6650-5
151. "Customs" (決めごと, Kimegoto); 152. "His Intent" (彼の真意, Kare no Shin'i); 153. "Suffer" (損なう, Sokonau); 154. "No Fun" (燃えん, Moen); 155. "Huff" (はぁ, Hā); 156. "Exceptional" (頭抜けてる, Zunuke Teru); 157. "Just Talk" (口だけ, Kuchidake); 158. "Win It All" (取りにいく, Tori ni Iku); 159. "You've Grown" (伸びたね, Nobita ne)
Hassho warned Akane that Shomei would be difficult; Akane times his performance of "Shiwai-ya", (Note: In "Shiwai-ya", men compete over their frugality, often going to extreme measures to save money, including a miser who, when presented with a bill for enjoying the scents of cooking, pays with the sound of jingling coins.) demonstrating his "clockwork" precision, which he believes is incompatible with her improvisational style. After she convinces him she can adapt, he agrees to teach her. She enters the Zuiun Prize, a new competition which Shomei will judge, and Hikaru and Karashi also join, setting up a rematch of the Karaku Cup. In a flashback, Enso sent Karashi to learn from Chocho, inspiring Karashi to became the first rakugoka to reach the finals of the Z-1 Grand Prix (Note: This competition is based on the actual M-1 Grand Prix manzai competition) for best comedian in Japan. Taison worries while watching Akane perform; when Issho forbids her from making the audience laugh, she begins to doubt herself, but a chance encounter with Kaichi renews her determination. Performing at Umi, Akane cannot help but perform in her own free-wheeling style. Miku, the owner of the izakaya, prepares a hiyajiru miso rice soup, declaring the chef must win over the diner by being true to their nature, inspiring Akane. As the Zuiun event starts, Hikaru and Karashi draw all the pre-show attention and their chilly standoff is defused when Akane arrives, vowing to win.
19	November 4, 2025	978-4-08-884739-9	—	—
160. "She's Here Today" (彼女もいる, Kanojo mo Iru); 161. "She Really Could Win" (勝っちまうんじゃ, Katchimau n ja); 162. "Better Than That" (こんなもんじゃないだろ, Kon'na mon Janai Daro); 163. "The Final" (本選, Honsen); 164. "It's Plain As Day" (誰が見ても明らか, Dare ga Mite mo Akiraka); 165. "I Didn't Realize" (思っていたより, Omotte ita Yori); 166. "Glow" (煌かせる, Kirameka Seru); 167. "Leave It All Out There" (差し出す覚悟, Sashidasu Kakugo); 168. "I've Gotten Stronger" (私は強くなった, Watashi wa Tsuyoku Natta)
In a flashback, Akane tells Taison she is aiming for ookanban status with a fun performance which she compares to the amusement park Hanayashiki. Akane shifts styles in rapid succession, from tragedy to comedy and gourmand, but places fifth, barely adequate for the final round of judging. Akane still vows to beat both Karashi and Hikaru; Kashio expresses confidence. Zenmai kicks off the final round with a rousing performance of "Former Dog" (Note: In "Former Dog", a white dog prays devoutly, wishing to become human; after the wish is granted, he becomes a servant to a retired man who was seeking someone funny and playful, but his old canine habits prove hard to break.) that wins high marks from two of the three judges, but Shomei marks him down for focusing on the audience instead of the art. Saryu Kenputei goes second and is similarly dismissed by Shomei. Hikaru performs "Okiku's Plates", skillfully building tension and releasing it, earning relieved laughter during the tragic performance. Ikken told Hikaru that when she started, he didn't realize she was motivated by competition, rather than the art; she told her agent that she was driven by anger, starting with her mother's drunken doubts about her childhood ambition to be a seiyuu and extending to the fans who only saw her as a pretty face, which pushed her into rakugo. Hikaru wraps up her performance, placing first; Shomei bestows rare praise and she realizes she is no longer seeking approval, silently praising Akane for making her stronger. Karashi takes the stage.
20	January 5, 2026	978-4-08-884811-2	—	—
169. "False Classic" (偽りの古典, Itsuwari no Koten); 170. "The Form of Sanmeitei" (三明亭の型, Sanmeitei no Kata); 171. "The Art of the Exterior" (外形の極意, Gaikei no Gokui); 172. "A Fool for Rakugo" (落語バカ, Rakugo baka); 173. "Different Standards" (信じる正義, Shinjiru Seigi); 174. "Don't Waste It" (無駄に遣うな, Muda ni Tsukau na); 175. "Can You Reach?" (至れるかな？, Itareru ka na?); 176. "What I Should Have My Eye On" (目を向けるべきは, Me o Mukerubeki wa); 177. "Even Deeper" (更に奥, Sarani Oku)
Karashi performs "Monkey See, Monkey Do", (Note: In "Monkey See, Monkey Do", the publisher of an unscrupulous newspaper plans to reveal the scandalous infidelity of a popular actor, asking the boy reporter Sadakichi to find evidence. The publisher, a notorious skinflint, gives him only a few coins for the investigation, which Sadakichi instead spends on a kabuki play, Yoshitsune and the Thousand Cherry Trees. The next day, when he demands to hear what the boy saw, Sadakichi panics and lies, describing a scene from the play with absurd details. After a brief scolding, the publisher laughs and says the story was an obvious lie, but entertaining nevertheless; Sadakichi wryly says he learned from his master.) an original story about a modern adultery scandal, wrapped in the setting of a classic rakugo tale. Karashi earned praise from demanding master Enso Sanmeitei, as the only student who grasped the vital points of the entire story, and Enso handed down the secret "exterior outlook" of the Sanmeitei school: capturing the mental state of a character by imitating physical acts. Karashi tells Hikaru he chose an original "false classic" to create a legacy; initially, he did not intend to become a rakugoka, but learned discipline and purpose from the menial zenza training tasks. During the judging, Karashi says he used an anachronistic term to help the modern listener better understand and reach a broad audience; Shomei adjusts his score higher and he seizes a narrow lead of two points over Hikaru. As Akane begins "Shiwai-ya", the initial jokes draw out the audience's amusement. Karashi realizes the classic material is naturally funny without embellishment, which is the lesson Issho intended for Akane. She realizes that Shomei's "sight" is the ability to view herself from the audience, ensuring her actions match her intentions, as explained by Zeami centuries ago. This allows Akane to figuratively disappear from the stage by matching the audience's energy, immersing them fully into the story. Backstage, Issho watches her performance, allowing himself a tight grin.
21	April 3, 2026	978-4-08-884897-6	—	—
178. "Purify by Straining" (濾し澄ます, Koshi Sumasu); 179. "Hell Yeah!!" (っつしゃあ!!, Ttsu sha a!!); 180. "I Wanted to Measure" (測りたかった, Hakaritakatta); 181. "Zuiun Effect" (特需, Tokuju); 182. "Reward" (労い, Negirai); 183. "Card and Time" (手札と時間, Tefuda to Jikan); 184. "Drawing Capability" (集客力, Shūkyaku-ryoku); 185. "Coldness" (寒さ, Samusa); 186. "The Art of The Personal" (己れ派, Onorere ha); 187. "Make Up for the Waiting" (待たせた分, Mata Seta Bun)
Akane finishes and passes out. Shomei acknowledges her mastery in becoming "only rakugo" and Karashi ruefully exclaims at his misfortune. Akane wakes up in the infirmary, where Shomei congratulates her win; as a "craftsman" she focused on the story instead of herself. He agrees to teach her "God of Death" but advises her to mind her health. At an after party, Karashi asks why she was so exhausted; to enter the mindset of a miser, she slept on the beach instead of her hotel. Master Shomei's scoring recognized those appropriate for futatsume (70s), those possibly ready for shin'uchi (80s; Hikaru and Karashi), and those ready to specialize (90s; Akane). On the beach, after the party, Karashi and Hikaru privately say Akane remains far ahead of them by demonstrating "show [the story] off as it is", an exceedingly difficult feat. With the Zuiun Prize win, Akane is busy professionally. Kaisei instructs her in the customs of the Arakawa school before a dinner meeting with Issho, where he doles out sparing praise and offers a reward: he will grant one request, later; he invites her to the Isshokai, an event for his apprentices held annually on November 23, the anniversary of the death of Shiguma (V). Akane and Kaisei will plan the daytime schedule. At the Rakugo Cafe, Karashi says rakugoka now must draw an audience of 1000 before they can take the shin'uchi promotion test, which Kaisei took and failed. To learn more, Akane goes to Kaisei's solo event, where he performs "Glaring Back" (Note: In "Glaring Back" a couple hide in the closet to avoid their unending stream of debt collectors while a man they hired to excuse their debts drives the collectors away by silently glaring at them.) in his "personal" style, drawing on desperate childhood memories to chill the audience. At his promotion event, Kaisei had performed "God of Death", and Issho followed by performing the same story, pointedly questioning whether Kaisei was his equal. Issho pushes those he admires most, but Kaisei took Issho's actions personally, fostering hate not growth. According to Ikken, Kaisei is being groomed to be Issho's successor and Gakumon-sensei adds that Kaisei's ferocity reminds him of Master Issho. Akane and Kaisei bond over their similarities and they both will perform "God of Death" in their respective styles at the upcoming Isshoken; he promises to explain the feud between Shiguma and Issho if she prevails.
22	June 4, 2026	978-4-08-885087-0	—	—
188. "Triplicate Training" (三遍稽古, Sanben Keiko); 189. "The Flavor of God of Death" (死神の醍醐味, Shinigami no Daigomi); 190. "What Is Death" (死とは, Shi to wa); 191. "Stain" (汚点, Oten); 192. "The Form You've Got Now" (今ある型, Ima aru Kata); 193. "Weaves a World" (世界を編む, Sekai o Amu); 194. "The Audience" (お客席, O Kyakuseki); 195. "The Isshokai Leaves Port" (一生會出航, Isshōkai Shukkō); 196. "Issho Theater" (一生劇場, Isshō Gekijō)
Akane and Rokuro learn Master Shomei's "God of Death" by watching him perform in Hakata. Opening for Shomei, Akane performs "Tenshiki" and Rokuro praises her progress. Surprisingly, Shomei has a light, comic take on "God of Death"; afterward, he warns Akane she will not grasp the performance if she only studies the story. Restless, she asks about his master and father, Shomei (VIII), whose temperament is demonstrated during "Testicle Doctor", (Note: The titular "Testicle Doctor" uses the power of laughter by flashing his testicles while providing serious medical advice.) showing his popular appeal; Shiguma (VI) was the only one who sought out Shomei (VIII)'s version of "God of Death". Akane catches a glimpse of the God of Death. By the end of their training, Shomei (IX) praises Rokuro and Akane. With a free day, they tour Fukuoka and Akane watches Rokuro deliver "Unburied" (Note: In "Unburied", the stock character Hachigoro sees his elderly neighbor, a notorious misogynist, with a young girl. The neighbor explains that when he went river fishing at Mukojima, he found an unburied skeleton; in sympathy, he said a prayer and as a reward, the ghost of the woman came to thank him. Hachigoro eagerly seeks another set of exposed bones, but attracts the unwanted attention of a living man instead.) in his signature "song" style which invokes "the power of the phrase": using the audience's excitement to heighten his passion; Akane will try to use the same feedback in her craft. Kaisei's study session with Ikken is a success, but Ikken wonders whether Kaisei will prevail. Akane returns to Tokyo in high spirits. Three months later, Akane boards the ship for the Isshokai cruise which departs on November 22. A welcome dinner with light entertainment kicks off the two-day event. Issho proves an affable host; Akane vows to seize the spotlight.
23	August 4, 2026	978-4-08-885133-4	—	—
197. "A Proud Airhead" (おバカ上等, O Baka Jōtō); 198. "House Dance" (お家芸, Oiegei); 199. "I'm Going to Surpass You" (超えてやる, Koete Yaru); 200. "God of Death Duel Duet" (死神双宴, Shinigami Souen); 201. "A Death to Remember" (派手な死に様, Hadena Shinizama); 202. "Transformation" (化ける, Bakeru); 203. "Session" (セッション, Sesshon); 204. "The Effortless Realm" (天衣無縫, Ten’i Muhō); 205. "Almost Like The Old" (まるで嘗ての, Marude Katsute no)
Kaisei counsels patience, advising Akane to extract her revenge on stage. The emcee announces an unexpected schedule change: Akane will be going onstage as a special, impromptu guest star. She and Kaisei stage a fierce kappore dance battle with fluid precision and synchronization. Privately, Kaisei vows to show Akane does not belong in the Issho school, while Akane believes she has caught and surpassed him. As Akane prepares to kick off the "God of Death" Duel Duet, Zensho once again poisons the mood, but Akane and Kaichi are unfazed. Akane's take on the classic story (Note: In Akane's "God of Death", a wife berates her worthless husband, saying he should hit his head on a block of tofu and die. After he proposes to give her a death to remember, a timid god of death appears, promising to help him tie a hangman's knot. The shinigami helps him win riches and fame, and when an attractive woman solicits his attention, the little god asks to play as well. As usual, the doctor overreaches, motivated by greed, and tries to bribe the god with gold, which is rejected. When they enter the cave of candles, he is given the chance to transfer his guttering flame; he succeeds and then sneezes, extinguishing the candle, showing how death is capricious and inevitable.) results in a wide range of audience responses, from amusement to horror. Rokuro realizes that Akane is transcending a typical professional performance, rising to ookanban level. Akane feels the story taking on a life of its own as she detaches, visualizing herself floating high above a busy Edo-era fishing village as the story reaches its climax. The ship heads into stormy seas but a warning announcement to the passengers goes unheard by the spellbound audience. The masters are reminded of Shiguma (VI) at his best; Shiguma (V) said the story's God of Death is the rakugoka's representation of death itself, and Issho wonders what death means to Akane.
24	October 2, 2026	978-4-08-885199-0	—	—
206. "God of Death" (死神, Shinigami); 207. "Overdrive" (オーバードライブ, Ōbādoraibu); 208. "The Forerunner of All Flowers" (百花の魁, Hyakka no Sakigake); 209. "I Believe In" (信じるのは, Shinjiru no wa); 210. "I Just Wanted Her to Smile" (笑っていて欲しかった, Waratte ite Hoshikatta); 211. "Favor" (御恩, Goon); 212. "I Have Something To Say" (言いたいコトがある, Iitai Koto ga aru); 213. "God of Death - Inner" (死神―裏―, Shinigami ―Ura―); 214. "Emotional Narration" (情の語り, Jō no Katari)
Akane finishes reciting the tale, imparting the indifferent thread of fate she saw after Shiguma's brush with death. The audience sits in stunned silence, then erupt in deafening applause. Backstage, Akane confesses her surprise at the story's life "rakugo overdrive". Ikken says her performance was worthy of shin'uchi promotion. Kaisei's stage name is taken from the plum, which blooms before all others, echoing his real name, Haru Ome. (Note: Kaisei's real name is taken from the famous poem "Spring" (「春」) by Fuyue Anzai.) Kaisei's take on the classic story uses the perspective of the abandoned son, an accepted variation. (Note: Kaisei's version of "God of Death" starts after the man becomes a famed doctor with the help of the shinigami, abandoning his family after growing wealthy. The son, Kindon, is forced into servitude and contemplates ending his life after two years of hard labor, which prompts the eponymous God to appear. Kaisei's take is humorous initially, as Kindon is reluctant to talk to strangers or associates of his worthless father. After winning fame as a medical prodigy, the God of Death returns to ask why he has not sought riches. Kindon replies that his master counseled him to wait for payment until he was more mature, and expresses his appreciation for his tutelage, saying that he owes his master everything, echoing Kaisei's relationship to Issho. He manages to cure his master, but the master suspects Kindon of deliberately hesitating and dismisses him; since the shinigami stood by the pillow, Kindon has exchanged his life for his master's. The God of Death taunts the boy, who accepts his fate stoically, saying that if he was able to help one person, his sacrifice was worth it, but the shinigami scoffs at the boy's bravery and relights the candle, saying he has not even lived yet.) The audience, emotionally drained after Akane's performance, struggles to soak in the new setting, but he warms the crowd to the innocent joy of a child. Kaisei, who also struggled to cheer up his mother and improve her life, infuses the confessional rakugo with his own experience, expressing his gratitude towards Issei and still hoping to be worthy of his favor. As he finishes, he realizes that Issho was teaching him to find his own path, as a true shin'uchi must. Kaisei's twist ending evokes the audience's sympathy through his personal thoughts and emotions, proving to Issei that he is not a child seeking a father figure. Kaisei's performance receives equal adulation. The emcee, Kenbichi Arakawa, explains the winner will be determined by an audience vote, but is about to declare a tie, hinting both performances were worthy; Issho interrupts and takes the microphone to pick the winner.
25	December 4, 2026	978-4-08-885312-3	—	—

=== Chapters not yet in tankōbon format ===
These chapters have yet to be published in a tankōbon volume. They were serialized in Weekly Shōnen Jump.

215. "The Winner Is" (勝者, Shō-sha)
216. "Arakawa Symphony of Strife" (阿良川相剋会, Arakawa Sōkoku-kai)
217. "Natural Enemy" (天敵, Tenteki)
218. "Hates to Lose" (負けず嫌い, Makezugirai)
219. "Singular" (ワンパターン, Wan Patān)
220. "The King of Comedy" (喜劇王, Kigeki-ō)
221. "Back" (背中, Senaka)
222. "Brothers' Quarrel" (兄弟喧嘩, Kyōdai Kenka)
223. "Legend" (伝説, Densetsu)
224. "Time Soba" (時そば, Toki Soba)
225. "Issho's Performance" (一生の高座, Isshō no Kōza)
226. "Back in Action" (そして再興へ, Soshite Saikō e)
227. "Waiting for Akane" (朱音を待ちながら, Akane o Machinagara)
228. "Laughing Too Hard" (ウケすぎる, Uke Sugiru)
229. "The Best Young Rakugoka" (若手最強, Wakate Saikyō)
230. "It's Been a While" (久し振りだな, Hisashiburi Dana)
231. "On The Stage" (後は高座で, Ato wa Kōza de)
