= Choboichi =

Japanese dice gambling game

Choboichi (チョボイチ, also written as チョボ一, ちょぼいち, or 樗蒲一) is a simple gambling game played in Japan using one covered die. The dealer shakes a six-sided die in a cup or rice bowl and then places it upside down, concealing the rolled value; after the players wager for their prediction of what the value will be, the dealer reveals the die by lifting the cup.

== Gameplay ==
Choboichi game board
1	2	3
4	5	6

The dealer is known as the dōtori (筒取), while the bettors are the hariko (張子); the dealer is the one who holds the cup, known as the tsubo (壺) or tsubozara (壺皿). The role of the dealer may either be fixed to one person or rotate amongst the players.

Players wager by placing money on one of six spaces on the game board. Winning wagers are paid out typically at four-to-one (e.g., a player who places a $10 bet on a winning space would be paid $40) while the dealer keeps the losing bets. The winning payout may vary between 2:1 and 5:1.

Consider a player who places a total bet of ¥600, with ¥100 wagered on each space: one space will win, and the player will receive M×¥100 for that bet, but the other five spaces will lose, costing the player ¥500. The difference between the amount the player loses and the amount won is the house edge; with a multiplier of 4, that difference is ¥100, which is 1/6 (16.7%) of the initial ¥600 bet. Formally, the house edge is computed using the relative probabilities of winning and losing along with the winning multiplier, M:

$$Edge = \frac{(P_{lose} \cdot Bet) - (P_{win} \cdot M \cdot Bet)}{Bet} = \frac{5}{6} - \frac{1}{6} \cdot M$$

The house edge varies from 50% (for a multiplier of 2) to 0% (for a multiplier of 5), with the most common multiplier of 4 resulting in a house edge of 16.7%.

There are multiple variations using up to five dice, although multiple-dice games generally have different rules, including Chō-han (2 dice) and Cee-lo (3 dice).

== History ==
The game was noted to be so popular by the 18th century that an entire strip of gambling sheds one ri long, 3.75 km (2.33 mi), was dedicated to it.

=== In culture ===
At least two rakugo stories use choboichi as a central element: One for Show and "Tanuki Dice" (狸賽, Tanuki Sai).
