= Cee-lo =

Chinese-American gambling game

Dice game using three dice
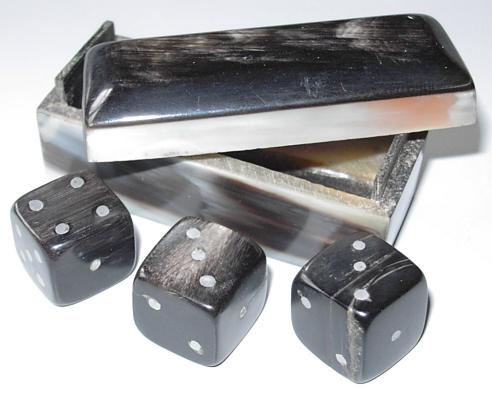
- Three dice, rolling three, three, and four, giving a point value of 4 for the game Cee-lo.
- Other names: 四五六; Sì-Wŭ-Liù; '4-5-6'; See-Low; Four-Five-Six; The Three Dice Game; Roll-off!; Dice; 三六豹子; Sān Liù Bàozi; 'Three-Six Leopards'; Chinchiro (チンチロ); Chinchirorin (チンチロリン)
- Chance: complete
- Materials required: 3×six-sided dice

Cee-lo is a gambling game played with three six-sided dice. The name is derived from the Chinese name for the game, which is literally the numerical sequence four-five-six (四五六; Sì-Wŭ-Liù; sei3 ng5 luk6). Although many variations exist, there are certain common rules, including the use of three dice and common roll combinations, such as rolling a four, five, and six to win, rolling a one, two, and three to lose, and other combinations which establish a point for comparison to rolls by other player(s).

The various sets of rules can be divided into two broad categories according to how betting is handled. In banking games, one player serves as a banker, who covers the individual bets of the other players, each of whom competes directly with the bank. In non-banking games, each player has essentially equal status, and rules must exist for the players to pool their bets and attempt to win from a common pot.

== Origins and history ==
The actual origins of the game are not clear; some of the earliest documentation comes from 1893, when Stewart Culin reported that Cee-lo was the most popular dice game played by Chinese-American laborers, although he also notes they preferred to play Fan-Tan and games using Chinese dominoes such as Pai Gow or Tien Gow rather than dice games. Gil Jacobs instead asserts the game is derived from passe-dix, with a betting system borrowed from craps.

Cee-lo flourished in Harlem during the 1970s and 80s. The game remains popular in American inner cities, but is more prominent in various New York City neighborhoods such as Harlem, Brownsville, Crown Heights, South Bronx, and Washington Heights, whereas "street craps" remains popular in other American cities such as Los Angeles, Atlanta, Chicago, and parts of the south. A deadly 2019 Brooklyn shooting was linked by police to a game of cee-lo.

Many hip hop artists have referenced the dice game "Cee-Lo" in rap songs since the 1990s. The references usually come from east coast rappers, including Kool G Rap, Big L, Jadakiss, Nas and Notorious B.I.G. as well as many other hip hop artists, and Cee-lo has seen a resurgence in popularity in American settings. A 2003 Associated Press article presented by CBS News identified Cee-lo as a fad at schools in certain areas, "played for money even by preteens".

=== Alternative names ===
In America it is also called "Roll-off!" and by several alternative spellings, as well as simply "Dice." In China it is also called "Sān Liù Bàozi" (三六豹子), or "Three-Six Leopards". In Japan, it is known as "Chinchiro" (チンチロ) or "Chinchirorin" (チンチロリン). Other regional names include:

- "Banker's Dice": Northwestern United States / Western Canada / Alaska
- "Casino": Northwestern United States / Western Canada / Alaska
- "Four-Five-Six": United States
- "Pair and a point": United States
- "See-Low": United States
- "Shingoro": Japan
- "Strung Flowers": China
- "Sz' 'ng luk", abbreviated to "Sing luk": China
- "Three dice game": United States

== Rules ==
There is not one standard set of rules, but there are some constants that hold true to all sets of rules.

The constants include the number of dice used, which is always three. All rules describe certain winning combinations that can be rolled, and a four, five, and six is always treated as a winning combination for the first player who rolls it (though in some variants without a banker, it may be possible for several players to make a "winning combination," requiring a second shootout). Besides the winning combinations, all Cee-lo rules include certain rolls that establish a "point," and there are situations where two or more players will roll and compare their points to determine a winner. If for any reason the dice were to leave the playing area (ex: rolling off of the table and hitting the floor) the player would be deemed an automatic loss.

Cee-lo can either be played with one central player (the bank) making individual bets with each other player, or as a winner-take-all game. The rules for play both with and without a bank are described below, including some common variants of each.

Casual players can still play the game "with a bank", as it includes rules that dictate when the duty of "being the bank" should pass to a new player.

=== Roll combinations ===
Potential Cee-lo rolls
Name	Example			Outcome	True probability	Comment
Triple	6	6	6	WIN	6/216 (2.78%)	All three dice show the same number. Triple six, six, and six is the highest roll, triple five, five, and five is the next highest, etc. Any triple is considered an instant win. Triples are nicknamed "trips" or, in Chinese, 豹子; bàozǐ; 'leopards'.
4-5-6	4	5	6	WIN	6/216 (2.78%)	Sequential four, five, and six; this is considered an instant win. In Chinese this sequence is called 四五六通杀; sì-wǔ-liù tōng shā; '4-5-6 straight kill' or 串花; chuàn huā; cyun3 faa1; 'strung flowers'. Some call this "four-five and a lovely".
Pair + Value	2	2	6	WIN	15/216 (6.94%)	Any pair together with a single six is an instant win. Also called "two alike six high".
Pair + Value	3	3	5	5 points	60/216 (27.78%)	One pair plus any other value; the odd die is the point value. This is sometimes called "spare and a pair" or "pair and a point". For example, either a two, two, and five or a one, one, and five would give a point value of 5, and either would outscore a roll of three, three, and four (point value of 4), which would in turn outscore a roll of five, five, and two (point value of 2). Possible point values range from 2 to 5, since point values of 6 and 1 are special cases.
Pair + Value	4	4	3	3 points	60/216 (27.78%)	One pair plus any other value; the odd die is the point value. This is sometimes called "spare and a pair" or "pair and a point". For example, either a two, two, and five or a one, one, and five would give a point value of 5, and either would outscore a roll of three, three, and four (point value of 4), which would in turn outscore a roll of five, five, and two (point value of 2). Possible point values range from 2 to 5, since point values of 6 and 1 are special cases.
Pair + Value	5	5	1	LOSE	15/216 (6.94%)	Any pair together with a single one is an instant loss. Also called "ace negative" or "craps out". In Chinese this is 幺屁眼; yāo pìyǎn; 'asshole ones'.
1-2-3	1	2	3	LOSE	6/216 (2.78%)	Sequential one, two, and three; this is considered an instant loss. In Chinese this sequence is called 一二三通赔; yī'-èr-sān tōng péi; jat1 ji6 saam1 tung1 pui4; '1-2-3 straight lose' or 舞龍; wǔ lóng; mou5 lung4; 'dancing dragon'.
Indeterminate	3	5	6	Re-roll	108/216 (50%)	Any combination that does not result in a triple, sequential (a four, five, and six win or a one, two, and three loss), or points (pair + value) is considered an indeterminate outcome and requires a re-roll.

Of the 108 potential valid combinations, 27 are instant wins, 21 are instant losses, and 60 establish a point between 2 and 5. The winning rolls (the four, five, and six, the trips, and the point 6) are collectively called "headcracks".

=== Cee-lo with a bank ===
By definition, Cee-lo is a banking game, meaning that the players bet against an established banker, and it is a "point game", meaning that some dice rolls establish a point for the player (similar to the popular dice game craps). The basic flow of the banking variant is:

1. The initial stake for the bank is set and faded by placing bets before any dice are rolled.
2. Banker throws the dice until a valid combination is rolled:
  1. If the banker rolls triples, or a combination of four, five, and six, or establishes a point of 6, the bank wins and takes all bets.
  2. If the banker rolls a combination of one, two, and three, or establishes a point of 1, the bank loses and pays out all bets.
  3. Any valid combination not included above means the bank has established a point between 2 and 5.
3. When the bank has established a point between 2 and 5, each player takes a turn throwing the dice until a valid combination is rolled.
  1. If the player rolls triples, a combination of four, five, and six, establishes a point of 6, or establishes a point higher than the bank's point, the player wins and gets their bet back, plus an equal amount from the bank.
  2. If the player rolls a combination of one, two, and three, establishes a point of 1, or establishes a point lower than the bank's point, the player loses and their bet is taken by the bank.
  3. If the player establishes a point equal to the bank's point, it is a tie and the player's bet is returned without taking any money from the bank.

In this game, one person is established as the banker, and all other players make even money bets against the bank. If a player makes a $10 bet, then they stand to either win or lose $10 depending on the roll of the dice. The Banker has an advantage relative to the other players (amounting to approximately 2.7% of the amount bet) because the banker rolls first; this is driven by the number of potential instant wins (27) versus the number of potential instant losses (21).

==== Betting ====
According to the rules of "Strung Flowers", each player throws the dice to determine which player will be the banker. The player who rolls the highest total number of red pips (sum of one and four faces on Chinese dice) is the banker.

When one player is established as the banker, they put up an initial stake known as the bank, or center bet. Once they have placed their stake, and announced the amount, the other players have a chance to cover or "fade" the bank. Starting with the player to the banker's left, and proceeding clockwise around the circle, each player in turn can fade a portion of the bank, as much as they like, until the entire bank is covered. Alternatively, after every player has had a chance to make a bet, if the entire bank has not been covered, the banker withdraws the uncovered amount.

For example, if the initial stake is $100, the first player might choose to fade $20, the next player $20, and the next player $60. Then the entire bank is covered and no more bets are placed this round. As an uncovered example, if the initial stake is $100, six players choose to fade $10 each, and no one else wishes to bet, then the banker pockets the unfaded portion of the bank ($40), reducing the initial stake to $60, and plays for only the stakes that were covered.

After all the bets are settled according to the roll of the dice (explained below), if the same player maintains control of the bank, the banker may add as much money as they wish to their stake, or let the bank stand at whatever amount remains after all the bets are settled. After a new round begins, the players fade again just as above, and so the game continues.

Control of the bank can change under certain circumstances. If the banker establishes a point and all the players beat the banker by points in one round, they break the bank. Alternatively, if the banker rolls one of the instant loss combinations (a combination of one, two, and three, or establishing a point of 1), the bank is also broken. In both cases, control of the bank then passes to the next player to the banker's left, who establishes his own initial stake as above. Otherwise, the first player to beat the banker by rolling a combination of four, five, and six, or triples will become the new banker after the existing banker settles the remaining bets and pockets whatever remains of the bank.

==== The banker rolls the dice ====
When all the bets have been established, the banker rolls the dice. There are four outcomes: automatic win, automatic loss, set point, or re-roll. If the banker sets a point, the bets are settled individually by having each player roll the dice after the banker.

- Automatic Win: If the banker rolls a combination of four, five, ane six, "triples" (all three dice show the same number), or a pair (of non-sixes) with a six then they instantly win all bets.
- Automatic Loss: If the banker rolls a combination of one, two, and three, or a pair (of non-ones) with a one, they instantly lose all bets (the players break the bank).
- Set Point: If the banker rolls a pair and a single (two, three, four, or five), then the single becomes the banker's "point." E.g. a roll of two, two, and four gives the banker a point of 4. Note that one cannot set a point of 1 or 6, as those would result in an automatic loss or win, respectively (see above).
- Re-roll: If the dice do not show any of the above combinations, then the banker rolls again and keeps rolling until they get an instant win or an instant loss, or sets a point.

==== The players roll the dice ====
If the banker does not roll an automatic win or loss, they will have rolled a point of 2, 3, 4, or 5. Each player then rolls the dice to settle their individual bet against the banker. The player wins with a combination of four, five, and six, a triple, or any point higher than the Banker's. They lose with a combination of one, two, and three, or any point lower than the banker's. If they tie the banker's point, then it is a "push", no winner or loser, and the player pockets his stake. If they do not roll win, loss, or point, they continue to roll the dice until they do so.

The first player to win with a four, five and six, or triple commonly gets the privilege of being the next banker after all the bets of this round are settled. It is also often the case that the combination of four, five, and six pays double, the triples pay three times, and triple one, one, and one pay five times the wager, though different betting systems may be agreed upon.

==== Variations in rules for the banking game ====
Some variants of Cee-lo have been described that reverse the rules of winning and losing rolls for the player who is not a banker, making a one, two, and three a win for the player, and four, five, and six a loss. If such a rule is followed to the extent that triples become a losing roll for the player, then this slightly increases the advantage to the banker.

In another variant, the triple one, one, one is considered a losing roll ("acey out"), which has the overall effect of reducing the banker's edge. In others, the pair six and six, and the pair one and one, may be used to establish points of 6 and 1, respectively, instead of counting as automatic wins or losses.

The difference in points may be used to adjust the bonus payoff; for example, if the player establishes a point which beats the bank's point by 1, that would result in the player receiving their bet back plus a bonus equal to 1/3 of the original bet; beating the bank by 2 points would award a bonus of 2/3 of the original bet; and beating the bank by 3 points would award a bonus equal to the original bet.

=== Cee-lo without a bank (winner take all) ===
In this version of the game, each round involves two or more players of equal status. A bet amount is agreed upon and each player puts that amount in the pile or pot. Each player then has to roll all three dice at once and must continue until a recognized combination is rolled. Whichever player rolls the best combination wins the entire pot, and a new round begins. In cases where two or more players tie for the best combination, they must have a shoot out to determine a single winner.

The combinations are similar to those described above, and can be ranked from best to worst as:

4–5–6
The highest possible roll. If you roll a four, five, and six, you automatically win.
Trips
Rolling three same numbers is known as rolling a trip. Higher trips beat lower trips, so a four, four, and four is better than a three, three, and three. Any trips beats any established point.
Point
Rolling a pair, and another number, establishes the singleton as a "point". A higher point beats a lower point, so a two, two, and six (establishing a point of 6) is better than a five, five, and two (establishing a point of 2).
1–2–3
The lowest possible meaningful roll. If you roll a one, two, and three, you automatically lose.

Note that 6 and 1 are valid points that can be established, and do not result in an automatic win or loss, respectively, as in the banking game. Any other roll is a meaningless combination and must be rerolled until one of the above combinations occurs.

==== Variations in rules for the non-banking game ====
Some non-banking games also treat one, one, and one as a losing roll, and may refer to this as an "ace out".

Some players rule that a four, five, and six is an instant win for the first player who rolls it, and it cannot be tied. To see who picks the order, each person rolls a die and the person with the highest number chooses the order. If it is a tie, then those people roll again and again until one person has a higher number. Other rules allow for a four, five, and six to be tied, which may be referred to as "catch up" rules but this is usually not the case.

One variant rules that if a player wins with "trips" or four, five, and six, all players must pay double the original bet. This is known as "doubling down".

In a two player game, dealer/player who rolls a "1" on the odd die is considered to have been "aced out", losing automatically. If the odd die is a "6", "trips", or "head crack", the player wins automatically.

=== Variants applicable to both banking and non-banking games ===
Some players designate a limited surface where players can roll, instead of throwing the dice off a wall, such as a table or a cardboard box. If the dice roll off the surface, it is called a "loose roll" or "sloppy dice," resulting in an automatic loss for the player.

Some rule that if a player rolls the dice 3 times without getting a meaningful combination, they are out. Others may raise the limit to 5 times without a meaningful combination.

One variation assigns a point based on the pair rolled, rather than the singleton; i.e., a five, five, and two establishes a point of five (also known by various slang terms such as "fevers"), which beats a three, three, and six which establishes a point of three (a.k.a. "treys").

A variation described as a "West Coast Version" ranks the combinations somewhat differently. It ranks pairs according to the highest pair, ignoring the singleton (as described immediately above), then treats all "trips" as an instant loss. One, two, and three is treated as just another meaningless roll.

Another variant treats triples as "high points" and doubles as "low points" (which are set in the traditional way). In this variant a "low six" (e.g. a two, two, and six) beats a "high five" (a five, five, and five), but a "high five" (a five, five, and five) beats a "low five" (e.g. a three, three, and five), and so on with other points.

A variant of Cee-lo has been sold under the name Chinchirorin. According to the rules of this game, Chinchirorin is a traditional Japanese game. Mainly played by older people in Japan, the game is reportedly gaining in popularity as a gambling game in that country.

== Probabilities ==
With three six-sided dice there are (6×6×6=) 216 possible permutations.

- Four, five, and six: 6/216 = 2.78% (Automatic Win)
- Trips: 6/216 = 2.78%
- Point: 90/216 = 41.67%
- One, two, and three: 6/216 = 2.78% (Automatic Loss)
- Meaningless permutations: 108/216 = 50%

== See also ==
- Sic bo, an ancient Chinese game of chance played with three dice
