= Bầu cua cá cọp =

Vietnamese dice gambling game

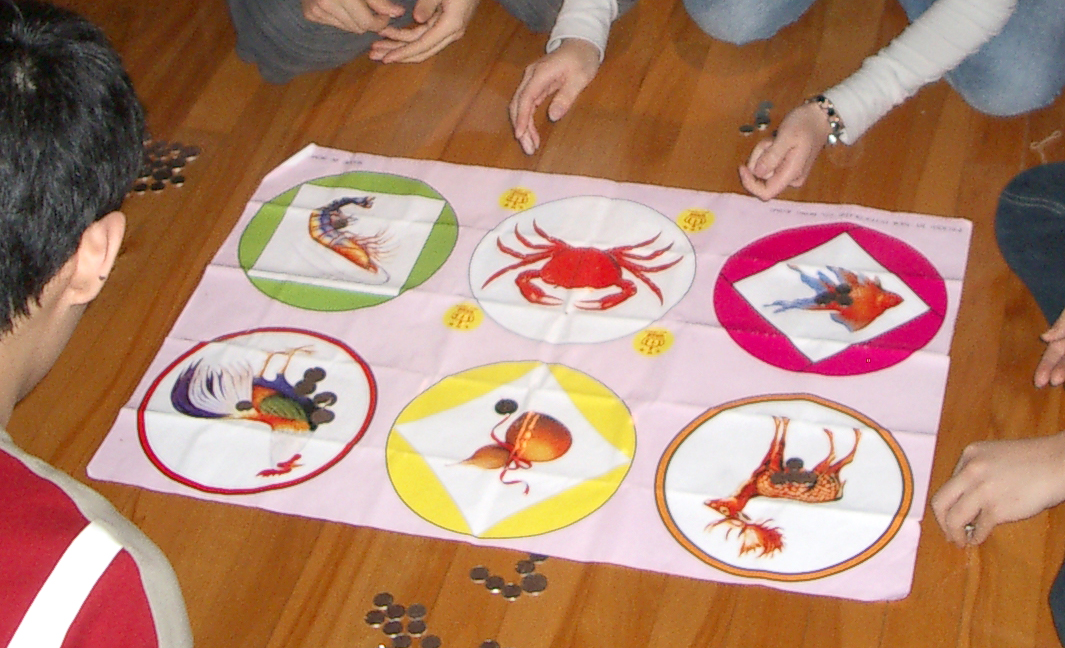
A playing mat for Bầu cua cá cọp

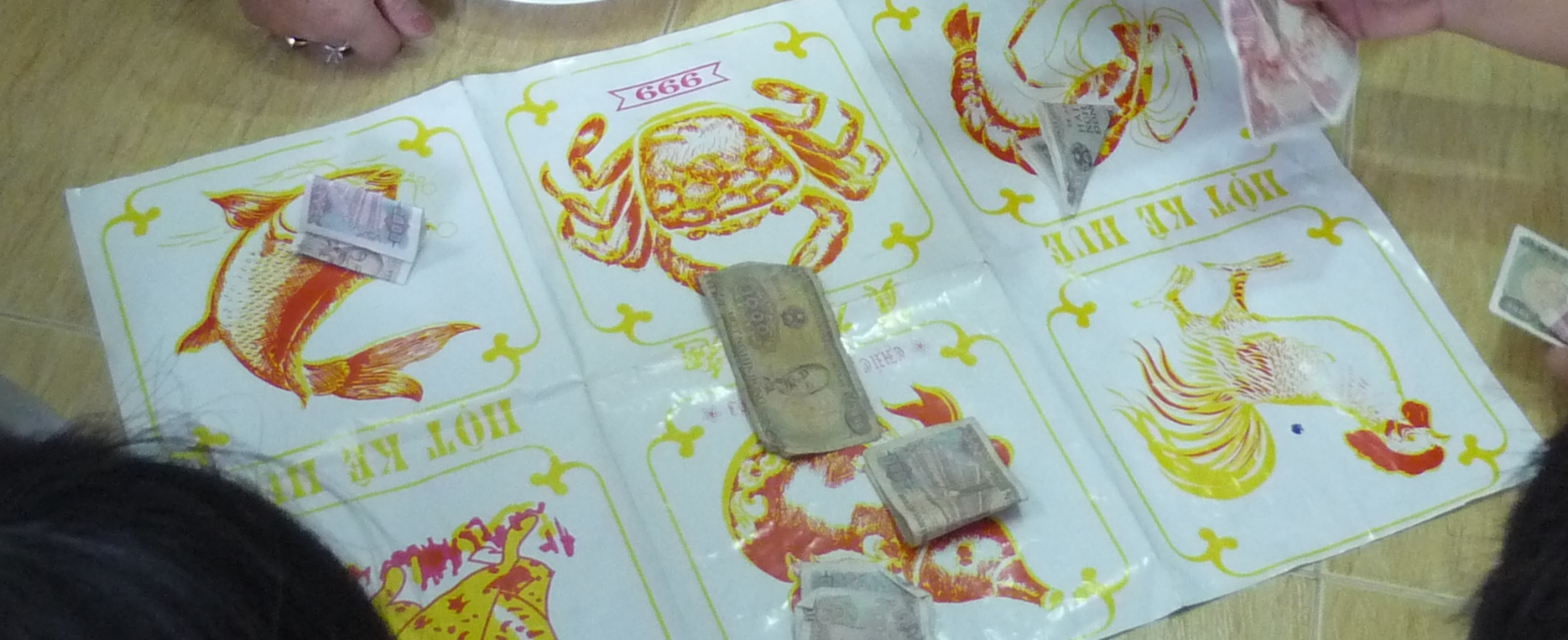
Gambling board with Vietnamese đồng notes used for gambling.

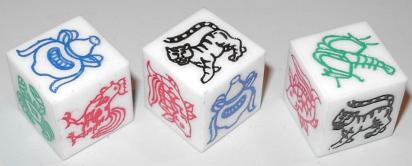
Dice used in Bầu cua cá cọp.

Bầu cua cá cọp (lit. 'gourd crab fish tiger'; also Bầu cua tôm cá or Lắc bầu cua) is a Vietnamese gambling game using three dice. The game is often played at Vietnamese New Year.

Instead of showing one to six pips, the sides of the dice have pictures of a fish; a prawn; a crab; a cock; a calabash; and a stag (or a tiger). Players place wagers on a board that has the six pictures, betting on which pictures will appear. If one die corresponds with a bet, the bettor receives the same amount as their bet. If two dice correspond with a bet, the bettor receives two times their money. If three dice correspond with a bet, the bettor receives three times their money. If one were to place 3 đồng on fish, and the dealer rolls 1 fish, 1 crab and 1 stag, then the bettor would receive 3 đồng while keeping the 3 đồng they had bet. Any money not rewarded for the round is kept in a central pool managed by the dealer, who rolls the dice.

Bầu cua cá cọp is essentially the Vietnamese original version of Hoo Hey How (Fish-Prawn-Crab) played in China, and Klah Klok/Kla Klouk which is the Cambodian version, and the dice game Crown and Anchor adopted by British sailors, or chuck-a-luck played in America.
