= Chuck-a-luck =

Game of chance played with dice

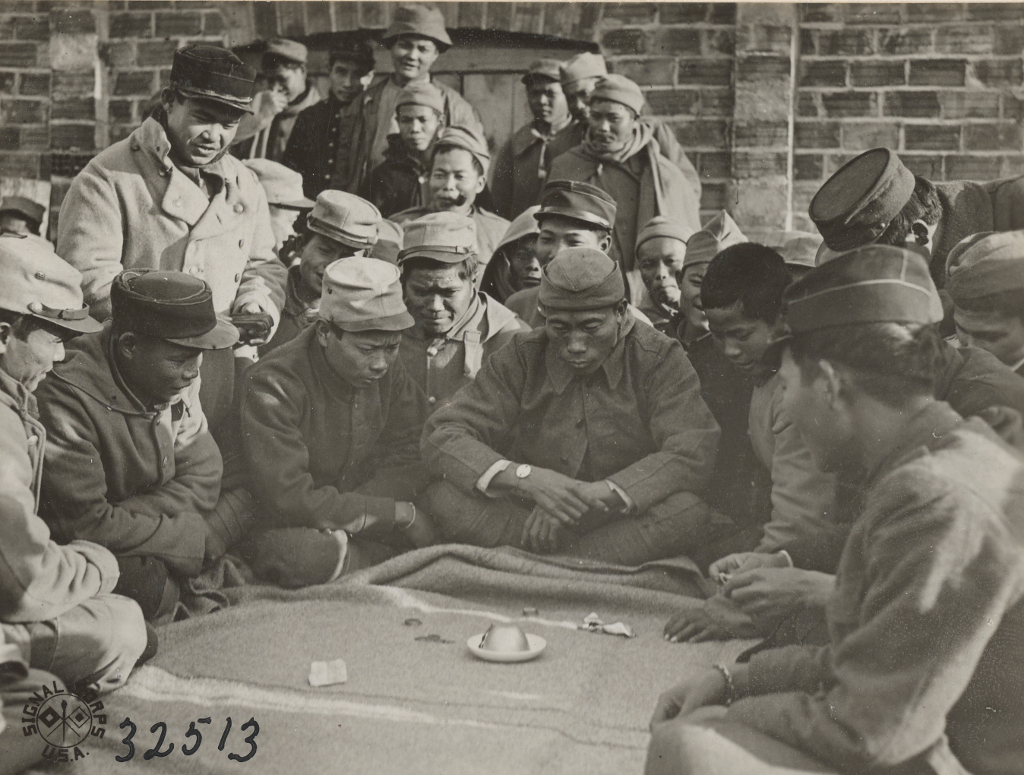
Workers play Chuck-a-luck during World War One in France on an improvised board.

Chuck-a-luck, also known as birdcage, or sweat rag, is a game of chance played with three dice. It is derived from grand hazard and both can be considered a variant of sic bo, which is a popular casino game, although chuck-a-luck is more of a carnival game than a true casino game. The game is sometimes used as a fundraiser for charity.

== Rules ==
Chuck-a-luck is played with three standard six-sided, numbered dice that are kept in a device shaped somewhat like an hourglass which resembles a wire-frame bird cage and pivots about its centre. The dealer rotates the cage end over end, with the dice landing on the bottom.

Wagers are placed based on possible combinations that can appear on the three dice. The possible wagers are usually fewer than the wagers that are possible in sic bo and, in that sense, chuck-a-luck can be considered to be a simpler game. In the simplest variant, bettors place stakes on a board with six numbered spaces, labelled 1 through 6, inclusive. They receive a 1:1 payout if the number bet on appears once, a 2:1 payout if the number appears twice, and a 3:1 payout if the number is rolled all 3 times. In this respect, the basic game is identical to Crown and Anchor, but with numbered dice instead of symbols.

Additional wagers that are commonly seen, and their associated odds, are set out in the table below.

Type	Wager	Typical payout	Actual odds (Note: Probability of the outcome occurring)	House edge (Note: Difference between payout and actual odds)
Single Die Bet	A specific number will appear	1 die matches: 1 to 1	75/216 (34.72%)	4.63% (10:1) (Note: Assuming a 10 to 1 payout on triple) 7.87% (3:1) (Note: Assuming a 3 to 1 payout on triple)
Single Die Bet	A specific number will appear	2 dice match: 2 to 1	15/216 (6.94%)	4.63% (10:1) 7.87% (3:1)
Single Die Bet	A specific number will appear	3 dice match: 10 to 1 (Note: Sometimes this is adjusted to 3 to 1)	1/216 (0.46%)	4.63% (10:1) 7.87% (3:1)
Any Triple (Note: This wager is not always offered)	Any of the triples (all three dice show the same number) will appear	30 to 1	6/216 (2.78%)	13.89%
Big (Note: House advantage derives from the possibility of a triple. Refer to the related games of Sic bo and Grand Hazard.)	The total score will be 11 (sometimes 12) or higher with the exception of a triple	1 to 1	105/216 (48.61%)	2.78% (≥11)
Small	The total score will be 10 (sometimes 9) or lower with the exception of a triple	1 to 1	105/216 (48.61%)	2.78% (≤10)
Field	The total score will be outside the range of 8 to 12 (inclusive)	1 to 1	91/216 (42.13%)	15.74% (<8 & >12)

=== House advantage or edge ===
Chuck-a-luck is a game of chance. On average, the players are expected to lose more than they win. The casino's advantage (house advantage or house edge) is greater than most other casino games and can be much greater for certain wagers. According to John Scarne, "habitual gamblers stay away from Chuck-a-Luck because they know how little chance they have against such a high [house edge]. They call Chuck-a-Luck 'the champ chump's game.'"

For the single die bet, there are 216 (6 × 6 × 6) possible outcomes for a throw of three dice. For a specific number:

- there are 75 possible outcomes where only one die will match the number;
- there are 15 possible outcomes where two dice will match; and
- there is one possible outcome where all three dice will match; and so
- there are 125 possible outcomes where no die will match the number.

At payouts of 1 to 1, 2 to 1 and 10 to 1 respectively for each of these types of outcome, the expected loss as a percentage of the stake wagered is:

1 - ((75/216) × 2 + (15/216) × 3 + (1/216) × 11) = 4.6%

At more disadvantageous payouts of 1 to 1, 2 to 1 and 3 to 1, the expected loss as a percentage of the stake wagered is:

1 - ((75/216) × 2 + (15/216) × 3 + (1/216) × 4) = 7.9%

If the payouts are adjusted to 1 to 1, 3 to 1 and 5 to 1 respectively, the expected loss as a percentage is:

1 - ((75/216) × 2 + (15/216) × 4 + (1/216) × 6) = 0%

Commercially organised gambling games almost always have a house advantage which acts as a fee for the privilege of being allowed to play the game, so the last scenario would represent a payout system used for a home game, where players take turns being the role of banker/casino.

== Variants ==
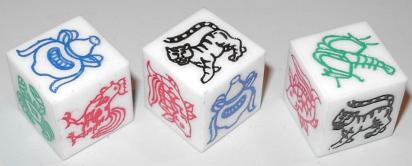
Bau cua ca cop dice

- As noted previously, the single-die wager of chuck-a-luck is essentially identical to Crown and Anchor, the traditional Vietnamese game Bau cua ca cop, and the Chinese dice game Hoo Hey How, each of which use six-sided dice with symbols instead of pips.
- A version of the Big Six wheel is loosely based on chuck-a-luck, with selected combinations of three dice appearing in 54 slots on a spinning wheel. Because of the distribution of the combinations, the house advantage or edge for this wheel is greater than for chuck-a-luck.

== In popular culture ==
There is a reference to chuck-a-luck in the Abbott and Costello film Hold That Ghost.

In Fritz Lang's 1952 film, Rancho Notorious, chuck-a-luck is the name of the ranch run by Altar Keane (played by Marlene Dietrich) where outlaws hide from the law. Chuck-a-luck is featured in the lyrics to the theme song and in some plot points.

The game is played by Lazar in the James Bond movie The Man with the Golden Gun.

The game is played by Freddie Rumsen in Mad Men season 2 episode 9, "Six-Month Leave".

In Dragonfly in Amber the character Claire Randall describes the activity inside of an inn as having several soldiers playing chuck-a-luck on the floor along with a dog sleeping by the fire and smelling strongly of hops.

== See also ==
- Crown and anchor
