= Crown and anchor =

Dice game

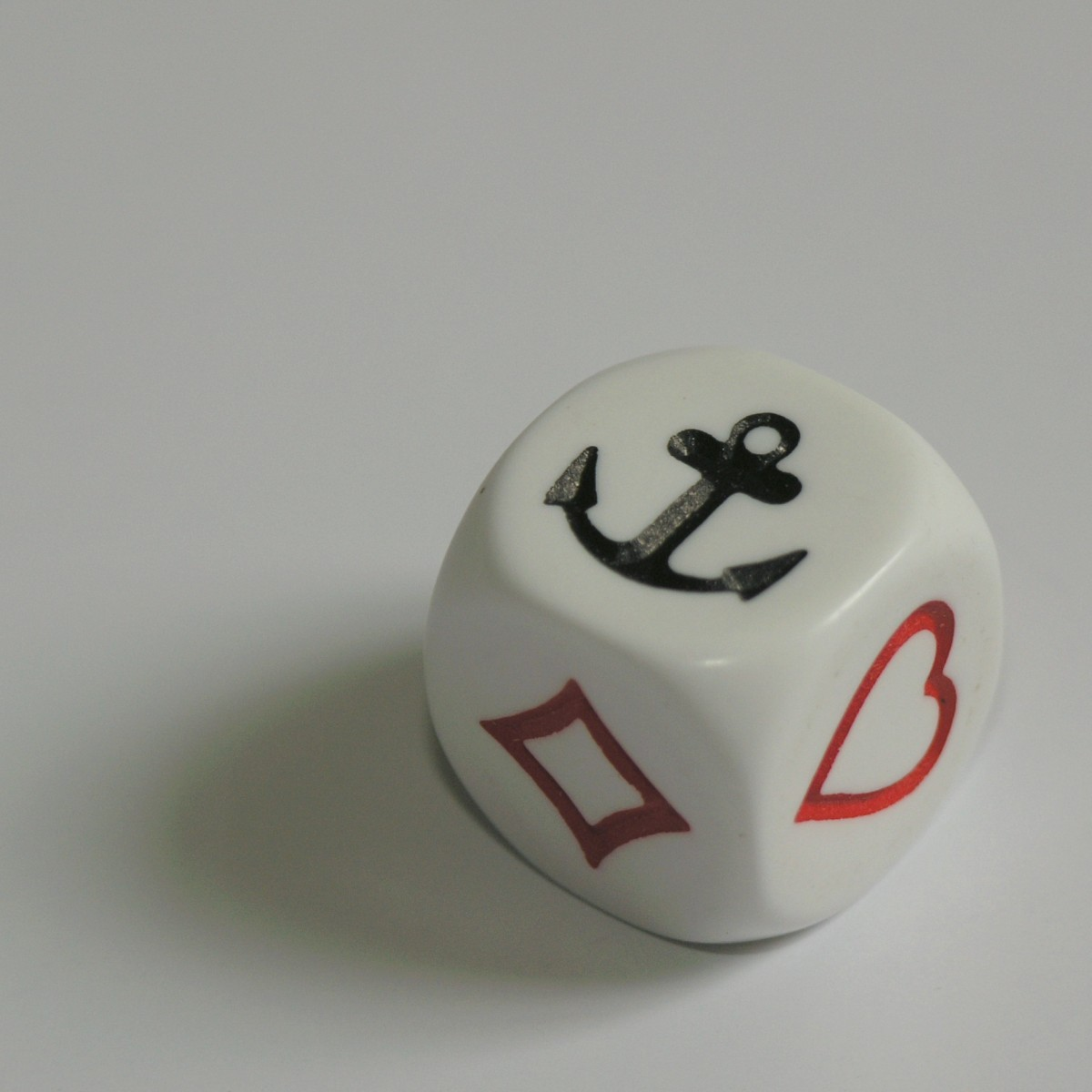
A Crown and anchor die

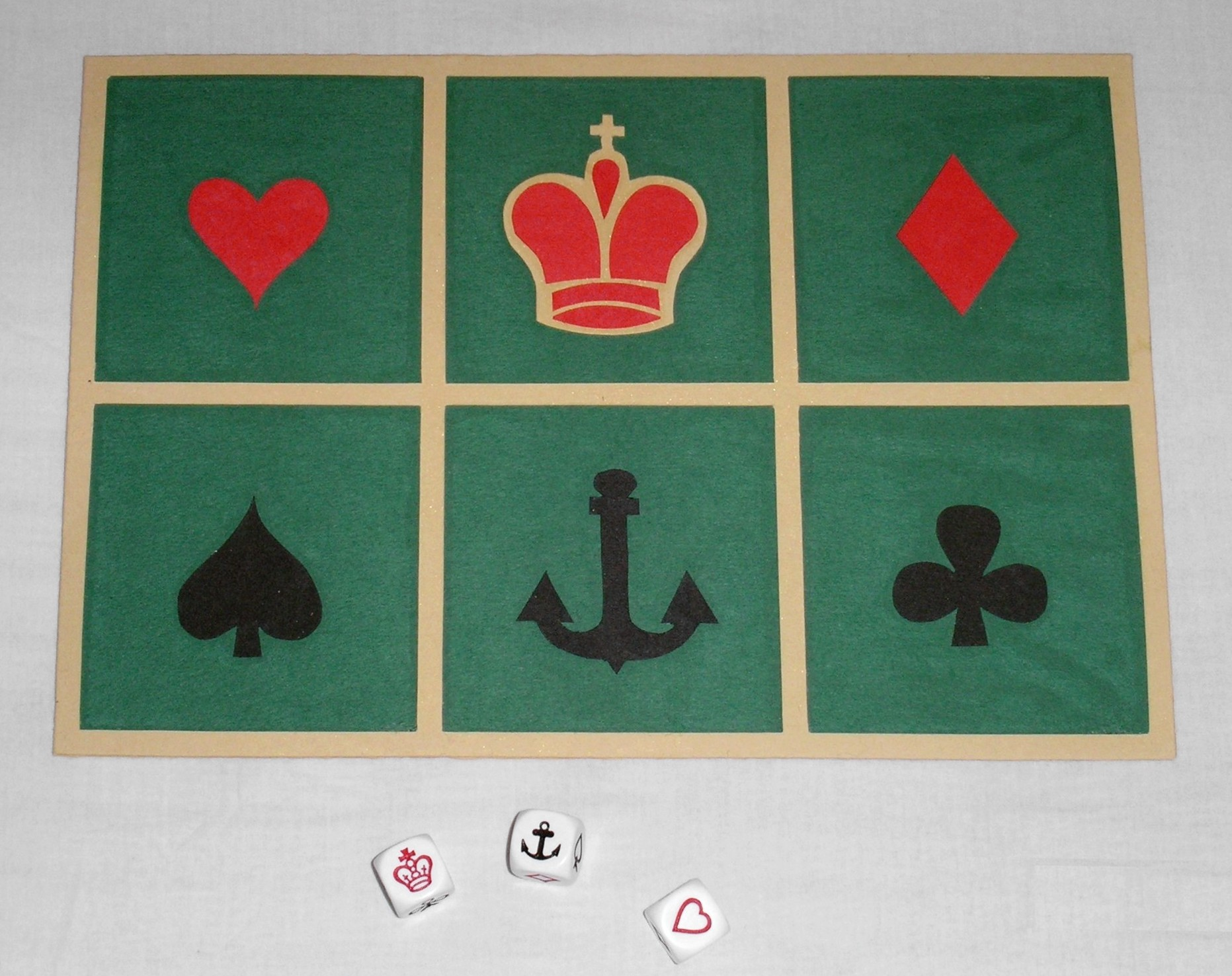
Crown and anchor playing mat and dice

Crown and anchor is a simple dice game, traditionally played for gambling purposes by sailors in the Royal Navy as well as those in the British merchant and fishing fleets.

It is typically played as a game between two parties, either between two people or a house or casino and a player. Three special dice are used in crown and anchor. The dice are equal in size and shape to standard dice, but instead of one through six pips, they are marked with six symbols: crown, anchor, diamond, spade, club and heart, the last four matching the French suits, common playing card suits in the English-speaking world.

== History ==
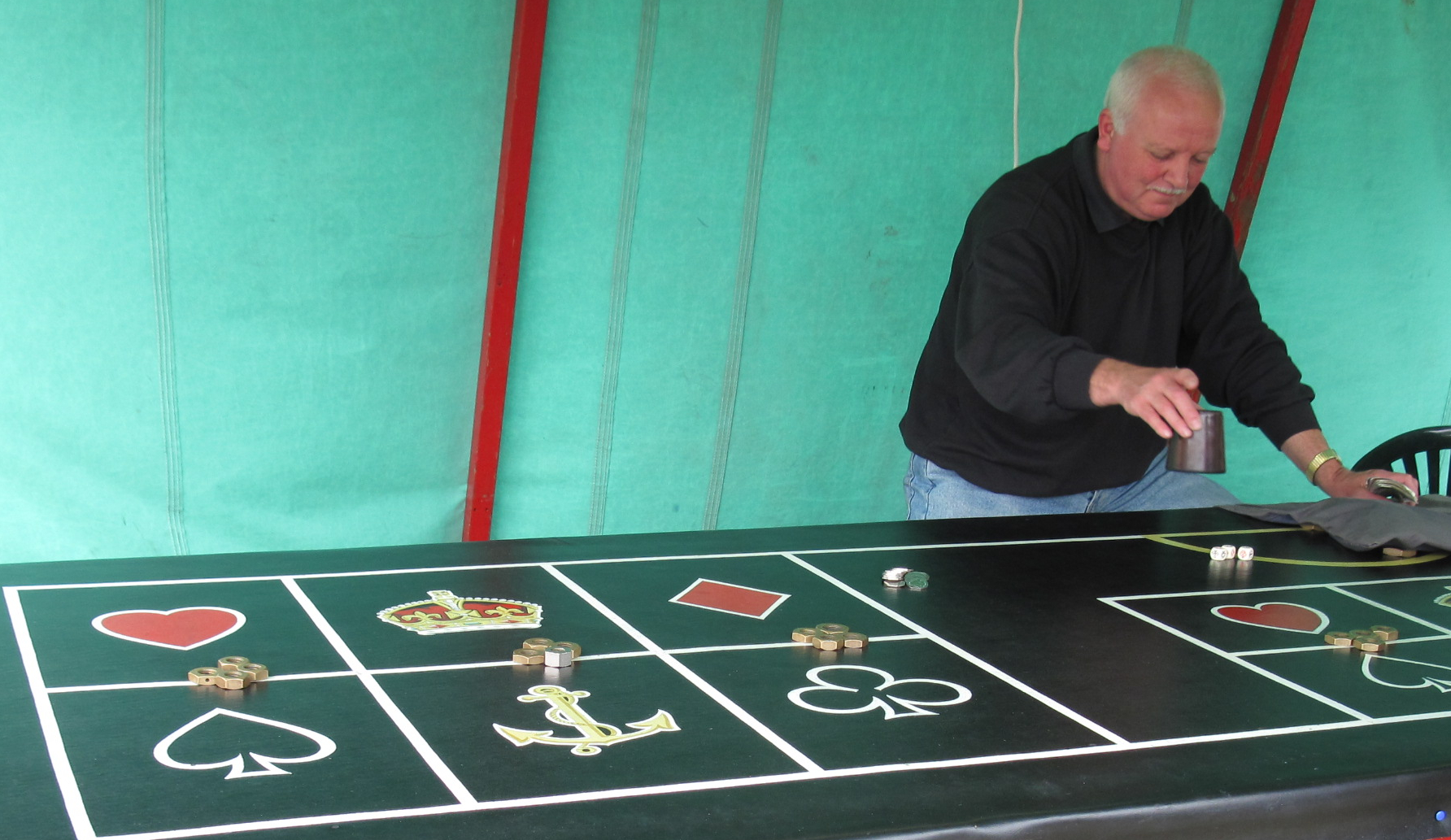
Crown and anchor stall at Battle of Flowers funfair in Jersey

The game originated in the 18th century.

It is still popular in the Channel Islands and Bermuda, but is strictly controlled and may be played legally only on certain occasions, such as the Channel Islands' agricultural shows or annual Liberation Day celebrations or Bermuda's annual Cup Match cricket game.

== Rules of play ==
The game is played between a player and a banker. A canvas or felt mat marked with the six symbols is used for play.

The player places bets on one or more symbols and then throws the three dice. If there is a bet on any symbol which comes up on one or more of the dice, the banker returns the player's stake on that symbol, and additionally pays out the value of that stake for each die showing that symbol: even money if one, 2:1 if two, and 3:1 if three. If the symbol does not come up, the player's bet is lost.

The 'expected return' (ie average profit/loss) of a £1 wager on a particular symbol is calculated as follows: (Note: C(3,1), C(3,2) are the respective binomial coefficients for just one die showing the symbol, or any combination of two. They are sometimes written as _{3}C_{1}, _{3}C_{2}.)

- The chance of the symbol coming up on none of the dice is (5/6)^{3} which is 125/216. The player loses £1 in this case.
- The chance of the symbol coming up on one of three dice is C(3,1) × 1/6 × 5/6 × 5/6, which is 75/216. The player wins back the £1 plus £1 more.
- The chance of the symbol coming up on two of three dice is C(3,2) x 1/6 × 1/6 × 5/6, which is 15/216. The player wins back the £1 plus £2 more.
- The chance of the symbol coming up on all three dice is (1/6)^{3}, which is 1/216. The player wins back the £1 plus £3 more.

In total, the expected return of a £1 wager is

((£3 × 1) + (£2 × 15) + (£1 × 75) + (–£1 × 125))/216, or
(£3 + £30 + £75 – £125)/216, or
(–£17)/216 ≈ –£0.0787

Put another way, for every pound wagered, a player will receive back about 92 pence.

Thus, the banker has an edge. In a game at a festival or casino, the house will be banker. In a game among friends, each person serves as banker in turn.

== Variations ==
A similar version of the game is played in Nepal, called "Langur Burja" (Nepali: लङ्गुर बुर्जा). There is a similar Flemish version called Anker en Zon ("Anchor and Sun"), in which a sun symbol replaces the crown. The French version again uses the sun, and is called Ancre, Pique, et Soleil ("Anchor, Spade, and Sun"). A similar game played in China called Hoo Hey How (魚蝦蟹, Fish-Prawn-Crab in Hokkien) and Vietnam called or Bầu cua cá cọp (lit. 'gourd-crab-shrimp-fish').

== Cultural references ==
- Crown and anchor is one of the dice games played in the detective series Foyle's War, episode 15, "Casualties of War."
- The game is mentioned in Terry Pratchett's 2012 book Dodger.
- The game is mentioned in Thomas Pynchon's 1972 book Gravity's Rainbow.
- The game plays a significant part in Ronald Hugh Morrieson's 1964 novel Came a Hot Friday, which suggests that the game was popular (although possibly not legal) in New Zealand at the time.
- In Dorothy L. Sayers' 1937 mystery novel Busman's Honeymoon, two "lads" play the game on the steps of the Wesleyan Chapel.
- In the 1949 film Passport to Pimlico, the game is played at a stall in a street market.
- The game is mentioned in season 1, episode 2 of the Netflix series Thieves of the Wood.
- The game is mentioned numerous times throughout Spike Milligan's war memoirs when his battery gets to North Africa. It is played in the down time between action.
- Crown and anchor appears at least twice in David Jones's prose-poem In Parenthesis. In Part 4, Dai Greatcoat states: “I served Longinus that Dux bat blind and bent; / the Dandy Xth are my regiment; / who diced / Crown and Mud-hook / under the Tree.” In Part 5, Jones depicts the privates playing the game just outside battalion headquarters: “outside, across the yard, the dozen H.Q. details bunched to cast lots with: / Old Johnny Fairplay all the way from Bombay / to have a little bit on the lucky Mud-hook.”
- In The Wheel of Time book series by Robert Jordan, a popular dice game among gamblers is crowns which uses similar rules to Crown & Anchor.

== See also ==
- Chuck-a-luck
- Poker dice
- Uckers
