= Hoo Hey How =

Chinese dice game

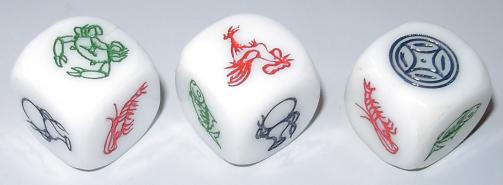
- Hoo Hey How dice

Chinese name
- Traditional Chinese: 魚蝦蟹
- Simplified Chinese: 鱼虾蟹
- Literal meaning: fish-shrimp-crab
Transcriptions
Standard Mandarin
- Hanyu Pinyin: yúxiāxiè
Southern Min
- Hokkien POJ: hû-hê-hōe

Alternative Chinese name
- Traditional Chinese: 魚蝦鱟
- Simplified Chinese: 鱼虾鲎
- Literal meaning: fish-shrimp-horseshoe crab
Transcriptions
Standard Mandarin
- Hanyu Pinyin: yúxiāhòu
Southern Min
- Hokkien POJ: hû-hê-hāu

Vietnamese name
- Vietnamese: Bầu cua cá cọp

Khmer name
- Khmer: ខ្លាឃ្លោក

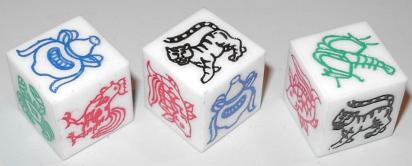
Bầu cua cá cọp dice

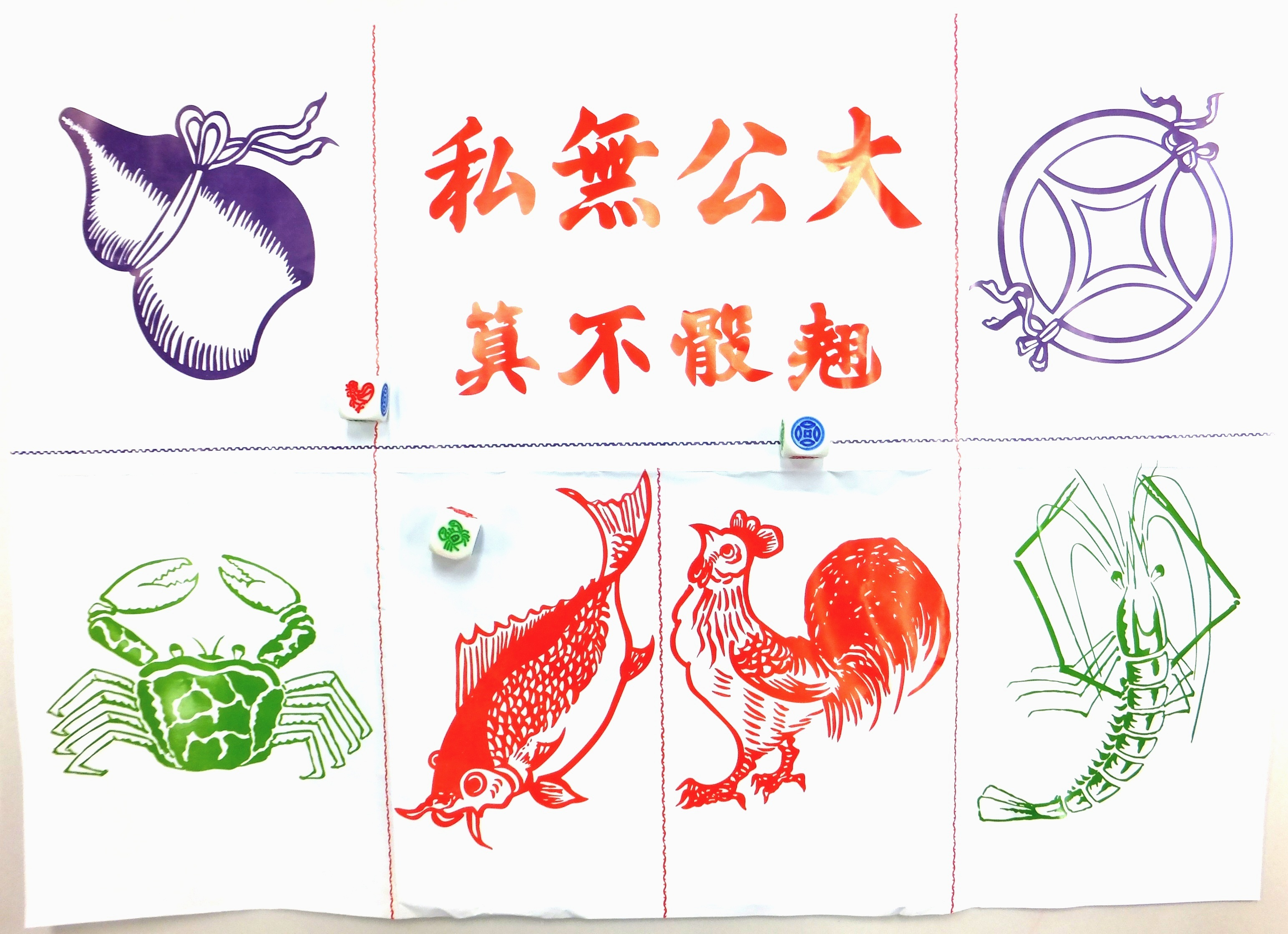
A playing mat with coloured dice

Hoo Hey How (Chinese: 魚蝦蟹; pinyin: yú xiā xiè; lit. 'Fish-Prawn-Crab') is a Chinese dice game played with three identical six-sided dice. It is related to Bầu cua cá cọp in Vietnam, Klah Klok (Khmer: ខ្លាឃ្លោក, romanized: khlaa khlook, lit. 'leopard') in Cambodia, and similar to Crown and Anchor in the West Indies and the American game chuck-a-luck.

Die face variants
Face	Hoo Hey How (Yu Xia Xie)	Alternate	Bầu cua cá cọp	Klah Klok
1	Fish	Fish	Fish	
2	Calabash			Stag
3	Prawn	Cock	Tiger	Prawn
4	Crab	Prawn	Crab	
5	Coin		Prawn	Calabash
6	Cock	Crab	Cock	Cock

== Rules of play ==
The game is played between a player and a banker. A canvas or felt mat marked with the six symbols is used for play.

The player places bets on one or more symbols and then throws the three dice. If there is a bet on any symbol which comes up on one or more of the dice, the banker returns the player's stake on that symbol and additionally pays out the value of that stake for each die showing that symbol: even money if one, 2:1 if two, and 3:1 if three. If the symbol does not come up, the player's bet is lost.

Per the calculations for Crown and Anchor, the probability of a player losing their bet due to no dice showing their chosen symbol is 57.9%. The likelihood of them winning their bet is 34.7%, 6.9%, and 0.5% for the probability of their symbol showing up on one, two, and three dice respectively. For every 100 yuan wagered, a player is expected to lose 7.87 yuan to the banker. When Hoo Hey How is played at a casino, the house acts as banker, while when played with friends, the role of banker rotates between the players.
