= Sic bo =

Chinese casino game of chance

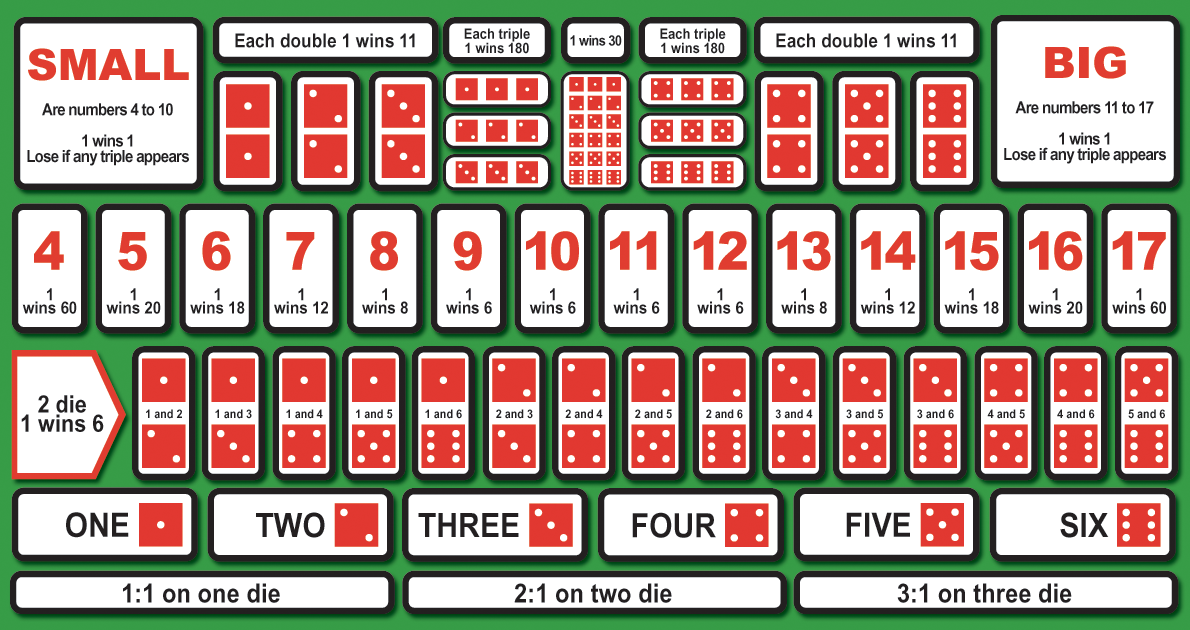
The layout of a sic bo table

Sic bo (Chinese: 骰寶), also known as tai sai (大細), dai siu (大小), big and small or hi-lo, is an unequal game of chance of ancient Chinese origin played with three dice. Grand hazard and chuck-a-luck are variants, both of English origin. The literal meaning of sic bo is "precious dice", while dai siu and dai sai mean "big [or] small".

Sic Bo is a casino game, popular in Asia and widely played (as dai siu) in casinos in Macau. It is played in the Philippines as hi-lo. It was introduced to the United States by Chinese immigrants in the early 20th century, and can now be found in most American casinos in the western half of the country. Since 2002, it has been played legally in licensed casinos in the United Kingdom.

Gameplay involves betting that a certain condition (e.g. that all three dice will roll the same) will be satisfied by a roll of the dice.

== Gameplay ==
All potential wagers

Players place their bets on areas of a table that have been divided into named scoring boxes. The dealer then picks up a small chest containing the dice, which they close and shake, before opening the chest to reveal the combination. There are 216 (6^{3}) equally likely possible combinations, though only 56 of them are distinguishable.

=== Comparison to craps ===
Sic bo is one of two casino games involving dice, the other being craps. Sic bo is strictly a game of immediate chance because every roll on the dice results a win or loss on any bet. In craps, some bets require a certain pattern of successive rolls before they can become winning or losing bets.

== Betting options ==
The betting areas on the table show that players have the option to wager on one, two, or three dice.

A one-die wager pays out when the number which is bet shows up on one, two, or all three dice; the specific payout depends on how many dice show the number.

A two-dice wager pays out when the two numbers which are bet shows up on two of the three dice. The combination of numbers may be different numbers or the same number (a double or pair), which has a higher payout.

A three-dice wager pays out when the three numbers which are bet shows up on all three dice. The combination of numbers may be all three different, a pair and another number, or all three the same (a triple). An alternative wager is for the three dice to show three of four specific numbers.

In addition, the three-dice wagers include those which pay out on the sum total of all three dice. The three-dice sum wagers either are on a range ("small" being a sum of 4 through 10, inclusive; "big" being a sum of 11 through 17, inclusive), a specific sum, or whether the sum is odd or even. All of the three-dice sum wagers lose when the three dice roll a triple. The most common wagers are "Big" and "Small".

Name	Dice	Wagering event	Probability	United Kingdom		New Zealand		Austria		Macau & Hong Kong		No house edge
Name	Dice	Wagering event	Probability	Odds	House Edge	Odds	House Edge	Odds	House Edge	Odds	House Edge	Odds
Big (大)	3 (sum)	The total score will be from 11 to 17 (inclusive) with the exception of a triple	48.61%	1 to 1	2.78%	1 to 1	2.78%	1 to 1	2.78%	1 to 1	2.78%	37 to 35
Small (小)	3 (sum)	The total score will be from 4 to 10 (inclusive) with the exception of a triple	48.61%	1 to 1	2.78%	1 to 1	2.78%	1 to 1	2.78%	1 to 1	2.78%	37 to 35
Odd	3 (sum)	The total score will be an odd number with the exception of a triple	48.61%	1 to 1	2.78%	1 to 1	2.78%	1 to 1	2.78%	1 to 1	2.78%	37 to 35
Even	3 (sum)	The total score will be an even number with the exception of a triple	48.61%	1 to 1	2.78%	1 to 1	2.78%	1 to 1	2.78%	1 to 1	2.78%	37 to 35
Specific 'Triples' or 'Alls' (Note: All one: 圍一, All two: 圍二, All three: 圍三, All four: 圍四, All five: 圍五, or All six: 圍六)	3	A specific number will appear on all three dice	0.46%	180 to 1	16.2%	180 to 1	16.2%	190 to 1	11.6%	150 to 1	30.09%	215 to 1
Specific Doubles	2	A specific number will appear on at least two of the three dice	7.41%	10 to 1	18.52%	11 to 1	11.11%	11 to 1	11.11%	8 to 1	33.33%	25 to 2
Any Triple or All 'Alls' (全圍)	3	Any of the triples will appear	2.78%	30 to 1	13.89%	31 to 1	11.11%	33 to 1	5.56%	24 to 1	30.56%	35 to 1
Three Dice Total (Note: A specific total score in the range of 4 to 17, inclusive)	3 (sum)	4 or 17	1.39%	60 to 1	15.28%	62 to 1	12.5%	65 to 1	8.33%	50 to 1	27.78%	71 to 1
Three Dice Total	3 (sum)	5 or 16	2.78%	30 to 1	13.89%	31 to 1	11.11%	33 to 1	5.56%	18 to 1	47.22%	35 to 1
Three Dice Total	3 (sum)	6 or 15	4.17%	18 to 1	12.04%	18 to 1	12.04%	19 to 1	7.41%	14 to 1	30.56%	103 to 5
Three Dice Total	3 (sum)	7 or 14	6.94%	12 to 1	9.72%	12 to 1	9.72%	12 to 1	9.72%	12 to 1	9.72%	67 to 5
Three Dice Total	3 (sum)	8 or 13	9.72%	8 to 1	12.5%	8 to 1	12.5%	8 to 1	12.5%	8 to 1	12.5%	65 to 7
Three Dice Total	3 (sum)	9 or 12	11.57%	7 to 1	7.41%	7 to 1	7.41%	7 to 1	7.41%	6 to 1	18.98%	191 to 25
Three Dice Total	3 (sum)	10 or 11	12.5%	6 to 1	12.5%	6 to 1	12.5%	6 to 1	12.5%	6 to 1	12.5%	7 to 1
Dice Combinations	2	Two of the dice will show a specific combination of two different numbers (for example, a 3 and a 4)	13.89%	6 to 1	2.78%	6 to 1	2.78%	6 to 1	2.78%	5 to 1; 6 to 1	16.67% 2.78%	31 to 5
Single Die Bet	1	The specific number 1, 2, 3, 4, 5, or 6 will appear on one, two, or all three dice	1: 34.72% 2: 6.94% 3: 0.46%	1: 1 to 1; 2: 2 to 1; 3: 3 to 1	7.87%	1: 1 to 1; 2: 2 to 1; 3: 12 to 1	3.7%	1: 1 to 1; 2: 2 to 1; 3: 12 to 1	3.7%	1: 1 to 1; 2: 2 to 1; 3: 3 to 1	7.87%	1: 1 to 1; 2: 3 to 1; 3: 5 to 1 (simplest version)
Four Number Combination	3	Any three of the four numbers in one of the following specific combinations will appear: 6, 5, 4, 3; 6, 5, 3, 2; 5, 4, 3, 2; or 4, 3, 2, 1	11.11%	7 to 1	11.11%	7 to 1	11.11%			7 to 1	11.11%	8 to 1
Three Single Number Combination	3	The dice will show a specific combination of three different numbers	2.78%	30 to 1	13.89%	30 to 1	13.89%	33 to 1	5.6%	30 to 1	55.56%	35 to 1
Specific Double and Single Number Combination	3	Two of the dice will show a specific double and the third die will show a specific, different number	1.39%	50 to 1	29.17%	60 to 1	15.28%			50 to 1	29.17%	71 to 1

== Variants ==
Grand Hazard game/betting board

Grand Hazard is a gambling game of English origin, also played with three dice. It is distinct from the older game Hazard, another gambling game of English origin, played with two dice. The dice are either thrown with a cup or rolled down a chute containing a series of inclined planes ("hazard chute") that tumble the dice as they fall. Compared to Sic bo, Grand Hazard offers only three-dice and single-die wagers. The bettors can choose to wager on triples, which are known as "raffles", three-dice sums, which include large/small, even/odd, and specific sum bets, or on single die values. Successfully wagering on a raffle of one specific number pays out at 180 to 1. The single die bets are also known as Chuck Number bets, which operate and pay out identically to chuck-a-luck.

Chuck-a-luck, also known as "sweat cloth", "chuckerluck" and "bird cage", is a variant in the United States which has its origins in Grand Hazard. The three dice are kept in a device that resembles a wire-frame bird cage and that pivots about its centre. The dealer rotates the cage end over end, with the dice landing on the bottom. Bettors make single-number wagers, paying out 1:1 if one die matches the number picked, 2:1 if two dice match, and 3:1 if all three dice match (all three dice showing the same number); sometimes, the appearance of any "triple" is considered an additional wager, paying out at 30 to 1 (or thereabouts). Chuck-a-luck was once common in Nevada casinos but is now rare, frequently having been replaced by Sic Bo tables.

== See also ==
- Cee-lo, a gambling game played with three six-sided dice
