= Chō-han =

Traditional Japanese gambling game

Chō-Han Bakuchi
Dice game using two dice
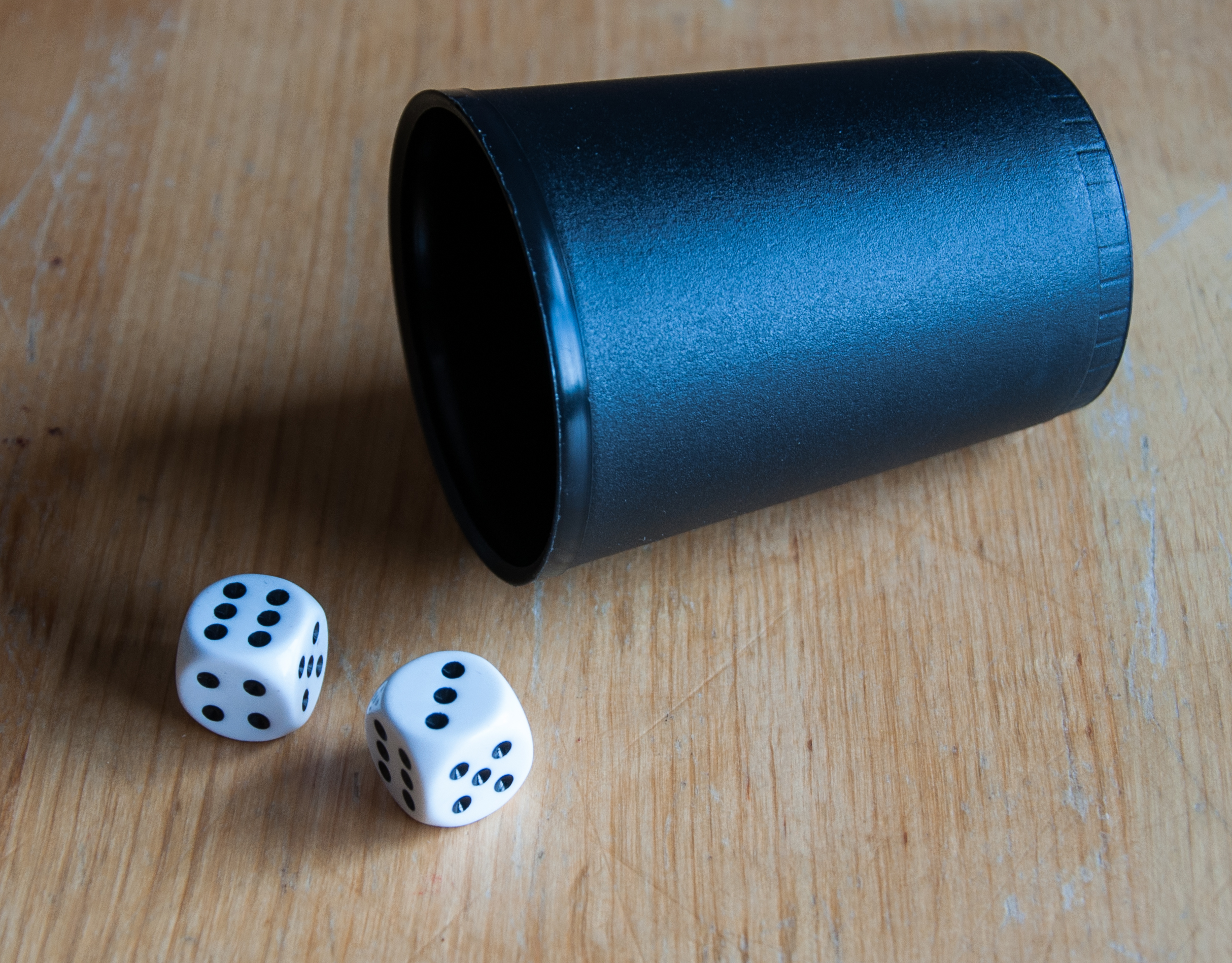
- Two dice, rolling 6 and 3, giving a sum of 9 (odd bets win) in the game of Chō-han.
- Other names: Chō-Han (丁半); Even-odd
- Chance: complete
- Materials required: 2× six-sided dice
- Synonyms: Chō-Han

Chō-Han Bakuchi or simply Chō-Han (丁半) is a traditional Japanese gambling game using dice.

== Gameplay ==
The game uses two standard six-sided dice, which are shaken in a bamboo cup or bowl by a dealer. The cup is then overturned onto the floor. Players then place their wagers on whether the sum total of numbers showing on the two dice will be "Chō" (even) or "Han" (odd). The dealer then removes the cup, displaying the dice. The winners collect their money.

Depending on the situation, the dealer will sometimes act as the house, collecting all losing bets. More often, the players will bet against each other (this requires an equal number of players betting on odd and even) and the house will collect a set percentage of winning bets.

Of the 36 possible outcomes, there are six distinct doubles that result in an even (丁) outcome (e.g., (1,1), (2,2), etc.) and 30 pairings of different numbers: 18 odd sums, and 12 even sums.

Chō-Han outcomes
出目	1	2	3	4	5	6
1	（1，1） ピンゾロの丁	（1，2） イチニの半	（1，3） サンミチの丁	（1，4） ヨイチの半	（1，5） グイチの丁	（1，6） イチロクの半
2	（2，1） イチニの半	（2，2） ニゾロの丁	（2，3） サニの半	（2，4） シニの丁	（2，5） グニの半	（2，6） ニロクの丁
3	（3，1） サンミチの丁	（3，2） サニの半	（3，3） サンゾロの丁	（3，4） シソウの半	（3，5） グサンの丁	（3，6） サブロクの半
4	（4，1） ヨイチの半	（4，2） シニの丁	（4，3） シソウの半	（4，4） シゾロの丁	（4，5） グシの半	（4，6） シロクの丁
5	（5，1） グイチの丁	（5，2） グニの半	（5，3） グサンの丁	（5，4） グシの半	（5，5） ゴゾロの丁	（5，6） ゴロクの半
6	（6，1） イチロクの半	（6，2） ニロクの丁	（6，3） サブロクの半	（6，4） シロクの丁	（6，5） ゴロクの半	（6，6） ロクゾロの丁

== Culture ==
The game was a mainstay of the bakuto, itinerant gamblers in old Japan, and is still played by the modern yakuza. In a traditional Chou-Han setting, players sit on a tatami floor. The dealer sits in the formal seiza position and is often shirtless (to prevent accusations of cheating), exposing his elaborate tattoos. The rule also applies to female dealers. For this reason, they wear sarashi to preserve modesty.

Many Japanese films, especially chambara and yakuza movies, feature Chou-Han scenes. It is also a playable minigame in many of the Ryū ga Gotoku (Yakuza) series of video games.
