= Cacho (Bolivian dice game) =

Dice game

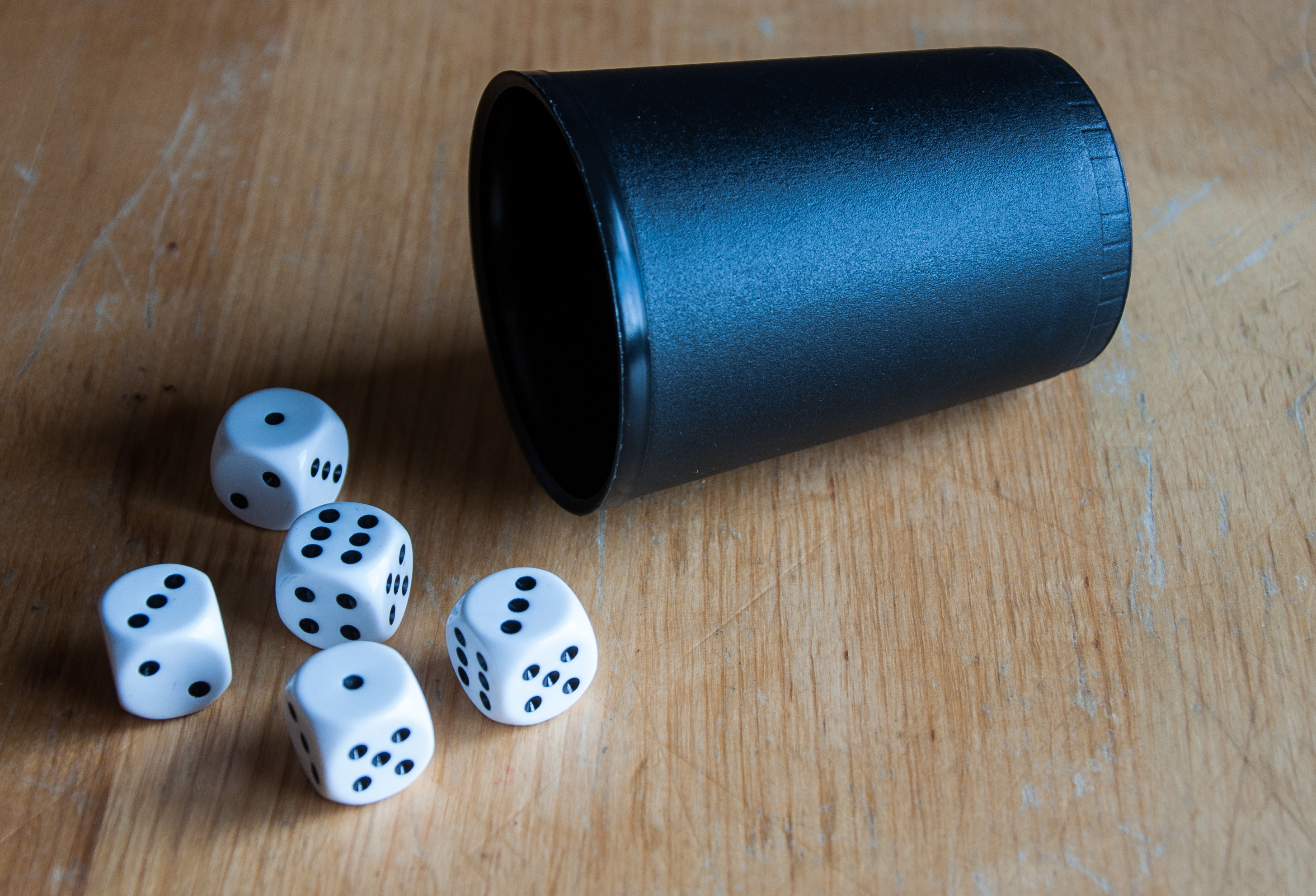
Cacho is played with five dice and a cup

Cacho is a popular dice game from Latin America. It is similar to Yahtzee/Yatzy. The purpose of the game is to roll five dice and score points from their combinations. The dice are rolled from a leather cup.

Many versions of cacho exist. The main difference between versions is allowing a third roll of the dice, and instead making the turned dice (see below) optional. This article describes the Bolivian "cacho alalay", which is the most common version played in tournaments organised in Cochabamba.

== History ==
The game is based on Generala, which in turn comes from European dice poker, but it is not known exactly how cacho alalay appeared. One theory is that the alalay version comes from Potosí in southern Bolivia, gained popularity in Cochabamba and from there spread to the rest of the country.

Across all of Latin America, different dice games are called "cacho" and use the same distinctive leather cup.

== Rules ==
One or more players can participate. There are special rules for how to play doubles or teams. Each player's score is recorded in a shape with nine open squares and a slash, in total eleven cases, see below. Since this only requires five lines on a piece of paper, printed score forms are not needed. Keeping score is handled by one of the players or by a non-player appointed to keep the score.

Players take turns rolling the dice once or twice each. Points are awarded for one combination at a time.

Getting one of the center combinations on the first throw, "de mano", is scored higher. If no combination can be found, the player returns one or more dice to the cup and roll them again, "de huevo". Rolling all five dice again is permitted, and in that case the second throw is also counted as "de mano".

After the second throw, the player must pick one of the dice to turn over. This would turn a six into a one, as the total of opposite sides of a die always equals 7. The player may turn over one more die, if that improves the score. If the second throw is a roll of all five dice and the player gets a straight, a full house, four of a kind, or five of a kind, this is a valid score and no die has to be turned over.

If not even the second throw results in a useful combination, the player must cross out one of the remaining blank positions on the score chart. Crossing out a remaining position is not allowed if even one of the dice can score a point, no matter how low.

The game is over when one of four conditions is met:

1. All of the players have used each of the eleven positions on their score charts. The score is tallied and the player with the highest score wins.
2. If a player rolls five of a kind (la grande) in a single throw, that player wins. The throw is called la dormida, the player "has fallen asleep".
3. If a player scores the highest points on the three center combinations (straight, full house, four of a kind) and in addition scores at least one grande, that player wins. This is called la panza de oro, "the golden belly".
4. If a player has at least four of a kind in all the number values (ones, twos, threes, fours, fives, sixes) and in addition scores at least one grande, that player wins.

== Score chart ==
Scores are written into a grid, as follows:

ones (balas)	straight (escalera) 25 / 20 p	fours (cuadras)
twos (tontos)	full house (casa/full) 35 / 30 p	fives (quinas)
threes (trenes)	four of a kind (póquer) 45 /40 p	sixes (senas)
	la grande 50 p / la grande 50 p	

For ones through sixes the pips are added up, so that three ones means a score of 3 points and three sixes means a score of 18 points. For the center combinations, fixed points are awarded regardless of the numbers used.

Straight (escalera, "the stairs") can be a one, two, three, four, and five, or a two, three, four, five, and six, or a three, four, five, six, and one. A player who rolls this with the first throw ("de mano") is awarded 25 points. A player who rolls this with the second throw ("de huevo") is awarded 20 points. If the second throw uses all five dice, this too is counted as "de mano" and is awarded 25 points.

Full house (full or casa, "the house") is two of a kind and three of a different kind, for example a two, two, three, three, and three. A player who rolls this with the first throw ("de mano") is awarded 35 points. A player who rolls this with the second throw ("de huevo") is awarded 30 points. If the second throw uses all five dice, this too is counted as "de mano" and is awarded 35 points.

Four of a kind (póquer, "poker"). A player who rolls this with the first throw ("de mano") is awarded 45 points. A player who rolls this with the second throw ("de huevo") is awarded 40 points. If the second throw uses all five dice, this too is counted as "de mano" and is awarded 45 points.

La grande is five of a kind. It is awarded 50 points, and there are two spaces for grandes in a game. A player who rolls la grande in a throw with all five dice ("de mano") wins the game regardless of who is in the lead at that point – this roll is called "la dormida".

== Notation ==
The designation de mano means "from the hand", and the person keeping the score can use a hand as a symbol instead of writing numbers for the center combinations.

The designation de huevo menas "from the egg", and the person keeping the score can use an egg as a symbol instead of writing numbers for the center combinations. Thus, to avoid confusion, discarded positions on the score chart should be marked with a cross, not with a zero.

La grande can, instead of numbers, be marked for points using a dollar sign, $. The two possible grandes are noted below the position for four of a kind, separated by a slash, /.
