= Games related to Yahtzee =

A number of related games under the Yahtzee brand have been produced. They all commonly use dice as the primary tool for game play, but all differ generally. As Yahtzee itself has been sold since 1954, the variants released over the years are more recent in comparison, with the oldest one, Triple Yahtzee, developed in 1972, eighteen years after the introduction of the parent game.

This article outlines each of Yahtzee's known variants, as well as brief descriptions of how they are played. Except for the last variant, all are ordered according to when each variant first appeared under the Yahtzee name. Some of these variants may currently be out of production as they have used older logos.

The parent game is sometimes referred to in this article as "standard Yahtzee" to differentiate it from the variant games that almost use the same mechanics and rules.

== Triple Yahtzee ==
Triple Yahtzee, produced since 1972, is basically like playing three games of standard Yahtzee at the same time. Players score each of the thirteen Yahtzee categories three times, one for each of the scoresheet's columns marked "One," "Two," and "Three." However, players have the discretion of not only choosing the category at which to classify the current combination but also choosing which column the score would go. Combinations don't even have to appear three times in succession.

All scores entered in the three columns are entered as is. However, when the total scores for all three columns are obtained, the scores in the second and third columns are doubled and tripled respectively, and then added to the subtotal in the first column to form the grand total for the entire game.

Like in standard Yahtzee, there are differently colored chips for Bonus Yahtzees. They are awarded when all three Yahtzee boxes have scores in them and have been used either in the Upper and Lower Sections. The color of the chip, which may be colored white, blue, or red, depends on which column the Yahtzee has entered. These chips are worth 100, 200, and 300 points respectively. Since rolling Yahtzees are rare and rolling a fourth one is even rarer, bonuses are not indicated in the scoresheets and are only added to the grand total at the end of the game.

Because of the scoring process, it is possible to score 2,250 points in a single game, which is the maximum 375 points in each of the three columns and excluding Yahtzee bonuses, which are added at the end.

Triple Yahtzee is no longer sold as a game set. However, score cards for the game are still being sold (using the current logo) for owners of standard Yahtzee sets. The game is also included in GameHouse's Yahtzee game for Windows.

== Challenge Yahtzee ==
Selling since 1974, Challenge Yahtzee was marketed as a "fast paced" variant of the parent game. It is played like the parent game, but its difference lies on the fact the players make decisions on the common rolls at the same time.

A total of 25 dice are used in this game. Five larger common dice are used only in the first roll to be used by all players. The smaller dice (called "markers" in this game) are to be used by the individual players to denote the dice one would keep for the subsequent rolls. These smaller dice are held in individual slots on the tray provided. Players have their own discretions on which of their own individual dice should be kept. The second step involves the common roll for the least amount of empty slots for each player. The result of each common roll should be duplicated by all players, depending on the empty cells each player has. The second step ends when all players have their slots filled. The third step is the same as the second, but the arrangement of the dice for each player will be the final one.

Scoring in this game is the same as in standard Yahtzee.

== Word Yahtzee ==
In Word Yahtzee, which was produced in 1978 and developed from the game Scribbage, players roll seven dice and within one minute (hence the hourglass provided in each Word Yahtzee set) must form words which correspond to points. Each side of every die is printed like a Scrabble tile with a letter and small subscripted number on the lower right corner. One side of one die is marked with a diamond, which acts like the blank tile in Scrabble (can represent any letter, but will have no value).

The corresponding scoresheet, like the parent game, has an Upper and Lower Section. In the Upper Section, points are scored and marked for two- to six-letter words, with each word determined by the point values of its letters. The player is awarded 35 points if the total score in the Upper Section is at least 45. In the Lower Section are seven scoring categories: One Word, Two Words (at the same turn), Three Words (at the same turn), All Consonants, All Vowels (the consonant Y is considered a vowel in this game), Yahtzee Word (a seven-letter-word), and Chance.

Of course, a word has to be a valid Scrabble word before it is scored, except in the All Consonants, All Vowels and Chance categories, although the pronoun "I" and the indefinite article "a" are also considered words.

== Jackpot Yahtzee ==
Jackpot Yahtzee, which started marketing in 1980, uses dice bearing symbols usually found in slot machines and makes use of 16-space triangular racks which are utilized much the same as the rack used in Connect Four. The aim of the game is to get the best accumulative score at the end of three rounds of play.

Four dice are rolled, having symbols which appear a certain number of sides in each die depending on their worth. Those symbols are: dollar signs, bells, oranges, and cherries. When at least two of a symbol appear on the four dice, a tile matching the symbol and inserted into the rack. Points are scored when tiles are lined horizontally or diagonally (never vertically).

== Casino Yahtzee ==
Casino Yahtzee, which made an appearance in 1986, is said to combine the suspense of a gambling game with Yahtzee strategy, as well as keeping track of the movements of one's opponents.

Each player uses a 51-space game board. Thirty of these spaces represent the faces of the five dice used in the game: a blue die numbered 1-6, an orange one 2-7, a magenta one 3-8, a green one 4-9, and a red one 5-10. These are the player's personal places. The remaining twelve spaces are score spaces. When a player obtains a score space, he/she gains its value and its ownership by covering this score with a white chip and the others doing the same on their boards so no other player can get the same score space. A scorekeeper keeps track of the players' scores.

A player's turn consists of rolling the dice to obtain five numbers. This is done by either rolling all five dice at once or rolling at least one die several times to meet the required five numbers. Then the player covers those numbers and the colors obtained using black chips. If a number is already covered, it still counts one of the five numbers.

Points are scored by "closing a row," i.e. covering all numbers of a single color, covering a sequence of numbers or all numbers that repeat. A string corresponds to a score space, and therefore points for that player. All of a player's actions must be announced to both the scorekeeper and all other players; failure to do so might result in a player closing the same row and score those points. As mentioned earlier, only one player can use a score space.

A player can also go for a bonus by attempting to roll the five dice and show different numbers. If the roll turns up sequential numbers, a Rainbow bonus is scored, doubling the total bonus points.

The game ends when all rows are closed and scored. The scorekeeper totals all the points obtained by each player. The player with the highest score wins the game.

== Showdown Yahtzee ==
Showdown Yahtzee, which appeared in 1991, is a board game which makes use of the concepts and scoring categories in Yahtzee. Its gameplay is divided into two parts: Placement Mode and Showdown Mode. Six dice are used in the game, five to form the combinations (the combination dice) and a differently-colored one to move a player's piece around the board (the movement die).

In Placement Mode, players take turns moving their pieces around a sixteen-space game board clockwise. The object of this mode is to place twelve cards, one for the lower twelve of the thirteen combinations in standard Yahtzee. The Yahtzee combination is not among them, but such a combination has a special purpose to be explained later.

When a player lands on a blank space, that player would roll the combination dice to establish a certain combination for that space. Once such a combination is established, a card corresponding to that combination is placed on the space and an appropriate number of chips is stacked on the card. Each chip is worth ten points. The chips also signify a player's control on that combination.

When a player lands on a covered space with an established combination, the player's reaction depends on whose chips are on that space. If the chips are the player's own, one can reroll the movement die and go further or try to increase the chips on that space by beating the previous roll. If the chips are of an opponent's, one can "steal" the card by equalling or bettering the number of chips already on that card. If successful, the chips are returned to the previous owner and the current player places his/her own chips on the card. A player's turn ends when the player succeeds or fails in increasing his score on his own card or in stealing another player's card.

When a player's piece lands on a corner space called a Wild Space, that player can choose to place a desired unestablished card on any empty space or steal any established card from an opponent. If successful, the player can move to the nearest empty space and place the won card there or move to the space to be stolen depending on the objective. The Wild Space's power also applies when a player rolls a Yahtzee; this will not affect the current space where the player's piece is placed unless the player decides to use that space.

When all twelve combination cards are in place at the board, the game shifts to Showdown Mode where players can now steal cards from each other. Rules for moving the pieces, increasing a score in one's own card, and stealing an opponent's card apply in this mode. A player's turn continues until he/she fails to steal a card.

The game ends when all players have taken one turn in Showdown Mode. The player with the most chips on the board is declared the winner.

== Yahtzee Texas Hold'em ==
Yahtzee Texas Hold 'em, marketed in 2005, combines the concepts of the parent game and the poker variant Texas hold 'em. In this game, twenty dice are used, one set of five for each of the colors red, yellow, black, and white.

Players each pick two dice from a bag and rolls them under one's personal cup. These would be the player's personal dice. Then five "community" dice are chosen, then rolled much like same way as the cards in Texas Hold 'em poker. Players try to make the best five-dice "hand" out of the seven community and personal dice.

Combinations used in this game, ordered here from weakest to strongest, are: Two Pair, Three-of-a-Kind, Full House, Straight (five-dice sequence), Four-of-a-Kind, Flush, regular Yahtzee (a Yahtzee of differently colored dice), Straight Flush, and Yahtzee Flush (a Yahtzee of the same color).

== Last Chance/Yahtzee Deluxe Poker ==
The game Last Chance, which started marketing in 1994, is a combination of contract bidding and Yahtzee with side betting. It was renamed Yahtzee Deluxe Poker in 2005; although the values are 30% higher and some components have a redesign, the mechanics of the game remain the same. Described below is some of the mechanics as described in Yahtzee Deluxe Poker.

There are 36 cards used in the game, each bearing a combination, the number of rolls in which the combination should be achieved, and the value of the card. Seven of these cards are placed in the tray provided and are used in the game.

A card on the tray is turned face up. Players bid for the right to roll the dice. The highest bidder would be win that right. Afterwards, the other players bet on whether the player who is rolling would achieve the combination in the rolls indicated or not. If the player who rolls achieves the combination within the number of rolls stated by the card, that player wins the value of the card, the card itself, and all bets against him. Otherwise, the rolling player loses his/her bid to the bank; the card and the dice that match it stay and the process (i.e. the right to roll for the remaining dice and all subsequent betting) is repeated until the combination on the card is achieved by any player. A new card, and therefore a new combination, then comes into play.

Certain cards have Joker spaces (denoted by the letter J) which can stand for any number. If there is more than one Joker in the card, the player must decide which value each Joker must represent.

A player can also go for the "All In" option, especially if that player is almost out of chips and/or has not won a card. This option effectively enables the player to bet all of his/her remaining chips and become the rolling player. Certain elimination from the game awaits the rolling player should that player lose. The "All In" option can only be used once, so a player must decide when it is best to use it. In Last Chance, this option is called "Last Chance" because the player who uses it would have one last chance to stay in the game, hence the original name.

A player must win at least one card in order to win the entire game. The player who has the most chips after the seven chosen cards are played and won is declared the winner.

== Yahtzee Turbo ==
Yahtzee Turbo, released in 2006, is another fast-paced variant which makes use of 48 assorted cards, multi-colored dice, and a large die-shaped unit, called the Big Die, which acts as a timer and game host.

The 48 assorted cards indicate six types of Yahtzee hands: Three-of-a-Kind, Four-of-a-Kind, Large Straight, Small Straight, Full House, and Chance. Each player has five of these cards. The Big Die is pressed to start the timer and one player tries to roll the dice in the combination on the top card as many times as one can before the time expires. If that objective is achieved, the Big Die is again pressed to stop the timer. After the Big Die gives a congratulatory message, it then tells the player what to do next with the card. If the time expires before the objective combination is met, the Big Die simply tells the player what to do next. That player's turn ends after one performs the Big Die's instructions.

At times, the Big Die requires a player to obtain a Yahtzee within the traditional three rolls. It also adjusts its timer based on how well players do in the game.

The player who discards all of his/her cards is declared the winner.

== Power Yahtzee ==
In 2007, Winning Moves Games developed Power Yahtzee. It includes a sixth multiplier die called a "Power die" and an expanded scoresheet.

== Yahtzee Free for All ==
Yahtzee Free for All, designed by Richard Borg in 2008, is a variant that uses a free-for-all format for two to six players. The components come in a hexagonal box made to look like a 3D image of a die. The inner box stores the components, while the outer box, when unfolded, doubles as the playing mat. The components compose of 30 dice (a set of five for each player), a set of chips and 36 combination cards bearing the 13 Yahtzee categories with different point values.

On the onset, the combination cards (Yahtzee cards separated beforehand) are shuffled and three are laid out on the playing mat. One player aims to form one the combinations using one's set of dice in three rolls. When successful, the player takes the card and places on his part of the field, ending one's turn. A player can steal another's card by forming a higher combination than the original one that player had formed (e.g. 2-3-4-5-6 is already enough to steal the Large Straight card from someone with the 1-2-3-4-5 combination). A card held on one player's side of the mat is open for stealing until play passes back to the holder of the card, at which point, that player "banks" or keeps that card from the mat, guaranteeing points and preparing to get another combination or steal another player's card.

At any time, a Yahtzee is rolled, a Yahtzee card, worth 10 points, is awarded to the player who rolls it and is added to their total.

Chips, worth a point each, are also present in the game for increased play. A chip is laid on the center area of the mat at the front of each of the three cards there. This happens when a player "busts" (unable to make one of the combinations on the mat), steals a card, or rolls a Yahtzee. Chips are won by a player when one of the anteed combinations in the center is achieved.

Play ends when either the cards at the center or the chips are exhausted. The player with the most points, which is determined by the number of the chips and combination cards a player has won, wins the game.

== Yahtzee Jr. ==
Yahtzee Jr. is a simplified variant meant to be played by younger children ages four and above. There are many Yahtzee Jr. products, all typically tied into several children's titles or cartoon characters, like Mickey Mouse and Pokémon. The different variants are all decorative, as they all use the same mechanics.

At the onset, players use the five tokens of the same color. Each token represents a character of each of the five dice. Points are scored by moving a token over a common scoreboard covering a column corresponding to the number of times that character appears on the dice. Only one token can occupy a scoreboard space at a time, and a different character must be scored on each turn. Also, once a token is placed on the scoreboard, it cannot be moved. The score of zero for a character is denoted by placing that character's token over its picture in the unmarked column.

Each die also includes a sixth character that acts as a wild card. If such a character appears, it can represent any of the five objective characters.

The game ends when all turns are taken and scored. Points are totaled by adding the numbers of the columns where the character tokens are placed. The player with the highest total wins. In case of a tie, the winner is determined by rolling the highest number of wild card characters.

== Yahtzee Extreme ==
Yahtzee Extreme is a variation on the traditional game with new scoring options and themed games such as baseball, hockey, and Olympics. Some games use an additional die which allows for new scoring options such as 'Super Large', 'Super Yahtzee', 'Double Triple', and 'Triple Double'. Team-play and bonus rolls are also available. Yahtzee Extreme is available as a collection of score sheets. with all the new options and rules included.

== See also ==
- Generala, the Latin American equivalent of Yahtzee
- Kismet, a dice game similar to Yahtzee played with dice with 3 pip colors, utilizing a wider range of poker style combinations
- Yacht, the game upon which Yahtzee is based
- Yamb, a popular game in the Balkans, based on Yahtzee
- Yatzy, the Scandinavian version of Yahtzee
