= Game design =

Process of creating game content and rules

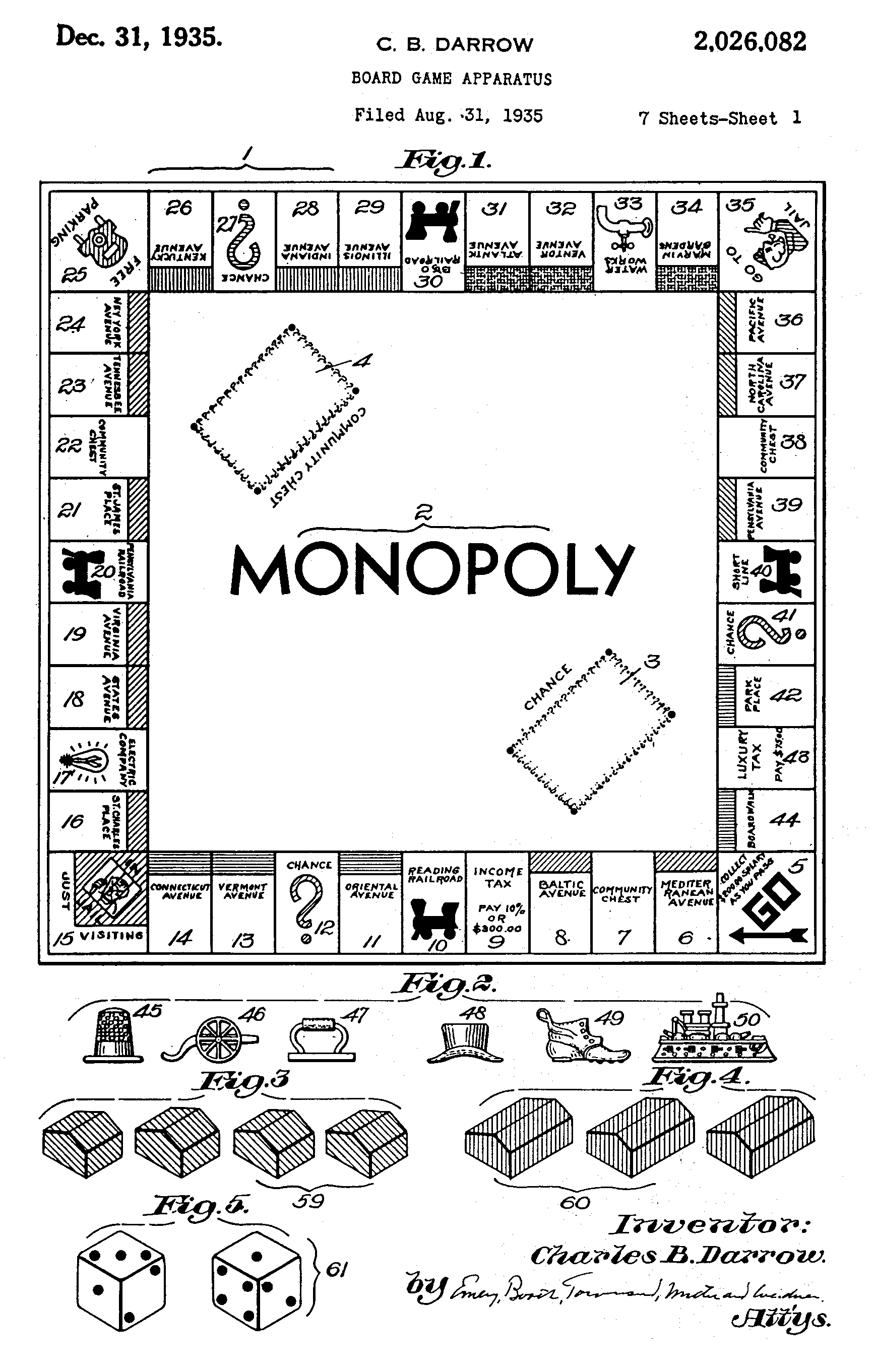
Charles Darrow's 1935 patent for Monopoly includes specific design elements developed during the prototype phase. Prototypes are common in the later stages of board game design, and "prototype circles" provide an opportunity for designers to play and critique each other's games.

Game design is the process of creating and shaping the mechanics, systems, rules, and gameplay of a game. Game design processes apply to board games, card games, dice games, casino games, role-playing games, sports, war games, or simulation games. In Elements of Game Design, game designer Robert Zubek defines game design by breaking it down into three elements:

- Game mechanics and systems, which are the rules and objects in the game.
- Gameplay, which is the interaction between the player and the mechanics and systems. In Chris Crawford on Game Design, the author summarizes gameplay as "what the player does".
- Player experience, which is how users feel when they are playing the game.

In academic research, game design falls within the field of game studies (not to be confused with game theory, which studies strategic decision making, primarily in non-game situations).

== Process of design ==
Game design is part of a game's development from concept to final form. Typically, the development process is iterative, with repeated phases of testing and revision. During revision, additional design or re-design may be needed.

=== Development team ===
==== Game designer ====
A game designer (or inventor) is a person who invents a game's concept, central mechanisms, rules, and themes. Game designers may work alone or in teams.

==== Game developer ====
A game developer is a person who fleshes out the details of a game's design, oversees its testing, and revises the game in response to player feedback.

Often game designers also do development work on the same project. However, some publishers commission extensive development of games to suit their target audience after licensing a game from a designer. For larger games, such as collectible card games, designers and developers work in teams with separate roles.

==== Game artist ====
A game artist creates visual art for games. Game artists are often vital to role-playing games and collectible card games.

Many graphic elements of games are created by the designer when producing a prototype of the game, revised by the developer based on testing, and then further refined by the artist and combined with artwork as a game is prepared for publication or release.

=== Concept ===
A game concept is an idea for a game, briefly describing its core play mechanisms, objectives, themes, and who the players represent.

A game concept may be pitched to a game publisher in a similar manner as film ideas are pitched to potential film producers. Alternatively, game publishers holding a game license to intellectual property in other media may solicit game concepts from several designers before picking one to design a game.

=== Design ===
During design, a game concept is fleshed out. Mechanisms are specified in terms of components (boards, cards, tokens, etc.) and rules. The play sequence and possible player actions are defined, as well as how the game starts, ends, and win conditions (if any).

=== Prototypes and play testing ===
A game prototype is a draft version of a game used for testing. Uses of prototyping include exploring new game design possibilities and technologies.

Play testing is a major part of game development. During testing, players play the prototype and provide feedback on its gameplay, the usability of its components, the clarity of its goals and rules, ease of learning, and entertainment value. During testing, various balance issues may be identified, requiring changes to the game's design. The developer then revises the design, components, presentation, and rules before testing it again. Later testing may take place with focus groups to test consumer reactions before publication.

== History ==
=== Folk process ===
Many games have ancient origins and were not designed in the modern sense, but gradually evolved over time through play. The rules of these games were not codified until early modern times and their features gradually developed and changed through the folk process. For example, sports (see history of sports), gambling, and board games are known, respectively, to have existed for at least nine thousand, six thousand, and four thousand years. Tabletop games played today whose descent can be traced from ancient times include chess, go, pachisi, mancala, and pick-up sticks. These games are not considered to have had a designer or been the result of a contemporary design process.

After the rise of commercial game publishing in the late 19th century, many games that had formerly evolved via folk processes became commercial properties, often with custom scoring pads or preprepared material. For example, the similar public domain games Generala, Yacht, and Yatzy led to the commercial game Yahtzee in the mid-1950s.

Today, many commercial games, such as Taboo, Balderdash, Pictionary, or Time's Up!, are descended from traditional parlour games. Adapting traditional games to become commercial properties is an example of game design. Similarly, many sports, such as soccer and baseball, are the result of folk processes, while others were designed, such as basketball, invented in 1891 by James Naismith.

=== New media ===
The first games in a new medium are frequently adaptations of older games. Later games often exploit the distinctive properties of a new medium. Adapting older games and creating original games for new media are both examples of game design.

Technological advances have provided new media for games throughout history. For example, accurate topographic maps produced as lithographs and provided free to Prussian officers helped popularize wargaming. Cheap bookbinding (printed labels wrapped around cardboard) led to mass-produced board games with custom boards. Inexpensive (hollow) lead figurine casting contributed to the development of miniature wargaming. Cheap custom dice led to poker dice. Flying discs led to Ultimate frisbee.

== Purposes ==
Games can be designed for entertainment, education, exercise or experimental purposes. Additionally, elements and principles of game design can be applied to other interactions, in the form of gamification. Games have historically inspired seminal research in the fields of probability, artificial intelligence, economics, and optimization theory. Applying game design to itself is a current research topic in metadesign.

=== Educational purposes ===
By learning through play (Note: a term used in education and psychology to describe how a child can learn to make sense of the world around them) children can develop social and cognitive skills, mature emotionally, and gain the self-confidence required to engage in new experiences and environments. Key ways that young children learn include playing, being with other people, being active, exploring and new experiences, talking to themselves, communicating with others, meeting physical and mental challenges, being shown how to do new things, practicing and repeating skills, and having fun.

Play develops children's content knowledge and provides children the opportunity to develop social skills, competencies, and disposition to learn. Play-based learning is based on a Vygotskian model of scaffolding where the teacher pays attention to specific elements of the play activity and provides encouragement and feedback on children's learning. When children engage in real-life and imaginary activities, play can be challenging in children's thinking. To extend the learning process, sensitive intervention can be provided with adult support when necessary during play-based learning.

== Design issues by game type ==
Different types of games pose specific game design issues.

=== Board games ===
Board game design is the development of rules and presentational aspects of a board game. When a player takes part in a game, it is the player's self-subjection to the rules that create a sense of purpose for the duration of the game. Maintaining the players' interest throughout the gameplay experience is the goal of board game design. To achieve this, board game designers emphasize different aspects such as social interaction, strategy, and competition, and target players of differing needs by providing for short versus long-play, and luck versus skill. Beyond this, board game design reflects the culture in which the board game is produced.

The most ancient board games known today are over 5000 years old. They are frequently abstract in character and their design is primarily focused on a core set of simple rules. Of those that are still played today, games like go (c. 400 BC), mancala (c. 700 AD), and chess (c. 600 AD) have gone through many presentational and/or rule variations. In the case of chess, for example, new variants are developed constantly, to focus on certain aspects of the game, or just for variation's sake.

Traditional board games date from the nineteenth and early twentieth century. Whereas ancient board game design was primarily focused on rules alone, traditional board games were often influenced by Victorian mores. Academic (e.g. history and geography) and moral didacticism were important design features for traditional games, and Puritan associations between dice and the Devil meant that early American game designers eschewed their use in board games entirely. Even traditional games that did use dice, like Monopoly (based on the 1906 The Landlord's Game), were rooted in educational efforts to explain political concepts to the masses. By the 1930s and 1940s, board game design began to emphasize amusement over education, and characters from comic strips, radio programmes, and (in the 1950s) television shows began to be featured in board game adaptations.

Recent developments in modern board game design can be traced to the 1980s in Germany, and have led to the increased popularity of "German-style board games" (also known as "Eurogames" or "designer games"). The design emphasis of these board games is to give players meaningful choices. This is manifested by eliminating elements like randomness and luck to be replaced by skill, strategy, and resource competition, by removing the potential for players to fall irreversibly behind in the early stages of a game, and by reducing the number of rules and possible player options to produce what Alan R. Moon has described as "elegant game design". The concept of elegant game design has been identified by The Boston Globe's Leon Neyfakh as related to Mihaly Csikszentmihalyi's the concept of "flow" from his 1990 book, "Flow: The Psychology of Optimal Experience".

Modern technological advances have had a democratizing effect on board game production, with services like Kickstarter providing designers with essential startup capital and tools like 3D printers facilitating the production of game pieces and board game prototypes. A modern adaptation of figure games are miniature wargames like Warhammer 40,000.

=== Card games ===
Card games can be designed as gambling games, such as Poker, or simply for fun, such as Go Fish. As cards are typically shuffled and revealed gradually during play, most card games involve randomness, either initially or during play, and hidden information, such as the cards in a player's hand.

How players play their cards, revealing information and interacting with previous plays as they do so, is central to card game design. In partnership card games, such as Bridge, rules limiting communication between players on the same team become an important part of the game design. This idea of limited communication has been extended to cooperative card games, such as Hanabi.

=== Dice games ===
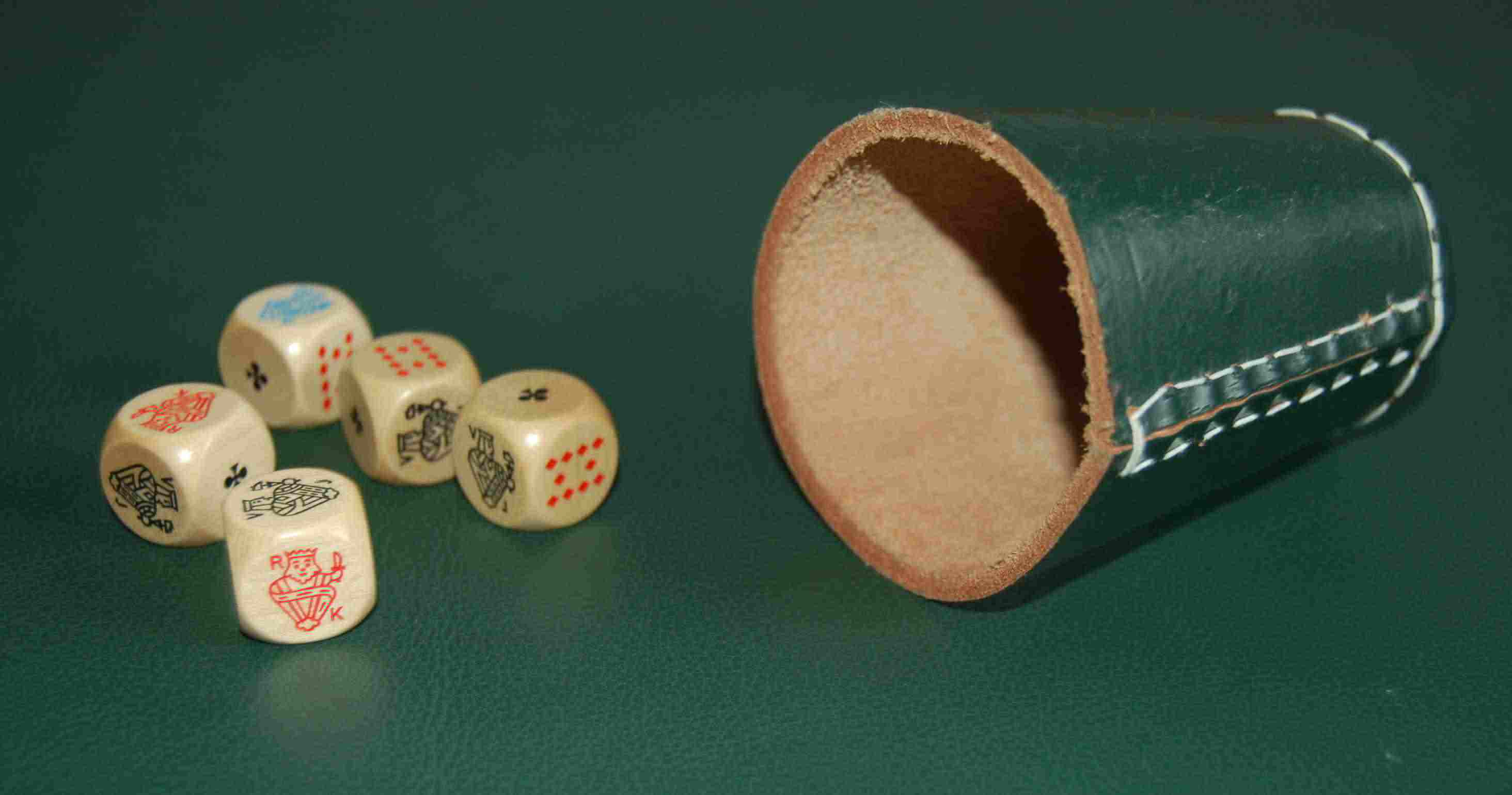
A set of poker dice and a dice cup

Dice games differ from card games in that each throw of the dice is an independent event, whereas the odds of a given card being drawn are affected by all the previous cards drawn or revealed from a deck. For this reason, dice game design often centers around forming scoring combinations and managing re-rolls, either by limiting their number, as in Yahtzee or by introducing a press-your-luck element, as in Can't Stop.

=== Casino games ===
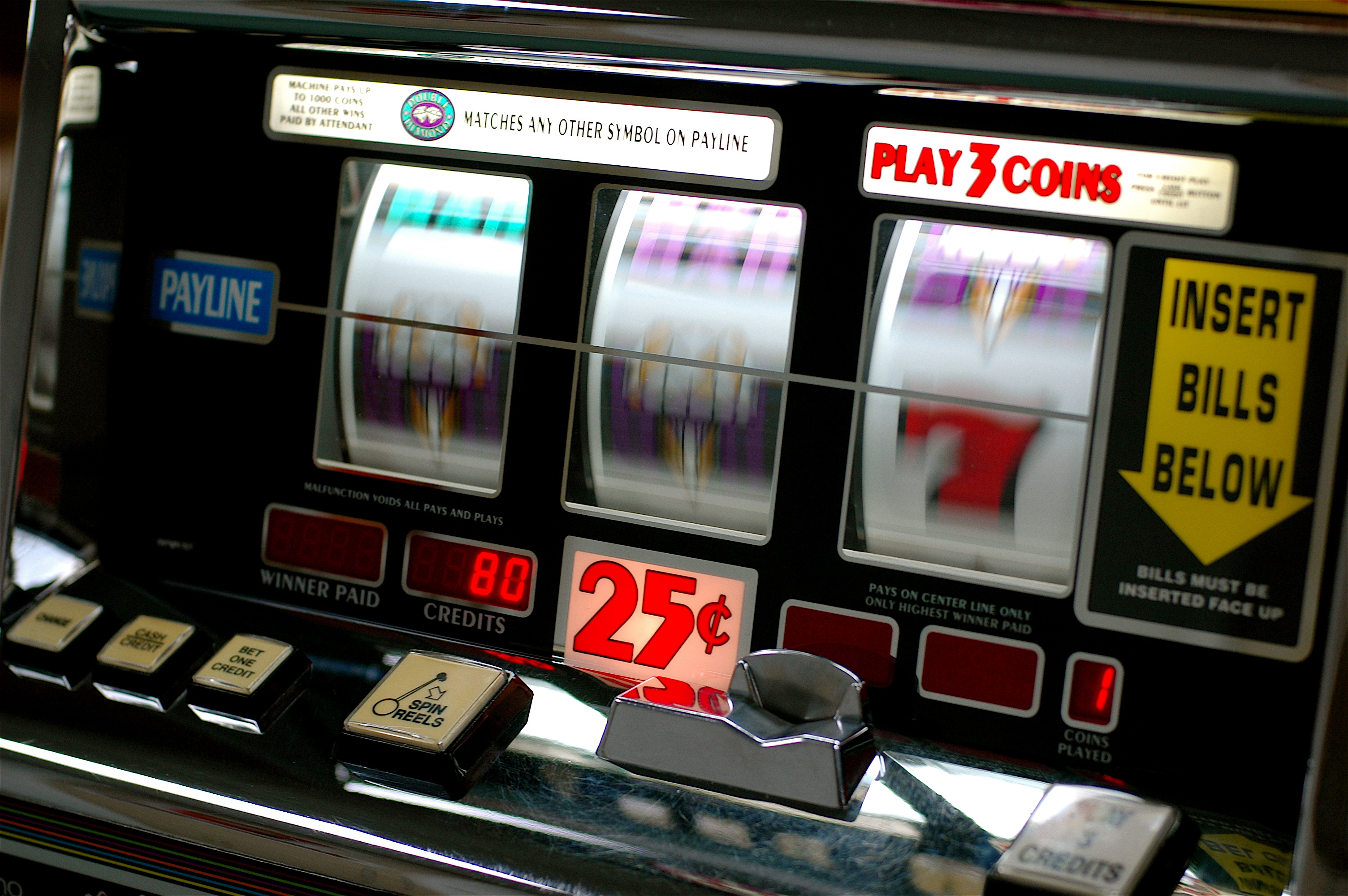
All casino games are designed to mathematically favor the house. The house edge for a slot machine can range widely between 2 and 15 percent.

Casino game design can entail the creation of an entirely new casino game, the creation of a variation on an existing casino game, or the creation of a new side bet on an existing casino game.

Casino game mathematician, Michael Shackleford has noted that it is much more common for casino game designers today to make successful variations than entirely new casino games. Gambling columnist John Grochowski points to the emergence of community-style slot machines in the mid-1990s, for example, as a successful variation on an existing casino game type.

Unlike the majority of other games which are designed primarily in the interest of the player, one of the central aims of casino game design is to optimize the house advantage and maximize revenue from gamblers. Successful casino game design works to provide entertainment for the player and revenue for the gambling house.

To maximise player entertainment, casino games are designed with simple easy-to-learn rules that emphasize winning (i.e. whose rules enumerate many victory conditions and few loss conditions), and that provide players with a variety of different gameplay postures (e.g. card hands). Player entertainment value is also enhanced by providing gamblers with familiar gaming elements (e.g. dice and cards) in new casino games.

To maximise success for the gambling house, casino games are designed to be easy for croupiers to operate and for pit managers to oversee.

The two most fundamental rules of casino game design are that the games must be non-fraudable (including being as nearly as possible immune from advantage gambling) and that they must mathematically favor the house winning. Shackleford suggests that the optimum casino game design should give the house an edge of smaller than 5%.

=== Tabletop role-playing games ===
The design of tabletop role-playing games typically requires the establishment of setting, characters, and gameplay rules or mechanics. After a role-playing game is produced, additional design elements are often devised by the players themselves. In many instances, for example, character creation is left to the players.

Early role-playing game theories developed on indie role-playing game design forums in the early 2000s.

== Game studies ==
Game design is a topic of study in the academic field of game studies. Game studies is a discipline that deals with the critical study of games, game design, players, and their role in society and culture. Prior to the late-twentieth century, the academic study of games was rare and limited to fields such as history and anthropology. As the video game revolution took off in the early 1980s, so did academic interest in games, resulting in a field that draws on diverse methodologies and schools of thought.

Social scientific approaches have concerned themselves with the question of, "What do games do to people?" Using tools and methods such as surveys, controlled laboratory experiments, and ethnography, researchers have investigated the impacts that playing games have on people and the role of games in everyday life.

Humanities approaches have concerned themselves with the question of, "What meanings are made through games?" Using tools and methods such as interviews, ethnographies, and participant observation, researchers have investigated the various roles that games play in people's lives and the meanings players assign to their experiences.

From within the game industry, central questions include, "How can we create better games?" and, "What makes a game good?" "Good" can be taken to mean different things, including providing an entertaining experience, being easy to learn and play, being innovative, educating the players, and/or generating novel experiences.

== See also ==
- Gamification
- List of game designers
- Play (activity)
- Video game design
