= Crag =

Crag may refer to:

- Crag (climbing), a cliff or group of cliffs, in any location, which is or may be suitable for climbing
- Crag (dice game), a dice game played with three dice
- Crag, Arizona, US
- Crag, West Virginia, US
- Crag and tail, a geological formation caused by the passage of a glacier over an area of hard rock
- Crag Group, a geological group outcropping in East Anglia, UK
  - Coralline Crag Formation
  - Norwich Crag Formation
  - Red Crag Formation
  - Wroxham Crag Formation, see Cromer Forest Bed
- Crag Hotel, Penang, Malaysia
- Crag Jones (born 1962), Welsh climber
- USS Crag (AM-214), a 1943 US Navy Admirable-class minesweeper
- The Crag, the final event in the Nickelodeon Guts action sports program
- Club de Radioaficionados de Guatemala, an amateur radio organization in Guatemala
- Constitutional Reform and Governance Act 2010, concerning United Kingdom constitutional law
- CRAG stands for Corrective Retrieval Augmented Generation

== See also ==
- Cragg (disambiguation)
