= Power Yahtzee =

Dice game

- Box cover and game layout
- Publishers: Winning Moves
- Players: 2 to 4
- Setup time: 5 minutes
- Playing time: 20-30 minutes
- Chance: High
- Age range: 8 and up
- Skills: Dice-rolling; Luck; Decision-making

Power Yahtzee is a variation on the classic dice game Yahtzee first published by Winning Moves Games USA in 2007. It includes a sixth multiplier die called a "Power die" and an expanded scoresheet. This game is no longer in production.

== Gameplay ==
The Power die is rolled with the five standard dice and shows how the point value of scoring category of the faces on the standard dice should be multiplied. Three faces of the Power die are marked "1," "2," and "3," which simply indicate that the score should be multiplied by the shown number. The three other faces denote special actions for the player:

- Freeze (symbolized by an anchor marked "1") stops the player from playing further in one's turn and must score immediately.
- Double (symbolized by two sails, the one at the front marked "2") enables the player to score in two different categories, each of which are doubled, on the same turn.
- Power (symbolized by a sunburst marked "P3", arranged vertically), if the player chooses to keep it for subsequent rolls, gives the player the option for a fourth roll, if one so wishes. The score obtained when this face comes up would be multiplied by three.

The scoresheet's Upper Section includes a Choice category, which the player would choose a specific number in a die, especially one that has its corresponding category already been scored. Because of the Power die, the Bonus score has also been increased. A score of fifty points is added if the score obtained in the Upper Section is at least 150 points, 100 if the score is at least 200 points, and 200 if it is at least 300 points.

The Lower Section adds a Two-Pair category which scores the total of all dice. It also doubles the Three-of-a-Kind, Four-of-a-Kind, Small-Straight, and Large-Straight categories. Additionally, the Yahtzee has three slots. The first Yahtzee is given a base score of 50 points, a second Yahtzee has a base value of 100 points, and a third would be worth 200 points.

== Other variants ==
Since Power Yahtzee was developed with the addition of a sixth die, it is also possible to play standard Yahtzee with a Power Yahtzee set by setting the Power die aside. Bonus chips and standard Yahtzee scoresheets are not included in a Power Yahtzee set, however; so, as a suggestion, one has to buy (or print) standard Yahtzee scoresheets and use poker chips or coins as improvised bonus chips.

GameHouse's Yahtzee game for Windows includes a "Power Yahtzee" game, but this one is different from the Winning Games set as this game is actually a multi-level version of standard Yahtzee with the use of special power-ups to help a player get ahead in a game and hinder an opponent from doing the same.

== See also ==
- Games related to Yahtzee
