= Craggs =

Craggs may refer to:

== Places ==
- Craggs, Florida, United States

== People ==
- Charlie Craggs, British transgender activist and author
- Fred Craggs, New Zealand association football player
- Helen Millar Craggs (1888–1969), British suffragette and pharmacist
- Jack Craggs (1880–?), English footballer
- James Craggs the Elder (1657–1721), English politician
- James Craggs the Younger (1686–1721), English politician, son of James Craggs the Elder
- John Craggs (songwriter) (1849–?), English poet
- John Craggs (footballer) (born 1948), English footballer
- Kenneth Cragg (1913–2012), Anglican bishop and scholar

== See also ==
- The Marvellous Craggs, English acrobatic troupe
- Cragg (disambiguation)
