= Yacht (disambiguation) =

A yacht is a boat and also a sailing class (sailing yacht).

The term Yacht may also refer to:

- Yacht (band), an American band
- Yachts (band), a British band
- Yacht (dice game), a dice game
