= Cacho =

Cacho may refer to:

== Dice Games ==
- Cacho Alalay, a South American dice game popular in Bolivia
- Dudo, a South American dice game popular in Chile, also known as Pico or Perudo

== Geology ==
- Cacho Formation, a geological formation in the Colombian Andes

== People ==
- Cacho (footballer, born 2002), Spanish football winger
- Christian Giménez (footballer, born 1981), Argentine-Mexican former footballer nicknamed Cacho
