= Kismet (dice game) =

1963 dice game

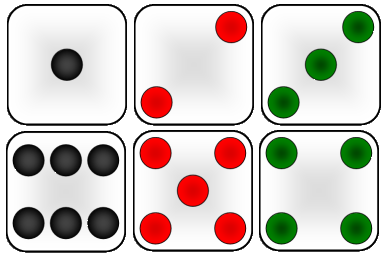
The faces of the dice used in Kismet, with three different colors of pips

Kismet is a commercial dice game introduced in 1964. The game's name is the Turkish word for "fate". E. William DeLaittre holds the trademark on the game, which was originally published by Lakeside Games, and which is currently produced by Endless Games. Marketed as "The Modern Game of Yacht", the game play is similar to Yacht and Yahtzee, with a few variations. A primary distinction is that in Kismet, the sides of the dice have different colored pips.

== Game contents ==
The game consists of five white dice with colored pips ( and have black pips, and have red pips, and and have green pips), a dice cup, a pad of scorecards, and a pencil.

== Game play ==
Players take turns rolling five dice. Each player can take up to three rolls per turn. On the second and third rolls, the player may hold back dice from the previous rolls in order to create better scoring combinations. At the end of the third roll, the player must enter a score into an open field on their scorecard. If the player cannot use their third roll in any scorecard field, they must enter a zero into an open field.

=== Scorecard ===
Each player keeps a running tally of their rolls on a scorecard. The scorecard is laid out in two sections, the Basic Section and the Kismet Section.

==== Basic section ====
The Basic Section of the scorecard plays similarly to Yahtzee's upper section, in that points are scored for the number of pips on the dice displaying the chosen category. There are six categories: Aces (ones), Deuces (twos), Treys (threes); Fours, Fives, and Sixes. Each of these categories is scored by adding the total of dice that match the category. For example, after the third roll, dice displaying may be entered as a score of 12 in the Fours section (the total pips on the dice displaying), 3 in the Treys section (x1), or 6 in the Sixes section (x1), if those categories are still open.

As in Yahtzee, a bonus of 35 points is earned with a minimum of 63 in the Basic Section. Kismet provides two further bonus levels; a score of at least 71 but no more than 77 earns a bonus of 55 points; and 78 or more, a bonus of 75 points.

==== Kismet Section ====
The Kismet Section is scored based on creating dice combinations similar to poker hands. It is in this section that the colored dice come into play, as they determine scoring criteria below:

Category	Description	Score	Example
2 Pair Same Color	Two pairs of numbers having the same color, with any number showing on the fifth die. Any Four-of-a-Kind, same-colored Full House, or Kismet can also be scored under this category.	Sum of all dice	1 5 6
3 of a Kind	Three or more dice having the same number.	Sum of all dice	3 4 6
Straight	All five dice in sequence; the equivalent of a Large Straight in Yahtzee. (This game has no counterpart to the Small Straight.)	30	1 2 3 4 5
Flush	All dice showing the same color.	35	2 5
Full House	Any Three-of-a-Kind and a pair; color is not important.	Sum of all dice + 15	4 6
Full House Same Color	A Full House with all dice the same color.	Sum of all dice + 20	1 6
4 of a Kind	Four or more dice showing the same number.	Sum of all dice + 25	3 5
Yarborough	Any combination. (Kismet's "Chance" category)	Sum of all dice	1 2 4 5 6
Kismet	All five dice showing the same number.	Sum of all dice + 50	2

=== Rolling subsequent Kismets ===
Kismet does not provide for bonus points for multiple five-of-a-kinds. After scoring a Kismet, a subsequent five-of-a-kind can be used as a "joker", which can be scored in any open category in the Kismet Section (except the Straight category), or the appropriate number category in the Basic Section if it has not already been scored. Scoring occurs as the category specifies.

The twist of rolling a second Kismet comes in games where two or more people are playing; in multi-player games, if one player rolls a second Kismet, all other players must take a zero in the first open category (closest to the top on the scoresheet) in the Basic section, or the Kismet section if all Basic section boxes have been filled. The opponents thus lose a turn; the player who rolled the second Kismet rolls again. This applies to subsequent Kismets as well. This is where the name of the game comes into play; with the player rolling multiple Kismets, "it is fate" that they most likely will win.

== See also ==
- Game design
