= Cragg =

Cragg may refer to:

== People ==
- Cragg Hines, (1945–2023), American journalist

=== Surname ===
- Alistair Cragg (born 1980), South African-born Irish long-distance runner
- Charles Cragg (died 1948), Canadian politician
- Dan Cragg (born 1939), American writer
- Edward "Porky" Cragg (1919–1943), American fighter ace of World War II
- Edward Joseph Cragg (1887–1953), civil servant, businessman and political figure in Nova Scotia, Canada
- Ernest T. Cragg (1922–2006), American major general, United States Air Force
- John Cragg (1767–1854), English ironmaster
- J. W. Cragg (1846–1931), English acrobat
- Kenneth Cragg (1913–2012), British Anglican priest and scholar
- Pat Cragg, New Zealand physiologist
- Tony Cragg (born 1949), English artist

== Other uses ==
- 5068 Cragg, main-belt asteroid
- Cragg Vale, a village in Calderdale, West Yorkshire, England

== See also ==
- Crag (disambiguation)
