= Crag (dice game) =

Dice game played with three dice

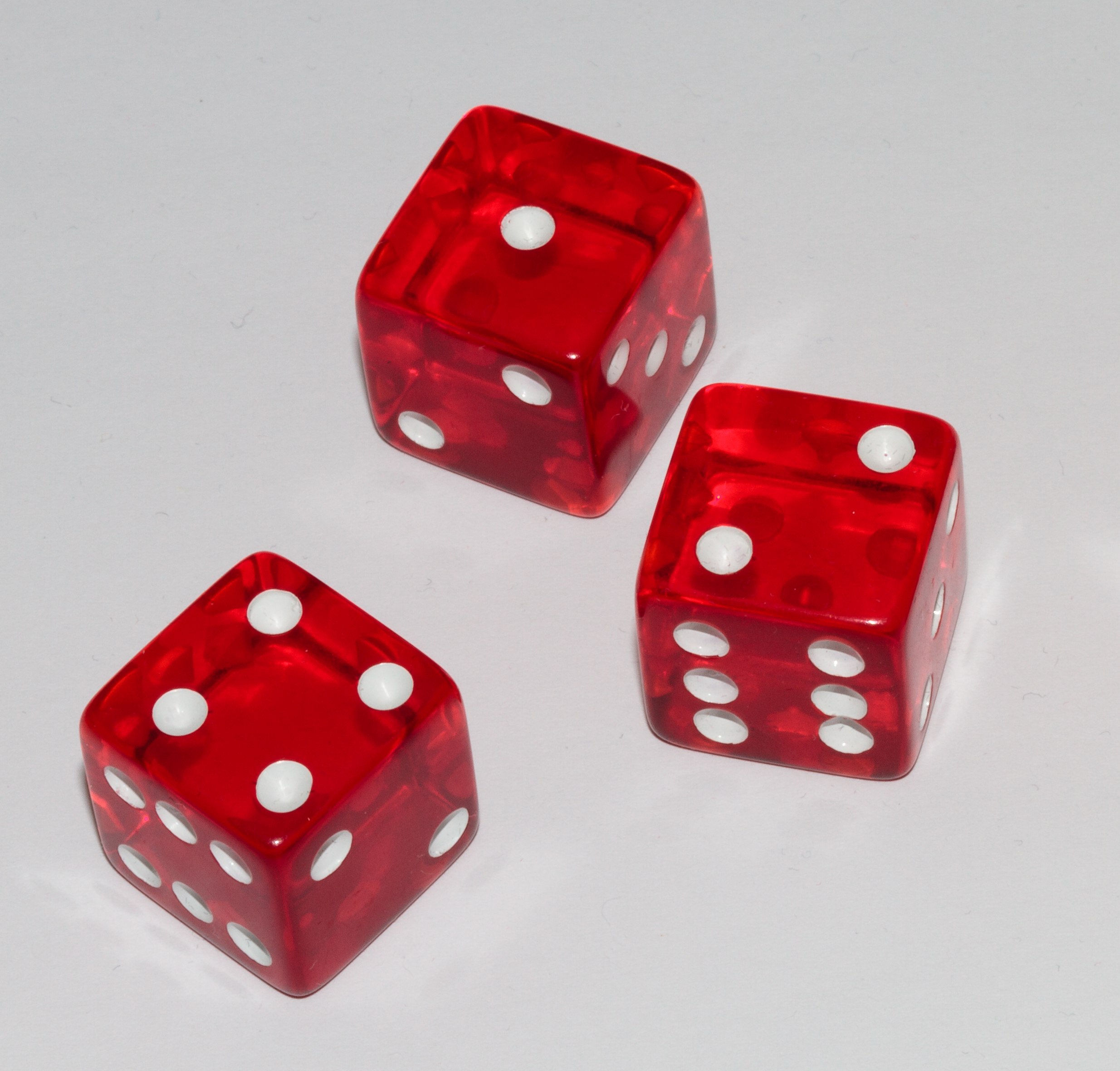
Crag is played with three six-sided dice

Crag is a dice game similar to Yacht, Yahtzee, and Yatzy. It is played with three dice. The game is quicker to play than Yahtzee, and in Clement Wood and Gloria Goddard's 1940 Complete Book of Games, it is described as a game that "shares with Yacht the supremacy among sequence dice-casting games".

== Gameplay ==
Over 13 rounds, players take turns to roll three dice and assign them to certain combinations in a table. After throwing the dice, a player may choose to reroll any number of those dice. This second roll is final, at which point the player chooses which scoring category is to be used for that round. Once a player has used a category, they cannot use it again.

The scoring categories have varying point values, some of which are fixed values and others where the score depends on the value of the dice. The winner is the player who scores most points.

== Scoring ==
The following are the 13 categories and the points scored in those categories:

Category	Description	Score	Example
Crag	Any combination containing a pair and totalling 13	50	⚅⚅⚀ scores 50
Thirteen	Any combination totalling 13	26	⚂⚃⚅ scores 26
Three of a Kind	Three equal dice	25	⚃⚃⚃ scores 25
Low Straight	1-2-3	20	⚀⚁⚂ scores 20
High Straight	4-5-6	20	⚃⚄⚅ scores 20
Odd Straight	1-3-5	20	⚀⚂⚄ scores 20
Even Straight	2-4-6	20	⚁⚃⚅ scores 20
Sixes	Any combination	Sum of sixes	⚅⚅⚅ scores 18
Fives	Any combination	Sum of fives	⚀⚁⚄ scores 5
Fours	Any combination	Sum of fours	⚃⚃⚄ scores 8
Threes	Any combination	Sum of threes	⚂⚂⚂ scores 9
Twos	Any combination	Sum of twos	⚁⚁⚅ scores 4
Ones	Any combination	Sum of ones	⚀⚀⚀ scores 3

If a category is chosen but the dice do not match the requirements of the category the player scores 0 in that category.

The maximum possible score is 244.
