= Pip (counting) =

Easily countable items

Pips are small but easily countable items, such as the dots on dominoes and dice, or the symbols on a playing card that denote its suit and value.

== Playing cards ==
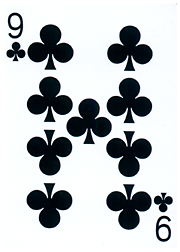
The Nine of Clubs with nine pips and two corner index pips.

In playing cards, pips are small symbols on the front side of the cards that determine the suit of the card and its rank. For example, a standard 52-card deck consists of four suits of thirteen cards each: spades, hearts, clubs, and diamonds. Each suit contains three face cards – the jack, queen, and king. The remaining ten cards are called pip cards and are numbered from one to ten. (The "one" is almost always changed to "ace" and often is the highest card in many games, followed by the face cards.) Each pip card consists of an encoding in the top left-hand corner (and, because the card is also inverted upon itself, the lower right-hand corner) which tells the card-holder the value of the card. In Europe, it is more common to have corner indices on all four corners which lets left-handed players fan their cards more comfortably. The center of the card contains pips representing the suit. The number of pips corresponds with the number of the card, and the arrangement of the pips is generally the same from deck to deck.

Pip cards (originally 'peep') are also known as numerals or numeral cards, number cards, spot cards, or spotters.

In point-trick games where cards often score their value in pips (or equivalent if they are court cards e.g. a King may be worth 13), card points are sometimes referred to as pips.

Many French-suited packs derived from the English pattern contain a variation on the pip style for the Ace of spades, often consisting of an especially large pip or even a representative image, along with information about the deck's manufacturer, originally to display the stamp duty. This is also the case for the Ace of clubs in the Paris pattern and the Ace of diamonds in the Russian pattern. In Germany, the Ace of Hearts was used, or for German-suited playing cards, the deuce of hearts was used for this purpose. For Latin-suited playing cards, the ace of coins was used.

Special Pips for cards displaying stamp duty
English	Paris	Russian	German	Latin
	A of clubs			

Historically German pips are generally different from the pips used in France and England, and the latter dates from at least the fourteenth century CE.

== Dice ==
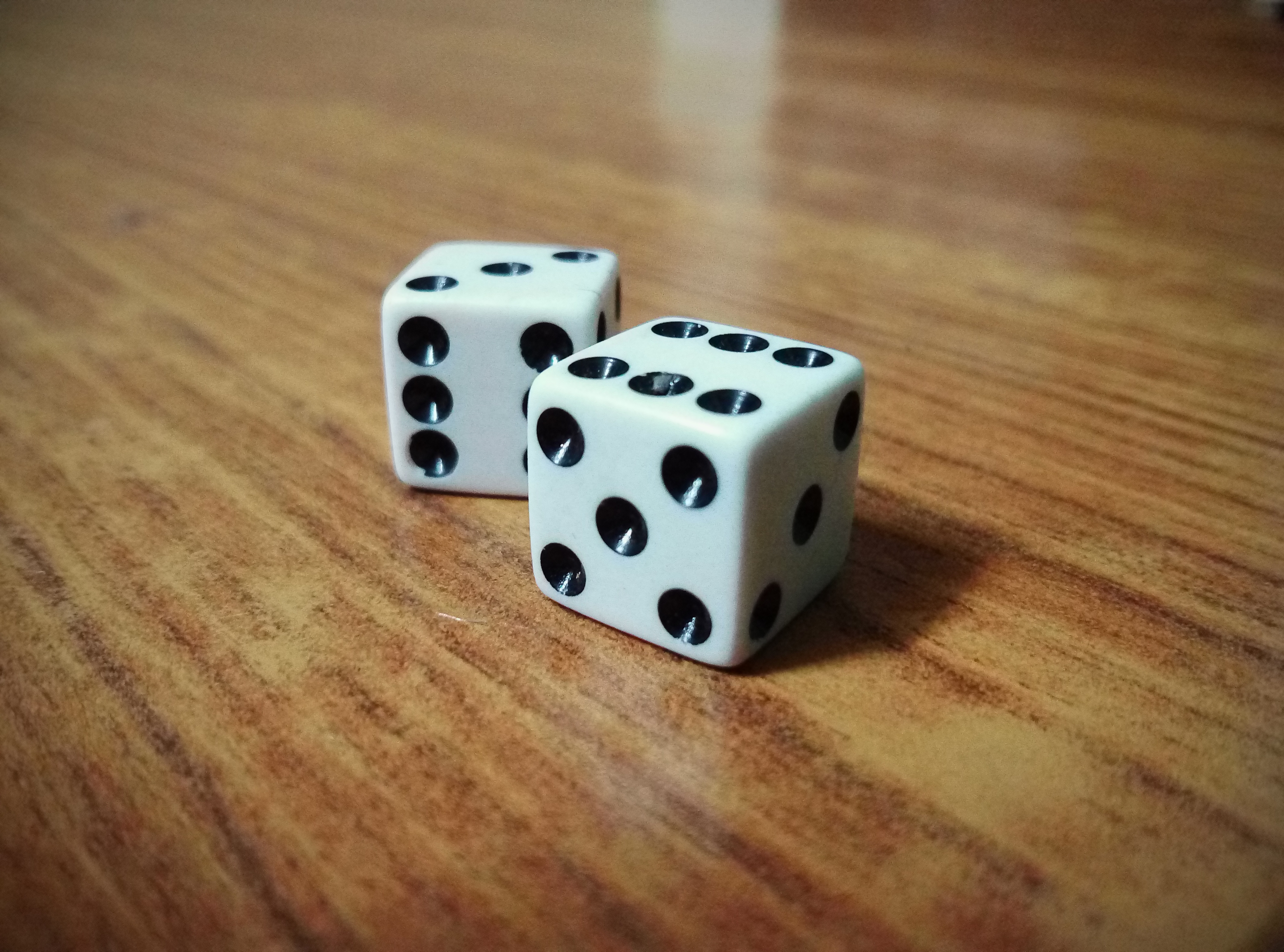
The pips on the top faces of these dice can be quickly counted as totaling nine

On dice, pips are small dots on each face of a die. These pips are typically arranged in patterns denoting the numbers one through n, where n is the number of faces. For the common six-sided die, the sum of the pips on opposing faces traditionally adds up to seven.

Pips are commonly colored black on white or yellow dice, and white on dice of other colors, although colored pips on white/yellow dice are not uncommon; Asian dice often have an enlarged red single pip for the "one" face, while the dice for the 1964 commercial game Kismet feature black pips for 1 and 6, red pips for 2 and 5, and green pips for 3 and 4.

== Dominoes ==
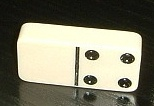
A domino with four pips on one side, and zero on the other

Dominoes use pips that are similar to dice. Each half of a domino tile can have anywhere from no pips all the way up to 18, in practice, depending on the set. In a standard double-six set, tiles range from blank to six pips on each half. Larger sets such as double-nine or double-twelve extend this range and are commonly used to accommodate additional players.

== See also ==
- Counting measure – Mathematical concept
- Approximate number system – Innate ability to detect differences in magnitude without counting
