= Crag, West Virginia =

Unincorporated community in West Virginia, United States

- Unincorporated community
- Location within West Virginia Location within the United States
- Coordinates: 37°54′30″N 80°44′59″W
- Country: United States
- State: West Virginia
- County: Greenbrier
- Elevation: 2,487 ft (758 m)
- Time zone: UTC-5 (Eastern (EST))
  - Summer (DST): UTC-4 (EDT)
- Area codes: 304 & 681
- GNIS feature ID: 1560588

Crag is an unincorporated community in Greenbrier County, West Virginia, United States. Crag is 4 miles (6.4 km) south-southeast of Rainelle.

The community was named for the rocky crags near the town site.
