= Pat Cragg =

New Zealand physiologist and academic administrator

- Other name: Patricia Ann Cragg
- Education: University of Bristol
- Scientific career
- Thesis: Respiration and body weight in the reptilian genus Lacerta: A physiological, anatomical and morphometric study (1976)

Patricia Ann Cragg is a New Zealand physiologist and full professor and former academic administrator at the University of Otago.

== Academic career ==
Cragg graduated from the University of Bristol with a BSc and PhD (1976) titled "Respiration and body weight in the reptilian genus Lacerta: A physiological, anatomical and morphometric study".

Cragg moved to New Zealand to take a position with the University of Otago, filling teaching, research and administrative roles over the years. She retired in May 2018. In April 2019 Cragg returned from retirement to be Acting Deputy Vice-Chancellor (Academic) and in December 2019 she was promoted to full professor with effect from 1 February 2020.

== Selected publications ==
- Daryl O. Schwenke; Takeshi Tokudome; Ichiro Kishimoto; Takeshi Horio; Patricia A. Cragg; Mikiyasu Shirai; Kenji Kangawa (2012). "One dose of ghrelin prevents the acute and sustained increase in cardiac sympathetic tone after myocardial infarction" (PDF). Endocrinology. 153 (5): 2436–2443. doi:10.1210/en.2011-2057. PMID 22434083. Wikidata Q83704765.
- Rosalind F Cook; Carol T Bussey; Kimberley M Mellor; Patricia A Cragg; Regis R Lamberts (2017). "β1 -Adrenoceptor, but not β2 -adrenoceptor, subtype regulates heart rate in type 2 diabetic rats in vivo". Experimental Physiology. 102 (8): 911–923. doi:10.1113/ep086293. PMID 28543947. Wikidata Q48096584.
- Rosalind F. Cook; Carol T. Bussey; Ingrid C. Fomison‐Nurse; Gillian Hughes; Andrew Bahn; Patricia A. Cragg; Regis R. Lamberts (2019). "β_{2}‐Adrenoceptors indirectly support impaired β_{1}‐adrenoceptor responsiveness in the isolated type 2 diabetic rat heart". Experimental Physiology. 104 (6): 808–818. doi:10.1113/ep087437. PMID 30889297. Wikidata Q92479717.
