= Crag, Arizona =

- Populated place
- Location within Arizona Location within the United States
- Coordinates: 33°18′04″N 112°54′08″W
- Country: United States
- State: Arizona
- County: Maricopa
- Elevation: 883 ft (269 m)
- Time zone: UTC-7 (Mountain (MST))
  - Summer (DST): UTC-7 (MST)
- Area code: 928
- FIPS code: 04-17015
- GNIS feature ID: 24391

Crag is a populated place situated in Maricopa County, Arizona, United States. It has an estimated elevation of 883 feet (269 m) above sea level. It is located on the Union Pacific's Phoenix Subdivision.
