= Yacht (dice game) =

Dice game

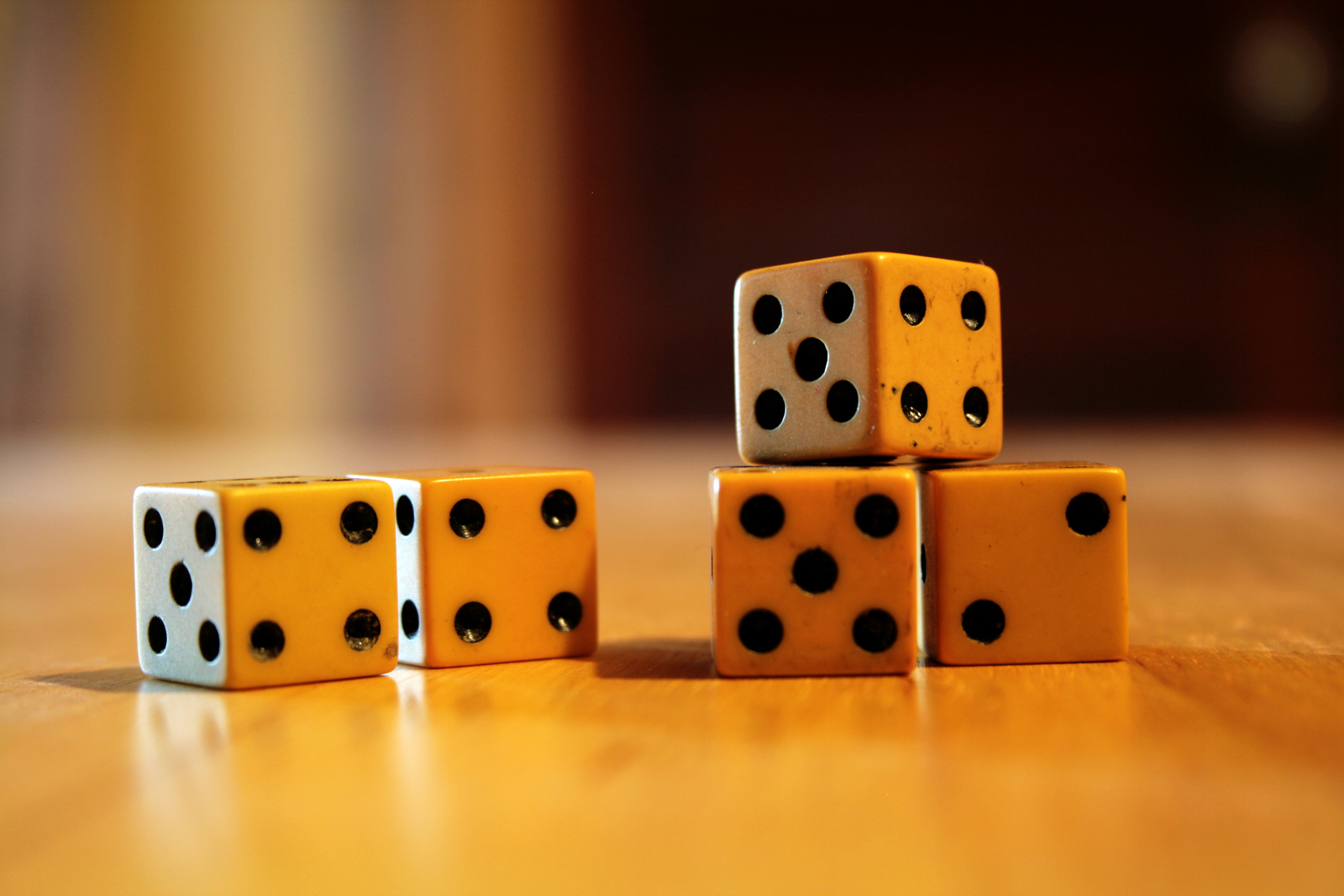
Yacht is played with five six-sided dice

Yacht is a public domain dice game, similar to the Latin American game Generala, the English game of Poker Dice, the Scandinavian Yatzy, and Cheerio. Yacht dates back to at least 1938, and is a contemporary of the similar three-dice game Crag. Yahtzee is a later development, similar to Yacht in both name and content.

The name Yacht is also used for a number of later dice games that include many features of Yahtzee, being closer to Yahtzee than the original Yacht game.

== Gameplay ==
These rules relate to the 1938 version of Yacht. The object of the game is to score points by rolling five dice to make certain combinations. The dice can be rolled up to three times in a turn to try to make these combinations. A game consists of twelve rounds. After each round the player chooses which scoring category is to be used for that round. Once a category has been used in the game, it cannot be used again. The scoring categories have varying point values, some of which are fixed values and others where the score depends on the value of the dice. A Yacht is five-of-a-kind and scores 50 points; the highest of any category. The winner is the player who scores the most points.

== Scoring ==
The following are the 12 categories and the points scored in those categories:

Category	Description	Score	Example
Ones	Any combination	Sum of ones	scores 3
Twos	Any combination	Sum of twos	scores 6
Threes	Any combination	Sum of threes	scores 9
Fours	Any combination	Sum of fours	scores 12
Fives	Any combination	Sum of fives	scores 15
Sixes	Any combination	Sum of sixes	scores 18
Full House	Three equal and a pair	Sum of all dice	scores 19
Four of a Kind	At least four equal dice	Sum of those four	scores 20
Little Straight	1-2-3-4-5	30 (*)	scores 30
Big Straight	2-3-4-5-6	30 (*)	scores 30
Choice	Any combination	Sum of all dice	scores 13
Yacht	Five equal dice	50	scores 50

(*) Score is depending on the rule variant.

If a category is chosen but the dice do not match the requirements of the category the player scores 0 in that category.

A Yacht cannot be scored on Full House, but can be scored on Four of a Kind, although the fifth die is not counted in the score. The scores for the straights vary, but a typical score is 30 for each.

The maximum possible score depends on the scoring rules used, but with the above rules and both straights counting 30, the maximum score is 297.

== Comparison with Yahtzee ==
The rules of Yacht differ from those of Yahtzee in a number of ways:

- It does not have an upper section bonus.
- There is no three-of-a-kind category.
- Both straights are set sequences of five (Big Straight is two-three-four-five-six and Small Straight is one-two-three-four-five).
- There are no Yahtzee bonuses or Joker rule.

There are a number of differences to the category names compared to Yahtzee. Aces is often called Ones, Large Straight is called Big Straight (there is no four-dice "Small Straight" category in Yacht), Yahtzee is called Yacht and Chance is called Choice. The order of the categories on the score sheet can also be different from that used on a Yahtzee score sheet. There is no "upper" or "lower" section scoring, just a "Total" row at the bottom of the score sheet.

Although there are no official rules for Yacht, the scoring of some categories generally differs from that used in Yahtzee. Four of a kind scores the sum of those four dice, not all five dice. Full House scores the sum of the five dice, not a fixed score of 25. The scores for the straights can be different from those used in Yahtzee (40 points in Yahtzee).
