= J. W. Cragg =

- Died: 1931

John Williams Cragg (born John Williams; 27 May 1846 – 24 October 1931), known as Papa Cragg, was a British acrobat who founded a family troupe of acrobats often known as The Marvellous Craggs. They were popular in music hall and variety shows between about 1863 and 1917.

He was born in Manchester, the son of Edward Williams and Mary née Cragg, and initially worked in a printing office. He first appeared on stage in a flying trapeze act with a partner in 1862, joining George Sanger's circus soon afterwards, when they were known as the DeCastro Brothers. Both Cragg and his partner married, and the two couples worked together as a quartet of acrobats around the country's music halls, before the partner left.

Cragg then formed a family troupe with his wife, two sons and a daughter. They toured widely, and became known as "The Marvellous Craggs". The troupe made four trips to Australia, the first in 1873, and also toured New Zealand, India, the United States, and frequently in continental Europe. In the 1870s, Cragg became the manager of a theatre at Leigh, but soon returned to performing. Interviewed in 1898, Cragg stated that most of the acrobatic routines performed by other groups had been initiated by, and copied from, those of his troupe. They were described as "not only the greatest of English acrobats, but... unapproached... by any other performers in the world."

J. W. Cragg retired in 1893. In 1895 he was appointed 'King Rat' in the charitable organisation, the Grand Order of Water Rats. There were seven family members performing in 1898, including Cragg's five sons and one daughter, based in their gymnasium in Kennington Road. His family continued to perform until 1917.

J. W. Cragg died in London in 1931 at the age of 85.
