= Yatzy =

Dice game popular in Scandinavia

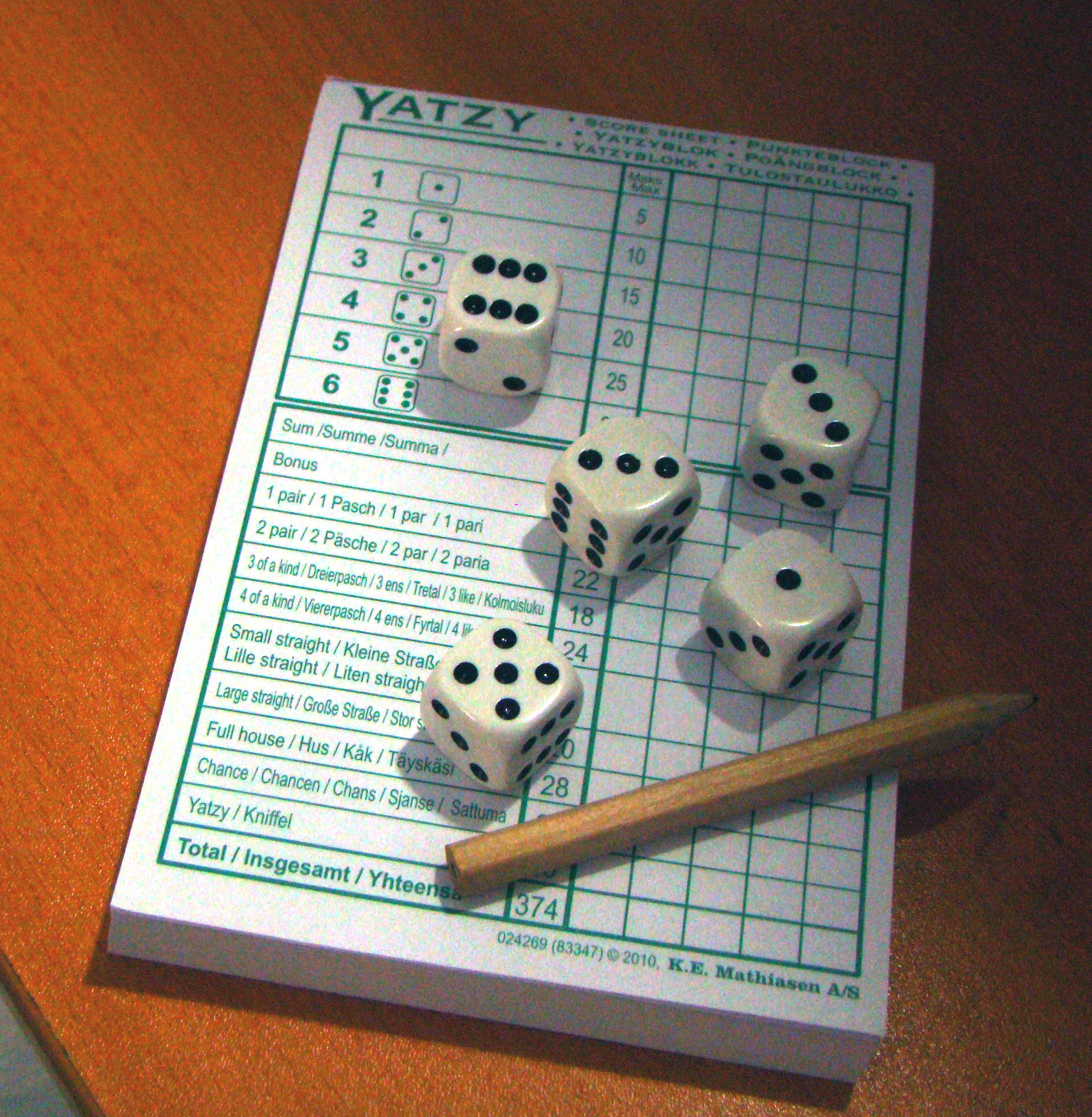
Yatzy Score card with dice

Yatzy is a dice game similar to Yacht and Yahtzee. It is related to the Latin American game Generala and the English game of poker dice. Yatzy is most popular in the Nordic countries.

== Gameplay ==
Yatzy can be played solitaire or by any number of players. Players take turns rolling five dice. After each roll, the player chooses which dice to keep, and which to reroll. A player may reroll some or all of the dice up to two times on a turn. The player must put a score or zero into a score box each turn. The game ends when all score boxes are used. The player with the highest total score wins the game.

The maximum score is 374 (5 on the Ones, 10 on the Twos, 15 on the Threes, 20 on the Fours, 25 on the Fives, 30 on the Sixes, the 50 point bonus, 12 on the One Pair, 22 on the Two Pairs, 18 on the Three of a Kind, 24 on the Four of a Kind, 15 on the Small Straight, 20 on the Large Straight, 28 on the Full House, 30 on the Chance, and 50 on the Yatzy).

== Scoring ==
The following combinations earn points:

Upper Section:

- Ones: The sum of all dice showing one pip.
- Twos: The sum of all dice showing two pips.
- Threes: The sum of all dice showing three pips.
- Fours: The sum of all dice showing four pips.
- Fives: The sum of all dice showing five pips.
- Sixes: The sum of all dice showing six pips.

If a player manages to score at least 63 points (an average of three of each number) in the upper section, they are awarded a bonus of 50 points.

Lower Section:

- One Pair: Two dice showing the same number. Score: Sum of those two dice.
- Two Pairs: Two different pairs of dice. Score: Sum of dice in those two pairs.
- Three of a Kind: Three dice showing the same number. Score: Sum of those three dice.
- Four of a Kind: Four dice with the same number. Score: Sum of those four dice.
- Small Straight: The combination one-two-three-four-five. Score: 15 points (sum of all the dice).
- Large Straight: The combination two-three-four-five-six. Score: 20 points (sum of all the dice).
- Full House: Any set of three combined with a different pair. Score: Sum of all the dice.
- Chance: Any combination of dice. Score: Sum of all the dice.
- Yatzy: All five dice with the same number. Score: 50 points.

=== Scoring strategy ===
Some combinations offer the player a choice as to which category to score them under. E.g., two-two-five-five-five would score 19 in Full House or Chance, 15 in Fives or Three of a Kind, 14 in Two Pairs, 10 in One Pair, 4 in Twos, or 0 in any other category.

== Comparison with Yahtzee ==
Yahtzee rules and scoring categories are somewhat different from Yatzy:

- The bonus for reaching 63 or more points in the Upper Section is 35 points.
- Yahtzee does not have the One Pair and Two Pairs categories.
- The Three of a Kind and Four of a Kind categories are scored using the total of all the dice. For instance, five-five-five-five-six will score 26 points in Three of a Kind and Four of a Kind.
- Full House scores a fixed 25 points.
- Small Straight is any four sequential dice (one-two-three-four, two-three-four-five, or three-four-five-six) and scores a fixed 30 points.
- Large Straight is any five sequential dice (one-two-three-four-five or two-three-four-five-six) and scores a fixed 40 points.
- Yahtzee introduces Yahtzee bonuses and a Joker rule when a player scores a second Yahtzee.

== Variations ==
The two most common variations are Forced Yatzy and Maxi Yatzy.

=== Forced Yatzy ===
In this variant the players must score in exactly the same sequence as listed above, i.e. Ones first, then Twos, and so on. The requirement for upper section bonus is reduced to 42 (two of each number).

=== Maxi Yatzy ===
This variant is played with 6 dice. There are 20 dice combinations. Here the Yatzy-combination is removed and the following combinations are added to the lower section:

- Three Pairs: Three pairs of dice. Score: Sum of all the dice.
- Five of a Kind: Five dice with the same number. Score: Sum of those five dice.
- Full Straight: The combination one-two-three-four-five-six. Score: 21 points (sum of all the dice) or 30 points in some variations.
- Castle (Villa): Two sets of three dice showing the same number. Score: Sum of all the dice.
- Tower: A set of four combined with a set of two. Score: Sum of all the dice.
- Maxi Yatzy: All six dice with the same number. Score: 100 points.

The score required to earn the upper section bonus is increased to 84 points (four of each number). The value of the bonus is also increased to 100 points.

If a player does not use all three rolls during a turn (for example, if a Castle or similar combination is achieved on the first or second roll), the unused roll(s) can be saved and used during future turns.
