= Yahtzee =

Dice game by Milton Bradley

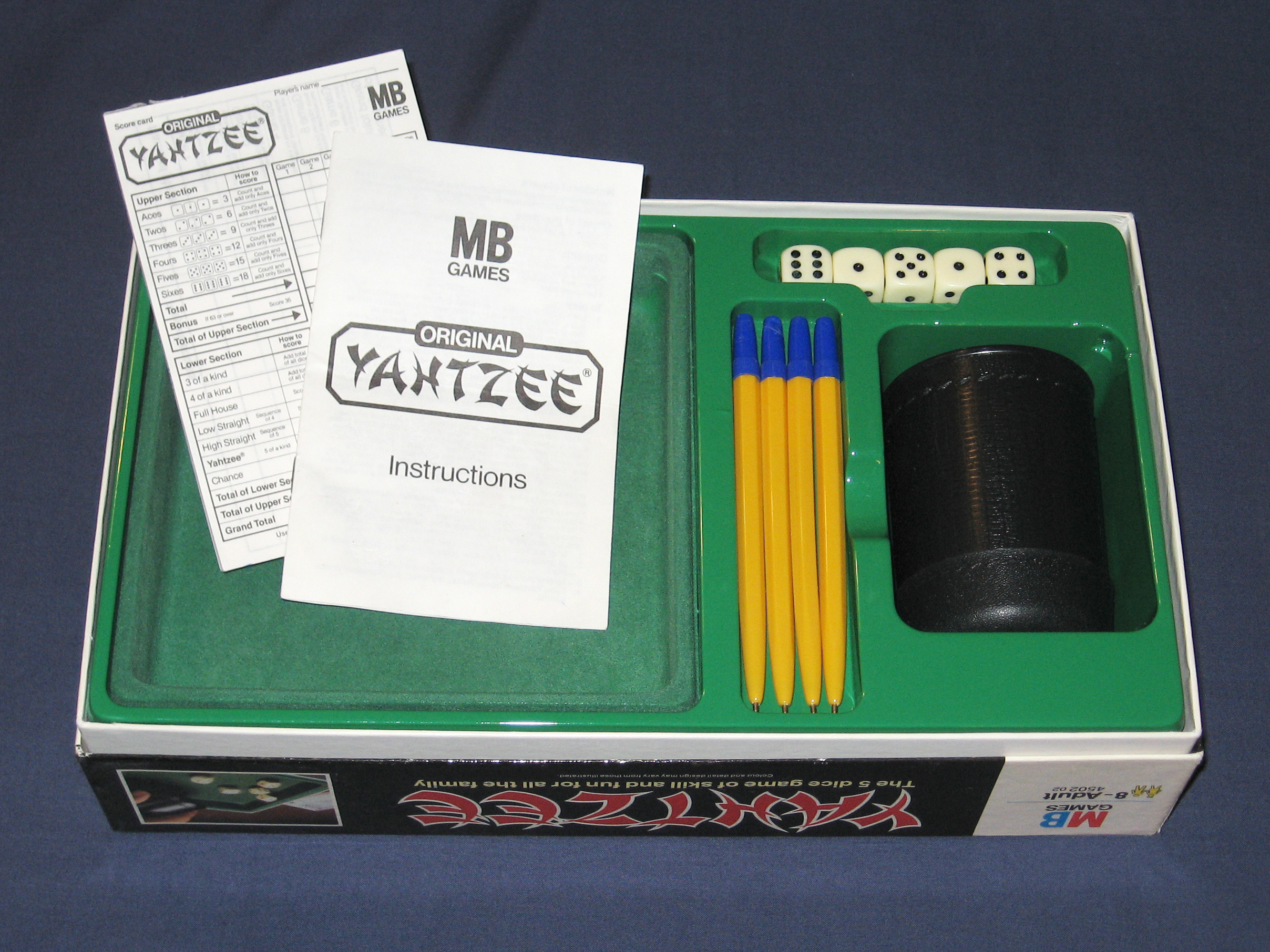
- UK release of the game from the 1980s
- Other names: Cassy
- Designers: Edwin Lowe
- Illustrators: Fiore GmbH; Taavi Oolberg; Peyo; Charles M. Schulz
- Publishers: Milton Bradley (formerly); Hasbro (currently)
- Publication: 1956; 70 years ago
- Years active: 1956 – present
- Players: 2–10
- Playing time: 30 minutes
- Chance: High
- Age range: 8+
- Skills: luck; probability; strategy

Yahtzee is a dice game made by Milton Bradley (a company that has since been acquired and assimilated by Hasbro). It was first marketed under the name of Yahtzee by game entrepreneur Edwin S. Lowe in 1956. The game is a development of earlier dice games such as Poker Dice, Yacht and Generala. It is also similar to Yatzy, which is popular in Scandinavia.

The objective of the game is to score points by rolling five dice to make certain combinations. The dice can be rolled up to three times in a turn to try to make various scoring combinations and dice must remain in the box. A game consists of thirteen rounds. After each round, the player chooses which scoring category is to be used for that round. Once a category has been used in the game, it cannot be used again. The scoring categories have varying point values, some of which are fixed values and others for which the score depends on the value of the dice. A Yahtzee is five-of-a-kind and scores 50 points, the highest of any category. The winner is the player who scores the most points.

Yahtzee was marketed by the E.S. Lowe Company from 1956 until 1973. In 1973, the Milton Bradley Company purchased the E.S. Lowe Company and assumed the rights to produce and sell Yahtzee. During Lowe's ownership, over 40 million Yahtzee games were sold worldwide. According to the current owner, Hasbro, as of 2007, 50 million Yahtzee games are sold each year. A classic edition is currently being marketed by Winning Moves Games USA.

What may be the world’s largest Yahtzee tournament occurs each January in Eureka, California. Hosted by the Rotary Club of Old Town Eureka and the Rotary Club of Southwest Eureka, this annual tournament features over 200 players at 30 tables as a fundraiser for local non-profits.

== History ==
The overall concept of Yahtzee traces its roots to a number of traditional dice games. Among these are the game Generala and the English games of Poker Dice and Cheerio.

The most important predecessor of Yahtzee is the dice game Yacht, which is an English cousin of Generala and dates back to at least 1938. Wood classifies Yacht, and a similar three-dice game called Crag, as sequence dice games. Yahtzee is similar to Yacht in both name and content. Although Yahtzee is clearly derived from Yacht, it differed from it in a number of significant ways:

- It introduced the upper section bonus.
- It included the Three of a Kind category.
- In Yacht both straights are a sequence of five (Big Straight is two-three-four-five-six, and Little Straight is one-two-three-four-five). Yahtzee introduced the sequence of four straight (the Small Straight).
- It introduced Yahtzee bonuses and the Joker rule.
- There were also a number of scoring differences.

The present-day commercial Yahtzee began when toy and game entrepreneur Edwin S. Lowe filed Yahtzee as a trademark with the U.S. Patent Office on April 19, 1956. The first commercial usage of the name Yahtzee was a few weeks earlier on April 3. Lowe classified his product as a Poker Dice Game. Lowe is also responsible for introducing Bingo to the U.S. market.

According to Hasbro, the game was invented by an anonymous Canadian couple, who called it The Yacht Game because they played it on their yacht with their friends. Later they asked Lowe if he would make up some sets to be given as gifts to their friends who enjoyed the game. Lowe perceived the possibility of marketing the game, and acquired the rights to the game from the couple in exchange for 1,000 gift sets. This story is expanded by Lowe in the 1973 book A Toy is Born by Marvin Kaye. According to Lowe, the game did not initially do well commercially, since the rules and appeal were not easily conveyed in an advertisement. Eventually, he had the idea of organizing Yahtzee parties at which people could play the game and thereby gain a first-hand appreciation of it. The idea was successful, and enthusiasts quickly popularized the game through word of mouth.

The E.S. Lowe Company sold Yahtzee from 1956 to 1973. During Lowe's ownership, a number of changes were made to the game's packaging, contents, and appearance. Between 1956 and 1961, the game's advertising slogan was changed from "The Game That Makes You Think While Having Fun" to "The Fun Game That Makes Thinking Fun!"

The game and its contents were copyrighted by Lowe in 1956, 1961, 1967, and 1972. In 1973, Milton Bradley purchased the E.S. Lowe Company and assumed the rights to produce and sell Yahtzee. During Lowe's ownership over 40 million Yahtzee games were sold in America and around the globe. The game has maintained its popularity. According to current owner Hasbro, as of 2007, 50 million Yahtzee games are sold each year.

Over time, the Yahtzee logo has taken several forms. The original version of the logo was used throughout the entire period that the game was produced solely by the Lowe company. After 1973, the logo changed various times. This logo is found on the scorecards and the game box(es).

== Rules ==
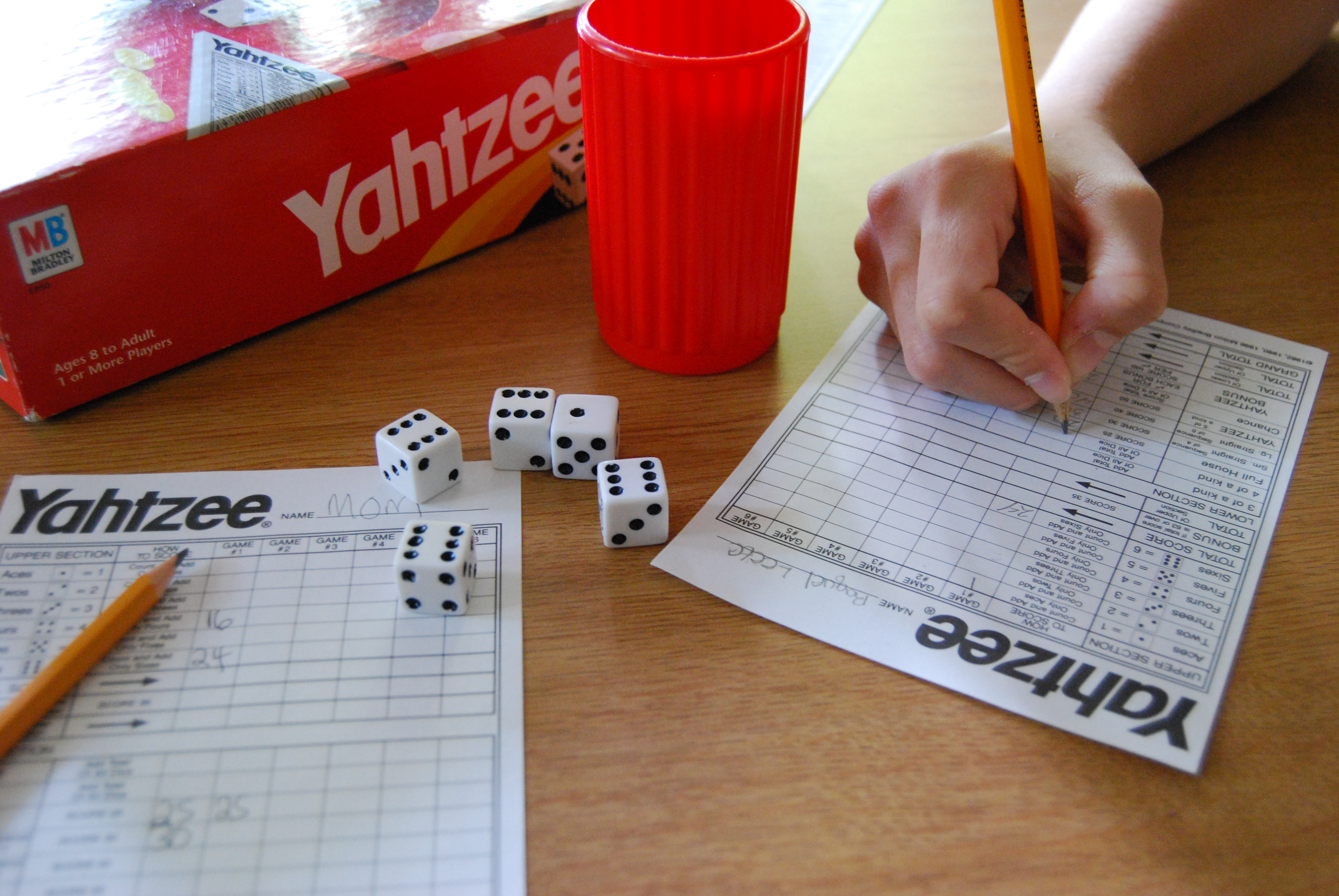
A game of Yahtzee in progress

The game consists of 13 rounds. In each round, a player gets three rolls of the dice, although they can choose to end their turn after one or two rolls. After the first roll the player can save any dice they want and re-roll the other dice. This procedure is repeated after the second roll. The player has complete choice as to which dice to roll. It is possible to re-roll any dice that were or were not rolled before.

The Yahtzee scorecard contains 13 different category boxes. After completing each round, a player must enter a score in one of these category boxes. The score entered in the box depends on how well the five dice match the scoring rule for the category. Once a score has been entered for a category, that category may not be used again by that player in that game. The game is completed after 13 rounds by each player, with each of the 13 boxes filled. Total scores are calculated by summing all thirteen boxes, together with any bonuses. The player with the highest score wins. Gameplay is non-interactive between contestants, making Yahtzee a competitive parallel solitaire game.

Details of the scoring rules for each category are given below. As an example, one of the categories is called Three of a Kind. The scoring rule for this category means that a player only scores if at least three of the five dice are the same value. If a player chooses to score a roll in this category even though they do not have at least three dice of the same value, their score will be 0.

The Yahtzee scorecard contains 13 scoring boxes divided into upper and lower sections.

=== Upper section ===
In the upper section, there are six boxes. The score in each of these boxes is determined by adding the total number of dice matching that box.

Category	Description	Score	Example
Aces	Any combination	The sum of dice with the number 1	scores 3
Twos	Any combination	The sum of dice with the number 2	scores 6
Threes	Any combination	The sum of dice with the number 3	scores 12
Fours	Any combination	The sum of dice with the number 4	scores 8
Fives	Any combination	The sum of dice with the number 5	scores 5
Sixes	Any combination	The sum of dice with the number 6	scores 18

If a player scores a total of 63 or more points in these six boxes, a bonus of 35 is added to the upper section score. Although 63 points corresponds to scoring exactly three-of-a-kind for each of the six boxes, a common way to get the bonus is by scoring four-of-a-kind for some numbers so that fewer of other numbers are needed. A player can earn the bonus even if they score a "0" in an upper section box.

In order to gauge how well a player is doing in the upper section, they often refer to being "up" or "down" compared to the average of three required for each box. So that if a player scores four "sixes" they will be "6 up"; while if they then score just two "fours" they will then be only "2 up". Similarly, if a player starts with two "twos" they will be "2 down".

=== Lower section ===
The lower section contains a number of poker-themed categories with specific point values:

Category	Description	Score	Example
Chance	Any combination	Sum of all dice	scores 14
Three of a Kind	At least three dice the same	Sum of all dice	scores 17
Four of a Kind	At least four dice the same	Sum of all dice	scores 24
Full House	Three of one number and two of another	25	scores 25
Small Straight	Four sequential dice (1-2-3-4, 2-3-4-5, or 3-4-5-6)	30	scores 30
Large Straight	Five sequential dice (1-2-3-4-5 or 2-3-4-5-6)	40	scores 40
Yahtzee	All five dice the same	50	scores 50

Some players count five of the same number (called a "Yahtzee") as being a valid Full House. However, the official rule is that a Full House is "three of one number and two of another". Small Straight and Large Straight are sometimes called Low Straight and High Straight (or simply Low and High), Short Straight and Long Straight, or Little Straight and Big Straight.

If a category is chosen but the dice do not match the requirements of the category the player scores 0 in that category. Some combinations offer the player a choice as to which category to score them under; e.g., a full house could be scored in the Full House, the Three of a Kind, or the Chance categories. The Chance category is often used for a turn that will not score well in any other category.

=== Yahtzee bonuses and Joker rules ===
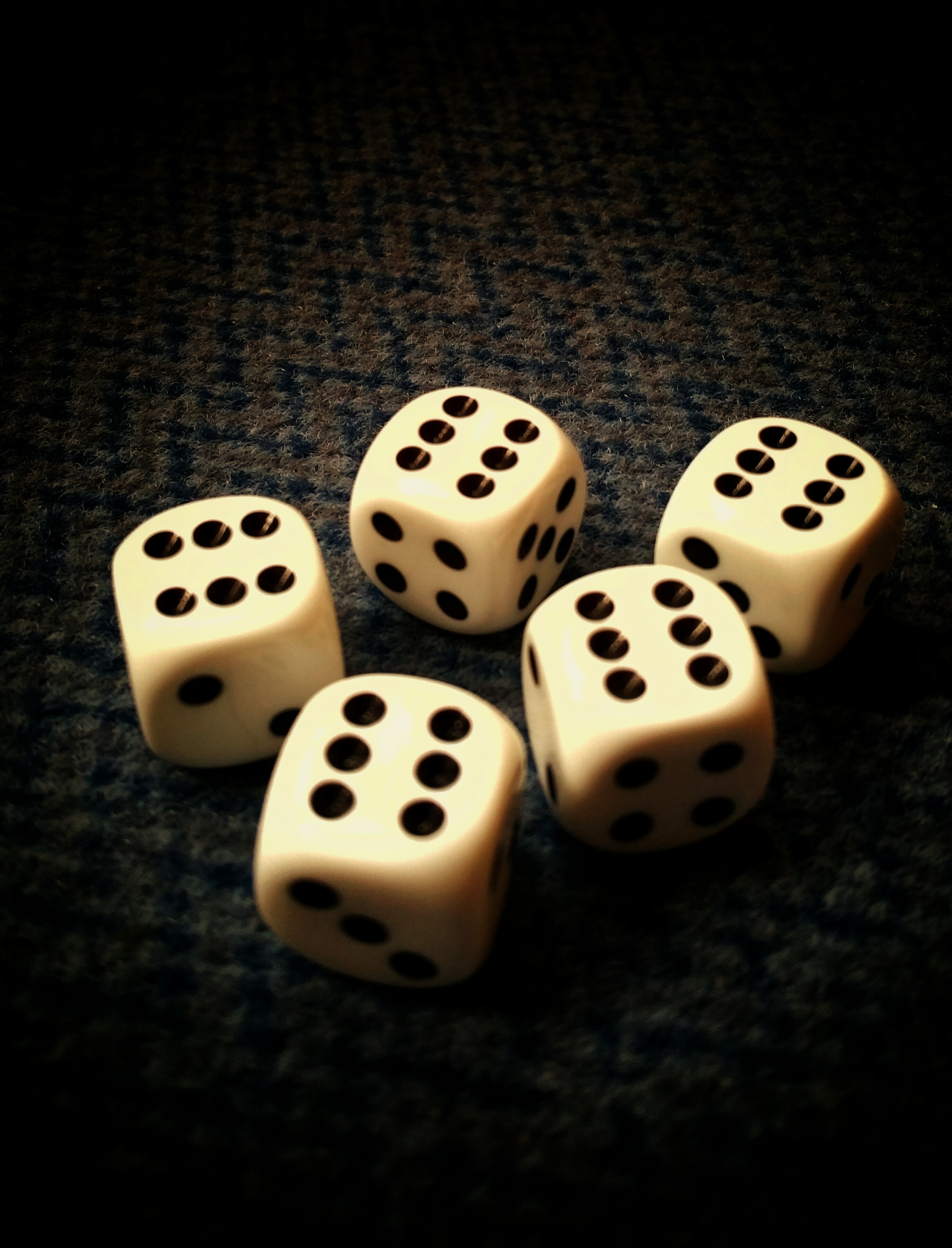

Although Yahtzee is a commercial game with its own components, the game can also be played with just five dice and a pencil and paper.

A Yahtzee occurs when all five dice are the same. If the player throws a Yahtzee and has already filled the Yahtzee box with a score of 50, they score a Yahtzee bonus and get an extra 100 points. However, if they throw a Yahtzee and have filled the Yahtzee category with a score of 0, they do not get a Yahtzee bonus.

In either case they then select a category, as usual. Scoring is the same as normal except that, if the Upper Section box corresponding to the Yahtzee has been used, the Full House, Small Straight and Large Straight categories can be used to score 25, 30 or 40 (respectively) even though the dice do not meet the normal requirement for those categories. In this case, the Yahtzee is said to act as a "Joker".

There are two alternative versions of the Joker rule used.

==== Forced Joker rule ====
In the official rules the player must act in the following way:

- If the corresponding Upper Section box is unused then that category must be used.
- If the corresponding Upper Section box has been used already, a Lower Section box must be used. The Yahtzee acts as a Joker so that the Full House, Small Straight and Large Straight categories can be used to score 25, 30 or 40 (respectively).
- If the corresponding Upper Section box and all Lower Section boxes have been used, an unused Upper Section box must be used, scoring 0.

==== Free choice Joker rule ====
In the simpler, alternative version of the Joker rule, the player retains the free choice as to which category to use, but the Yahtzee can only be used as a Joker if the corresponding Upper Section box has been used. If the corresponding Upper Section box is unused the Yahtzee would score 0 if the Full House, Small Straight or Large Straight categories were chosen.

==== Original Joker rule ====
The original game rules released in 1956 contain a difference from the above rules. The booklet stated that additional Yahtzees must be used as Jokers in the Lower Section and did not allow for their use in the Upper Section. This rule was changed when the game was re-copyrighted in 1961.

The winner is the player with the highest total. The rules do not specify what happens in the event of a tie.

== Maximum score ==
The highest possible score is 1,575 and involves throwing 13 Yahtzees, scoring 12 Yahtzee bonuses of 100 points each, as well as 375 in the other categories. The 375 is achieved by scoring five ones (5), five twos (10), five threes (15), five fours (20), five fives (25), five sixes (30), the Upper Section bonus (35), five sixes scored as Three of a Kind (30), five sixes scored as a Four of a Kind (30), the Full House (25), the Small Straight (30), the Large Straight (40), Yahtzee (50), and five sixes scored as Chance (30). The score of 1,575 requires using the "Joker" rules for the Full House, Small Straight, and Large Straight categories. The highest possible score without using the "Joker" rules for the Full House, Small Straight, and Large Straight categories is 1,480. The highest possible score naturally rolling all the appropriate combinations is 1,275 and involves throwing 10 Yahtzees, a Full House, a Small Straight, and a Large Straight, scoring 9 Yahtzee bonuses of 100 points each.

The highest possible score without a Yahtzee bonus is 351, which is achieved with scoring a five-of-a-kind as a Yahtzee (50), 84 in the Upper Section (four-of-a-kind in each category), and 29 in each of Three of a Kind, Four of a Kind, and Chance. The highest possible score without rolling a five-of-a-kind is 301.

== Minimum score ==
The lowest possible score is 5, which is achieved by scoring five ones (5) as Chance and scoring 0 points in every other category. The lowest possible score without rolling a five-of-a-kind is 6.

The lowest possible score without scoring a 0 in any category is 184, which is achieved with scoring the Full House (25), the Small Straight (30), the Large Straight (40), the Yahtzee (50), 21 in the Upper Section (one of each in each category), and 6 in each of Three of a Kind, Four of a Kind, and Chance.

== Commercial versions ==
=== Deluxe and collector editions ===
Deluxe edition games have been sold alongside the regular issue games since the early 1960s. They all contain components that are more luxurious than standard game parts. In recent years, a number of collector issue Yahtzee games have been sold as well. Some of these collector issues have dice that replace the pips with certain symbols connected to a theme, but still correspond to the numbers one to six.

=== Travel Yahtzee ===
Since the 1970s, Travel Yahtzee has been sold in various forms as part of Milton Bradley's line of travel games.

- In the past, the travel form of Yahtzee was composed of the five dice contained in a special apparatus. "Rolling" the dice is initiated by turning the apparatus over, running it on one hand and turning it upright to see the faces of the dice. Dice to be saved for the next roll are locked by snapping the reverse of the apparatus.
- Currently, a zip-up cloth deluxe folio edition is sold. It consists of the set of dice, the cup, the scorecards and a tray for the dice to roll on, which includes a holder for the dice to be saved for the next roll. The cup has an oblong lip for easy storage.
- In addition to the game folio, Hasbro also released Yahtzee to Go. It comes with a dice cup that stores the dice and contents. This is similar to the original Travel Yahtzee only without the apparatus. This is sold in tandem with the game folio.
- There also exists a red circular travel edition, which includes the dice and scorecards as well as a collapsible cup and detachable dice holder. The bottom half of the case acts as a dice tray. This one uses a different logo from the standard one (the name of the game in uppercase with an exclamation point in front of a green oval) and it is sold outside the United States.
- There are also miniature versions of the game sold in sets contained either in cups that act as keychains (by the company Basic Fun) or in specially shaped pens (by the company Stylus).

=== Electronic versions ===
Various Yahtzee console games have been sold over the years including an early version on the TI-99/4A computer as well as a 1978 version introduced on the Apple II computer. In 1996, the game was first released to PC and Mac users by Atari. The Ultimate Yahtzee CD-ROM game contained standard Yahtzee as well as other varieties. Later, GameHouse also released an authorized special version of the game for Windows users. It was re-released by Hasbro Interactive in 2001 with 700 free hours of AOL.

There are also several electronic versions of the game such as a handheld LCD version, and a cell phone version called Yahtzee Deluxe, which feature the original rules along with Duplicate and Rainbow modes, as well as independently produced versions for the Palm OS and Pocket PC and several cellphone models. The version for the Nintendo Game Boy was licensed from Hasbro and was produced by DSI Games and Black Lantern Studios Inc. It was sold in a three pack that included Life, Pay Day, and Yahtzee. The game has also been released for the iPod, iPod Touch and the iPhone, to be purchased through the iTunes Store, as well as Google Play. Both the iOS app and the Android App are published by Scopely. Yahtzee is available on the Xbox 360 in the Family Game Night game by Hasbro. Pogo.com released a version in 2009, and the game is also available on the Pogo Facebook site as well.

=== Related games ===
A number of related games under the Yahtzee brand have been produced. They all commonly use dice as the primary tool for gameplay, but all differ generally. The first was Triple Yahtzee, developed in 1972. The game has inspired two short-lived television game shows: 1975's Spin-Off on CBS and 1988's syndicated Yahtzee.

== Digital versions ==
There are a large number of versions of Yahtzee which can be played online or are available to download.

- "Open Yahtzee" is a cross-platform open-source (free) version of Yahtzee for one player.
- "YachtC" is a commercially available free app on the Google Play Store. It has three variations: The traditional version, a "7-sided" dice version called "Lucky7", and a "TriColor" version similar to Kismet.
- "Gidd.io" is a free multiplayer platform where Yahtzee can be played online with up to 20 players.
- Yahtzee is one of the games playable on Board Game Arena.

== Similar games ==
There are a large number of related games. Yatzy is one of the most popular. Yatzy rules and scoring categories are somewhat different from Yahtzee:

- The bonus for reaching 63 or more points in the Upper Section is normally 50 points.
- There are two extra boxes for the One Pair and Two Pairs categories. These score the total of the pair(s) involved. For instance, five-five-four-four-one will score 10 points in the One Pair box and 18 in the Two Pairs box. In the Two Pairs category, the pairs must be different.
- The Three of a Kind and Four of a Kind categories are scored using the total of the needed number of same-faced dice. For instance, five-five-five-five-six will score 20 points in Four of a Kind and 15 points in Three of a Kind. This scoring rule is the same as the Four of a Kind scoring used in Yacht.
- Full House scores the total of all dice, as in Yacht.
- Small Straight and Large Straight have the same definitions as in Yacht. A Small Straight is one-two-three-four-five and scores 15 points (the total of the dice faces); the Large Straight is two-three-four-five-six and scores 20 points (again, the combined value of the dice).
- There are no Yahtzee bonuses or Joker rule. Yahtzees can be scored in other categories under the normal scoring rules. For example, a Yahtzee of sixes will score 12 in the One Pair box, 18 in Three of a Kind, 24 in Four of a Kind, 30 in Sixes or Chance and 0 in Two Pairs, Full House, Small Straight and Large Straight boxes.

Other related games include:

- Balut is the name of a Danish dice game played by expatriates in many countries all over the world. The name of the game is taken from balut eggs.
- Kismet has dice with multiple-colored pips. Both numbers and colors are taken into account when scoring.
- Yamb has several (usually four) columns filled with special restrictions and MINIMAX categories with the bigger score if the higher is difference between min and max.

== Mathematical aspects of Yahtzee ==
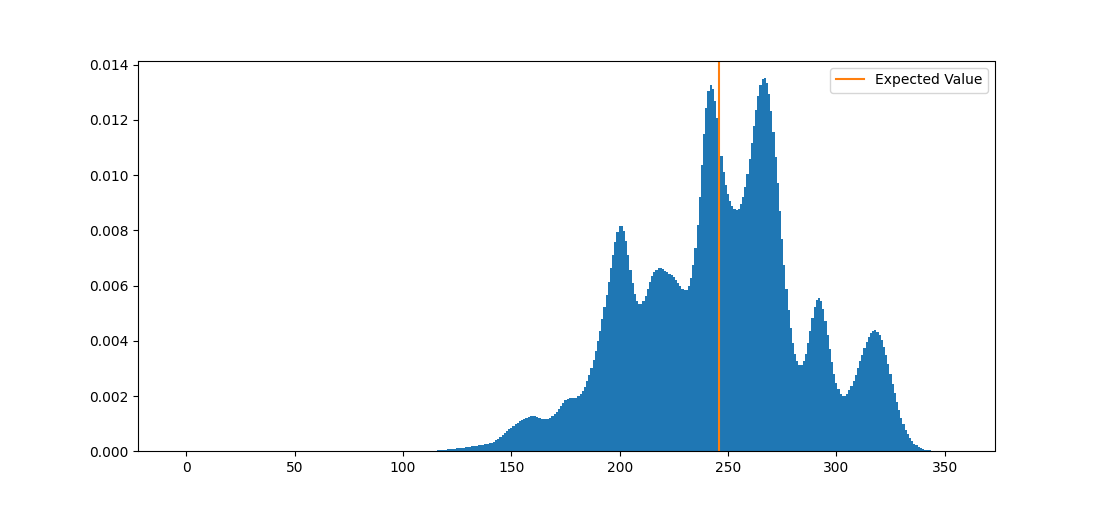
Distribution of points and expected value for a game of Yahtzee, when playing without Yahtzee bonus

The mathematics behind the game Yahtzee (and variants) has been studied extensively. It is a popular source of exercises for students of mathematics and computer science. In 2003, the strategy for maximizing one's score was solved computationally by Phil Woodward by exhaustively evaluating all possible decisions. Optimal play gives an expectation score of 255.
