= Generala =

Latin American dice game

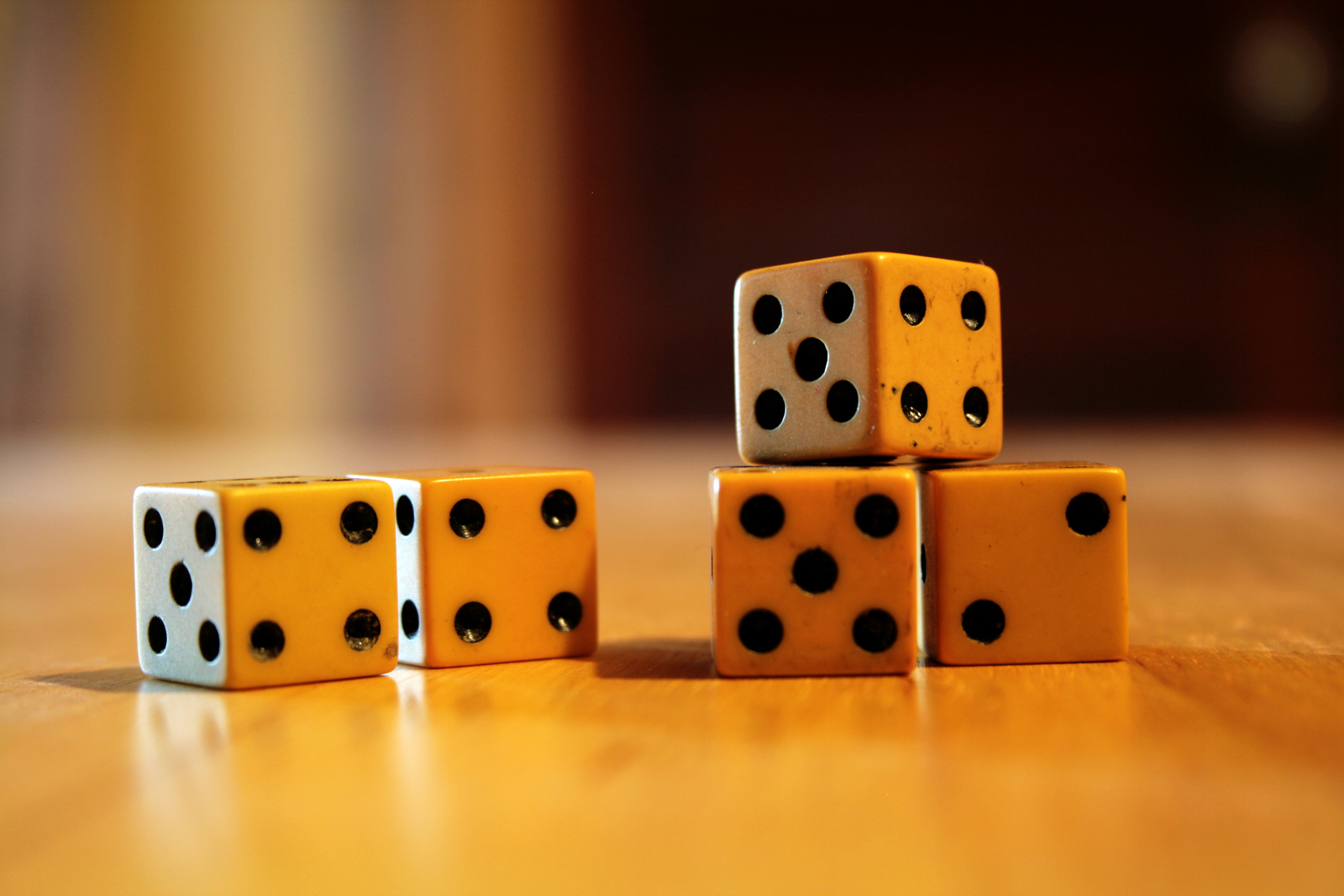
Generala is played with five dice

Generala is a dice game similar to the English game of poker dice, the German game Kniffel, and the Polish game Jacy-Tacy (yahtzee-tahtzee). The American variant of Generala, Yahtzee, is the most popular variant. Although it is sometimes played in Europe and the United States, Generala is most popular in Ibero-America.

== Rules ==
Generala is a game played by two or more players. Players take turns rolling five dice. After each roll, the player chooses which dice (if any) to keep, and which to reroll. A player may reroll some or all of the dice up to two times on a turn, making a maximum of three rolls each turn.

=== Scoring ===
The following combinations earn points:

- Ones, Twos, Threes, Fours, Fives or Sixes. A player may add the numbers on any combination of dice showing the same number. For example, a combination of four, four, four, two, and six, would score 4 + 4 + 4 = 12 points in Fours or 2 points in Twos, or even 6 points in Sixes. Once a player has taken points on a specific combination, they may not take points for that combination again during the game.
- Straight, 20 points. A straight is a combination of five consecutive numbers (a combination of one, two, three, four, and five, or a combination of two, three, four, five, and six). In some variations of the rules, a Straight may "wrap around", so a combination of three, four, five, six, and one, a combination of four, five, six, one, and two, a combination of five, six, one, two, and three, and a combination of six, one, two, three, and four, are also valid straights. Another variation allows a one to replace a two in a Straight, e.g. a combination of one, one, three, four, five or a combination of one, three, four, five, and six.
- Full house, 30 points. Any set of three combined with a set of two, e.g., a combination of five, five, five, three, and three.
- Four of a kind, 40 points. Four dice with the same number, e.g., a combination of two, two, two, two, and six.
- Generala, 50 or 60 points. All five dice showing the same number. If a player achieves a Generala on the first roll of a turn, the player immediately wins the game.
- Double Generala (optional), 100 or 120 points. All five dice showing the same number for the second time in a game. A first-roll Double Generala is not an automatic game-winner.

A player may choose in which qualifying category to score a roll. For example, one need not enter a combination of three, three, three, three, three in Generala – it may also go in Threes or Four of a kind.

If a player achieves a Straight, Full House, or Four of a Kind on the first roll of a given turn, it is worth 5 or 10 extra points.

A player who fails to make any valid score, or chooses not to take any other score, may scratch (eliminate) a category, such as Generala or Twos. If a player scratches a category, that player cannot score on that category for the rest of the game. Specifically, if a player scratches Generala and subsequently rolls Generala on the first roll of a turn, it may not be used as an automatic win.

=== Winning ===
The player who finishes the game with the most points wins the game, unless a player has achieved a Generala on the first roll of a turn. In that case, the lucky player instantly wins the game (an automatic win).

== Variants ==
=== Goldene Fünfzig ===
Goldene Fünfzig (Golden 50) is a German dice game whose mechanics are very similar to Generala but with modified scoring, and the addition of "spare" rolls which can be saved and played later (each spare is known as a Gut). Rolling 5-of-a-kind scores the maximum "golden" score of 50, hence the name.

The game is played with five standard dice, and consists of 10 rounds, with (up to) three rolls of the dice per player per round. As in Generala, the player chooses which dice (if any) to keep, and which to reroll. At each round, the player must mark a score against one of the 10 categories, or "strike" (i.e. scratch or eliminate) a category.

==== Scoring ====
The 10 scoring categories are as follows. Each category must be used once per game per player, or struck off (zero score).

- Ones, Twos, Threes, Fours, Fives or Sixes. These score exactly as described above for Generala. So three twos would score 3 x 2 = 6.
- Low Straight: 15 points. 1, 2, 3, 4, 5
- High Straight: 25 points. 2, 3, 4, 5, 6
- Full House: 30 points. 3-of-a-kind and 2-of-a-kind.
- Goldene Fünfzig: 50 points. 5-of-a-kind

===== Spare (Gut) Rolls =====
If a player makes a straight, full house, or goldene fünfzig in fewer than three rolls, the "spare" rolls can be saved by the player and used later as extra rolls. So if the player scores in two rolls, then one spare roll is saved. If a player scores in one roll, then two spares are saved. A spare roll is known as a Gut (German for "good") and is marked in a separate row below the scoring categories, and crossed out when used. There is no limit on the number of Gut rolls that can be saved in a game, or used in a single round, but each Gut can only be used once. Left over Gut rolls at the end of the game do not add to the total score.

==== Winning ====
The winner is the player with the highest total score after the 10 rounds.
