= Poker dice =

Type of die

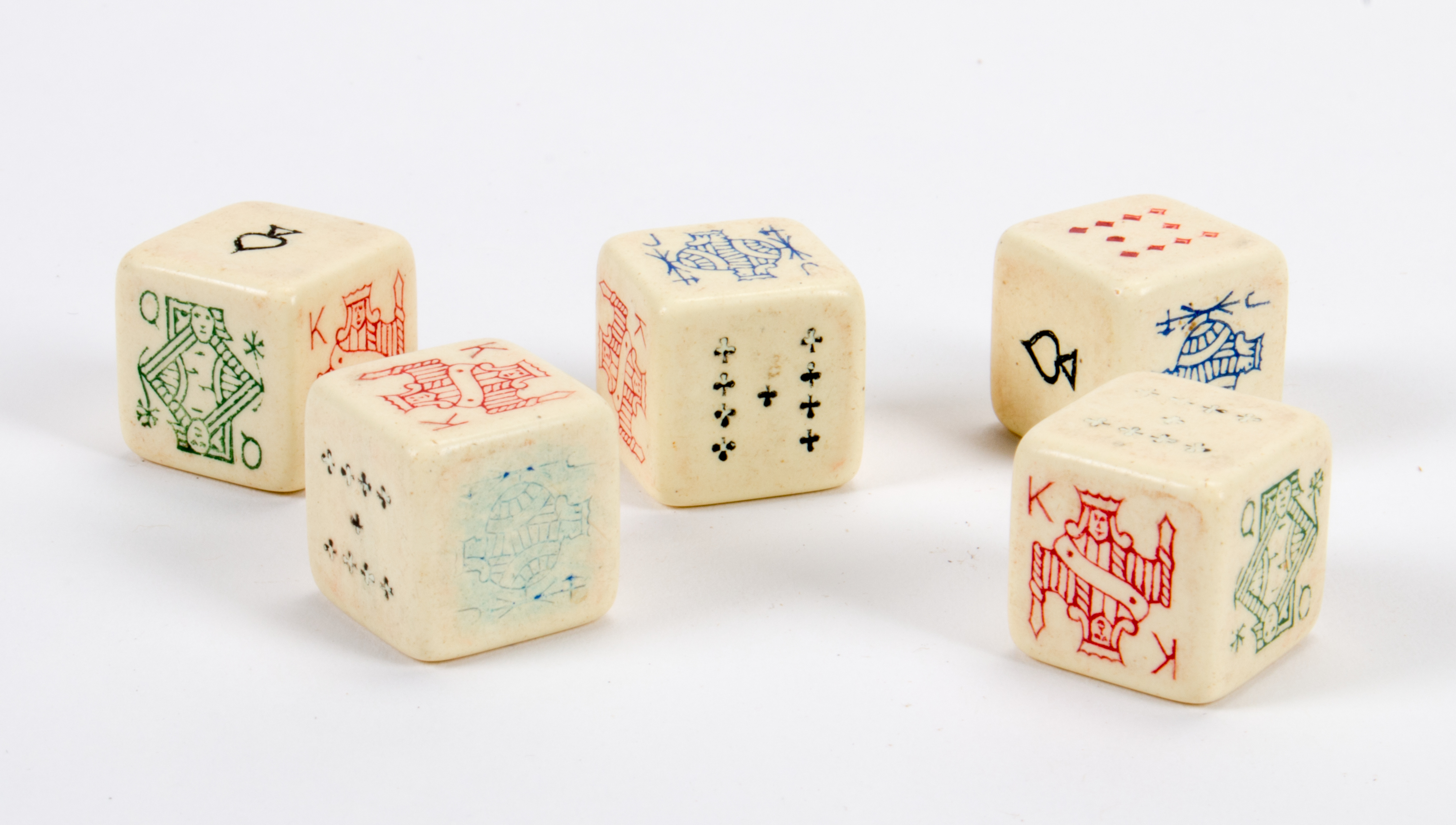
A set of poker dice owned by a member of the Royal Indian Army Service Corps during the Second World War

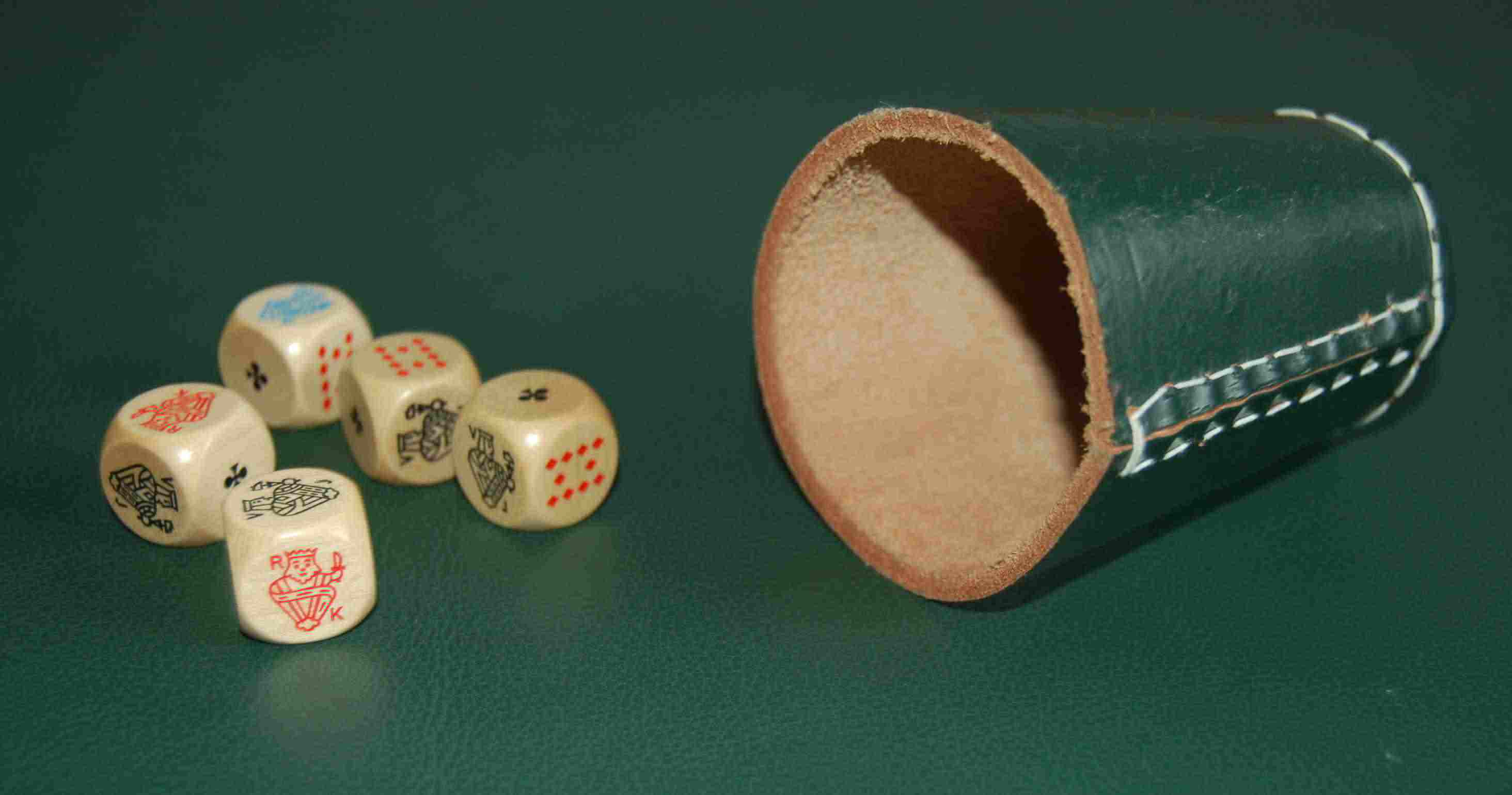
A set of poker dice and a dice cup

Poker dice are dice which, instead of having number pips, have representations of playing cards upon them. Poker dice have six sides, one each of an Ace, King, Queen, Jack, 10, and 9, and are used to form a poker hand.

== Equipment ==
Each variety of poker dice varies slightly in regard to suits, though the ace of spades is almost universally represented. 9♣ and 10♦ are frequently found, while face cards are traditionally represented not by suit, but instead by color: red for kings, green for queens and blue for jacks. Manufacturers have not standardized the colors of the face sides. Due to the lack of suits on the dice, neither a "flush" nor a "straight flush" is possible. The game also may be played with ordinary dice. In this case, the side is high, representing the ace, followed by (K), (Q), (J), (10), and (9). On mutual agreement, players may designate certain faces as wild.

== As a game ==
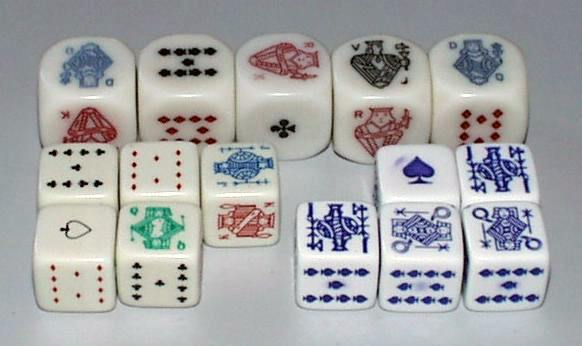
Three sets of poker dice

The classic poker dice game is played with five six-sided dice and two or more players, but typically no more than five. Each player has a total of three rolls and the ability to hold dice in between rolls. After the three rolls, the best hand wins. In some variations, only two rolls are allowed, and in others, the number of dice that may be re-rolled is limited to three. If the first to roll uses less than three rolls, generally that limit applies to subsequent players.

Ties are broken by the dice used in the combination, then by the dice not counted in the combination. For example, suppose three players each have four of a kind. They would rank as follows:

1. A-A-A-A-9 (Four Aces, Ace being higher than King)
2. K-K-K-K-J (Four Kings, Jack being higher than 10)
3. K-K-K-K-10 (Four Kings, but the non-counted die (10) is lower than Jack)

Alternatively, and especially when the five dice are shared amongst the players, the dice not used in the combination can be disregarded, speeding up the game, although there could be more ties.

=== Straights, flushes, and busts ===
Because there are six faces on each die and five dice, there are six distinct rolls in which all five dice have different values:

- [10 J Q K A] ("high straight", missing 9)
- [9 J Q K A] ("bust", missing 10)
- [9 10 Q K A] ("bust", missing J)
- [9 10 J K A] ("bust", missing Q)
- [9 10 J Q A] ("bust", missing K)
- [9 10 J Q K] ("low straight", missing A)

Each of these sequences has an exact probability of 120/7776.

In older variations of the game, straights are counted as busts. There are only two possible straights with Poker Dice, namely:

1. Low straight: with King as the high card, [9 10 J Q K]
2. High straight: with Ace as the high card, [10 J Q K A]

The combined probability of rolling either straight is 240/7776. This means a Straight is less probable than a Full House (300/7776), so, if counted, it should rank above a Full House, though tradition usually ranks it below Full House, as in card poker.

In some rules, only the low straight to a King [9 10 J Q K] is called a Straight, while the high straight to an Ace [10 J Q K A] is called (incorrectly) a Flush. Under these rules, the Straight (low straight) beats a Full House (unlike in card poker, but correctly reflecting its probability) but does not beat a Four of a Kind (incorrectly reflecting its lower probability). A Flush (high straight) beats a Four of a Kind (unlike in card poker, but correctly reflecting its lower probability).

Alternatively, a straight could be ranked between four and five of a kind, or either of the four bust hands could be called a flush, ranking between a full house and a straight.

== Probabilities ==
There are 6^{5} = 7,776 potential combinations when rolling five six-sided dice. The poker dice hand rankings and the corresponding probabilities of rolling that hand are as follows:

Poker dice hands (Note: Sorted from highest rank to lowest)
Hand	Probability (Note: The stated probability is computed as a single roll of all five dice and does not account for re-rolls.)			Wagering		Examples	
Hand	Exact	Percentage	1 in ...	Pays	House edge	Examples	
Five of a kind	6 / 7776	0.08%	1296	500 to 1	61.42%	J J J J J	4
Four of a kind	150 / 7776	1.93%	51.8	40 to 1	22.84%	10 10 10 10 A	3 1
Full house	300 / 7776	3.86%	25.9	20 to 1	22.84%	K K K 9 9	6 2
Straight (Note: Two straights are possible; the high straight [A K Q J 10] outranks the low straight [K Q J 10 9].)	240 / 7776	3.09%	32.4	—N/a (Note: In casino / banking variations, straights and busts are counted together and have an exact probability of 720/7776; with a pay out at 9 to 1, the house edge is 16.67%.)		A K Q J 10	1 6 5 4 3
Three of a kind	1200 / 7776	15.43%	6.5	5 to 1	22.84%	9 9 9 K J	2 6 4
Two pair	1800 / 7776	23.15%	4.3	3 to 1	30.56%	Q Q 9 9 A	5 2 1
One pair	3600 / 7776	46.3%	2.2	1 to 1	53.7%	10 10 K Q 9	3 6 5 2
Bust (high card; no pair, no straight)	480 / 7776 (Note: Busts have much lower probability than in card poker, because there are only 6 values instead of 13, making pairs and straights much more likely than with cards. In poker dice there are in fact only four possible bust hands: [A K Q J 9], [A K Q 10 9], [A K J 10 9], and [A Q J 10 9]; both other no-pair hands (i.e., in which either the A or the 9 are missing) are straights. Consequently, in some variants of the rules, straights are counted as busts.)	6.17%	16.2	—N/a		A K Q J 9	1 6 5 4 2

The combined probability of a straight or a bust is 720/7776. As previously noted, variations of the game may rank the straight higher than a full house, and a bust higher than three of a kind.

== Variants ==
Marlboro once marketed a set of octahedral poker dice that included suits; each die had slightly different numberings, ranging from 7 up to ace. A similar set is currently manufactured by Koplow Games.

In 1974, Aurora produced a set of 12-sided poker dice called "Jimmy the Greek Odds Maker Poker Dice" and in 2000, Aurora/Rex Games produced a similar set under the name "Royal Poker Dice". The sets featured five 12-sided dice allowing for all 52 playing cards to be represented. The remaining 8 faces featured stars and acted as wild cards allowing for every possible poker hand to be rolled.

A two-player variant of the game Liar's Dice can be played with Poker dice. Players roll their own set of Poker dice behind a screen, and bid and call based on Poker dice hands.

== See also ==
- Crown and Anchor
- List of poker hands
- Yahtzee
- Liar's dice
