= Mexico (game) =

Dice game

Mexico is an elimination-style dice game, in which several players agree to play a set number of rounds. After each round, the losing player pays into a common pot of money. When all players but one have been eliminated by losing all their money, the remaining player wins the game and the pot. Owing to its extremely simple play-structure, it is generally pursued as a method of gambling, whereby the final remaining player wins the amount of money wagered by each person who was eliminated in earlier rounds. Scoring is identical to the dice game Mia (aka "Mexicali Dice" or "Mexican Liars"), but Mia has very different game mechanics, as it is a variant of the drinking game liar's dice. The game Bidou (aka "Montevideo") has a similar scoring system, but uses three dice instead.

== Equipment ==
The game requires two six-sided dice and a surface upon which to roll them. Ideally, this surface will have a barrier of some sort on at least one side, off of which to bounce the dice during rolling and to prevent spillage.

== Play ==
At the start of play, each player agrees to wager an equal amount of finite resources (generally money), and at the end of each round, the player with the lowest roll gives up a predetermined portion of that resource. Commonly, the losing player pays money into a common pot which is awarded eventually to the last player still holding money. To play without money, an equal number of tokens may be distributed to each player, with the losing player in each round required to discard one or two tokens; players are eliminated from the game when they run out of tokens.

For instance, players might start out with twenty-five dollars each, having agreed in advance that each round will cost the loser of that round five dollars. The game ends when enough rounds have been played that only one player with any money remains, at which point the pot is awarded. Thus, following the above example, three players, each betting a total of $25 with a minimum betting unit of $5 for each round could play a minimum of ten and a maximum of fourteen rounds before a winner emerges, winning $50 in addition to their initial $25 stake.

Rolling order for the first round is determined by rolling one die, with the player rolling highest going first, followed by the player to their left, and so on until a full clockwise rotation has been completed. This marks the end of the round. At this point, whoever has rolled for the lowest result puts their portion of money into the pot, and another round begins. Regardless of who rolled last, the losing player becomes first to roll the dice on the following round. During regular play (i.e., when not rolling for lead spot), two dice are always used.

Mexico scoring (ascending order)
Result	Ways
31, 32	2 Ways
41, 42, 43	2 Ways
51, 52, 53, 54	2 Ways
61, 62, 63, 64, 65	2 Ways
any double	1 Way
21 ("Mexico")	2 Ways

The lead player can roll the dice up to three times, and the number of rolls they take determines how many rolls each subsequent player may take in that round; for example, if the lead player rolls twice, each player may (but is not required to) roll twice as well. However, only the last roll of any player's turn counts as their final score for that turn, not the best result of multiple rolls. Thus, it is in the lead player's interest not to roll the dice more than necessary, as doing so will give opponents more opportunities to beat what might turn out to be a low result.

=== Scoring ===
Two dice are used, and on each roll their separate numerical values are combined into a two-digit number, assigning a tens-column value to the higher of the two dice and a ones-column value to the lower. For example, a roll of four and two would translate into a result of forty-two, a roll of four and five would be fifty-four, a roll of six and five would be sixty-five, and so on. There are two exceptions to this ranking scheme:

1. Doubles are ranked extra-numerically (six and six ranks highest, with five and five just below it, and so on down to one and one), and are worth more than any mixed roll, except for
2. The two and one roll ("Mexico"), which counts for a score of twenty-one. It is the "Mexico" roll after which the game is named, and this is the highest-ranked roll in the game, above six and six.

The highest score is twenty-one, followed by the six doubles, and the highest possible numerical value is sixty-five, which itself would rank just below one and one, and the lowest possible roll is thirty-one. This scoring system is identical to the dice game Mia, but the gameplay of Mia uses bluffing instead of straight comparisons.

Mexico scoring combinations
Die A Die B	1	2	3	4	5	6
1	Double-1	21 "Mexico"	31	41	51	61
2	21 "Mexico"	Double-2	32	42	52	62
3	31	32 Days to	Double-3	43	53	63
4	41	42	43	Double-4	54	64
5	51	52	53	54	Double-5	65
6	61	62	63	64	65	Double-6

Although there are thirty-six possible results for any roll of two dice, there are only twenty-one meaningful results in the game of Mexico, since some rolls are equivalent. For instance, while a six and five and a five and six are considered different results in a statistical sense, they both equal sixty-five in this game.

=== Doubling stakes ===
A "Mexico" roll (scoring 21) doubles the stakes for that round; the loser of that round will put two betting units into the pot rather than one. Generally speaking, the stakes do not continue to quadruple, and then octuple, in relation to the original stake, if additional "Mexico" rolls occur in a single round. However, for the sake of clarity and the smooth flow of play, this issue should always be decided before play begins.

Players trying to decide which way to go on this issue ought to keep in mind that the odds against two "Mexicos" in a row are 212 to 4 (or 53 to 1; roughly a 1.85% likelihood), and against three in a row are 1288 to 8 (or 161 to 1; roughly a 0.61% likelihood). These are long, but certainly not astronomical, odds. For the sake of context: The odds of rolling three "hardway" sixes or eights in a row in craps is 213 to 3 (roughly a 1.3% likelihood). Furthermore, these odds assume that each player is allowed only one roll; if "Mexico" is the final result of two or three rolls, the likelihood of duplicating it rises substantially, in the same way that the median roll for a given round changes, depending on how many rolls the leader takes.

=== Ties ===
Ties are only relevant if two or more players are tied for lowest place, and are therefore broken at the end of each round, since if many are playing, a tie early on may be a moot point by the time the round is over. Tie-breaking can be accomplished by having the tied parties play a "sub-round" of Mexico, with the loser of that round paying into the pot in the usual manner.

== Strategy and odds ==
Probability of exceeding x result in n rolls
Result (x)	Likelihood of exceeding x after		
Result (x)	n=1 roll	n=2 rolls	n=3 rolls
31	94.44%	99.69%	99.98%
32	88.89%	98.77%	99.86%
41	83.33%	97.22%	99.54%
42	77.78%	95.06%	98.9%
43	72.22%	92.28%	97.86%
51	66.67%	88.89%	96.3%
52	61.11%	84.88%	94.12%
53	55.56%	80.25%	91.22%
**54**	**50%**	75%	87.5%
61	44.44%	69.14%	82.85%
62	38.89%	62.65%	77.18%
63	33.33%	55.56%	70.37%
**64**	27.78%	**47.84%**	62.33%
65	22.22%	39.51%	52.95%
**Double 1**	19.44%	35.11%	**47.73%**
Double 2	16.67%	30.56%	42.13%
Double 3	13.89%	25.85%	36.15%
Double 4	11.11%	20.99%	29.77%
Double 5	8.33%	15.97%	22.97%
Double 6	5.56%	10.8%	15.76%
21 ("Mexico")	0%	0%	0%
This table provides a statistical breakdown of all possible rolls and their likelihood of being beaten (but not tied), according to the number of attempts an opponent has to roll against them. The median rolls, depending on how many rolls have been taken, are in **boldface text**.

=== Basic probability ===
There are 6^{2} = 36 potential combinations when rolling two six-sided dice, which are used to generate 21 scores in total, 15 two-digit numbers and 6 doubles. The odds of rolling any particular non-double score are 2/36, since there are two ways to make each two-digit numerical value, and the odds of rolling a particular double are 1/36. To determine the probability to exceed a given score, evaluate the number of combinations greater than that score.

For example, consider a score of 42. There are three scores below it (31, 32, 41), one score equal (42), and seventeen scores above it (43 through 65, inclusive, all six doubles, and 21). For any single roll of the dice, the probability is 6/36 to score below 42, since there are six total combinations to make 31, 32, and 41 (a one and three, and a three and one; a two and three, and a three and two; a one and four, and a four and one); 2/36 to tie it, since there are two ways to make 42 (a two and four, and a four and two); the remaining rolls, 28/36 = 77.78%, will exceed it.

To generalize, for a given score s, any single roll either exceeds or does not exceed s. Assign p as the probability that it will exceed s; the remainder, 1–p, will not exceed s. That is, out of n=100 rolls, the fraction F equal to p×100 can be expected to exceed s and the remainder (1–p)×100 can be expected not to exceed s.

The same probability p applies to subsequent roll(s), but to a limited population. For the second roll, since the fraction F_{1} of the first rolls exceeded s, consider just the remainder which did not exceed s on the first roll, namely 1–F_{1}. It can be expected that p of that remainder will exceed s on the second roll. This means the composite probability of exceeding s after two rolls is the sum of the fraction of first rolls which exceeded s and the fraction of second rolls (taken only on the remainder) which exceed s:

$$\frac{F_{2}}{n} = \frac{F_{1}}{n} + p \cdot \left ( 1-\frac{F_{1}}{n} \right ) = p + p \cdot \left ( 1-p \right )$$

This can be rearranged and simplified for the composite probability of exceeding s after two rolls:

$$\frac{F_{2}}{n}=p+p-p^2=(1-1)+2p-p^2=1-(1-p)^2$$

The remainder is the fraction of rolls which do not exceed s after two rolls:

$$1-\frac{F_{2}}{n} = 1-[1-(1-p)^2]=(1-p)^2$$

Similarly, after three rolls, the composite probability of exceeding s is the sum of the probability of exceeding s after two rolls and the fraction of exceeding s on the third roll from the remainder that did not exceed after two rolls:

$\frac{F_{3}}{n}=\frac{F_{2}}{n} + p \cdot \left [ 1-\frac{F_{2}}{n} \right ]$

$$=1-(1-p)^2 + p \cdot [(1-p)^2]=1-(1-p)^2 \cdot (1-p)$$
$$=1-(1-p)^3$$

=== Strategy ===
There is a moderate amount of strategy involved in Mexico, thanks to the fact that the first player to roll determines the conditions of play on a given round by re-rolling up to twice if they aren't satisfied with their initial result. On the other hand, if any subsequent player is satisfied with a particular roll, that player is not forced to roll as many times as the leading roller. Thus, any player can stop after the first roll if they like (or anytime before the maximum roll allotment), even if their result isn't the highest yet rolled, which follows from the fact that in this game one is only concerned to avoid rolling lowest in a given turn. Accordingly, the worst thing someone can do as lead roller is roll three times, only to end up with a mediocre result. Therefore, unless one has rolled something very easy to beat, and unless the field of opponents is extremely narrow (particularly in the case in which only one opponent remains) it is best to satisfy oneself with an average or even slightly below-average single result.

However, because of the game's open rolling structure and idiosyncratic adding system, determining what is a good roll is somewhat counterintuitive, and the most important thing to know is the median result for a given roll (i.e., the result such that it is an even proposition whether the next roll is likely to beat it). The median first roll result, in terms of the likelihood of some other result beating it, is 54—not 62, although there are ten possible results above and below the latter—one of the game's oddities. Thus, the main thing to be kept in mind on the first roll is where one stands in relation to 54. However, a good result on the first roll is entirely different from a good result on the second or third, with the median result becoming more and more difficult to attain on each reiteration: The median results for the second and third rolls are, respectively, 64 and double ones.

Naturally, if one knows the likelihood that they will beat their own last roll by rolling again, they also know the likelihood that someone following them will do the same. For example, if a player were to roll a 52 and then stop, that player would be looking at approximately a 61% probability that the next person will roll something equal to or better than that in one try. In other words, their next opponent would be a 3-to-2 favorite to beat or tie them. However, if the first player were to decide to roll again, they would then need to roll a 62 on their second turn, or a 64 on their third to maintain even this mediocre statistical position. Another result of 52 on a second roll would raise the likelihood of losing to or tying an opponent with two chances to roll to roughly 85%. This is of course a terrible position to be in, and the lead roller would almost certainly roll a third time, which would, in turn, give opponents more chances to beat him or her. If the lead roller were sufficiently hapless as to come up with yet another result of 52 on the third roll, an opponent would have approximately a 95% likelihood of beating or tying that result in three attempts, making our first roller a 19-to-1 underdog for that round - just as if that player had rolled for the lowest possible result, a 31, and then stopped after just one roll.

=== Coming up "Mexico" ===
Further complicating matters is the special status of the twenty-one—or "Mexico"—result. If the lead roller should achieve a result of twenty-one on any of that player's three permitted rolls, the dice pass immediately to the next player in line and the round proceeds as though that player were first to roll. In other words, the first roller is effectively out of danger of losing that round, and the second roller is given the option of rolling up to three times and setting the rolling limit for the remaining players. If the same thing happens again and the second roller (i.e., the new "lead" roller) succeeds in rolling "Mexico" in up to three attempts, then the third in line becomes the new "first," and so forth. If everyone except the last roller manages to roll "Mexico", then the last player is given three rolls to try to do the same; if that player fails they are required to feed the pot.

Finally, if anyone besides the leader rolls twenty-one when the leader has not already done so, the roll is not considered "Mexico", and play proceeds as usual, although the player in question has still rolled for an unbeatable (though still tieable) result.

== See also ==
- Bidou, a game using three dice and a similar scoring system, with the special combination of two, one, and one ("bidou") being the highest roll, followed by other rolls, including triples and consecutive sequences.
