= Liar's dice =

Class of dice games

Liar's dice is a class of dice games for two or more players in which deception is a significant gameplay element. In "single hand" liar's dice games, each player is given a set of dice, all players roll once, and the bids relate to the dice each player can see (their hand) plus all the concealed dice (the other players' hands). In "common hand" games, there is one set of dice which is passed from player to player. The bids relate to the dice as they are in front of the bidder after selected dice have been re-rolled. Originating during the 15th century, the game subsequently spread to Latin American and European countries. In 1993, a variant, Call My Bluff, won the Spiel des Jahres.

== Background ==
Liar's dice originated as a bluffing board game titled Dudo during the 15th century from the Inca Empire, and subsequently spread to Latin American countries. The game later spread to European countries via Spanish conquistadors. In the 1970s, numerous commercial versions of the game were released.

== Single hand ==
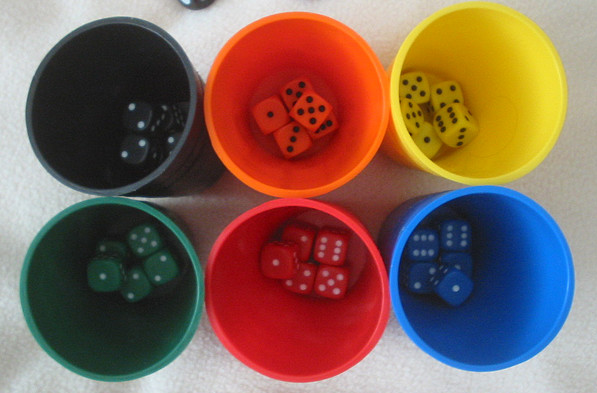
Five six-sided dice are used per player, with dice cups used for concealment.

Five dice are used per player with dice cups used for concealment.

Each round, each player rolls a "hand" of dice under their cup and looks at their hand while keeping it concealed from the other players. The first player begins bidding, announcing any face value and the minimum number of dice that the player believes are showing that value, under all of the cups in the game. Ones are often wild, always counting as the face of the current bid.

Turns rotate among the players in a clockwise order. Each player has two choices during their turn: to make a higher bid, or challenge the previous bid – typically with a call of "liar". Raising the bid means either increasing the quantity, or the face value, or both, according to the specific bidding rules used. There are many variants of allowed and disallowed bids; common bidding variants, given a previous bid of an arbitrary quantity and face value, include:

- the player may bid a higher quantity of any particular face, or the same quantity of a higher face (allowing a player to "re-assert" a face value they believe prevalent if another player increased the face value on their bid);
- the player may bid a higher quantity of the same face, or any particular quantity of a higher face (allowing a player to "reset" the quantity);
- the player may bid a higher quantity of the same face or the same quantity of a higher face (the most restrictive; a reduction in either face value or quantity is usually not allowed).

If the current player challenges the previous bid, all dice are revealed. If the bid is valid (at least as many of the face value and any wild aces are showing as were bid), the bidder wins. Otherwise, the challenger wins. The player who loses a round loses one of their dice. The last player to still retain a die (or dice) is the winner. The loser of the last round starts the bidding on the next round. If the loser of the last round was eliminated, the next player starts the new round.

=== Dice odds ===
For a given number of unknown dice n, the probability that exactly a certain quantity q of any face value are showing, P(q), is

$$\ P(q) = C(n,q) \cdot (1/6)^q \cdot (5/6)^{n-q}$$

Where C(n,q) is the number of unique subsets of q dice out of the set of n unknown dice. In other words, the number of dice with any particular face value follows the binomial distribution $B(n,\tfrac{1}{6})$.

For the same n, the probability P'(q) that at least q dice are showing a given face is the sum of P(x) for all x such that q ≤ x ≤ n, or

$$\ P'(q) = \sum_{x=q}^n C(n,x) \cdot (1/6)^x \cdot (5/6)^{n-x}$$

These equations can be used to calculate and chart the probability of exactly q and at least q for any or multiple n. For most purposes, it is sufficient to know the following facts of dice probability:

- The expected quantity of any face value among a number of unknown dice is one-sixth the total unknown dice.
- A bid of the expected quantity (or twice the expected value when playing with wilds), rounded down, has a greater than 50% chance of being correct and the highest chance of being exactly correct.

== Common hand ==
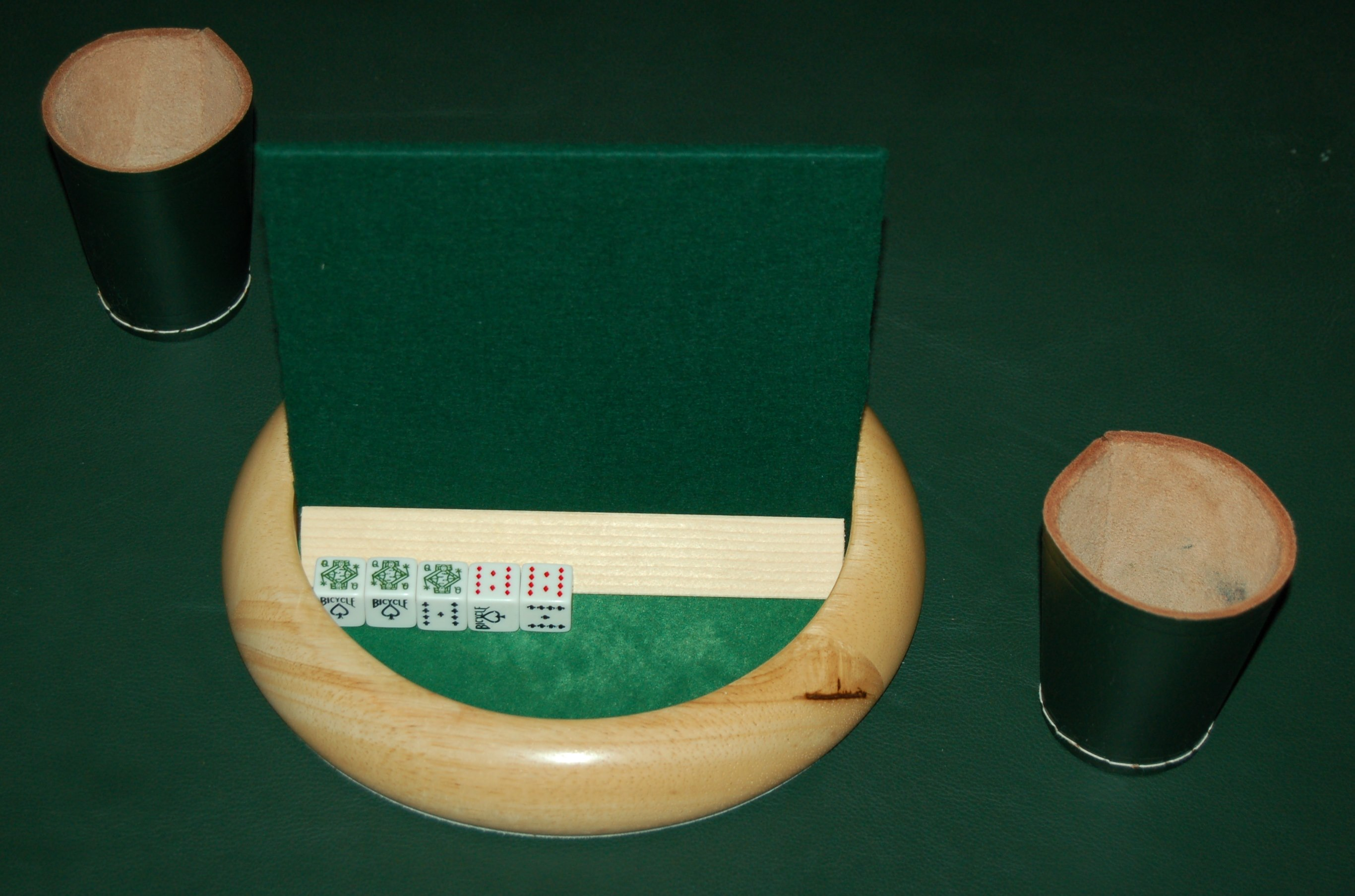
A set of poker dice being rolled behind a screen, played as in the "individual" hand version of liar's dice

The "Common hand" version is for two players. The first caller is determined at random. Both players then roll their dice at the same time, and examine their hands. Hands are called in style similar to poker, and the game may be played with poker dice:

Category	Example
Five of a kind	4
Four of a kind	2 5
High straight	2 3 4 5 6
Full house	6 1
Three of a kind	4 3 2
Low straight	1 2 3 4 5
Two pair	2 5 1
Pair	6 5 3 2
Runt	1 3 4 5 6

One player calls their hand. The other player may either call a higher-ranking hand, call the bluff, or re-roll some or all of their dice. When a bluff is called, the accused bluffer reveals their dice and the winner is determined.

== Commercial versions ==
- 1987, Milton Bradley published its own version of Liar's Dice.
- 1993 Call My Bluff, by F.X. Schmid and designer Richard Borg, was a remake of the original game then in public domain. It won the 1993 Spiel des Jahres, with the jury praising its entertainment and describing the rules as uncomplicated. Bluff also placed third on the Deutscher Spiele Preis awards.

== See also ==
- Game design
- Dudo
- Spoof (game)
- Mia (game)
- Bidou
