= Bidou =

Gambling dice game

Bidou and the closely related Montevideo are dice games which are scored according to the combination of three rolled dice; each player rolls their set of three dice simultaneously, then checks their values while keeping them concealed from other player(s) beneath a cup. Each player then wagers into a common pot, based on their roll, before revealing the dice to the other player(s); players may bluff to hint or mislead others about the strength of their concealed roll, similar to the gameplay of poker.

== History ==
The origins of Bidou are unknown; in 1934, George Gaylord Simpson wrote it appears to have been invented in the early 20th century, bearing superficial resemblances to poker, but was unknown in the United States. Jack Botermans calls it a European game, while earlier sources from the mid-20th century trace it to the coastal cities of South America (Argentina, Peru, or Punta Arenas, Chile). In a biography of John F. Kennedy, Geoffrey Perret claims that JFK learned to play bidou in 1941 while sailing to Rio de Janeiro aboard the SS Argentina with mostly South American passengers.

== Gameplay ==
=== Equipment ===
Each player receives three dice and a throwing cup to roll and conceal the dice. Chips or other tokens are used for wagering; nine chips are required for the two player game, or six per player if more than two are playing.

=== Objective ===
In the standard game, the losing player receives the pot, so the objective is to be the first player to lose all their chips. The game also can be played in the conventional manner, which is called "Montevideo". In this variation, the winning player receives the pot, and the objective is to amass as many chips as possible.

=== Captain ===
Each player rolls to determine the "captain" of the round. The captain is required to make the first bet, or pass, if they have made fewer or an equal number of throws compared to their opponent(s). Either one or all three dice may be rolled. The captain is the player with the highest roll on a single die; when more than one die is rolled, the next-highest single die may be used to break ties; for example, 6-5-3 would beat 6-4-4.

For subsequent rounds, the captain is generally the winner of the prior round, unless all players pass on betting, in which case the captain's role passes to the player on the left of the prior captain.

=== Rolling ===
Once the captaincy has been established, each player throws their dice and conceals the roll beneath the cup. If the player is not satisfied with their roll, they may re-roll; however, players are limited to three rolls in total, including the initial roll. Once the player is satisfied, or they have reached the limit of three rolls, they announce the number of throws they have made.

In one variation described by Botermans (2008), after the first round, a player may choose to keep the result from one or two of the rolled dice and re-roll the other(s) for their re-roll attempts. For example, if a player rolled a relatively low 5-2-1, they could keep the 2 and 1 and re-roll just the 5 in an attempt to gain a higher-ranked combination of 2-1-1, 2-2-1, or 4-2-1.

=== Scoring ===
Bidou special combinations (Note: Ordered from highest rank to lowest.)
Bidou		Simplified	
Roll	Odds	Roll	Odds
(Note: Highest rank overall, but beaten by 1-1-1.) "bidou"	3/216	"bidou"	3/216
"bidé"	3/216	"bidou"	3/216
4 2 1	6/216	"bidou"	3/216
6	1/216	6	1/216
5	1/216	5	1/216
4	1/216	4	1/216
3	1/216	3	1/216
2	1/216	2	1/216
(Note: Normally lowest ranking triple, but beats 2-1-1.)	1/216	1	1/216
3 6	3/216	"bidé"	3/216
3 5	3/216	"bidé"	3/216
3 4	3/216	"bidé"	3/216
3 2	3/216	"bidé"	3/216
3 1	3/216	"bidé"	3/216
1 6	3/216	"bidé"	3/216
1 5	3/216	"bidé"	3/216
1 4	3/216	"bidé"	3/216
1 3	3/216	"bidé"	3/216
3 2 1	6/216	4 5 6	6/216
4 3 2	6/216	3 4 5	6/216
5 4 3	6/216	2 3 4	6/216
6 5 4	6/216	1 2 3	6/216
Others (Note: Ranked according to sum of pips.)	varies (Note: For any pair (e.g., 5-5-n), the odds are 3/216 as this can be rolled in three different ways: e.g., 5-5-n, 5-n-5, or n-5-5. For a combination of any three unique values (e.g., 6-5-1), the odds are 6/216, as it can be rolled in six different ways: e.g., 1-5-6, 1-6-5, 5-6-1, 5-1-6, 6-1-5, and 6-5-1 are statistically different rolls, but all scored the same in Bidou.)	Others (Note: Ranked according to highest pip on a single die, then second-highest pip, etc. This means 6-6-5 is the highest non-special combination, followed by 6-6-4, 6-6-3, etc. down to 3-1-1.)	varies

The highest-ranked throw is a pair of ones with a two (2-1-1), which is called "bidou" and gives the game its name. There are 22 special combinations in Bidou, including "bidou", a pair of 2 with 1 (2-2-1, called "bidé"), a geometrical sequence using a multiplier of 1/2× from 4 (4-2-1), the six triple rolls (6-6-6, 5-5-5, etc.), (Note: Triples are ordered by pips from highest to lowest, so triple-6 is the highest triple, while triple-1 is the lowest.) remaining pairs of 3 and 1 (3-3-x (Note: For the remaining pairs of 3 (3-3-x), x is from the set [1, 2, 4, 5, 6], as 3 would result in the triple-3.) and 1-1-y), (Note: For the remaining pairs of 1 (1-1-y), y is from the set [3, 4, 5, 6], as 1 would result in the triple-1 and 2 would result in "bidou".) and consecutive sequential integers, also known as "ladders". There is one exception to the order: the triple-1 (1-1-1) beats "bidou" (2-1-1), but otherwise follows the listed order, being beaten by higher-ordered triples, bidé, and 4-2-1. The overall probability of rolling one of the 22 special combinations is 69/216 or 31.94%.

A simplified set of 12 special combinations can be used which omits the remaining pairs of 3 and 1 and the geometrical sequence. In addition, "bidé" (2-2-1) has been moved to follow the triples, and the sequential values have been re-ranked, so the high straight (4-5-6) outranks lower straights. For this simplified set, the overall probability of rolling one of the 12 special combinations is reduced to 36/216 or 16.67%.

Simpson (1934) describes a similar set of 12 special combinations, with the exception that bidé (2-2-1) outranks all triples, second only to bidou (2-1-1).

=== Betting ===
==== Two players ====
With two players, nine chips are shared between the players, placed in the center of the table. The player who has made the fewest number of rolls bets or passes first; if the players have made an equal number of rolls, the captain bets or passes first. If both players pass, the round is over.

Otherwise, after an initial bet is made by sliding one chip out of the pile towards that player (Player A), the opponent (Player B) may drop out (decline to bet), call (by betting one chip), or raise (by betting two chips). If Player B has raised, Player A may similarly drop out, call, or raise. Once the other player's bet has been called, the round is over and both players reveal their dice to determine the winner. Otherwise, the round ends if one player drops out or folds.

The potential outcomes are:

- When both players pass without betting, neither player takes any chips.
  - Alternatively, if they are playing Montevideo, the pot remains and the new round requires another ante from each player.
- If a player drops out after betting starts, that player takes one chip as a penalty.
- After a bet or raise is called, both players reveal their rolls and the losing player takes all the chips bet.
  - Alternatively, for Montevideo, the winning player(s) takes the pot, dividing as necessary if there is a tie.

If the game reaches a point where one player has eight chips (Player X), they are entitled to an "open throw". The other player (Player Y) rolls up to three times without concealing their dice. Then Player X may roll up to three times. If Player X is able to beat Player Y's roll, Player Y takes one chip from Player X and the game continues; otherwise, if Player Y beats Player X's roll, Player X takes the last chip and loses the game.

==== Three or more players ====
Instead of a common pool of nine chips, each player is given six chips. Similar to the two-player game, the player who made the fewest number of throws opens the betting; if two or more players have an equal number of throws, the player closest to the left of the captain opens the betting. Otherwise, the captain makes the first bet. The maximum bet is raised to three chips, and the maximum raise is two chips. For Montevideo, each player contributes a predetermined ante before any betting starts.

The potential outcomes are similar to the two-player game:

- Each player who passes or drops out without betting (i.e., folding during their first opportunity to bet) does not take any chips, so if all players drop out without betting, no one takes any chips.
  - If all players drop out without betting in Montevideo, the pot is carried over from the prior round and the new round requires another ante from each player.
- Players who bet during their first opportunity and then later decide to drop out receive a penalty:
  - The first player to drop out after making a bet takes back all the chips they had bet, all the chips bet by the players who have not dropped out, plus one additional chip as a penalty.
  - Remaining players must drop out or bet, either calling or raising by an amount equal to that taken by that first drop-out. If they drop out instead, they take one chip as a penalty.
- If only one player bets and the rest drop out, the betting player discards one chip.
  - If one player raises and the remaining players drop out afterward without calling, after the penalty chips are handed out, the remaining chips in the pot are given to the player who raised.
- After a bet or raise is called, the remaining players reveal their rolls and the losing player takes all the chips bet.
  - Alternatively, for Montevideo, the winning player(s) takes the pot, dividing as necessary if there is a tie.
- When a player bets their last chip:
  - That player is not required to call any subsequent raise(s) and continues to play through the end of the round, showing their combination.
  - If that player loses, they recover any chip(s) they had bet and all the chips from the other players who showed their combination at the end of the round; any chips left over from the pot are returned to the participating bettors.
  - If that player ties, they recover any chip(s) they had bet; the player(s) that tie also recover their bet, save one chip. Any chips remaining in the pot are removed from the game.

In the "poor fish" variation of the game, if all players pass, they expose their dice and the player with the highest combination takes one chip from each of their opponents as a penalty; Montevideo has a similar "poor fish" variation in which the player with the highest combination contributes an extra chip to the pot.

== See also ==
- Mexico (game) and Mia (game), dice games which use two dice and are scored with similar special combinations; 2-1 ("Mexico") is the highest roll, followed by pairs.
