= Dudo =

Dice game played in South America, also known as Perudo or ice and dice

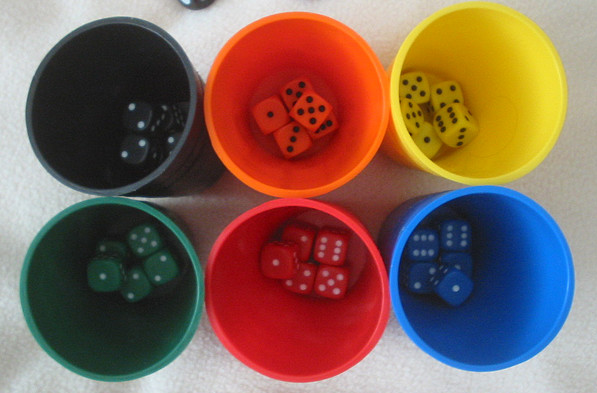
A Perudo set

Dudo (Spanish for I doubt), also known as cacho, pico, perudo, liar's dice, Peruvian liar dice, cachito, or dadinho is a popular dice game played in South America. It is a more specific version of a family of games collectively called liar's dice, which has many forms and variants. This game can be played by two or more players and consists of guessing how many dice, placed under cups, there are on the table showing a certain number. The player who loses a round loses one of their dice. The last player to still have dice is the winner.

== Game play ==
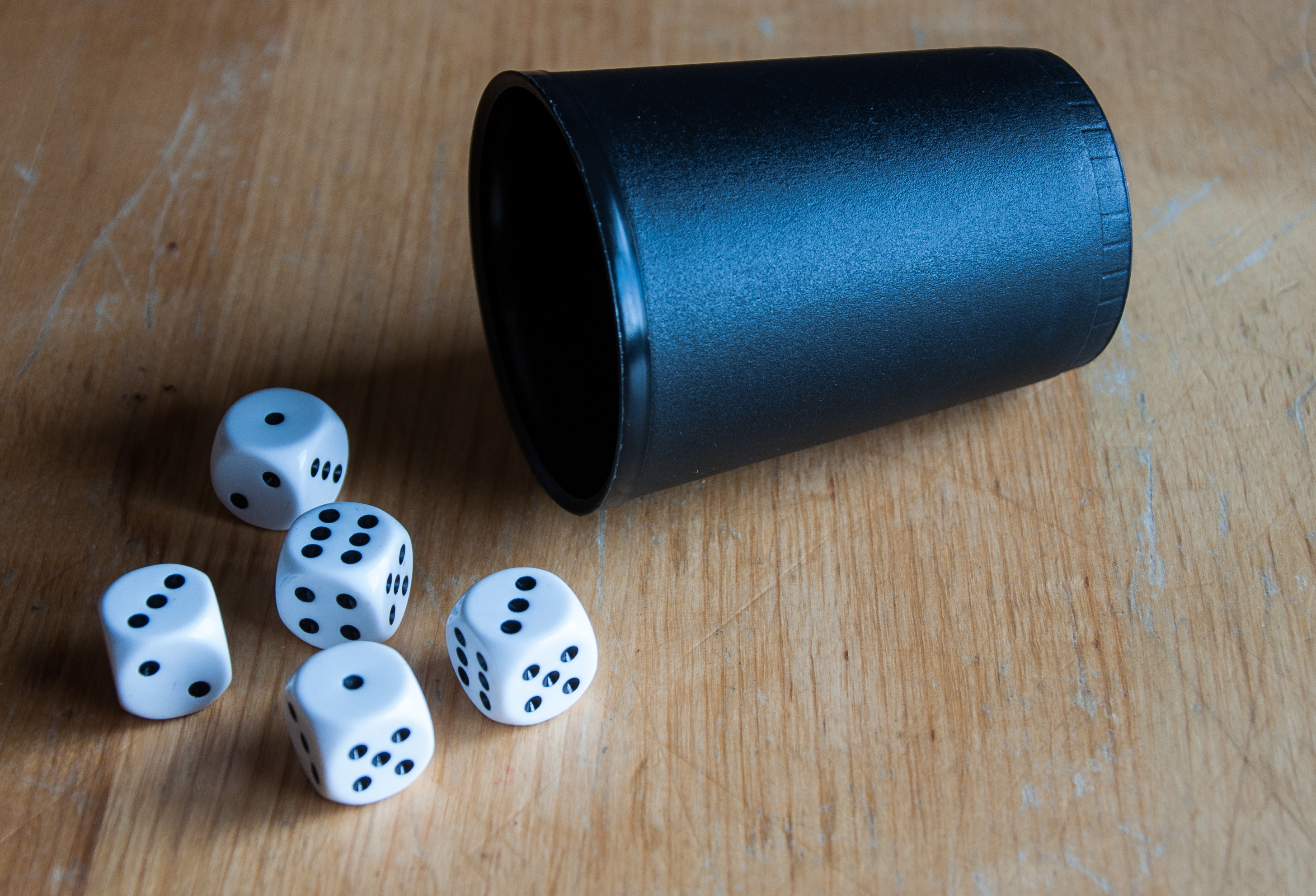
Each player has five dice and a dice cup

Each player starts having five dice and a cup, which is used for shaking the dice and concealing the dice from the other players.

To decide order of play (who starts and who goes next), players roll a single die. Highest roll goes first, then next lowest and so on. In the event of a tie between 2 players, they simply re-roll until one gains a higher score.

Each game round begins with the players shaking the dice in their cups, then slamming upside down cup on table so that shaken dice remain concealed fully inside the cup. Players carefully lift the cups to look at their own dice while keeping them concealed from other players. The first player then makes a bid about how many dice of a certain value are showing among all players, at a minimum. Aces (ones) are wild, meaning that they count as any other number. For example: a bid of "five threes" is a claim that there are at least five dice showing a three or a one, when you tally up all the dice across all players in the table. The player challenges the next player (moving clockwise) to raise the bid or call dudo to end the round.

Raise
also known as "bid" in most versions, a player can increase the quantity of dice (e.g. from "five threes" to "six threes") or the die number (e.g. "five threes" to "five sixes") or both. If a player increases the quantity, they can choose any number e.g. a bid may increase from "five threes" to "six twos".

Bidding aces
a player who wishes to bid aces can halve the quantity of dice, rounding upwards. For instance, if the current bid is "five threes" then the next player would have to bid at least three aces. If the current bid is aces, the next player can call dudo or increase the quantity (e.g. "four aces") or bid a different number, in which case the lower bound on the quantity is one more than double the previous quantity—for instance, from "three aces", a player wishing to bid fours would have to bid "seven fours" or higher. Players are not allowed to begin a round betting on aces unless they have only one die left.
Call
also known as dudo, if the player calls, it means that they do not believe the previous bid was correct. All dice are then shown and, if the guess is not correct, the previous player (the player who made the bid) loses a die. If it is correct, the player who called loses a die. A player with no dice remaining is eliminated from the game. After calling, a new round starts with the player that lost a die making the first bid, or (if that player was eliminated) the player to that player's left.
Spot on
also known as calzo (etymology: perfect shoe fit) in some versions, the player claims that the previous bidder's bid is exactly right. If the number is higher or lower, the claimant loses one or two dice, depending on the agreed upon rules. Otherwise, they recover a lost die. This is a reward for incurring on additional risk. Regardless of the outcome of the spot on, the previous bidder will not lose a die. The spot on can be played for as long as there is more than half of the original number of dice left on the table.
Burn
A player has the option to "burn" some of their dice by revealing their hand, presenting one or a chosen set of dice of the same suit, putting the rest of the dice back in the cup, and re-rolling them. The revealed dice remain in play, and the entire table can see them. This is useful for when a player feels like they have a bad hand. It cannot be done when the player has only one die.

Different versions of the game divide the lifeline of a player differently. In some versions, when a player first reaches one die (i.e. loses a round and goes from two dice to one), the player obliga (meaning "they coerce") the round. In this kind of special round—often known as palo fijo—aces don't count as wildcards, and the suit can only be changed by players with a single die. The player gets to choose if they play the round open or closed. In an open round, everyone can see everybody's dice but their own. However, in a closed round, only the players with one die remaining can see their dice. In some other versions, the palo fijo happens on a player reaching their last two dice, and involves nobody being able to change the suit, as well as aces not counting as wildcards for the round. Then, upon a player reaching their last die, what begins is a palo ciego—nobody is allowed to see their hand, except for players that only have one die in theirs, and the bids must be done blindly. Often, players do not slam their cups before the round is called, to add tension.

The game ends when only one player has dice remaining; that player is the winner.
