= Liar's Dice (Milton Bradley) =

Liar's Dice is a board game published in 1987 by Milton Bradley.

== Contents ==
Liar's Dice is a game in which each player shakes five dice inside a shaker, and the first player makes a bid on the hidden results, and the other players in order must raise the bid or challenge.

== Reception ==
The Chicago Tribune called the game "A nice combination of strategy and luck; good for the whole family."

Brian Walker reviewed Liar's Dice for Games International magazine, and gave it 5 stars out of 5, and stated that "Role-players, wargamers (even), and people who normally hate games can play, enjoy, and win this game. Liar's Dice, entry in the hall of fame is yours, no die roll required."

== Reviews ==
- Games #93
- Best Games of 1988 in Games #94
- Family Games: The 100 Best
