= Mia (game) =

Dice game

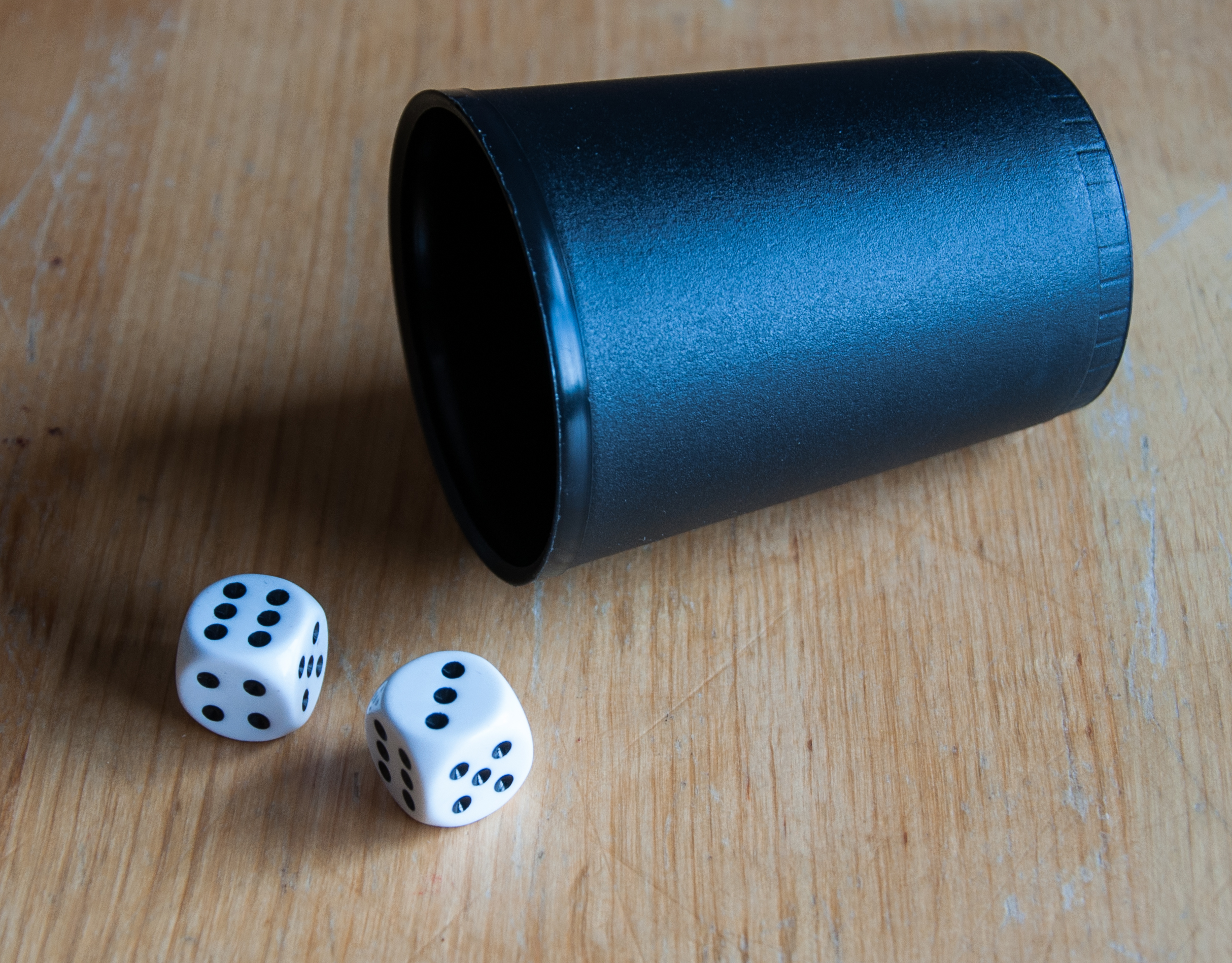
Mia is played with two dice and a dice cup

Mia is a simple dice game with a strong emphasis on bluffing and detecting bluff related to Liar's dice.

== Equipment ==
Two dice and either a flat bottomed container with a lid or a dice cup are needed. This game is played by three or more players.

== Play ==
All players start with six lives. Usually each player use a separate die to keep track of their lives, counting down from 6 to 1 as they lose lives. The players roll a single die to determine who goes first.

To start a round, the first player (Player A) rolls the dice and checks their throw while keeping the value concealed from the other players in or under the container. That player must end their turn by announcing a value according to one of three choices:

1. Lie and announce a greater value than what was rolled.
2. Tell the truth and announce the actual value of what has been rolled.
3. Lie and announce a lesser value than what was rolled.

There is no required minimum value for the announcement following the first roll of the round. The action then passes to the next player (Player B), usually in a clockwise fashion (i.e., the player to the left), who now must choose one of two options:

1. Player B believes the passer and roll the dice without checking the as-received value. After rolling, Player B may choose to check the newly rolled value or not, but also must end their turn by announcing a value. In this case, Player B must announce a value equal to or higher than the value announced previously by Player A. For a poor liar it may be sensible to not look at the dice.
2. Call Player A a liar and open the cup to expose the dice.
  - If the dice show a lesser value than what was announced, confirming that Player A lied about the value, Player A loses a life and Player B starts a new round.
  - However, if the dice show a value greater than or equal to the value announced by Player A, the challenging player (Player B) loses a life and the next player (Player C) starts a new round.
3. Some variants provide a third option, allowing Player B to pass the action to the next player (Player C) without rolling or looking at the dice, again requiring Player B to ending their turn by announcing the same or a higher value than what Player A announced. This relieves Player A of all responsibility. This choice rests on the assumption that the Player A announced a lesser value than they rolled, which may be a sensible choice if they want to get at a player further down the line.

This process continues with the next player until the round ends. Note that each player must always announce a value greater than the previous value announced, unless they are passed a Mia in which case the round ends with the next player. When Mia is announced, the next player has two choices:

1. They may give up without looking at the dice and lose one life.
2. They may look at the dice. If it was a Mia (21), they lose two lives. If it wasn't, the previous player loses one life as usual.

The first player to lose all of their lives loses the game.

=== Example ===
Suppose there are four players A, B, C, and D:

- Player A rolls and announces 52, which is fairly easy to beat.
- Without looking, player B shakes the box. When they look inside, they see 43 so they are forced to bluff by announcing 65 and passing on to player C.
- Player C isn't sure about the call but 65 is hard to beat so they pass to player D, also announcing 65.
- For the same reasons, player D announces 65 and passes to player A.
- Player A also does not think they can beat 65 and player B looks pretty confident so player A announces 65 and passes it to B, meaning that player B must beat the score they originally announced (65).
- Since player B is the only person who actually knows what is in the box, they challenge player A, and player A loses a life, since the actual value (43) is less than the last value announced (65).

== Scoring ==
Mia scoring (ranked highest to lowest)
Standard			Alternate		
Roll		To beat	Roll		To beat
21 "Mia"	Dice value 2 Dice value 1	0%	21 "Mia"	Dice value 2 Dice value 1	0%
66 double-6	Dice value 6	5.6%	31 "Little Mia"	Dice value 3 Dice value 1	5.6%
55 double-5	Dice value 5	8.3%	66 double-6	Dice value 6	11.1%
44 double-4	Dice value 4	11.1%	55 double-5	Dice value 5	13.9%
33 double-3	Dice value 3	13.9%	44 double-4	Dice value 4	16.7%
22 double-2	Dice value 2	16.7%	33 double-3	Dice value 3	19.4%
11 double-1	Dice value 1	19.4%	22 double-2	Dice value 2	22.2%
65	Dice value 6 Dice value 5	22.2%	11 double-1	Dice value 1	25%
64	Dice value 6 Dice value 4	27.8%	65	Dice value 6 Dice value 5	27.8%
63	Dice value 6 Dice value 3	33.3%	64	Dice value 6 Dice value 4	33.3%
62	Dice value 6 Dice value 2	38.9%	63	Dice value 6 Dice value 3	38.9%
61	Dice value 6 Dice value 1	44.4%	62	Dice value 6 Dice value 2	44.4%
54	Dice value 5 Dice value 4	50%	61	Dice value 6 Dice value 1	50%
53	Dice value 5 Dice value 3	55.6%	54	Dice value 5 Dice value 4	55.6%
52	Dice value 5 Dice value 2	61.1%	53	Dice value 5 Dice value 3	61.1%
51	Dice value 5 Dice value 1	66.7%	52	Dice value 5 Dice value 2	66.7%
43	Dice value 4 Dice value 3	72.2%	51	Dice value 5 Dice value 1	72.2%
42	Dice value 4 Dice value 2	77.8%	43	Dice value 4 Dice value 3	77.8%
41	Dice value 4 Dice value 1	83.3%	42	Dice value 4 Dice value 2	83.3%
32	Dice value 3 Dice value 2	88.9%	41	Dice value 4 Dice value 1	88.9%
31	Dice value 3 Dice value 1	94.4%	32 "Joker"	Dice value 3 Dice value 2	94.4%

Unlike most dice games, the value of the roll is not the sum of the dice. Instead, the highest die is multiplied by ten and then added to the other die. The roll one and two is 21, and the roll five and six is 65. The highest roll is 21 which is called Mia, followed by the doubles from 66 to 11, and then all other rolls from 65 down to 31. Thus, the complete order of rolls (from highest to lowest) is 21 (Mia), 66, 55, 44, 33, 22, 11, 65, 64, 63, 62, 61, 54, 53, 52, 51, 43, 42, 41, 32, 31.

== Strategy ==
The appeal of Mia resides primarily in the potential it affords for bluffing. As with other games of bluff, this is partly a psychological challenge. It is important to know the other players and master the subtleties of more or less conscious interpersonal communication. A common strategy is to develop a "character". A player may, for instance pretend to be a truthful person, a notorious liar, a constantly lucky roller, or one that usually tries to get at players beyond the next player. This will make the actions of the other players more predictable, which will give the player an advantage.

It is, however, also about statistics. In total, there are 36 possible throw combinations with two dice; however, there are only 21 possible results in this game. There are two ways to achieve any result with two different numbers; for example, a result of 43 can be achieved by rolling either three and four, or rolling a four and three; on the other hand, doubles can only be made in one way.

As an example, consider the roll 55. There are two rolls ranked above this (21 and 66), and so the probability that any single subsequent roll would beat 55 is the sum of the probability of rolling 21, which is 2/36, or rolling 66, which is 1/36. Therefore the probability of beating 55 outright on a subsequent roll is 3/36 or 8.3%. To compute the probability of losing to 55, the possibility of a tie must be included, that is, adding the probability of rolling 55, which is again 1/36. The total probability of beating or tying 55 on a subsequent roll is 4/36 or 11.1%, and consequently the probability of losing to 55 (i.e., neither beating nor tying) on a subsequent roll is 1–4/36 or 88.9%.

Because of the disparity in probabilities to roll doubles compared to mixed numbers, the median roll in this game is 54, which means that on average, any single roll has an equal chance of being above or below a roll of 54. Players should be aware that 54 is the "middle" roll, in the sense that if a player announces 54, there is a 50% chance that the next player will roll a better value. In the Danish version called Meyer, the equivalent middle roll is 61, as the "little Meyer" (31) roll is ranked above the doubles.

Note that 62 is positioned in the middle of the possible results table, with ten possible results above and below 62. In comparison, there are twelve possible results above and eight below 54. The likelihood that someone rolling a 62 (the numeric median result) will be beaten by a subsequent roller is only about 39 percent, while someone rolling a 54 (the statistical, or actual, median result) is facing exactly even odds.

== Variations ==
The game is also known as Kuriki, Kariki, Kinito, Meyer, Meier, or Mire. Because the gameplay has been passed down orally, many variations and house rules exist.

Ian MacKaye named his band Coriky after the game, which the band states is popular among Washington, DC-area punk bands on tour. Steve Albini wrote that his band, Shellac, learned it from Fugazi, who in turn learned it from Citizen Fish.

=== Scoring variations ===
- 31 may be considered the 2nd best roll (called "little Mia") instead of the worst, and 32 (called "joker") may also be assigned special functions.
- The order of the rolls 66 to 11 may be reversed.
- The rolls from 31 to 65 might be represented by just stating the sum of the two dice, so that e.g. both 62 and 53 are called "8 pips" and have the same value, better than "7 pips" (including 61) but worse than "9 pips" (including 54). In this case, the probability to beat the 11-pip and 10-pip scores are the same as 65 and 64, respectively, as they have 2 ways to form each since the double-5 is scored separately and not counted, followed by 9-pip (4 ways to form, 33.3% to beat), 8-pip (4 ways to form as double-4 is not counted, 44.4% to beat), 7-pip (6 ways to form, 55.6% to beat), 6-pip (4 ways to form as double-3 is not counted, 72.2% to beat), 5-pip (4 ways to form, 83.3% to beat), and 4-pip (2 ways to form as double-2 is not counted, 94.4% to beat, same as 31).

=== Gameplay variations ===
- The penalty whenever Mia is involved may be doubled so that one loses two lives instead of one.
- The requirement that one must announce more than the previous player can be relaxed so that one just has to announce at least the same, but then, the option of passing on the dice without looking would be banned.
- It can also be played that the dice roll must be beaten, ensuring drama for a Mia.
- A drinking game variation may be played, whereby instead of a life, a finger/swig may be imbibed instead. Typically Mia is accompanied by a 'stiff' penalty also, for example, a whole drink.
